= List of flag bearers for Afghanistan at the Olympics =

Afghanistan at the Olympics
- IOC code: AFG
- NOC: Afghanistan National Olympic Committee
- Website: www.olympic.af
- Medals: Gold 0 Silver 0 Bronze 2 Total 2

Summer appearances
- 1936; 1948; 1952; 1956; 1960; 1964; 1968; 1972; 1976; 1980; 1984; 1988; 1992; 1996; 2000; 2004; 2008; 2012; 2016; 2020; 2024

This is a list of flag bearers who have represented Afghanistan at the Olympics.

Flag bearers carry the national flag of their country at the opening ceremony of the Olympic Games.

| # | Event year | Season | Flag bearer | Sport | Ref. |
|---|---|---|---|---|---|
| 1 | 1972 | Summer | Ghulam Dastagir | Wrestling | |
| 2 | 1988 | Summer | Mohammad Razigul | Wrestling | |
| 3 | 1996 | Summer | Muhamed Aman | Boxing | |
| 4 | 2004 | Summer | Nina Suratger | Official | |
| 5 | 2008 | Summer | Nesar Ahmad Bahave | Taekwondo | |
| 6 | 2012 | Summer | Nesar Ahmad Bahave | Taekwondo | |
| 7 | 2016 | Summer | Mohammad Tawfiq Bakhshi | Judo | |
| 8 | 2020 | Summer | Farzad Mansouri | Taekwondo | |
| 8 | 2020 | Summer | Kamia Yousufi | Athletics | |
| 9 | 2024 | Summer | Fariba Hashimi | Cycling | |
| 9 | 2024 | Summer | Sha Mahmood Noor Zahi | Athletics | |

== See also ==
- Afghanistan at the Olympics
