= Afghanistan at the Olympics =

- Flag of the Islamic Republic of Afghanistan
- IOC code: AFG
- NOC: National Olympic Committee of the Islamic Republic of Afghanistan
- Medals Ranked 147th: Gold 0 Silver 0 Bronze 2 Total 2

Summer appearances
- 1936; 1948; 1952; 1956; 1960; 1964; 1968; 1972; 1976; 1980; 1984; 1988; 1992; 1996; 2000; 2004; 2008; 2012; 2016; 2020; 2024; 2028

Afghanistan has competed in 16 Summer Olympic Games since its debut in 1936. The nation has never appeared in the Winter Olympic Games. It has sent a delegation to 14 of the 19 subsequent Summer Games since then. It is organised by the National Olympic Committee of the Islamic Republic of Afghanistan. The Committee is currently in exile and presided by Hafizullah Wali Rahimi: the International Olympic Committee does not recognise the Taliban regime's Committee, headed by Ahmadullah Wasiq nor do they allow the Islamic Emirate of Afghanistan to be represented at the Olympics.

== History ==
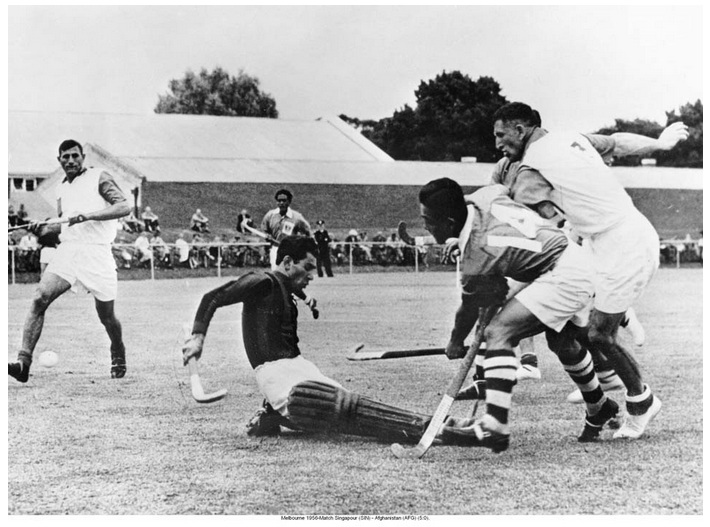
Afghanistan's field hockey team in 1956

The country made its first appearance at the Berlin Games in 1936. Afghanistan competed at the 1948 Summer Olympics in London, sending a total of 31 competitors, which consisted of the men's field hockey and football teams. This is the highest number of athletes that Afghanistan has ever sent to a Summer Olympic Games.

Afghanistan's football tournament culminated in Afghanistan being defeated 6-0 against Luxembourg, and they failed to qualify to the first round of the tournament. At the men's field hockey tournament won one match, drew one match and lost one match, resulting in placing third of four competing teams, with 3 points. Therefore, Afghanistan did not proceed to the semi-finals, finishing third in their respective group.

In the following 1952 Games at Helsinki, Afghanistan did not participate. However, Afghanistan returned for the 1956 Games at Melbourne, sending a team of 12 for the men's field hockey tournament, with six of the competitors on the team having participated previously in 1948.

Afghanistan did not send a team, sending an official to the Barcelona Games in 1992, and sent only two representatives to the Atlanta Games in 1996: light-middleweight boxer Mohammad Jawid Aman was disqualified after he arrived too late for the mandatory weigh-in and draw, which left marathon runner Abdul Baser Wasiqi as the country's sole representative. Wasiqi pulled a hamstring before the race, but competed nonetheless, limping his way through the marathon and finishing last.

The ANOC was suspended by the IOC in 1999, and Afghanistan were subsequently banned from the Sydney Games in 2000 for discrimination against women under the rule of the Taliban and prohibition of sports of any kind. The country was re-instated in 2002 following the fall of the Taliban, and sent five representatives to the Athens Games in 2004.

Among them were two women, Robina Muqim Yaar and Friba Razayee, the first ever women to compete for Afghanistan at the Olympics.

Afghanistan sent a team of four competitors, including three men and one woman, Mehboba Ahdyar, to the 2008 Beijing Games. Ahdyar received death threats due to her intended participation in the Games.

Afghanistan won their first summer Olympic medal during the 2008 Beijing Games, with Rohullah Nikpai winning a bronze in men's Taekwondo 58 kg, and their second at the 2012 Games with another bronze for Nikpai in the men's 68kg taekwondo event.

Afghanistan returned for a fourth consecutive games, at Rio de Janeiro in 2016. Rohullah Nikpai, who had earned a medal at the two previous games in taekwando did not return. Instead, three athletes were sent, competing in two sports - Athletics and Judo. None of the athletes managed to progress and qualify further in their events. Despite finishing last in the women's 100 metres, Kamia Yousufi became Afghanistan's national record holder with 14.02 seconds, which was also at her Olympic debut. She also ran her preliminary heat in a full-body kit and hijab.

In April 2021, the ANOC announced that Fahim Anwari will become the first swimmer to represent Afghanistan at the Olympics. Afghanistan received an invitation from the Tripartite Commission to send a men's rifle shooter, Mahdi Yovari, marking the nation's Olympic debut in the sport.

Afghanistan's participation status for the 2024 Summer Olympics was unclear amid the political turmoil and the Taliban's return to power in August 2021. In June 2024, it was confirmed that Afghanistan would be participating with 3 male and 3 female athletes. However, the Taliban stated that they would not recognise the three participating females (all of whom currently live in exile), and the IOC did not admit any Taliban officials. All six athletes competed under the flag and anthem of the Islamic Republic of Afghanistan as the Islamic Emirate of Afghanistan is not recognised by the IOC.

== Medal tables ==
=== Medals by Summer Games ===
Games	Athletes	Gold	Silver	Bronze	Total	Rank
(Germany) 1936 Berlin	19	0	0	0	0	–
(United Kingdom) 1948 London	31	0	0	0	0	–
(Finland) 1952 Helsinki	did not participate					
(Australia) 1956 Melbourne	12	0	0	0	0	–
(Italy) 1960 Rome	18	0	0	0	0	–
(Japan) 1964 Tokyo	8	0	0	0	0	–
1968 Mexico City	5	0	0	0	0	–
(West Germany) 1972 Munich	8	0	0	0	0	–
(Canada) 1976 Montreal	did not participate					
(Soviet Union) 1980 Moscow	11	0	0	0	0	–
(United States) 1984 Los Angeles	boycotted					
(South Korea) 1988 Seoul	5	0	0	0	0	–
(Spain) 1992 Barcelona	did not participate					
(United States) 1996 Atlanta	2	0	0	0	0	–
(Australia) 2000 Sydney	banned from participating					
(Greece) 2004 Athens	5	0	0	0	0	–
(China) 2008 Beijing	4	0	0	1	1	82
(United Kingdom) 2012 London	6	0	0	1	1	79
(Brazil) 2016 Rio de Janeiro	3	0	0	0	0	–
(Japan) 2020 Tokyo	5	0	0	0	0	–
(France) 2024 Paris	6	0	0	0	0	–
(United States) 2028 Los Angeles	future event					
(Australia) 2032 Brisbane	future event					
Total		0	0	2	2	148

=== Medals by summer sport ===
Sport	Gold	Silver	Bronze	Total
Taekwondo	0	0	2	2
Totals (1 entries)	0	0	2	2

Note: Afghanistan was banned from the Olympics in 2000 for the Taliban regime's discrimination against women at the time.

== List of medalists ==
Medal	Name	Games	Sport	Event
(bronze) Bronze	Rohullah Nikpai	(China) 2008 Beijing	Taekwondo	Men's 58 kg
(bronze) Bronze	Rohullah Nikpai	(United Kingdom) 2012 London	Taekwondo	Men's 68 kg

== See also ==
- List of flag bearers for Afghanistan at the Olympics
- List of participating nations at the Summer Olympic Games
- Category:Olympic competitors for Afghanistan
- Afghanistan at the Paralympics
- Afghanistan at the Asian Games
- Sport in Afghanistan
