= Afghanistan at the World Athletics Championships =

- Flag of Afghanistan
- WA code: AFG
- National federation: Afghanistan Athletics Federation
- Medals: Gold 0 Silver 0 Bronze 0 Total 0

World Athletics Championships appearances (overview)
- 1983; 1987–2001; 2003; 2005; 2007; 2009; 2011; 2013; 2015; 2017; 2019; 2022; 2023; 2025

Afghanistan has competed at the World Athletics Championships on eleven occasions, and did not send a delegation from 1987 to 2001. Its competing country code is AFG. The country has not won any medals at the competition and as of 2025 no Afghan athlete has progressed beyond the first round of an event.

== Results ==
Key

- Q = Qualified for the next round
- q = Qualified for the next round as a fastest loser or, in field events, by position without achieving the qualifying target
- NR = National record
- PB = Personal best
- SB = Season best
- N/A = Round not applicable for the event

=== 1983 ===
Afghanistan sent one athlete to compete at the 1983 World Championships in Athletics in Helsinki, Finland, from August 7 to 14, 1983.

==== Men ====
Athlete	Event	Heat	
Athlete	Event	Result	Rank
Mohamad Ismail Bakaki	100 metres	12.33	65 (Did not advance)

=== 2007 ===
Afghanistan sent two athletes to compete at the 2007 World Athletics Championships in Osaka, Japan, from 25 August to 2 September 2007.

==== Men ====
Track and road events

Athlete	Event	Heat		Quarter-final		Semifinal		Final		Final Rank
Athlete	Event	Result	Rank	Result	Rank	Result	Rank	Result	Rank	Final Rank
Waleed Anwari	100 metres	11.75 SB	8	Did not advance						62

==== Women ====
Track and road events

Athlete	Event	Heat		Quarter-final		Semifinal		Final		Final Rank
Athlete	Event	Result	Rank	Result	Rank	Result	Rank	Result	Rank	Final Rank
Fatima Mohammadi	100 metres	16.17 PB	8	Did not advance						69

=== 2009 ===
Afghanistan fielded two competitors at the 2009 World Athletics Championships in Berlin.

==== Men ====
Event	Athletes	Heats		Quarterfinals		Semifinal		Final	
Event	Athletes	Result	Rank	Result	Rank	Result	Rank	Result	Rank
100 m	Massoud Azizi	11.79 SB	88	did not advance					

==== Women ====
Event	Athletes	Heats		Quarterfinals		Semifinal		Final	
Event	Athletes	Result	Rank	Result	Rank	Result	Rank	Result	Rank
100 m	Robina Muqimyar	14.24 SB	60	did not advance					

=== 2011 ===
Afghanistan entered one athlete at the 2011 World Championships in Athletics from August 27 to September 4 in Daegu, South Korea.

==== Men ====
Athlete	Event	Preliminaries		Heats		Semifinals		Final	
Athlete	Event	Time Width Height	Rank	Time Width Height	Rank	Time Width Height	Rank	Time Width Height	Rank
Masoud Azizi	100 metres	11.64 (SB)	26	Did not advance					

=== 2013 ===
Afghanistan competed at the 2013 World Championships in Athletics from August 10 to August 18 in Moscow, Russia. A team of one athlete was announced to represent the country in the event.

==== Men ====
Athlete	Event	Preliminaries		Heats		Semifinals		Final	
Athlete	Event	Time	Rank	Time	Rank	Time	Rank	Time	Rank
Masoud Azizi	100 metres	11.78	27	did not advance					

=== 2015 ===
Afghanistan fielded one athlete in competition at the 2015 World Championships in Athletics in Beijing, China, from 22 to 30 August 2015.

==== Men ====
Track and road events

Athlete	Event	Heat		Semifinal		Final	
Athlete	Event	Result	Rank	Result	Rank	Result	Rank
Wais Ibrahim Khairandesh	800 metres	1:59.51	8	Did not advance			

=== 2017 ===
Afghanistan competed at the 2017 World Championships in Athletics in London, United Kingdom, between 4 and 13 August 2017, with sole athlete Said Gilani competing in the men's track and road events.

=== Men ===
Track and road events

Athlete	Event	Preliminary Round		Heat		Semifinal		Final	
Athlete	Event	Result	Rank	Result	Rank	Result	Rank	Result	Rank
Said Gilani	100 metres	11.13 PB	20	Did not advance					

=== 2019 ===
Afghanistan competed at the 2019 World Athletics Championships in Doha, Qatar, from 27 September to 6 October 2019. Said Gilani was the only athlete representing Afghanistan for the second consecutive championships, in the men's 100 metres event.

==== Men ====
Track and road events

Athlete	Event	Preliminary Round		Heat		Semifinal		Final	
Athlete	Event	Result	Rank	Result	Rank	Result	Rank	Result	Rank
Said Gilani	100 metres	11.45 SB	21	Did not advance					

=== 2022 ===
Afghanistan competed at the 2022 World Athletics Championships in Eugene, United States, from 15 to 24 July 2022. Said Gilani was the only athlete representing Afghanistan for the third consecutive championships, in the men's 100 metres event.

==== Men ====
Track and road events

Athlete	Event	Preliminary		Heat		Semi-final		Final	
Athlete	Event	Result	Rank	Result	Rank	Result	Rank	Result	Rank
Said Gilani	Men's 100 metres	11.43 (+1.1) SB	17	Did not advance					

=== 2023 ===
Afghanistan competed at the 2023 World Athletics Championships in Budapest, Hungary, from 19 to 27 August 2023, entering one athlete.

==== Men ====
Track and road events

Athlete	Event	Preliminary		Heat		Semifinal		Final	
Athlete	Event	Result	Rank	Result	Rank	Result	Rank	Result	Rank
Said Gilani	100 metres	DNF		Did not advance					

=== 2025 ===
Afghanistan attended the 2025 World Athletics Championships in Tokyo, Japan, from 13 to 21 September 2025, entering 1 male athlete who ultimately did not compete.

==== Men ====
Track and road events

Athlete	Event	Heat		Final	
Athlete	Event	Result	Rank	Result	Rank
Ilhamudin Sarajzoy	5000 metres	Did not start			
