= Afghanistan at the 2004 Summer Olympics =

- IOC code: AFG
- NOC: Afghanistan National Olympic Committee

in Athens, Greece 13–29 August
- Competitors: 5 in 4 sports
- Flag bearers: Neema Suratgar (opening); Kosia Akashi (closing)
- Medals: Gold 0 Silver 0 Bronze 0 Total 0

Summer Olympics appearances (overview)
- 1936; 1948; 1952; 1956; 1960; 1964; 1968; 1972; 1976; 1980; 1984; 1988; 1992; 1996; 2000; 2004; 2008; 2012; 2016; 2020; 2024; 2028

Afghanistan sent a delegation to compete at the 2004 Summer Olympics in Athens, Greece, which were held from 13 to 29 August 2004. This was the eleventh appearance of the nation in the Summer Olympics and their first since their reinstatement to the International Olympic Committee in 2003 following a four-year ban due to the Taliban government's discrimination against women and their opposition to them playing sports. The delegation consisted of five athletes: sprinters Masoud Azizi and Robina Muqimyar, boxer Basharmal Sultani, judoka Friba Rezayee and wrestler Bashir Ahmad Rahmati. Muqimayar and Rezayee's inclusion in the Afghan delegation marked the first time the country sent a woman athlete to a Summer Olympics. All five failed to progress any further than the preliminary round of their respective sports and Afghanistan's best performance at the Games was by Muqimayar who set a new national women's 100 metre record in her heat.

== Background ==
Afghanistan first sent a delegation to compete in the Summer Olympics in 1936 Berlin Games. They have competed in every Summer Olympics since, missing the Olympics only in five occasions between 1936 and 2004. These were in 1952, 1976, 1984, 1992 and 2000. Afghanistan was suspended by the International Olympic Committee (IOC) in October 1999 and subsequently banned from the 2000 Sydney Olympics due to its discrimination against women under the rule of the Taliban and its prohibition of women's sports. Following the fall of the Taliban in 2001, the IOC helped local authorities to establish a new National Olympic Committee. These efforts led to the IOC re-instating the country in its 115th meeting in the Czech capital of Prague on 29 June 2003 and told them a prerequisite for future Olympic participation was the inclusion of women in their delegation.

The 2004 Athens Summer Games that took place from 13 to 29 August 2004 was Afghanistan's eleventh appearance at an Olympic Games. The nation sent five athletes to the Olympics: sprinters Masoud Azizi and Robina Muqimyar, boxer Basharmal Sultani, judoka Friba Rezayee and wrestler Bashir Ahmad Rahmati. Muqimayar and Rezayee's inclusion in the team was the first time Afghanistan sent women athletes to a Summer Olympics. All five athletes trained in Afghanistan and later with Iranian coaches in Tehran before travelling to Thessalonki in the run up to the Games. The team was on a limited budget due to a shortage of capital from the Afghan authorities and the general consensus in the media was they would not medal at the Games. Neema Surgatar, a coach for the Afghanistan team, was the flag bearer for the opening ceremony, while another coach, Kosia Akashi, carried it at the closing ceremony.

== Athletics ==
Competing at his first Olympic Games at the age of 18, Masoud Azizi was the only male athlete to compete for Afghanistan in athletics competition. He qualified for the Athens Games after being granted a wild card place because his best time of 11.16 seconds set during practice in the men's 100 metres was 0.88 seconds slower than the event's "B" Olympic qualifying standard. In an interview before the Games, Azizi said, "I am very proud to be with the other world champions. I will introduce myself to them.", and, "I try my best to give something back home. Everybody wants to get a medal, but even if they don't get it, it's not a matter of win or lose. The main thing is to participate.'' He was drawn to compete in heat four alongside eight other sprinters on 21 August. Azizi finished eighth and last of all the finishing runners with a time of 11.66 seconds; only the top three from each heat and the next ten fastest overall among all ten heats were able to advance, and he was eliminated from the competition. Azizi would go on to represent Afghanistan twice more at the 2008 and 2012 Summer Olympics.

18-year old Robina Muqimyar was the sole female athletics competitor to represent Afghanistan at the 2004 Summer Olympics. She qualified for the Olympics after the IOC gave her a wild card place as her best time of 13.76 seconds was 1.74 seconds slower than the "B" Olympic qualifying standard for the women's 100 metres. Her family consented to her competing in Athens. Judoka Stig Traavik scouted Muqimyar who began training on a deteriorating track at Ghazi Stadium twice a week, sometimes barefooted but always away from men for fear of harassment and assault. Before the Games, she told the BBC World Service of her desire to be a role model for Afghan women. On 20 August 2004, Muqimyar took part in the seventh heat, finishing seventh out of eight runners, with a national record time of 14.14 seconds. She was eliminated from competition as only the top three from each heat and the next ten fastest overall among all ten heats progressed to the next round. Afterwards, Muqimayr stated, "I felt a little scared because all the world was watching me. But during the warm-ups the other athletes told me they understood the difficulties I have faced to get here and they encouraged me. In the stadium, I heard a lot of cheering "Robina! Robina!" and that made me feel good." She represented Afghanistan again at the 2008 Beijing Games.

Men

Athlete	Event	Heat		Quarterfinal		Semifinal		Final	
Athlete	Event	Result	Rank	Result	Rank	Result	Rank	Result	Rank
Massoud Azizi	100 m	11.66	8	Did not advance					

Women

Athlete	Event	Heat		Quarterfinal		Semifinal		Final	
Athlete	Event	Result	Rank	Result	Rank	Result	Rank	Result	Rank
Robina Muqimyar	100 m	14.14 NR	7	Did not advance					

== Boxing ==
Basharmal Sultani was 19 years old at the time of the Athens Summer Games and was making his only appearance at an Olympic Games. He received a wild card invitation to participate in the Games from the IOC after failing to attain an automatic qualifying spot with his third-place finish in the Asian qualifying rounds for the welterweight category. Sultani was drawn to face Mohamed Hikal of Egypt in the Round of 32 on 15 August at the Peristeri Olympic Boxing Hall. He lost the match 12–40 on points and therefore that was the end of his competition. Although he was defeated, Sultani was applauded by the small crowd of spectators and said of his participation in the Olympic Games to The Atlanta Journal-Constitution, "This was a great moment in my life, and it will be the same for other athletes when they compete."

Athlete	Event	Round of 32	Round of 16	Quarterfinals	Semifinals	Final	
Athlete	Event	Opposition Result	Opposition Result	Opposition Result	Opposition Result	Opposition Result	Rank
Basharmal Sultani	Welterweight	Hikal (EGY); L 12–40	Did not advance				

== Judo ==
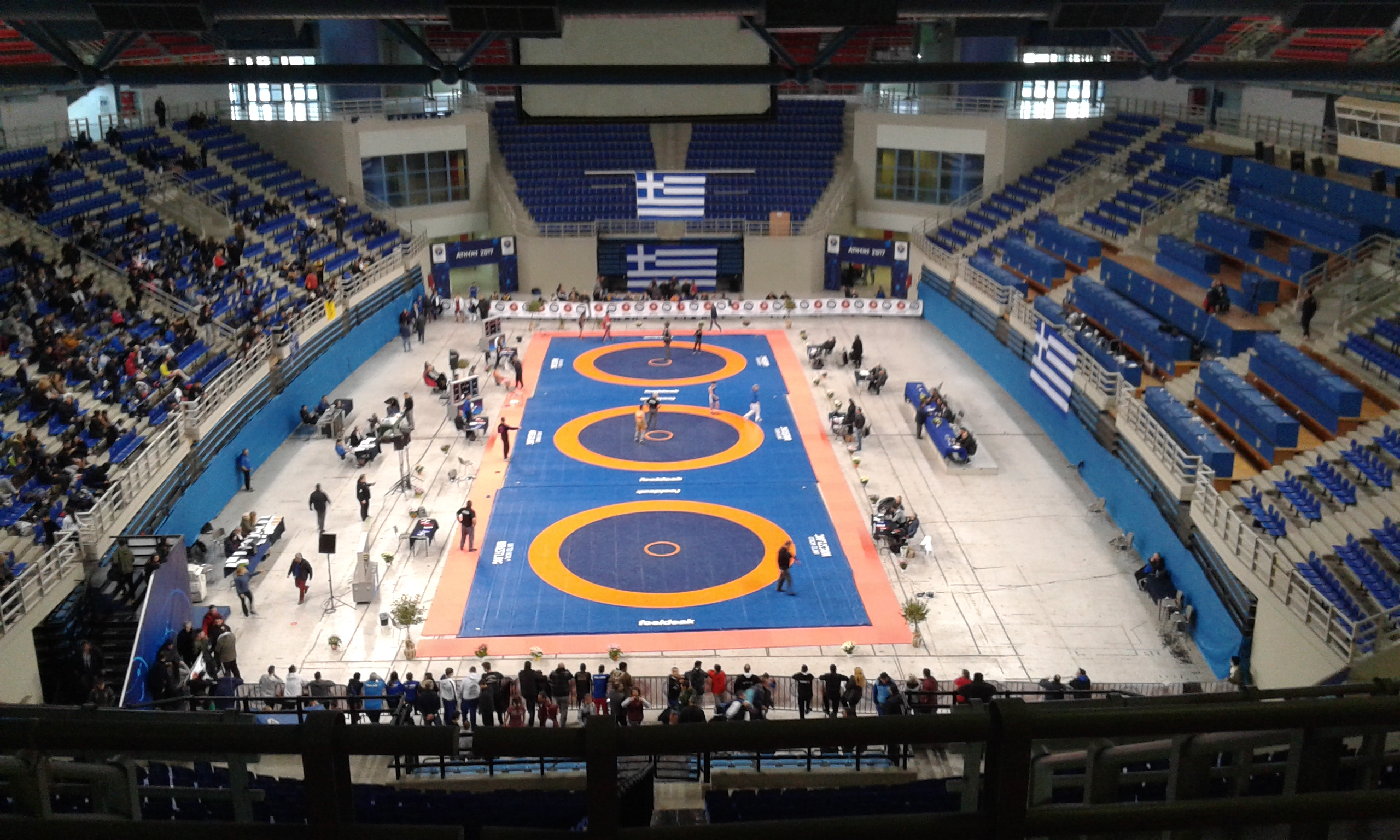
The Ano Liosia Olympic Hall, where Razayee competed in a judo competition and Rahamti in a wrestling contest.

Competing at her only Olympics, Friba Razayee was 18 years old at the time of the Athens Olympic Games, and was the first woman athlete to represent Afghanistan at an Olympic Games. She used a wild card from the IOC to qualify for the Games despite the International Judo Federation hesitant in allowing low-ranked fighters participating in the quadrennial event. In 1994, Razayee's family fled Afghanistan when she was nine and stayed in Pakistan for eight years where she became interested in martial arts. Eight years later, she returned to Afghanistan after the fall of the Taliban and took up boxing before switching to Judo. Razayee said she wanted to use the Olympics as a means of changing the perception of sport in Afghanistan, "My fighting is not as important to me as is my participating. I want to show (everyone) that Afghan women have a place in sport and set the example for all of them." In her Round of 32 match against Cecilia Blanco of Spain on 18 August, she lost after 42 seconds without earning one point. Although she was tearful, Razayee spoke of her pride over competing in the Olympics and recognised her weaknesses, "I tried my best but I couldn't do any thing. Next time I'll win the competition."

Athlete	Event	Round of 32	Round of 16	Quarterfinals	Semifinals	Repechage 1	Repechage 2	Repechage 3	Final / BM	
Athlete	Event	Opposition Result	Opposition Result	Opposition Result	Opposition Result	Opposition Result	Opposition Result	Opposition Result	Opposition Result	Rank
Friba Razayee	Women's −70 kg	Blanco (ESP); L 0000–1000	Did not advance							

== Wrestling ==
At the age of 20, Bashir Ahmad Rahmati was the only athlete to compete in wrestling competition for Afghanistan. This was his only time partaking in the Summer Olympic Games. Under the Olympic Solidarity programme, which aids underdeveloped NOCs in establishing their national and regional sporting structures, Rahamati qualified to compete at Athens in the men's featherweight class (55 kg) of wrestling through a tripartite invitation from the International Federation of Associated Wrestling. He lost two straight matches in the elimination pool to Uzbekistan's Dilshod Mansurov and Russia's Mavlet Batirov, who went on to win the Olympic gold medal at the end of the tournament, with a greater superiority effort, finishing last in the preliminary pool and twenty-second overall in the final standings.

Key:

- VT – Victory by Fall.
- PP – Decision by Points – the loser with technical points.
- PO – Decision by Points – the loser without technical points.

Men's freestyle

Athlete	Event	Elimination Pool			Quarterfinal	Semifinal	Final / BM	
Athlete	Event	Opposition Result	Opposition Result	Rank	Opposition Result	Opposition Result	Opposition Result	Rank
Bashir Ahmad Rahmati	−55 kg	Mansurov (UZB); L 0–4 ^{ST}	Batirov (RUS); L 0–4 ^{ST}	3	Did not advance			22

== See also ==
- Afghanistan at the 2004 Summer Paralympics
