= Abdul Wahab Zahiri =

Afghan sprinter (born 1992)

Personal information
- Born: 27 May 1992 (age 34) Sar Shahi, Nangarhar Province, Afghanistan
- Height: 1.75 m (5 ft 9 in)
- Weight: 68 kg (150 lb)

Sport
- Country: Afghanistan
- Sport: Athletics
- Event: 100 m

Achievements and titles
- Personal best: 100 m: 10.75

Abdul Wahab Zahiri (born 27 May 1992) is an Afghan sprinter. Born in Nangarhar Province, he moved to Pakistan, living there for ten years where he started the sport. He made his debut at the 2016 South Asian Games and was selected to compete at the 2016 Summer Olympics the same year.

At the 2016 Summer Olympics, he did not advance further from the preliminaries of the men's 100 metres. He also competed at the 2017 Asian Athletics Championships and 2018 Asian Games, setting a national record in the former in the men's 4 × 400 metres relay.

== Biography ==
Abdul Wahab Zahiri was born on 27 May 1992 in the village of Sar Shahi in Nangarhar Province, Afghanistan. He lived in Pakistan for ten years. There, he studied at Islamia College University in Peshawar and University of Lahore and started running competitively. In 2015, he had written to the Athletics Federation of India in hopes to train there. He cites Usain Bolt as his inspiration in the sport.

Zahiri made his international debut at the 2016 South Asian Games held in Guwahati, India. The Afghan delegation was the last team to arrive for the Games. He was then selected to compete for Afghanistan at the 2016 Summer Olympics in Rio de Janeiro, Brazil, being selected by the nation after he ran a qualifying time of 10.75 seconds in the 100 metres. He was one of three athletes competing for Afghanistan at the time, competing alongside fellow sprinter Kamia Yousufi and judoka Mohammad Tawfiq Bakhshi. Before his event, he expressed that if Afghan athletes were supported more by the government, they would get achievements, hoping for more athletes to be supported at future editions of the Summer Olympics.

He competed in the preliminaries of the men's 100 metres on 13 August against eight other athletes. In his round, he ran in a time of 11.56 seconds and placed seventh, not advancing further. The eventual winner of the event was Usain Bolt of Jamaica in a time of 9.81 seconds. At the Games, he stated that every athlete had only received 28,000 Indian rupees (325 USD) for the entire duration of the Games, comparing it with the price of his running shoes that costed around one-fifth of the entire stipend given to him.

He then competed at the 2017 Asian Athletics Championships in Bhubaneswar, India. He first competed in the men's 100 metres against seven other athletes on 6 June. He placed fourth in the heats with a time of 11.63 seconds, not advancing further. The winner of the event was Hassan Taftian of Iran. Zahiri was also part of the Afghan relay team in the men's 4 × 400 metres relay. They placed fifth in their heat with a time of 3:20.77 and did not advance, though they had set a new national record in the event.

Before the 2018 Asian Games in Jakarta, Indonesia, the Afghan contingent were on a bus towards Kabul International Airport and encountered American war tanks. In an interview with Press Trust of India, he stated: "You won't understand how we felt when we saw American tanks. We constantly live in terror. But we want to live a peaceful life. We want to achieve our dreams and make our country proud." He also added onto the statement, saying that there was a blast in the capital though had to continue training. He competed in the first round of the men's 100 metres on 25 August, placed last in his heat with a time of 11.65 seconds, not advancing further.

=== International competitions ===
Representing Afghanistan
Year	Competition	Venue	Position	Event	Result
2016	South Asian Games	Guwahati, India	—N/a	—N/a	—N/a
2016	Summer Olympics	Rio de Janeiro, Brazil	7th (h)	100 m	11.56
2017	Asian Championships	Bhubaneswar, India	4th (h)	100 m	11.63
2017	Asian Championships	Bhubaneswar, India	5th (h)	4 × 400 m relay	3:20.77 NR
2018	Asian Games	Jakarta, Indonesia	7th (h)	100 m	11.65
