= Afghanistan at the 2024 Summer Olympics =

- Flag of Afghanistan (Note: Afghanistan still competes under the old tricolor flag used by the former Islamic Republic and not the white banner preferred by the Taliban government.)
- IOC code: AFG
- NOC: National Olympic Committee of the Islamic Republic of Afghanistan
- Website: olympic.af

in Paris, France 26 July 2024 – 11 August 2024
- Competitors: 6 (3 men and 3 women) in 4 sports
- Flag bearers (opening): Sha Mahmood Noor Zahi & Fariba Hashimi
- Flag bearers (closing): Sha Mahmood Noor Zahi & Yulduz Hashimi
- Medals: Gold 0 Silver 0 Bronze 0 Total 0

Summer Olympics appearances (overview)
- 1936; 1948; 1952; 1956; 1960; 1964; 1968; 1972; 1976; 1980; 1984; 1988; 1992; 1996; 2000; 2004; 2008; 2012; 2016; 2020; 2024

Afghanistan competed at the 2024 Summer Olympics in Paris, its first Olympics since the return of Taliban rule in 2021 and the self-imposed exile of many of the country's leading athletes, especially women. It also marked the nation's sixteenth appearance in these games since 1936. The country did not participate in 1952, 1976, 1984 (part of the Soviet-led boycott), 1992, and 2000 (when the Taliban was banned). Afghanistan has taken part in every recent Olympics since 2004. Afghanistan failed to win a medal at the Paris Olympics 2024.

The involvement of Afghan athletes at the 2024 Paris Olympics was arranged by the International Olympic Committee (IOC), the Afghan National Olympic Committee in exile, and the federations of individual sports. The IOC did not allow Taliban officials to participate at the Olympics and only recognizes the Afghan NOC as the representative of Afghan athletes.

In June 2024, Afghanistan announced a six-person, gender-balanced team of athletes competing in athletics, cycling, judo, and swimming, including three veterans of the 2020 Tokyo Olympics. The runners and swimmers can compete via universality slots guaranteed to all Olympic countries and the judoka was confirmed in July by the International Judo Federation. The two women cyclists (Fariba Hashimi and Yulduz Hashimi) had their participation confirmed by the Union Cycliste Internationale in July.

Among the six athletes only one, judoka Mohammad Samim Faizad, lives and trains in Afghanistan.

Five athletes of Afghan origin also competed on the Refugee Olympic Team, which competed in Breaking, Cycling, Judo and Taekwondo. The team included 2020 Olympic veterans Nigara Shaheen and Farzad Mansouri.

== Competitors ==
The following list was the number of confirmed Afghan competitors in the Games.

Sport	Men	Women	Total
Athletics	1	1	2
Cycling	0	2	2
Judo	1	0	1
Swimming	1	0	1
Total	3	3	6

== Athletics ==
Afghanistan received universality slots to send two runners to the Olympics.

Key

- Note–Ranks given for track events are within the athlete's heat only
- Q = Qualified for the next round
- q = Qualified for the next round as a fastest loser or, in field events, by position without achieving the qualifying target
- NR = National record
- N/A = Round not applicable for the event
- Bye = Athlete not required to compete in round

Track & road events

Athlete	Event	Preliminary		Heat		Repechage		Semifinal		Final	
Athlete	Event	Time	Rank	Time	Rank	Time	Rank	Time	Rank	Time	Rank
Sha Mahmood Noor Zahi	Men's 100 m	10.64 NR	4	Did not advance		—		Did not advance			
Kamia Yousufi	Women's 100 m	13.42	9	Did not advance		—		Did not advance			

== Cycling ==
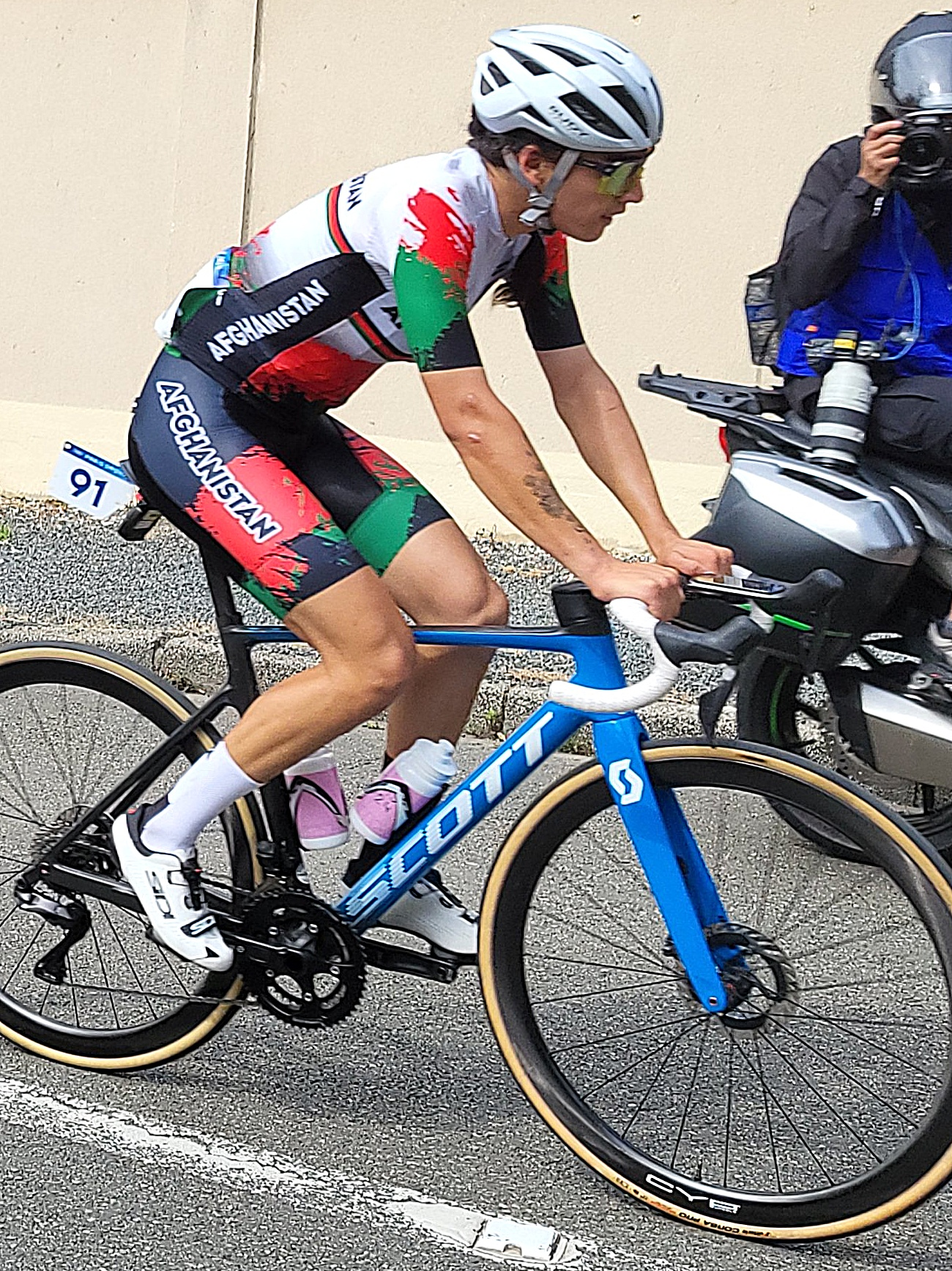
Yulduz Hashimi representing Afghanistan during the Women's Road Race at the Paris 2024 Summer Olympics.

For the first time in Olympic history, cyclists Fariba and Yulduz Hashimi were nominated by the IOC to compete at the games.

Women

Athlete	Event	Time	Rank
Fariba Hashimi	Road race	4:10:47	75
Yulduz Hashimi	Road race	DNF	
Yulduz Hashimi	Time trial	44:29.13	26

== Judo ==
For the first time since 2016, Afghanistan qualified one judoka for the following weight class at the Games. Mohammad Samim Faizad (men's 81 kg) qualified for the games through the allocations of universality slots.

Athlete	Event	Round of 64	Round of 32	Round of 16	Quarterfinals	Semifinals	Repechage	Final / BM	
Athlete	Event	Opposition Result	Opposition Result	Opposition Result	Opposition Result	Opposition Result	Opposition Result	Opposition Result	Rank
Mohammad Samim Faizad	Men's –81 kg	Bye	Borchasvili (AUT); L 00–11	Did not advance					

== Swimming ==
Afghanistan received a universality invitation from FINA.

Athlete	Event	Heat		Semifinal		Final	
Athlete	Event	Time	Rank	Time	Rank	Time	Rank
Fahim Anwari	Men's 50 m freestyle	27.14	63	Did not advance			
