= Afghanistan at the 2016 Summer Olympics =

- IOC code: AFG
- NOC: Afghanistan National Olympic Committee

in Rio de Janeiro
- Competitors: 3 in 2 sports
- Flag bearer: Mohammad Tawfiq Bakhshi
- Medals: Gold 0 Silver 0 Bronze 0 Total 0

Summer Olympics appearances (overview)
- 1936; 1948; 1952; 1956; 1960; 1964; 1968; 1972; 1976; 1980; 1984; 1988; 1992; 1996; 2000; 2004; 2008; 2012; 2016; 2020; 2024; 2028

Afghanistan competed at the 2016 Summer Olympics in Rio de Janeiro, Brazil, from 5 to 21 August 2016. The country's participation at Rio de Janeiro marked its fourth consecutive appearance at the Summer Olympics and fourteenth in total. Afghanistan had officially made its debut in 1936 and missed five editions since then. Rohullah Nikpai, who had previously won a medal for Afghanistan in taekwondo, did not participate. In Rio, Afghanistan failed to earn a single Olympic medal for the first time since 2004.

== Background ==
Afghanistan had participated in twelve Summer Olympics between its debut in the 1936 Summer Olympics in Berlin, Nazi Germany, and the 2016 Summer Olympics in Rio de Janeiro, Brazil. Afghanistan won a total of two bronze medals in the 2008 Beijing Olympics and the 2012 London Olympics respectively, both by Rohullah Nikpai in Taekwondo. The Afghanistan National Olympic Committee sent a total of three athletes to the Games, trimming into half of the roster from London 2012. Track sprinters Abdul Wahib Zahiri and Kamia Yousufi competed in athletics, while judoka Mohammad Tawfiq Bakhshi was selected to carry the Afghan flag in the opening ceremony.

== Athletics ==
Afghanistan was represented by Abdul Wahib Zahiri and Kamia Yousufi in athletics. Both athletes made their Olympic debuts, with Zahiri participating in the Men's 100 m event while Yousufi took part in the Women's 100 m. Yousufi ran her preliminary heat in a full-body kit and hijab. Despite finishing last and not qualifying for the next round, she became Afghanistan's national record holder with 14.02 seconds. Zahiri ran his heats in 11.56 seconds and finished seventh, failing to advance to the quarterfinals.

Key

- Note–Ranks given for track events are within the athlete's heat only
- Q = Qualified for the next round
- q = Qualified for the next round as a fastest loser or, in field events, by position without achieving the qualifying target
- NR = National record
- N/A = Round not applicable for the event
- Bye = Athlete not required to compete in round

Track & road events

Athlete	Event	Heat		Quarterfinal		Semifinal		Final	
Athlete	Event	Time	Rank	Time	Rank	Time	Rank	Time	Rank
Abdul Wahab Zahiri	Men's 100 m	11.56	7	Did not advance					
Kamia Yousufi	Women's 100 m	14.02 NR	8	Did not advance					

== Judo ==
31-year-old Mohammad Tawfiq Bakhski, captain of the Afghan national judo team, represented Afghanistan in men's judo and participated in the men's half-heavyweight category (100 kg) event. Bakhshi lost in the round of 64 to Jorge Fonseca of Portugal.

Athlete	Event	Round of 64	Round of 32	Round of 16	Quarterfinals	Semifinals	Repechage	Final / BM	
Athlete	Event	Opposition Result	Opposition Result	Opposition Result	Opposition Result	Opposition Result	Opposition Result	Opposition Result	Rank
Mohammad Tawfiq Bakhshi	Men's −100 kg	Fonseca (POR); L 000–100	Did not advance						
