= Shaima Rezayee =

Shaima Rezayee شیما رضایی
- Died: May 18, 2005 (aged 23–24); Kabul, Afghanistan
- Cause of death: Shot
- Resting place: Kabul, Afghanistan
- Occupations: TV presenter, actress, DJ
- Television: Tolo TV
- Relatives: Fariba Rezayee

Shaima Rezayee (Dari: شیما رضایی) (1981 – May 18, 2005) was a TV presenter on the Afghan music television channel, Tolo TV. Rezayee was a rising star in the post-Taliban ruled Afghanistan, specially very popular among the youth. She was also the first female western-style music presenter to appear on television in Afghanistan's conservative history.

In March 2005, Shaima Rezayee lost her job on the popular show Hop, an Afghan programme with content similar to the global music video channel MTV, after the programme was criticized by local Islamic clerics. One of the most outspoken critics of Hop was Fazl Hadi Shinwari, a chief justice of the Afghan Supreme Court.

He was quoted as saying "It [Hop] will corrupt our society, culture and most importantly, it will take our people away from Islam and destroy our country... This will make our people accept another culture and make our country a laughingstock around the world."

Rezayee herself was a central focus of the criticism, mainly for her western style of dress. This was believed by the religious authorities to be 'corrupting' the youth of Afghanistan. The only female presenter on the show, Rezayee with her family had fled her home in Kabul to neighbouring Pakistan during the five years that the Taliban controlled Kabul.

On 18 May 2005, Rezayee was shot dead at her home in Char Qala, a neighbourhood of Kabul. She was the first journalist to be killed in Afghanistan since the end of the Afghan civil war in 2001. Press freedom organisation Reporters sans frontières and local authorities believe her killing was linked to her work as a presenter on Tolo TV. Tolo TV is the first private TV station established in Afghanistan. Previously, there has always been only one TV station in Kabul which was run and controlled by the government.

== See also ==
- Fariba Rezayee
