= Afghanistan at the 2012 Summer Olympics =

- IOC code: AFG
- NOC: Afghanistan National Olympic Committee

in London
- Competitors: 6 in 4 sports
- Flag bearer: Nesar Ahmad Bahave (opening) Rohullah Nikpai (closing)
- Medals Ranked 79th: Gold 0 Silver 0 Bronze 1 Total 1

Summer Olympics appearances (overview)
- 1936; 1948; 1952; 1956; 1960; 1964; 1968; 1972; 1976; 1980; 1984; 1988; 1992; 1996; 2000; 2004; 2008; 2012; 2016; 2020; 2024

Afghanistan competed at the 2012 Summer Olympics in London, United Kingdom from 27 July to 12 August 2012. Six Afghan athletes were selected for the Games, competing in four different sporting events. Rohullah Nikpai, who won Afghanistan's first ever Olympic medal at the 2008 Games, managed to repeat his bronze medal in the men's 68 kg taekwondo event for the second time.

== Medalists ==
The following Afghan competitors won medals at the Games. In the 'by discipline' sections below, medallists' names are in bold.

Medal	Name	Sport	Event	Date
Bronze	Rohullah Nikpai	Taekwondo	Men's 68 kg	9 August

== Athletics ==
Afghanistan has selected two athletes by wildcard. Both athletes competed in the 100 m sprint and did not qualify to the quarterfinals. Tahmina Kohistani might have been the slowest runner in the women's 100m, however; taking part at the Olympics was considered a triumph due to the pressures against women in sport. Kohistani wishes that her performance would inspire other Afghan women to enter sports.

Key

- Note–Ranks given for track events are within the athlete's heat only
- **Q** = Qualified for the next round
- **q** = Qualified for the next round as a fastest loser or, in field events, by position without achieving the qualifying target
- **NR** = National record
- N/A = Round not applicable for the event
- Bye = Athlete not required to compete in round

Track & road events

Athlete	Event	Heat		Quarterfinal		Semifinal		Final	
Athlete	Event	Result	Rank	Result	Rank	Result	Rank	Result	Rank
Massoud Azizi	Men's 100 m	11.19	6	did not advance					
Tahmina Kohistani	Women's 100 m	14.42	9	did not advance					

== Boxing ==
Afghanistan was given a tripartite invitation to compete in boxing. Despite losing in the first round, boxer Ajmal Faisal enjoyed the Olympic experience, stating that there is a lack of boxing facilities and opposition by the Taliban and other political groups towards boxing. He also credited AIBA for providing a training camp for him and other fighters in order to "compete and last for three rounds against tougher opponents."

Athlete	Event	Round of 32	Round of 16	Quarterfinal	Semifinal	Final	
Athlete	Event	Opposition Result	Opposition Result	Opposition Result	Opposition Result	Opposition Result	Rank
Ajmal Faisal	Men's flyweight	Oubaali (FRA); **L** 9–22	did not advance				

== Judo ==
Afghanistan's Ajmal Faizzada was given an invitation to compete in judo and competed in the -66 kg weight class. He lost to Hungary's Miklós Ungvári in the first round match by harai makikomi.

Athlete	Event	Round of 64	Round of 32	Round of 16	Quarterfinals	Semifinals	Repechage	Final / BM	
Athlete	Event	Opposition Result	Opposition Result	Opposition Result	Opposition Result	Opposition Result	Opposition Result	Opposition Result	Rank
Ajmal Faizzada	Men's −66 kg	Ungvári (HUN); **L** 0000–0100	did not advance						

== Taekwondo ==
Afghanistan qualified two male athletes through their performance at the 2011 Asian Taekwondo Olympic Qualification Tournament. 2008 Olympic and 2011 World bronze medalist Rohullah Nikpai competed in the -68 kg category and 2010 Asian Games silver medalist Nesar Ahmad Bahave competed in the -80 kg category. Rohullah Nikpai managed repeat his performance from Beijing four years ago in a heavier weight category by winning the bronze medal after defeating Great Britain's Martin Stamper. Nesar Ahmad Bahave also advanced to the bronze medal match; however, having severe injuries throughout the entire competition, he was unable to defeat Italy's Mauro Sarmiento, and was taken to the hospital shortly after the match. Despite his defeat, Bahave earned much respect from his people in Afghanistan.

Athlete	Event	Round of 16	Quarterfinals	Semifinals	Repechage	Bronze Medal	Final	
Athlete	Event	Opposition Result	Opposition Result	Opposition Result	Opposition Result	Opposition Result	Opposition Result	Rank
**Rohullah Nikpai**	Men's −68 kg	Łoniewski (POL); **W** 12–5	Motamed (IRI); **L** 4–5	Did not advance	Boui (CAF); **W** 14–2	Stamper (GBR); **W** 5–3	Did not advance	3rd place, bronze medalist(s)
Nesar Ahmad Bahave	Men's −80 kg	Chernoubi (MAR); **W** 4–3	Crismanich (ARG); **L** 1–9	Did not advance	Scott (NZL); **W** 11–6	Sarmiento (ITA); **L** 0–4	Did not advance	5
