= Afghanistan at the 1936 Summer Olympics =

- IOC code: AFG
- NOC: Afghanistan National Olympic Committee

in Berlin
- Competitors: 15 in 2 sports
- Medals: Gold 0 Silver 0 Bronze 0 Total 0

Summer Olympics appearances (overview)
- 1936; 1948; 1952; 1956; 1960; 1964; 1968; 1972; 1976; 1980; 1984; 1988; 1992; 1996; 2000; 2004; 2008; 2012; 2016; 2020; 2024

Afghanistan sent a delegation to compete at the 1936 Summer Olympics Berlin, Germany, from 1 to 16 August 1936. This was the nation's first appearance at a Summer Olympic Games and sent 19 competitors (but names of only 17 are known). Eighteen of them were supposed to compete in the field hockey where they finished runner up in their group and not advancing to the knockout stage. Out of them only 12 competed in field hockey. Two, including one hockey player, competed in the sport of athletics with Mohammad Khan competing in the 100 meters sprint and long jump, failing to advance to the next stage of either of those events. He was also entered as a field hockey player. However, he did not start in field hockey. Abdul Rahim competed in the shot put with not advancing to the final.

== Athletics ==
Afghanistan sent two athletes to compete in the athletics competitions. One was 25 year old, Mohammad Khan who in his only Olympics competed in two events. His first event was the men's 100 m which was held on the 26 July. Competing in heat three, he ended in last place to not qualify for the following stage. The other event that he competed in was the men's Long jump which was held eight days later. Khan wouldn't qualify to the semi-final as he wouldn't reach the 7.15 meters qualifying distance to go through to the semi-final. His name was also entered in field hockey. However, he did not start in the field hockey.

Twenty-three year old Abdul Rahim competed in his only Olympics, and he competed in only one event during the games. That being the men's Shot put which was held on 2 August. Much like Khan, he wouldn't advance to the final, as he fell short of the 14.50 meters required to advance.

Track & road events

Athlete	Event	Heat		Quarterfinal		Semifinal		Final	
Athlete	Event	Result	Rank	Result	Rank	Result	Rank	Result	Rank
Mohammad Khan	Men's 100 m		6	did not advance					

Field events

Athlete	Event	Qualification		Final	
Athlete	Event	Distance	Position	Distance	Position
Mohammad Khan	Men's Long jump		—	did not advance	
Abdul Rahim	Men's Shot put		—	did not advance	

== Field Hockey ==
Afghanistan entered a team in the field hockey competition for the first time. The team entered a squad of 18 (two of them being unknown). Six out of them did not start. The national team were drawn in Group B with Denmark and host nation, Germany.

Shahzada Muhammad Yusuf was captain of the field hockey team. However, he did not play in any of the two matches. He had represented the Indian field hockey team in the 1928 Summer Olympics at Amsterdam.

No.	Pos.	Player	DoB	Age	Caps	Club	Tournament games	Tournament goals
	HB	Shahzada Muhammad Yusuf	1896	40	?		0	0
		Abouwi Ahmad Shah			?		0	?
	B	Jammal-ud-Din Affendi	June 23, 1908	28	?		2	?
	GK	Sayed Ali Atta	August 25, 1913	22	?		2	?
	FW	Sayed Ali Baba	March 12, 1915	21	?		2	?
	HB	Mohammad Asif Shazada	March 12, 1919	17	?		2	?
	HB	Sayed Mohammad Ayub	November 20, 1908	27	?		2	?
	FW	Mian Faruq Shah	June 3, 1907	29	?		1	?
	B	Hussain Fazal	October 21, 1906	29	?		2	?
	HB	Saadat Malook Shazada	August 26, 1916	19	?		2	?
	FW/B	Zahir Shah Al-Zadah	November 18, 1910	25	?		2	?
	FW	Shuja ud-Din	September 12, 1913	22	?		2	?
	FW	Mohammad Sultan	December 23, 1918	17	?		2	1
	FW	Sardar Abdul Wahid	March 12, 1901	35	?		1	?

=== Group B ===
Pos	Team	Pld	W	D	L	GF	GA	GD	Pts	Qualification
1	Germany (H)	2	2	0	0	10	1	+9	4	Semi-finals
2	Afghanistan	2	0	1	1	7	10	−3	1	
3	Denmark	2	0	1	1	6	12	−6	1	

Source: TheSports.org
(H) Hosts

=== Games ===
4 August 1936
1800

Afghanistan	6 – 6	Denmark

Umpires:
R. Jossey (Ger)
A. Croset (Swi)

8 August 1936
1800

Afghanistan	1 – 4	Germany

Umpires:
A. du Bue (Bel)
A. Demaurex (Swi)
