= Afghanistan at the 2020 Summer Olympics =

- IOC code: AFG
- NOC: Afghanistan National Olympic Committee

in Tokyo, Japan July 23, 2021 – August 8, 2021
- Competitors: 5 (4 men and 1 woman) in 4 sports
- Flag bearers (opening): Farzad Mansouri; Kamia Yousufi
- Flag bearer (closing): N/A
- Medals: Gold 0 Silver 0 Bronze 0 Total 0

Summer Olympics appearances (overview)
- 1936; 1948; 1952; 1956; 1960; 1964; 1968; 1972; 1976; 1980; 1984; 1988; 1992; 1996; 2000; 2004; 2008; 2012; 2016; 2020; 2024

Afghanistan competed at the 2020 Summer Olympics in Tokyo. Originally scheduled to take place from 24 July to 9 August 2020, the Games were postponed to 23 July to 8 August 2021, because of the COVID-19 pandemic.

== Competitors ==
The following is the list of number of competitors in the Games.

| Sport | Men | Women | Total |
|---|---|---|---|
| Athletics | 1 | 1 | 2 |
| Shooting | 1 | 0 | 1 |
| Swimming | 1 | 0 | 1 |
| Taekwondo | 1 | 0 | 1 |
| Total | 4 | 1 | 5 |

== Athletics ==
Afghanistan received universality slots from World Athletics to send two athletes to the Olympics.

Key

- Note–Ranks given for track events are within the athlete's heat only
- Q = Qualified for the next round
- q = Qualified for the next round as a fastest loser or, in field events, by position without achieving the qualifying target
- NR = National record
- N/A = Round not applicable for the event
- Bye = Athlete not required to compete in round

Track & road events

| Athlete | Event | Heat | | Quarterfinal | | Semifinal | | Final | |
| Athlete | Event | Result | Rank | Result | Rank | Result | Rank | Result | Rank |
|---|---|---|---|---|---|---|---|---|---|
| Sha Mahmood Noor Zahi | Men's 100 m | 11.04 PB | 7 | did not advance | | | | | |
| Kamia Yousufi | Women's 100 m | 13.29 NR | 7 | did not advance | | | | | |

== Shooting ==
Afghanistan received an invitation from the Tripartite Commission to send a men's rifle shooter to the Olympics, as long as the minimum qualifying score (MQS) was met, marking the nation's Olympic debut in the sport.

| Athlete | Event | Qualification | | Final | |
| Athlete | Event | Points | Rank | Points | Rank |
|---|---|---|---|---|---|
| Mahdi Yovari | Men's 10 m air rifle | 601.4 | 47 | did not advance | |

Qualification Legend: Q = Qualify for the next round; q = Qualify for the bronze medal (shotgun)

== Swimming ==
Afghanistan received a universality invitation from FINA to send one top-ranked swimmers in their respective individual events to the Olympics, based on the FINA Points System of June 28, 2021. Fahim Anwari was the only swimmer to represent Afghanistan in Tokyo, having competed in the Men's 50 m freestyle event. He did not advance to the semifinals, placing 69th in the heats.

| Athlete | Event | Heat | | Semifinal | | Final | |
| Athlete | Event | Time | Rank | Time | Rank | Time | Rank |
|---|---|---|---|---|---|---|---|
| Fahim Anwari | Men's 50 m freestyle | 27.67 | 69 | did not advance | | | |

== Taekwondo ==
Afghanistan received an invitation from the Tripartite Commission.

| Athlete | Event | Round of 16 | Quarterfinals | Semifinals | Repechage | Final / BM | |
| Athlete | Event | Opposition Result | Opposition Result | Opposition Result | Opposition Result | Opposition Result | Rank |
|---|---|---|---|---|---|---|---|
| Farzad Mansouri | Men's +80 kg | In K-d (KOR); L 12–13 | did not advance | | | | |
