= Antoine Gakeme =

Burundian middle-distance runner

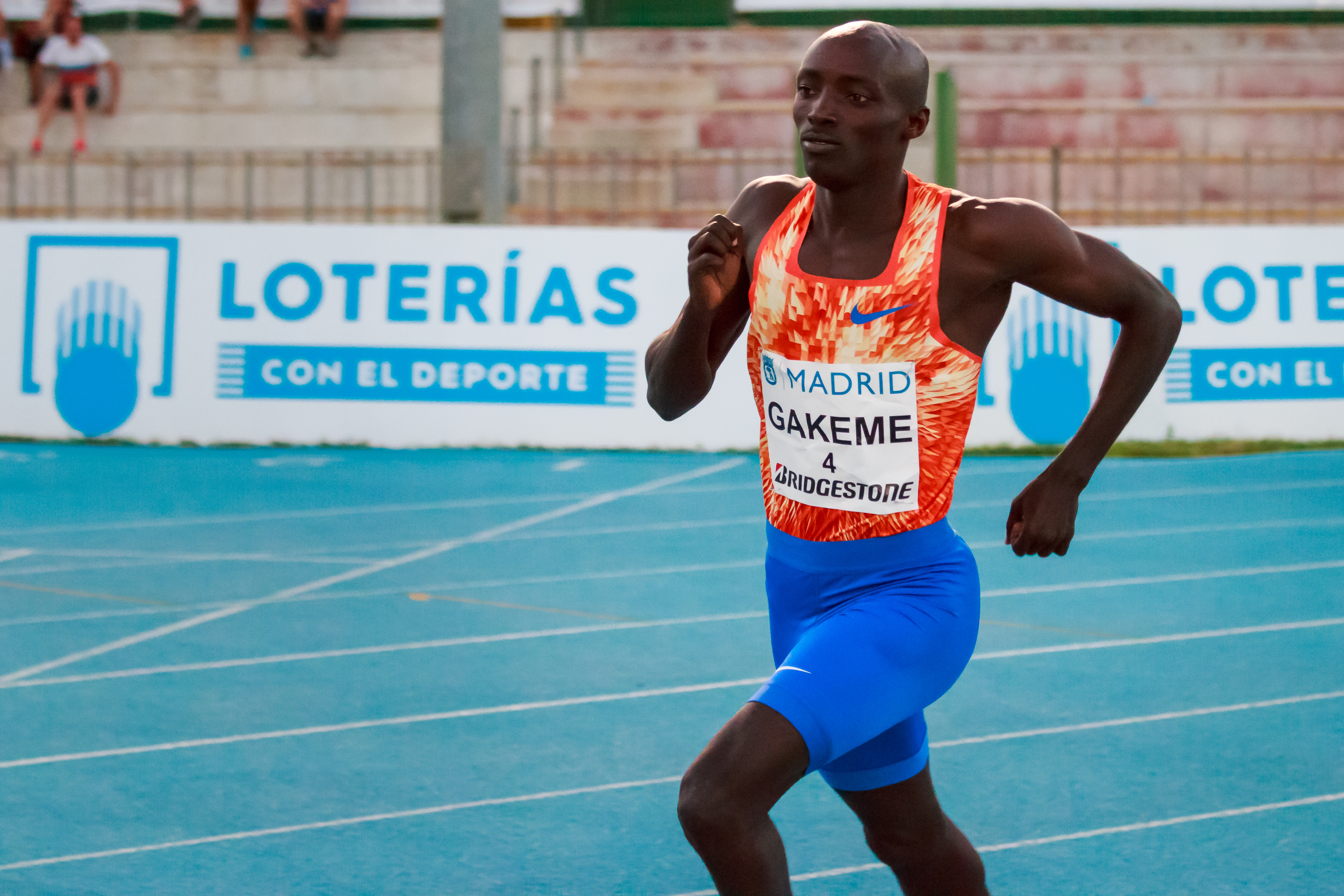
- Gakeme running during the IAAF World Challenge Meeting Madrid 2017

Medal record

Men's athletics

Representing Burundi

World Indoor Championships
Silver medal – second place	2016 Portland	800 m

Antoine Gakeme (born 24 December 1991) is a Burundian middle-distance runner who competes mainly in the 800 metres. He represented Burundi at the 2013 World Championships and was a finalist at the 2014 African Championships.

== Career ==
Gakeme represented Burundi in the 800 metres at the 2013 World Championships; he set personal bests in both the heats (1:46.70) and semi-finals (1:45.39), but failed to qualify for the final. At the 2014 African Championships in Marrakesh he placed seventh. In 2015, Gakeme won the 800 metres at the European Champion Clubs Cup, running a championship record 1:45.77; he was also part of Playas de Castellón's 4 × 400 metres relay team, which won in 3:07.92. Playas de Castellón won the club championship by two points.

Gakeme set his personal best (1:44.09) in Madrid in July 2015.
