= Afghanistan at the 1972 Summer Olympics =

- IOC code: AFG
- NOC: Afghanistan National Olympic Committee

in Munichm West Germany 26 August – 11 September 1972
- Competitors: 8 (men) in 1 sport
- Flag bearer: Ghulam Dastagir (Wrestling)
- Medals: Gold 0 Silver 0 Bronze 0 Total 0

Summer Olympics appearances (overview)
- 1936; 1948; 1952; 1956; 1960; 1964; 1968; 1972; 1976; 1980; 1984; 1988; 1992; 1996; 2000; 2004; 2008; 2012; 2016; 2020; 2024

Afghanistan competed at the 1972 Summer Olympics in Munich, West Germany from August 26, 1972, to September 11, 1972. They sent eight athletes who all competed in wrestling.

== Wrestling ==
Men's freestyle

Athlete	Event	Round 1	Round 2	Round 3	Round 4	Round 5	Final / BM	
Athlete	Event	Opposition Result	Opposition Result	Opposition Result	Opposition Result	Opposition Result	Opposition Result	Rank
Mohammad Arref	−52 kg	Alakhverdiyev (URS); L 1-3	Kato (JPN); L 0-4	did not advance				18
Ghulam Sideer	−57 kg	Darlev (YUG); W Fall	Ramos (CUB); L 1-3	Nath (IND); L Fall	did not advance			14
Ahmad Djan	−62 kg	Kiyoshi Abe (JPN); L 0.5-3.5	Tanner (SUI); W 3-1	Weisenberger (FRG); L 1-3	did not advance			15
Shakar Khan Shakar	−74 kg	Jan Karlsson (SWE); L Fall	Muhammad Yaghoud (PAK); D Draw	did not advance				18
Ghulam Dastagir	−82 kg	Elmgren (SWE); L Fall	Wypiorczyk (POL); L Fall	did not advance				23

Men's Greco-Roman

Athlete	Event	Round 1	Round 2	Round 3	Round 4	Round 5	Final / BM	
Athlete	Event	Opposition Result	Opposition Result	Opposition Result	Opposition Result	Opposition Result	Opposition Result	Rank
Alam Mir	−57 kg	Kazakov (URS); L 0.5-3.5	Čović (YUG); L Fall	did not advance				23
Mohammad Ebrahimi	−62 kg	Mygiakis (GRE); L Fall	did not advance					19
Djan-Aka Djan	−68 kg	Weirum (DEN); L 1-3	Bremauntz (MEX); W Fall	Schöndorfer (FRG); L Fall	did not advance			11
