= Ajmal Faisal =

Afghan boxer (born 1990)

Ajmal Faisal (born August 14, 1990, Kabul) is an Afghan boxer. Faisal competed at the 2012 Summer Olympics, representing Afghanistan in the Men's Flyweight. He was defeated in the Round of 32 by France's Nordine Oubaali 22–9.
