= Afghanistan at the 1960 Summer Olympics =

- IOC code: AFG
- NOC: Afghanistan National Olympic Committee

in Rome
- Competitors: 12 in 2 sports
- Medals: Gold 0 Silver 0 Bronze 0 Total 0

Summer Olympics appearances (overview)
- 1936; 1948; 1952; 1956; 1960; 1964; 1968; 1972; 1976; 1980; 1984; 1988; 1992; 1996; 2000; 2004; 2008; 2012; 2016; 2020; 2024

Afghanistan competed at the 1960 Summer Olympics in Rome.

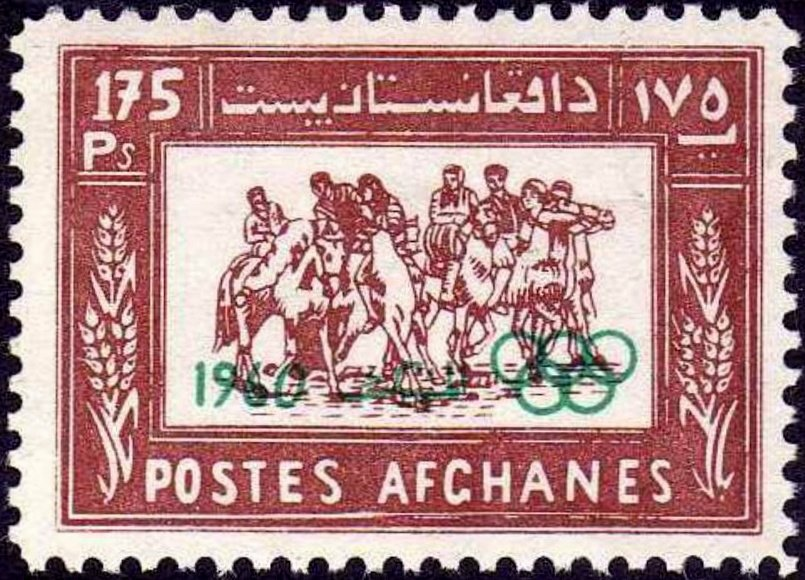
Buzkashi game on Afghan stamp for the 1960 Summer Olympics

== Athletics ==
Athletes	Events	Heat Round 1		Heat Round 2		Semifinal		Final	
Athletes	Events	Result	Rank	Result	Rank	Result	Rank	Result	Rank
Abdul Ghafar Ghafoori; Abdul Hadi Shekaib; Habib Sayed; Ali Yusuf Zaid	Men's 4 × 100 m Relay	44.4	3	Did not advance					
Abdul Hadi Shekaib	Men's 100m	11.6	7	Did not advance					
Abdul Wardak	Men's 110m hurdles	-	-	Retired					
Abdul Wardak	Men's javelin throw	64.20	-	Did not advance					
Ali Yusuf Zaid	Men's 200m	23.1	6	Did not advance					
Habib Sayed	Men's 400m	53.8	7	Did not advance					

== Wrestling ==
Athletes	Events	1st Round	2nd Round	3rd Round	4th Round	5th Round	6th Round	7th Round	Final Rank
Faiz Mohammad Khakshar	-52 kg	L (0–4)	L (0–4)	Did not advance				-	13
Mohamad Kederi	-62 kg	L (0–4)	L (1–3)	Did not advance					21
Amir Khalunder	-67 kg	L (0–4)	L (0–4)	Did not advance				-	24
Sultan Dost	-73 kg	L (1–3)	L (1–3)	Did not advance				-	17
Mohammad Khokan	-79 kg	L (0–4)	BYE	L (1–3)	Did not advance		-		12
Mohiddin Gunga	-87 kg	L (0–4)	L (0–4)	Did not advance				-	18
Nizamuddin Subhani	+87 kg	L (0–4)	L (1–3)	Did not advance				-	14
