= Lima Azimi =

Afghan sprinter

Lima Azimi, born in 1981 or 1982, is an Afghan track and field athlete.

Azimi put up attention by representing her country at the 2003 World Championships in Athletics in Paris. She was the first woman to represent Afghanistan at an international sports event, following the fall of the Taliban.

She competed in the 100 metre sprint, running "in a grey T-shirt and a pair of navy-blue tracksuit bottoms". She reportedly had no idea how to use the starting blocks, never having had the opportunity to train with them. Azimi finished last in her heat, with a time of 18.37 seconds - a national record, since she was the first Afghan to run such a race.

At the time of the 2003 World Athletics Championships, Azimi was a student of English language and literature at Kabul University.

She decided not to compete for a place at the 2004 Athens Olympics.

== See also ==
- Robina Muqimyar
