= Mahmoudiyeh FC =

Afghan football club

- Full name: Mahmoudiyeh Football Club
- Founded: 1934; 92 years ago
- Ground: ?, Kabul, Afghanistan
Home colours	Away colours

Mahmoudiyeh Football Club (Persian: کلپ فوتبال محمودیه) is a football club from Afghanistan. The club was founded in 1934.

== History ==
The club is generally regarded as Afghanistan’s first formally organised football club, although school football teams had competed in Kabul since the 1920s. The club was founded by graduates of local schools in 1934.

In 1937, the team travelled to British India for a series of matches. A Dari historical account citing the 1315 Kabul Yearbook states that the delegation was led by Mohammad Farooq Khan and played in cities including Peshawar, Lahore, Jalandhar, Patiala and Ludhiana. It records 11 matches, comprising six victories, two draws and three defeats. RSSSF and later football histories instead report 18 matches, with eight victories, one draw and nine defeats.

Mahmoudiyeh supplied several players to Afghanistan’s early national team. Four took part in the 1948 Olympic Games as members of the Afghanistan national football team: Wahid Aitimadi, Abdul Ahad Kharot, Abdul Ghafoor Assar and Abdul Ghani Assar.
