= List of Afghan records in athletics =

The following are the national records in athletics in Afghanistan maintained by the Afghanistan Athletic Federation.

== Outdoor ==
Key to tables: Awaiting ratification Record not kept by Afghanistan Athletic Federation Not ratified or later rescinded by Afghanistan Athletic Federation

=== Men ===
Event	Record	Athlete	Date	Meet	Place	Ref.
100 m	10.64 (+0.6 m/s)	Sha Mahmood Noor Zahi	3 August 2024	Olympic Games	Paris, France	
200 m	21.65 (+0.3 m/s)	Sha Mahmood Noor Zahi	30 May 2022		Mashhad, Iran	
400 m	49.59	Said Gilani	25 June 2017	Norddeutsche Meisterschaften	Berlin, Germany	
400 m	49.0 h	Habib Zareef	1963		Kabul, Afghanistan	
800 m	1:53.62	Wais Ibrahim Khairandesh	12 June 2016	Portland Track Festival	Portland, United States	
1500 m	4:00.98	Sebghatullah Ismaili	23 August 2020		Frauenfeld, Switzerland	
3000 m	8:52.57	Aman Haidari	3 September 2010		Molde, Norway	
5000 m	15:52.68	Aman Haidari	6 August 2010		Ravnanger, Norway	
10,000 m	33:25.6 h	Nouruddin	1961		Kabul, Afghanistan	
Half marathon	1:13:16	Mohammad Karim Yaqoot	16 April 2011		Dushanbe, Tajikistan	
Marathon	2:28:46	Waheed Karim	2 December 1990	California International Marathon	Sacramento, United States	
110 m hurdles	15.45 (−1.2 m/s)	Said Gilani	17 June 2018		Papenburg, Germany	
400 m hurdles	54.19	Said Gilani	10 June 2017	Niedersächsische & Bremer Meisterschaften	Göttingen, Germany	
3000 m steeplechase	10:52.46	Noor Ahmad Zoori	13 May 2017		Maria Enzersdorf, Austria	
High jump	1.90 m	Abdoul Skour	1973		Kabul, Afghanistan	
Pole vault	3.72 m	Said Gilani	29 May 2014	Nationales Himmelfahrtssportfest	Bremen, Germany	
Pole vault	3.85 m	Alyas Ahmady	23 April 2022	Maine State Classic	Lewiston, United States	
Pole vault	3.95 m	Alyas Ahmady	6 April 2024	CGA Spring invite	New London, United States	
Long jump	7.53 m (−0.8 m/s)	Mohammedreza Firozkohi	12 April 2021		Mashhad, Iran	
Triple jump	12.99 m NWI	Mohammed Anwar	1940		Kabul, Afghanistan	
Shot put	14.90 m	Noorullah Osmani	16 October 2016		Kabul, Afghanistan	
Discus throw	39.90 m	Abdoul Hakim	1941		Kabul, Afghanistan	
Hammer throw	27.23 m	Abbas Taheri Nilsson	12 September 2020		Växjö, Sweden	
Javelin throw	49.59 m	Said Gilani	29 June 2014	Landesmeisterschaften Mehrkampf	Papenburg, Germany	
Decathlon	6136 pts	Said Gilani	2–3 June 2018		Papenburg, Germany	
Decathlon	100m (wind) / Long jump (wind) / Shot put / High jump / 400m / 110m H (wind) / Discus / Pole vault / Javelin / 1500m; 11.49 (−1.0 m/s) / 6.37 m (±0.0 m/s) / 10.05 m / 1.64 m / 50.26 / 15.89 (NWI) / 32.41 m / 3.60 m / 44.82 m / 4:45.41					
20 km walk (road)						
50 km walk (road)						
4 × 100 m relay	43.11	Afghanistan; M. Azizi; W. Anwari; A. Q. Ghanazda; G. S. Hamkar	7 February 2010	South Asian Games	Dhaka, Bangladesh	
4 × 400 m relay	3:20.77	Afghanistan; Z. Wahab; W. Khairandesh; G. Zaher; S. Koshal	9 July 2017		Bhubaneswar, India	

=== Women ===
Event	Record	Athlete	Date	Meet	Place	Ref.
100 m	13.23 (−0.9 m/s)	Marwa Saleem	3 July 2021	Phoenix Mini Meet	Toronto, Canada	
200 m	27.39 (−0.2 m/s)	Kamia Yousufi	17 March 2024	NSW Championships	Sydney, Australia	
400 m	1:12.72	Yalda Amini	13 June 2018		Sipoo, Finland	
800 m	2:38.28	Mehrangiz Bijanpoor (Note: Mehrangiz Bijanpoor became a Norwegian citizen on 27 September 2007)	19 August 2007		Oslo, Norway	
1500 m	5:27.35	Mehrangiz Bijanpoor (Note: Mehrangiz Bijanpoor became a Norwegian citizen on 27 September 2007)	3 June 2007		Asker, Norway	
3000 m	11:51.02	Mehrangiz Bijanpoor (Note: Mehrangiz Bijanpoor became a Norwegian citizen on 27 September 2007)	17 June 2007		Nadderud, Norway	
5000 m	21:33.59	Shabnam Fayyaz	26 April 2019		Terre Haute, United States	
5 km (road)	24:02+	Sahar Zamir	13 October 2013	Chicago Marathon	Chicago, United States	
10,000 m	46:11.52	Shabnam Fayyaz	13 April 2019		Greencastle, United States	
10 km (road)	48:22+	Sahar Zamir	13 October 2013	Chicago Marathon	Chicago, United States	
15 km (road)	1:13:06+	Sahar Zamir	13 October 2013	Chicago Marathon	Chicago, United States	
20 km (road)	1:39:10+	Sahar Zamir	13 October 2013	Chicago Marathon	Chicago, United States	
Half marathon	1:45:06+	Sahar Zamir	13 October 2013	Chicago Marathon	Chicago, United States	
Half marathon	1:38:57 (Note: per result source Afaq started for Canada)	Farahnaz Afaq	14 October 2018	Winnipeg Fire Paramedic Service Half Marathon	Winnipeg, Canada	
Marathon	3:24:07	Sahar Zamir	15 September 2007		Bismarck, United States	
Marathon	3:16:47 (Note: doubtful timing)	Layegha Hashemi	20 September 2009	Sydney Marathon	Sydney, Australia	
100 m hurdles						
400 m hurdles						
3000 m steeplechase						
High jump	1.11 m	Asma Mohammadi	22 September 2016		Rjukan, Norway	
Pole vault	1.40 m	Jasmin Shams	23 July 2001		Finnsnes, Norway	
Long jump	3.76 m (−2.9 m/s)	Yalda Amini	18 July 2017	Veikkolan Nuorisokilpailut	Kirkkonummi, Finland	
Triple jump	9.14 m NWI	Farkhunda Muhtaj	14 June 2011		Toronto, Canada	
Shot put	4.78 m	Yalda Amini	20 September 2017		Helsinki, Finland	
Discus throw	12.78 m	Asra Mohammadi	18 September 2016		Rjukan, Norway	
Hammer throw	13.10 m	Yalda Amini	15 May 2017	Painon ja moukarinheittokilpailut	Helsinki, Finland	
Javelin throw						
Heptathlon						
Heptathlon	100m H (wind) / High jump / Shot put / 200m (wind) / Long jump (wind) / Javelin / 800m					
20 km walk (road)						
50 km walk (road)						
4 × 100 m relay						
4 × 400 m relay						

== Indoor ==
=== Men ===
Event	Record	Athlete	Date	Meet	Place	Ref.
60 m	7.25	Masoud Azizi	31 October 2009	Asian Indoor Games	Hanoi, Vietnam	
60 m	6.97	Shah Mahmood Noor Zahi	18 February 2024	Asian Championships	Tehran, Iran	
200 m	22.67	Said Gilani	20 January 2018	NLV+BLV – Hallen Meisterschaft	Hanover, Germany	
400 m	50.90	Said Gilani	6 February 2016	Norddeutsche Meisterschaften	Hanover, GER	
600 m	1:22.89	Wais Ibrahim Khairandesh	1 March 2013	NJCAA Championships	Lubbock, United States	
800 m	1:57.36	Wais Ibrahim Khairandesh	18 March 2016	World Championships	Portland, United States	
1000 m	2:42.18	Wais Ibrahim Khairandesh	23 February 2013	Glendale Last Chance	Glendale, United States	
1500 m	4:07.14	Dost Mohammed Sultani	12 February 2015	Innandørsstevne	Sandnes, Norway	
3000 m	9:30.15	Mohammad Karim Yaqout	12 February 2015	22nd Fajr International Championships	Tehran, Iran	
60 m hurdles	8.64	Said Gilani	14 January 2018	Neujahrssportfest	Bremen, Germany	
High jump	1.70 m (Note: record set during heptathlon competition)	Said Gilani	15 February 2014	Hamburger und Schleswig-Holsteinische Hallenmeisterschaften	Hamburg, Germany	
Pole vault	3.75 m (Note: outdoor mark ratified as absolute record)	Thamime Khan	15 January 2022		Aubière, France	
Pole vault	3.77 m (Note: outdoor mark ratified as absolute record)	Thamime Khan	5 February 2022	Championnats Régionaux AURA	Aubière, France	
Pole vault	4.00 m (Note: outdoor mark ratified as absolute record)	Alyas Ahmady	4 February 2023	Maine State Championships	Lewiston, United States	
Pole vault	4.30 m (Note: outdoor mark ratified as absolute record)	Alyas Ahmady	25 January 2025	USM Husky Invitational	Gorham, United States	
Long jump	7.18 m	Mohammad Reza Firozkohi	5 January 2022		Tehran, Iran	
Triple jump	11.00 m	Nassim Hosseini	18 December 2010		Orléans, France	
Shot put	14.05 m	Noor Ullah Osmani	18 September 2017	Asian Indoor and Martial Arts Games	Ashgabat, Turkmenistan	
Heptathlon	1955 pts	Kazemi Hogat	2 February 2018		Tehran, Iran	
Heptathlon	60m / Long jump / Shot put / High jump / 60m H / Pole vault / 1000m; 8.49 / 4.60 m / 6.91 m / – / 12.23 / – / 3:06.47					
5000 m walk						
4 × 400 m relay						

=== Women ===
Event	Record	Athlete	Date	Meet	Place	Ref.
60 m	8.34	Nasrin Ashgari	9 January 2020		Tehran, Iran	
200 m	34.84	Yalda Amini	4 February 2017	Helsy-hallikilpailut	Helsinki, Finland	
400 m	1:12.16	Yalda Amini	11 February 2018		Lahti, Finland	
800 m	2:47.42	Somayeh Rezaei	14 February 2013		Tehran, Iran	
1500 m	5:53.68	Madineh Ahmadi	15 February 2013		Tehran, Iran	
3000 m	12:16.80	Shabnam Fayyaz	31 January 2020		Terre Haute, United States	
5000 m	21:19.71 (Note: outdoor mark ratified as absolute record)	Shabnam Fayyaz	22 February 2020		Terre Haute, United States	
60 m hurdles	13.58	Yalda Amini	27 April 2017	Tarmon kevätottelut	Helsinki, Finland	
High jump	1.00 m	Yalda Amini	27 April 2017	Tarmon kevätottelut	Helsinki, Finland	
Pole vault						
Long jump	3.59 m	Mehrangiz Bijanpoor	9 April 2005		Oslo, Norway	
Triple jump	7.13 m	Yalda Amini	9 April 2017	11th Helsinki Tetradecathlon	Helsinki, Finland	
Shot put	6.03 m (Note: outdoor mark ratified as absolute record)	Shakiba Fazeli	3 February 2012		Mashad, Iran	
Pentathlon	954 pts	Yalda Amini	27 April 2017	Tarmon kevätottelut	Helsinki, Finland	
Pentathlon	60m H / High jump / Shot put / Long jump / 800m; 13.58 / 1.00 m / 5.12 m / 3.28 m / 3:13.60					
3000 m walk	23:20.47	Parima Ahmadi	25 September 2005	Women's Islamic Games	Tehran, Iran	
4 × 400 m relay	4:53.96 (Note: superior indoor best not ratified by federation as outright records)	Afghanistan	15 February 2013		Tehran, Iran	
