= Mohammad Khan (athlete) =

Afghan athlete

- Khan in 1936

Personal information
- Full name: Mohammad Mohammad Khan
- Born: 1 May 1911

Sport
- Sport: Athletics, field hockey

Mohammad Mohammad Khan (Arabic: محمد محمد خان; born 1 May 1911, date of death unknown) was an Afghan athlete and general. During his sporting career, he was selected to compete for Afghanistan at the 1936 Summer Olympics, their debut. He competed in the men's 100 metres and men's long jump but did not advance past the preliminary rounds. After his sporting career, he served in the Ministry of Defense as a general.

== Biography ==
Mohammad Mohammad Khan was born on 1 May 1911. During Khan's career as an athlete, he was selected to be part of the first Afghan team at the Olympic Games, which made their debut at the 1936 Summer Olympics held in Berlin, Germany. He was initially announced to compete for the team individually as a long jumper and triple jumper.

For the 1936 Summer Games, he was entered as part of the Afghanistan men's national field hockey team and individually in the men's 100 metres and men's long jump. He first competed in the men's 100 metres on 2 August in the third heat against five other sprinters. There, he placed last and did not advance further. Two days later, he competed in the men's long jump qualifying round against 42 other competitors. He did not recorded a long enough mark and thus did not advance to the finals of the event. The men's hockey competition started on the same day though he did not compete in any matches for the team and was thus recorded as a non-starter.

After the 1936 Summer Games, he later became a 4-star general and served in the Ministry of Defense under King Mohammad Zahir Shah from 1960 to 1971.
