= Afghanistan at the 1980 Summer Olympics =

- IOC code: AFG
- NOC: Afghanistan National Olympic Committee

in Moscow
- Competitors: 11 in 2 sports
- Flag bearer: Ibrahim Shudzandin
- Medals: Gold 0 Silver 0 Bronze 0 Total 0

Summer Olympics appearances (overview)
- 1936; 1948; 1952; 1956; 1960; 1964; 1968; 1972; 1976; 1980; 1984; 1988; 1992; 1996; 2000; 2004; 2008; 2012; 2016; 2020; 2024

While many nations boycotted the 1980 Summer Olympics in Moscow because of the 1979 Soviet invasion of Afghanistan, the Soviet-controlled government of Afghanistan sent a team to Moscow. Afghanistan had previously boycotted the 1976 Summer Olympics in Montreal.

== Boxing ==
Athlete	Event	Round 1	Round 2	Round 3	Round 4	Round 5	Final / BM	
Athlete	Event	Opposition Result	Opposition Result	Opposition Result	Opposition Result	Opposition Result	Opposition Result	Rank
Ahmad Nesar	−54 kg	Bye	Mohamed (ETH); L PTS	did not advance				17
Esmail Mohammad	−57 kg	Bye	Fink (GDR); L KO1	did not advance				17
Rabani Ghulam	−60 kg	Jo-Ung (PRK); L TKO2	did not advance					17

== Wrestling ==
Men's freestyle

Athlete	Event	Round 1	Round 2	Round 3	Round 4	Round 5	Final / BM	
Athlete	Event	Opposition Result	Opposition Result	Opposition Result	Opposition Result	Opposition Result	Opposition Result	Rank
Mohammad Aktar	−48 kg	Jabbar (IRQ); W Fall	Falandys (POL); L 0-4	Se-Hong (PRK); L 0-4	did not advance			9
Mohammad Aynutdin	−52 kg	Efremov (YUG); L Fall	Thieng (VIE); W Fall	Dok-Ryong (PRK); L 1-3	did not advance			9
Mohammad Halilula	−57 kg	Hurtado (PER); L 1-3	Neagu (ROM); L Forfeit	did not advance				12
Khojawahid Zahedi	−74 kg	Fawaz (SYR); W Fall	Steingräber (GDR); L Fall	Withdrew				11
Ahmadjan Khasan	−82 kg	Mazur (POL); L DQ	Withdrew					14
Ibrahim Shudzandin	−90 kg	Tserentogtokh (MGL); L DQ	Diop (SEN); L Fall	did not advance				11

Men's Greco-Roman

Athlete	Event	Round 1	Round 2	Round 3	Round 4	Round 5	Final / BM	
Athlete	Event	Opposition Result	Opposition Result	Opposition Result	Opposition Result	Opposition Result	Opposition Result	Rank
Ghulam Sanay	−62 kg	Tóth (HUN); L Fall	Mygiakis (GRE); L DQ	did not advance				11
Sakhidad Hamidi	−68 kg	Supron (POL); L DQ	Bold (MGL); L DQ	did not advance				13
