= Afghanistan at the 1968 Summer Olympics =

- IOC code: AFG
- NOC: Afghanistan National Olympic Committee

in Mexico City, Mexico 12 – 27 October 1968
- Competitors: 5 in 1 sport
- Medals: Gold 0 Silver 0 Bronze 0 Total 0

Summer Olympics appearances (overview)
- 1936; 1948; 1952; 1956; 1960; 1964; 1968; 1972; 1976; 1980; 1984; 1988; 1992; 1996; 2000; 2004; 2008; 2012; 2016; 2020; 2024

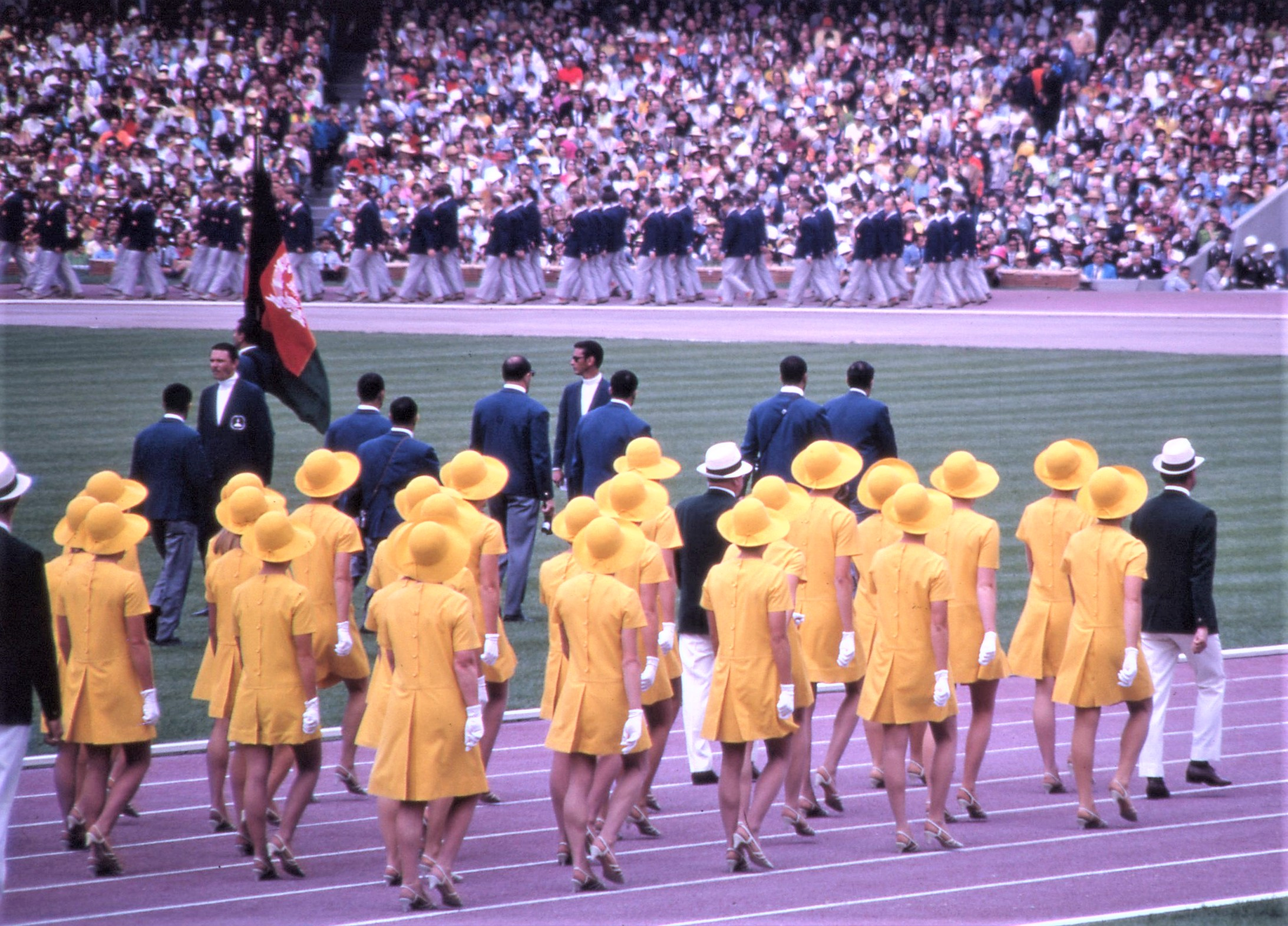
The Afghan delegation during the opening ceremony, in the background behind the marching West German delegation. Estadio Olímpico Universitario, 12 October 1968.

Afghanistan competed at the 1968 Summer Olympics in Mexico City.

They fielded five competitors, all wrestlers, and all men.

== Competitors ==
The following is the list of number of competitors in the Games.

Sport	Men	Women	Total
Wrestling	5	0	5
Total	5	0	5

== Wrestling ==
Men's freestyle

Athlete	Event	Round 1	Round 2	Round 3	Round 4	Round 5	Final / BM	
Athlete	Event	Opposition Result	Opposition Result	Opposition Result	Opposition Result	Opposition Result	Opposition Result	Rank
Ahmad Djan	−57 kg	Sükhbaatar (MGL); L 1-3	Talebi (IRI); L 1-3	did not advance				15
Mohammad Ebrahimi	−63 kg	Tedeyev (URS); L 1-3	Natsagdori (MGL); D Draw	did not advance				14
Aka-Jahan Dastagir	−70 kg	Pająk (POL); L Fall	Buzás (HUN); DQ	did not advance				21
Kayum Ayub	−78 kg	Momeni (IRI); L 0.5-3.5	Heinze (GDR); L DQ	did not advance				17
Ghulam Dastagir	−87 kg	Graffigna (ARG); L 1-3	Gardzhev (BUL); L Fall	did not advance				19
