= Boris Berian =

American middle-distance runner

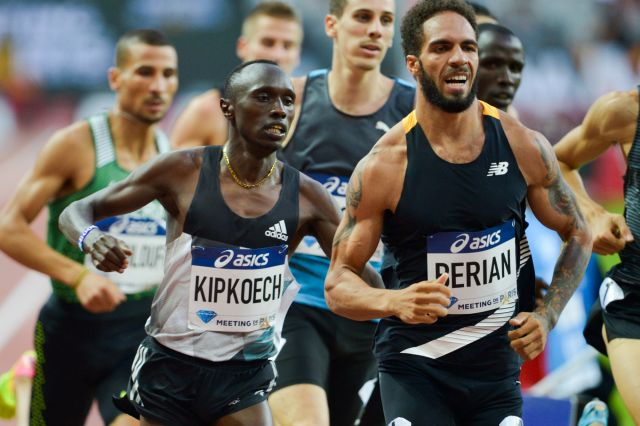
- Berian (right) at the 2016 Meeting de Paris

Personal information
- Nationality: American
- Born: December 19, 1992 (age 33) Colorado Springs, Colorado, U.S.
- Height: 6 ft 0 in (183 cm)
- Weight: 157 lb (71 kg)

Sport
- Sport: Track and Field
- Event: Middle distance
- College team: Adams State University

Achievements and titles
- Personal bests: 400 meters: 46.93; 800 meters: 1:43.34
Medal record
World Indoor Championships
Gold medal – first place	2016 Portland	800 m
- Updated on August 14, 2016

Boris Berian (born December 19, 1992) is an American middle distance runner. He was the 2016 National Champion and represented the United States at the 2016 IAAF World Indoor Championships in the 800 meters where he won the gold medal. He set his indoor best of 1:45.87 in winning the world title, and set his outdoor personal best of 1:43.34 at the 2015 Herculis meet. In his collegiate career, Berian ran for Adams State University, where he was coached by Damon Martin.

== Running career ==
=== High school ===
Berian, a Colorado Springs native, attended Widefield High School, where he graduated in 2011. During high school, he ran all the sprinting events, and also occasionally ran the 800 meters. Berian was the Colorado state champion two years a row at 400 meters and recorded high school personal bests of 46.9 for 400 meters and 1:52 for 800 meters.

". . . the kid had run a 46.9 400 in high school. That’s pretty much professional. I liked his speed, because you have to be born with speed. We can develop strength. Boris was born at altitude, 6,100 feet, and went to school at Adams State which is at 7,500 feet, Big Bear is at 6,700 feet. He’s lived his whole life at altitude. I saw this as a huge positive. No other 800 runner in this country lives and trains at altitude. People think altitude makes you slow, but 99.9% of the World and Olympic champions live and train at altitude. It gives you an advantage like the East Africans."

— Carlos Handler

=== Collegiate ===
While running at Adams State, he won both the 2012 NCAA Men's Division II Indoor Track and Field Championships and NCAA Men's Division II Outdoor Track and Field Championships at 800 meters. His wins helped Adams State to the outdoor team title and to second place indoors. Adams State coach Joe Vigil recommended Berian to the Big Bear Track Club, a small club formed by Carlos Handler around his wife, Brenda Martinez. Over the following year he improved to become the fifth-fastest American over 800 metres.

=== Professional ===
Berian experienced a breakout year in 2016. After winning the US Indoor Championship over 800 m, he went on to win the World Indoor Championship over the same distance. During the outdoor season, Berian won the 800 m at the Prefontaine Classic before finishing runner-up to Clayton Murphy at the US Olympic Trials. He then reached the final of the 800 m at the Rio Olympic Games where he finished in last place.

== Nike contract dispute ==
In early 2016, Berian received an offer sheet from New Balance with terms he found agreeable. Berian's contract with Nike had expired on December 31, 2015, but Nike retained the right to match a competitor's term sheet for 180 days. Nike indicated that they would match the New Balance offer and then sued him for breach of contract when he wouldn't sign with Nike. Berian argued that Nike failed to match the New Balance offer; both Nike and New Balance offered him $125,000 per year for three years, but the Nike offer included large reductions if Berian failed to meet expectations, while the New Balance offer contained no such reductions. Nike claimed they were prepared to fully match the New Balance contract but Berian's agent, Merhawi Keflezighi, did not communicate its terms to them adequately. In early June 2016, Portland district judge Marco Hernandez approved Nike's request to temporarily prohibit Berian from competing in New Balance gear. Nike's claims that reductions were an industry standard were contradicted by several of its rivals, including Oiselle, Brooks and New Balance. Hernandez was expected to make his next ruling on the matter after a hearing on June 21, but decided to delay it for a week; he did not extend the injunction against Berian competing in New Balance gear, which expired, and his comments in court indicated he felt that Nike had failed to match the New Balance offer. Nike, which had received negative publicity as a result of the controversy, dropped the lawsuit at that point.
