= Shahzada Saadat-ul-Mulk =

Afghan field hockey player

Shahzada Saadat-ul-Mulk (Urdu: شہزادہ سعادت الملک) (born 26 August 1916, date of death unknown) was an Afghan field hockey player, who competed at the 1936 Summer Olympic Games and played in both games. He reportedly later lived in Washington, D.C., with a wife and child and worked in the World Bank, dying at a fairly young age. He was a grandfather of Canadian food writer Shayma Saadat, author of the Spice Spoon culinary blog.
