= Mehboba Ahdyar =

Afghan athlete and runner

Personal information
- Born: 1989 (age 35–36) Kabul, Afghanistan

Sport
- Country: Afghanistan

Mehboba Ahdyar (born 1989 in Kabul) is an Afghan athlete. She was scheduled to be the only woman representing Afghanistan at the 2008 Summer Olympics in Beijing, where she planned to compete in athletics in the women's 1,500 metres and 3,000 metres events.

Her family live in a mud brick house in one of the poorest parts of Kabul. She reportedly runs 1,500 metres in about 4:50. Ahdyar had won competitions in Afghanistan, but the Olympics was going to be her first competition outside her home country. However, she did not compete because before the Olympics, on June 4, 2008, Ahdyar disappeared from a training facility in Formia, Italy, possibly to seek asylum. Her whereabouts were then unknown. On July 10, 2008, it became known that she was on her way to Norway to seek asylum.

The Afghan embassy in the United States reported that, as she trained for the Olympics, Ahdyar faced "daily taunts from her conservative neighbors, vicious rumors about her character, and even death threats from extremists."

Ahdyar planned on wearing a hijab during the competition, "I will not take off my scarf in China when I race because it is symbol of Muslim women."

== See also ==
- Robina Muqimyar, the first woman to run for Afghanistan at the Olympics, in 2004
