= Basharmal Sultani =

Afghan boxer (born 1985)

Basharmal Sultani (born January 28, 1985) is an Afghan Olympic athlete, who competed in boxing in the 2004 Summer Olympics in Athens, Greece. He was invited to participate by the International Olympic Committee. He lost his first round bout in the welterweight category to Mohamed Hikal of Egypt on points, 40–12.

== See also ==
- Hamid Rahimi
- Sport in Afghanistan
