= Afghanistan at the 1948 Summer Olympics =

- IOC code: AFG
- NOC: Afghanistan National Olympic Committee

in London
- Competitors: 31 in 2 sports
- Medals: Gold 0 Silver 0 Bronze 0 Total 0

Summer Olympics appearances (overview)
- 1936; 1948; 1952; 1956; 1960; 1964; 1968; 1972; 1976; 1980; 1984; 1988; 1992; 1996; 2000; 2004; 2008; 2012; 2016; 2020; 2024; 2028

Afghanistan competed at the 1948 Summer Olympics in London, sending a total of 31 competitors, which consisted of the men's field hockey and football teams. This is the highest number of athletes that Afghanistan has ever sent to a Summer Olympic Games.

Afghanistan's football tournament began on 26 July at Brighton's Goldstone Ground with a preliminary round match against Luxembourg, with Afghanistan losing 0–6. This resulted in Afghanistan's failure to qualify to the first round of the tournament.

Out of three group stage matches, Afghanistan's field hockey team won 1 match, drew 1 match and lost 1 match, resulting in placing third of four competing teams, with a sum of 3 points. Afghanistan began their first of three group stage matches on 3 August, which ended in a 2–0 win for the country. However, in their final group match, Afghanistan faced Great Britain, who were playing on home ground, Afghanistan lost by 8 goals, scoring no goals themselves. Afghanistan then finished its second match on 5 August, against Switzerland, which ended as a draw (1 goal to each team). Therefore, Afghanistan did not proceed to the semi-finals, finishing third in Group B.

== Field hockey ==
Men's tournament

Manager: Shahzada Muhammad Yusuf

Pos.	Player	DoB	Age	Caps	Club	Tournament games	Tournament goals
	Mohammad Attai			?		3	?
	G.Jagi			?		2	?
	Mohammad Khogaini			?		3	?
	Bakhteyar Gulam Mangal	1928		?		3	1
	Ahmed Jahan Nuristani			?		3	?
	Abdul Kadir Nuristani	1925		?		3	?
	Din Mohammad Nuristani	1928		?		3	?
	Jahan Gulam Nuristani	1925		?		2	?
	Mohammad Amin Nuristani	1928		?		2	?
	Mohammad Jahan Nuristani			?		1	?
	Mohammad Kadir Nuristani	1925		?		3	?
	Ahmad Tajik			?		1
	Khan Nasrullah Totakhail	1925		?		3	?
	Ahmad Yusufzai			?		1	?

=== Group B ===
Rank	Team	Pld	W	D	L	GF	GA	Pts	(United Kingdom)	(Switzerland)	(Afghanistan)	(United States)
1.	Great Britain	3	2	1	0	19	0	5	X	0:0	8:0	11:0
2.	Switzerland	3	1	2	0	4	2	4	0:0	X	1:1	3:1
3.	Afghanistan	3	1	1	1	3	9	3	0:8	1:1	X	2:0
4.	United States	3	0	0	3	1	16	0	0:11	1:3	0:2	X

== Football ==
=== Squad ===
Head coach: ?

Pos.	Player	DoB	Age	Caps	Club	Tournament games	Tournament goals	Minutes played	Sub off	Sub on	Cards yellow/red
GK	Abdul Ghafoor Assar			?	(Afghanistan) Mahmoudiyeh F.C.	1	0	90	-	-	-
DF	Mohamed Ibrahim Gharzai			?		1	0	90	-	-	-
DF	Mohammad Sarwar Yousafzai			?		1	0	90	-	-	-
MF	Abdul Shacour Azimi	1923		?		1	0	90	-	-	-
MF	Yar Mohammed Barakzai	1923		?		1	0	90	-	-	-
MF	Abdul Ahad Kharot	1926		?	(Afghanistan) Mahmoudiyeh F.C.	1	0	90	-	-	-
FW	Mohammad Anwar Afzal	1926		?		1	0	90	-	-	-
FW	Abdul Ghani Assar	1923		?	(Afghanistan) Mahmoudiyeh F.C.	1	0	90	-	-	-
FW	Mohamed Anwar Kharot			?		1	0	90	-	-	-
FW	Abdul Hamid Tajik	1923		?		1	0	90	-	-	-
FW	Abdul Ghafoor Yusufzai			?		1	0	90	-	-	-
	Stand-by players -
	A.W.Aitimadi			?	(Afghanistan) Mahmoudiyeh F.C.	0	0	0	-	-	-
	M.M.Azami			?		0	0	0	-	-	-
	A.S.Mohamedzai			?		0	0	0	-	-	-
	M.U.Sadat			?		0	0	0	-	-	-
	M.I.Tokhi			?		0	0	0	-	-	-

=== Match ===
26 July 1948
18:00

Luxembourg	6–0	Afghanistan
Gales; Schammel; Kettel; Paulus	Report

Goldstone Ground, Brighton
Attendance: 5.000
Referee: A.C. Williams (GBR)

== Notes and references ==
- "AFG Summer 1948 Hockey/Football squad lists". Archived from the original on 17 April 2020.
- "Football at the 1948 London Summer Games". Sports Reference. Archived from the original on 17 April 2020.

== See also ==
- Afghanistan at the Olympics
- Sport in Afghanistan
