= Ibrahim Shudzandin =

Afghan wrestler (born 1950)

Ibrahim Shudzandin (born 27 August 1950) is a former Afghanistan wrestler, who competed at the 1980 Summer Olympics in the light-heavyweight event.
