= 2016 IAAF World Indoor Championships – Men's 800 metres =

Men's 800 metres at the 2016 IAAF World Indoor Championships
- Venue: Oregon Convention Center
- Dates: March 18 (heats); March 19 (final)
- Competitors: 15 from 12 nations
- Winning time: 1:45.83

Medalists
gold medal	Boris Berian	United States
silver medal	Antoine Gakeme	Burundi
bronze medal	Erik Sowinski	United States

Video on YouTube Official Video

The men's 800 metres at the 2016 IAAF World Indoor Championships took place on March 18 and 19, 2016.

In the final, Boris Berian went out fast 23.92 for the first lap and 49.73, on the indoor level that is equivalent with taking the race into the Gray zone. The rest of the field chose not to go with him, giving up seven meters by the half way point, expecting to pick up the pieces when Berian slowed. At the end of the third lap, he had maintained the gap but looked tired. Through the next 100 metres Antoine Gakeme and Musaeb Abdulrahman Balla closed down the gap to three metres. Balla stumbled and lost ground. Through the final turn Gakeme couldn't gain any further and on the final straightaway Berian pulled away for a clear 5 metre victory. As Balla regained his form, Erik Sowinski pulled onto his shoulder and executed a perfect pass to take the bronze.

== Results ==
=== Heats ===
Qualification: The winner of each heat (Q) and next 3 fastest (q) qualified for the final.

Rank	Heat	Name	Nationality	Time	Notes
1	3	Musaeb Abdulrahman Balla	Qatar	1:47.61	Q
2	3	Mohammed Aman	Ethiopia	1:48.02	q
3	2	Antoine Gakeme	Burundi	1:48.09	Q SB
4	3	Erik Sowinski	United States	1:48.11	q
5	2	Boris Berian	United States	1:48.55	q
6	2	Jeremiah Kipkorir Mutai	Kenya	1:48.70	
7	2	Andreas Kramer	Sweden	1:49.46	
8	2	Daniel Andújar	Spain	1:49.49	
9	3	Theofanis Michaelas	Cyprus	1:51.36	
10	1	Mostafa Smaili	Morocco	1:52.16	Q
11	3	Brice Etes	Monaco	1:52.23	SB
12	1	Edward Kibet Kemboi	Kenya	1:52.39	
13	1	Álvaro de Arriba	Spain	1:52.60	
14	1	Pol Moya	Andorra	1:54.19	
15	1	Wais Ibrahim Khairandesh	Afghanistan	1:57.36	NR

=== Final ===
The race was started on March 19 at 18:35.

Rank	Name	Nationality	Time	Notes
1st place, gold medalist(s)	Boris Berian	United States	1:45.83	SB
2nd place, silver medalist(s)	Antoine Gakeme	Burundi	1:46.65	SB
3rd place, bronze medalist(s)	Erik Sowinski	United States	1:47.22	
4	Mohammed Aman	Ethiopia	1:47.97	
5	Musaeb Abdulrahman Balla	Qatar	1:48.31	
6	Mostafa Smaili	Morocco	1:52.32	
