= Afghanistan at the 1996 Summer Olympics =

- IOC code: AFG
- NOC: Afghanistan National Olympic Committee

in Atlanta
- Competitors: 3 in 2 sports
- Flag bearer: Mohammad Aman
- Medals: Gold 0 Silver 0 Bronze 0 Total 0

Summer Olympics appearances (overview)
- 1936; 1948; 1952; 1956; 1960; 1964; 1968; 1972; 1976; 1980; 1984; 1988; 1992; 1996; 2000; 2004; 2008; 2012; 2016; 2020; 2024

Afghanistan was represented at the 1996 Summer Olympics in Atlanta, Georgia, United States by the Afghanistan National Olympic Committee.

In total, three athletes from Afghanistan went to the Games to compete in two sports including athletics and boxing. However, only two would compete after Mohammad Jawid Aman was disqualified for being too late for the weigh-in.

== Competitors ==
In total, three athletes were due to represent Afghanistan at the 1996 Summer Olympics in Atlanta, Georgia, United States across two different sports.

Sport	Men	Women	Total
Athletic	2	0	2
Boxing	1	0	1 (Note: Mohammad Jawid Aman was disqualified after arriving late and missing the weigh-in.)
Total	3	0	3

== Athletics ==
In total, two Afghan athletes participated in the athletic events – Abdul Ghafoor in the men's 100 m and Abdul Baser Wasiqi in the men's marathon.

The heats for the men's 100 m took place on 26 July 1996 at the Centennial Olympic Stadium. Ghafoor contested heat two which took place at 11:05 am. He finished eighth of the eight starters in a time of 12.2 seconds and failed to advance to the semi-finals.

The men's marathon took place on 4 August 1996 at 7:05 am. The course began and ended at the Centennial Olympic Stadium and followed the general route of the Atlanta Marathon. Wasiqi had been forced to stop training shortly after arriving in Atlanta due to a hamstring injury. He was still able to compete in the event and limped most of the course. He finished the race in a time of four hours 24 minutes and 17 seconds to finish 111th overall – one hour and 24 minutes behind every other finisher. When he arrived back, Wasiqi was aplauded across the finishing line by volunteers who had been preparing the stadium for the closing ceremony.

Athletes	Events	Heat Round 1		Heat Round 2		Semifinal		Final	
Athletes	Events	Time	Rank	Time	Rank	Time	Rank	Time	Rank
Abdul Ghafoor	100 metres	12.20	105	did not advance					
Abdul Baser Wasiqi	Marathon							4:24:17	111

== Boxing ==
Mohammad Jawid Aman was due to compete in the light middleweight category. However, he was refused participation after arriving too late in Atlanta to make the mandatory weigh-in.

== Aftermath ==
Afghanistan's participation at the 1996 Summer Olympics was described as a "hard luck story" by Reuters after Aman wasn't allowed to compete and Wasiqi's injury hampered his marathon. Wasiqi's performance, the slowest time to complete an Olympic marathon, is considered to represent the Olympic spirit.

Afghanistan did not compete at the 2000 Summer Olympics after Abdul Shukoor Mutmaen, head of the Olympic committee run by the Taliban (who controlled most of the country at the time), rejected an offer from the International Olympic Committee to allow Afghan athletes to compete under a neutral flag.

== See also ==
- Afghanistan at the 1996 Summer Paralympics
