= Mian Faruq Shah =

Afghan field hockey player (1907–2012)

Mian Farooq Shah (born in Nowshera, Pakistan, June 1907 – May 2013) was an Afghan field hockey player who competed at the 1936 Summer Olympic Games in Berlin, playing in one game. He served as sports minister of Afghanistan (1935–1936). Farooq studied agriculture at the University of Reading in London, England. In August 1931, he became the first man of the North-West Frontier Province to gain a British pilot's license. Shah later changed his Indian citizenship to Afghan, but moved back to Pakistan after it gained its independence in 1947, where he lived on Shahpur Farm near Peshawar. He had seven children and multiple grandchildren. He died on 1 May 2013.
