= Farzad Mansouri =

Afghan taekwondo practitioner

Personal information
- Nationality: Afghan
- Born: 19 March 2002 (age 23) Parwan, Afghanistan
- Height: 196 cm (6 ft 5 in)
- Weight: 80 kg (176 lb)

Sport
- Country: Afghanistan; Refugee Olympic Team
- Sport: Taekwondo

Farzad Mansouri (born 19 March 2002) is an Afghan taekwondo practitioner. At the 2020 Summer Olympics, Mansouri and Kamia Yousufi carried Afghanistan's flag at the Opening Ceremony.

== Early life ==
Mansouri was born in Parwan, Afghanistan on 19 March 2002.

== Career ==
Farzad Mansouri won a silver medal at the 2019 Asian Junior Taekwondo Championships in Amman. In 2021, Mansouri won a bronze medal in the 74 kg weight category at the 2021 Beirut Open Taekwondo Tournament.

Mansouri competed at the 2020 Olympics in the men's +80 kg event. He received a scholarship from the IOC as part of its Olympic Solidarity programme.

In March 2025, he won a gold medal at the English Open Taekwondo under the refugee flag in Manchester. In the final, he beat a Puerto Rican rival, to clinch the title.

== Fleeing Kabul ==
After the Fall of Kabul in 2021, he left the city. After he was the flag bearer at the 2020 Olympics, one of his brothers in London warned him not to go back to Afghanistan. But he went back and within two weeks things became worse. He scrambled at the Afghanistan's Kabul airport and got into an evacuation flight to flee after the Taliban takeover. Along with the five members of his family (his father, mother, brother, sister and a niece), he fled and later lived in a refugee camp for five months before he went to UK alone. A day after he arrived at the refugee camp in United Arab Emirates, 170 civilians and 13 US soldiers were killed at Kabul airport. Among them was his friend and taekwondo team-mate Mohammed Jan Sultani, who also died in the suicide bomb attack at Kabul.

Mansouri eventually settled in the United Kingdom, training with GB Taekwondo, where he was selected to be part of the Refugee Olympic Team for the 2024 Summer Olympics.

== See also ==
- Afghanistan at the 2020 Summer Olympics
- List of flag bearers for Afghanistan at the Olympics
- Refugee Olympic Team at the 2024 Summer Olympics

Olympic Games
Preceded by Mohammad Tawfiq Bakhshi	Flagbearer for Afghanistan; Tokyo 2020	Succeeded by Incumbent
