= Afghanistan at the 2008 Summer Olympics =

- IOC code: AFG
- NOC: Afghanistan National Olympic Committee

in Beijing
- Competitors: 4 in 2 sports
- Flag bearer: Nesar Ahmad Bahave
- Medals Ranked 80th: Gold 0 Silver 0 Bronze 1 Total 1

Summer Olympics appearances (overview)
- 1936; 1948; 1952; 1956; 1960; 1964; 1968; 1972; 1976; 1980; 1984; 1988; 1992; 1996; 2000; 2004; 2008; 2012; 2016; 2020; 2024; 2028

Afghanistan sent a team to compete at the 2008 Summer Olympics in Beijing, China. The team consisted of three men and one woman. Initially, Mehboba Ahdyar prepared to run the 800 metres and 1500 metres, but left her training camp on June 4 to seek political asylum in Norway. The country was represented by two competitors in athletics, and two in taekwondo. Afghanistan won its first ever Olympic medal at these games, with Rohullah Nikpai taking bronze in men's 58 kg taekwondo.

== Medalists ==
Medal	Name	Sport	Event
Bronze	Rohullah Nikpai	Taekwondo	Men's 58 kg

== Athletics ==
Competitors in athletics events could qualify for the next round of competition in two ways. Qualifying by right involved ranking high enough in their heat, and qualifying by result meant ranking high enough in overall standings. Ranks shown are therefore those within each heat, not in overall standings.

Key

- Note–Ranks given for track events are within the athlete's heat only
- Q = Qualified for the next round
- q = Qualified for the next round as a fastest loser or, in field events, by position without achieving the qualifying target
- NR = National record
- N/A = Round not applicable for the event
- Bye = Athlete not required to compete in round

Men

Athlete	Event	Heat		Quarterfinal		Semifinal		Final	
Athlete	Event	Result	Rank	Result	Rank	Result	Rank	Result	Rank
Massoud Azizi	100 m	11.45	8	Did not advance					

Women

Athlete	Event	Heat		Quarterfinal		Semifinal		Final	
Athlete	Event	Result	Rank	Result	Rank	Result	Rank	Result	Rank
Robina Muqimyar	100 m	14.80	8	Did not advance					

== Taekwondo ==
Athlete	Event	Round of 16	Quarterfinals	Semifinals	Repechage	Bronze Medal	Final	
Athlete	Event	Opposition Result	Opposition Result	Opposition Result	Opposition Result	Opposition Result	Opposition Result	Rank
Rohullah Nikpai	Men's −58 kg	Tuncat (GER); W 4–3	Pérez (MEX); L 1–2	Did not advance	Harvey (GBR); W 2–1	Ramos (ESP); W 4–1	Did not advance	3rd place, bronze medalist(s)
Nesar Ahmad Bahave	Men's −68 kg	M López (USA); L 0–3	Did not advance		Manz (GER); L 3–4	Did not advance		
