= Chār Qala =

Chār Qala چهار قلعه
- Neighborhood of Kabul
- Country: Afghanistan
- Province: Kabul

Chār Qala (Dari: چهار قلعه, meaning Four Castles), also known as Char Qala-e Wazirabad, is a neighbourhood in northern Kabul, Afghanistan, forming part of the city's Police District 10. Chār Qala is a densely populated slum area located to the north of the wealthy Wazir Akbar Khan.

== See also ==
- Kabul
