= Tahmina Kohistani =

Afghan sprinter

Tahmina Kohistani (Dari: تهمینه کوهستانی; born 8 June 1989, Kapisa Province) is an Afghan runner at 100 metres.

Kohistani competed at the 2012 Summer Olympics in London, making a new personal best of 14.42 seconds in the heats of the 100 metres distance. She did not advance to the first round. Her previous personal best at the 100 metres was 15.00 at a competition in Bydgoszcz, Poland in 2008. In 2015, she was listed as one of BBC's 100 Women.
