= Afghanistan at the 1956 Summer Olympics =

- IOC code: AFG
- NOC: Afghanistan National Olympic Committee

in Melbourne/Stockholm
- Medals: Gold 0 Silver 0 Bronze 0 Total 0

Summer Olympics appearances (overview)
- 1936; 1948; 1952; 1956; 1960; 1964; 1968; 1972; 1976; 1980; 1984; 1988; 1992; 1996; 2000; 2004; 2008; 2012; 2016; 2020; 2024

Afghanistan competed at the 1956 Summer Olympics in Melbourne after missing the 1952 Games in Helsinki. The country sent a team of 12 players to compete in field hockey. Six of these players had also competed at the 1948 Summer Olympics.

== Field Hockey ==
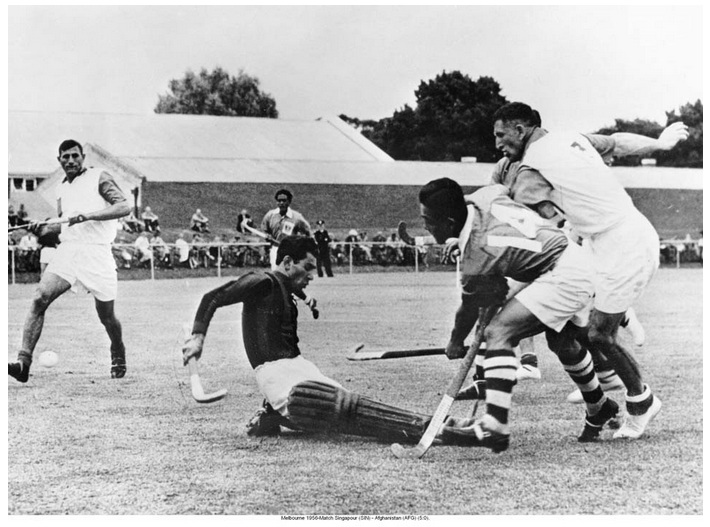
Afghanistan v Singapore

=== Squad ===
Head coach:

No.	Pos.	Player	DoB	Age	Caps	Club	Tournament games	Tournament goals
		Ahmad Shah Abouwi			?		3	0
		Noor Ullah Nuristani			?		3	0
		Ramazan Nuristani			?		2	0
		Bakhteyar Gulam Mangal			?		3	2
		Ghazi Salah-ud-Din			?		2	0
		Abdul Kadir Nuristani			?		3	0
		Din Mohammad Nuristani			?		3	0
		Jahan Gulam Nuristani			?		3	2
		Mohammad Amin Nuristani			?		2	0
		Mohammad Anis Sherzai			?		3	0
		Mohammad Yahya Najem			?		3	1
		Khan Nasrullah Totakhail			?		3	0

=== Group A ===
November 26, 14:30

India	14–0 (3–0)	Afghanistan

November 28, 11:30

Singapore	5–0 (4–0)	Afghanistan

November 30, 14:30

Afghanistan	5–1 (2–1)	United States

Group standings

Team	Pld	W	D	L	GF	GA	Pts
India	3	3	0	0	36	0	6
Singapore	3	2	0	1	11	7	4
Afghanistan	3	1	0	2	5	20	2
United States	3	0	0	3	2	27	0

- India advanced to the semi-finals.

== Notes and references ==
- The Official Report of the Organizing Committee for the Games of the XVI Olympiad Melbourne 1956 (PDF). Melbourne, Australia: W.M. Houston, Government Printer. 1958. pp. 500–511. Archived from the original (PDF) on 2008-09-12.
