= Afghanistan at the 1964 Summer Olympics =

- IOC code: AFG
- NOC: Afghanistan National Olympic Committee

in Tokyo
- Competitors: 8 in 1 sport
- Medals: Gold 0 Silver 0 Bronze 0 Total 0

Summer Olympics appearances (overview)
- 1936; 1948; 1952; 1956; 1960; 1964; 1968; 1972; 1976; 1980; 1984; 1988; 1992; 1996; 2000; 2004; 2008; 2012; 2016; 2020; 2024; 2028

Afghanistan competed at the 1964 Summer Olympics in Tokyo. The national delegation comprised eight competitors.

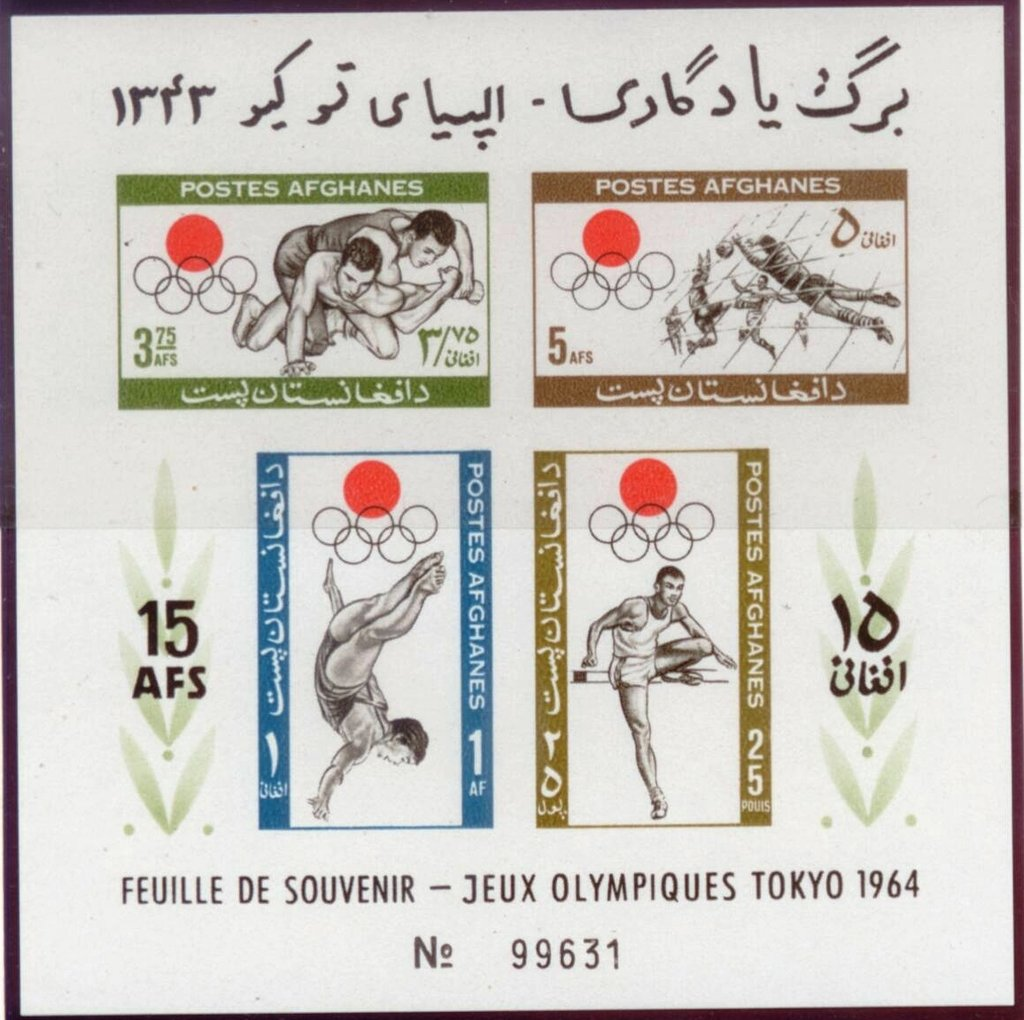
Afghan stamps for the 1964 Summer Olympics

== Wrestling ==
Men's freestyle

Athlete	Event	Round 1	Round 2	Round 3	Round 4	Round 5	Final / BM	
Athlete	Event	Opposition result	Opposition result	Opposition result	Opposition result	Opposition result	Opposition result	Rank
Faiz Mohammad Khakshar	−52 kg	Grassi (ITA); L 1-3	O'Connor (IRL); L Fall	did not advance				16
Mohammad Daoud Anwary	−57 kg	Akbaş (TUR); L 1-3	Khodabandeh (IRN); L 1-3	did not advance				14
Mohammad Ebrahimi	−62 kg	BYE	Romero (ARG); W Fall	Aspen (GBR); W 3-1	Ivanov (BUL); L 1-3	Douglas (USA); L 1-3	did not advance	5
Djan-Aka Djan	−67 kg	Vario (ARG); W 3-1	Dong-Gu (KOR); L 1-3	Rost (EUA); L 1-3	did not advance			11
Shakar Khan Shakar	−73 kg	Allen (GBR); D 2-2	Sagharadze (URS); L Fall	did not advance				16

Men's Greco-Roman

Athlete	Event	Round 1	Round 2	Round 3	Round 4	Round 5	Final / BM	
Athlete	Event	Opposition result	Opposition result	Opposition result	Opposition result	Opposition result	Opposition result	Rank
Nour Ullah Noor	−57 kg	Ichiguchi (JPN); L Fall	Fitch (USA); L 1-3	did not advance				15
Nour Aka Sayed	−62 kg	Martinović (YUG); L Fall	Bolocan (ROM); L Fall	did not advance				24
Wahid Ullah Zaid	−67 kg	Echaniz (MEX); D Draw	Madsen (DEN); L 1-3	Schmitt (EUA); L 0-4	did not advance			12
