= Abdul Baser Wasiqi =

Afghan athletics competitor

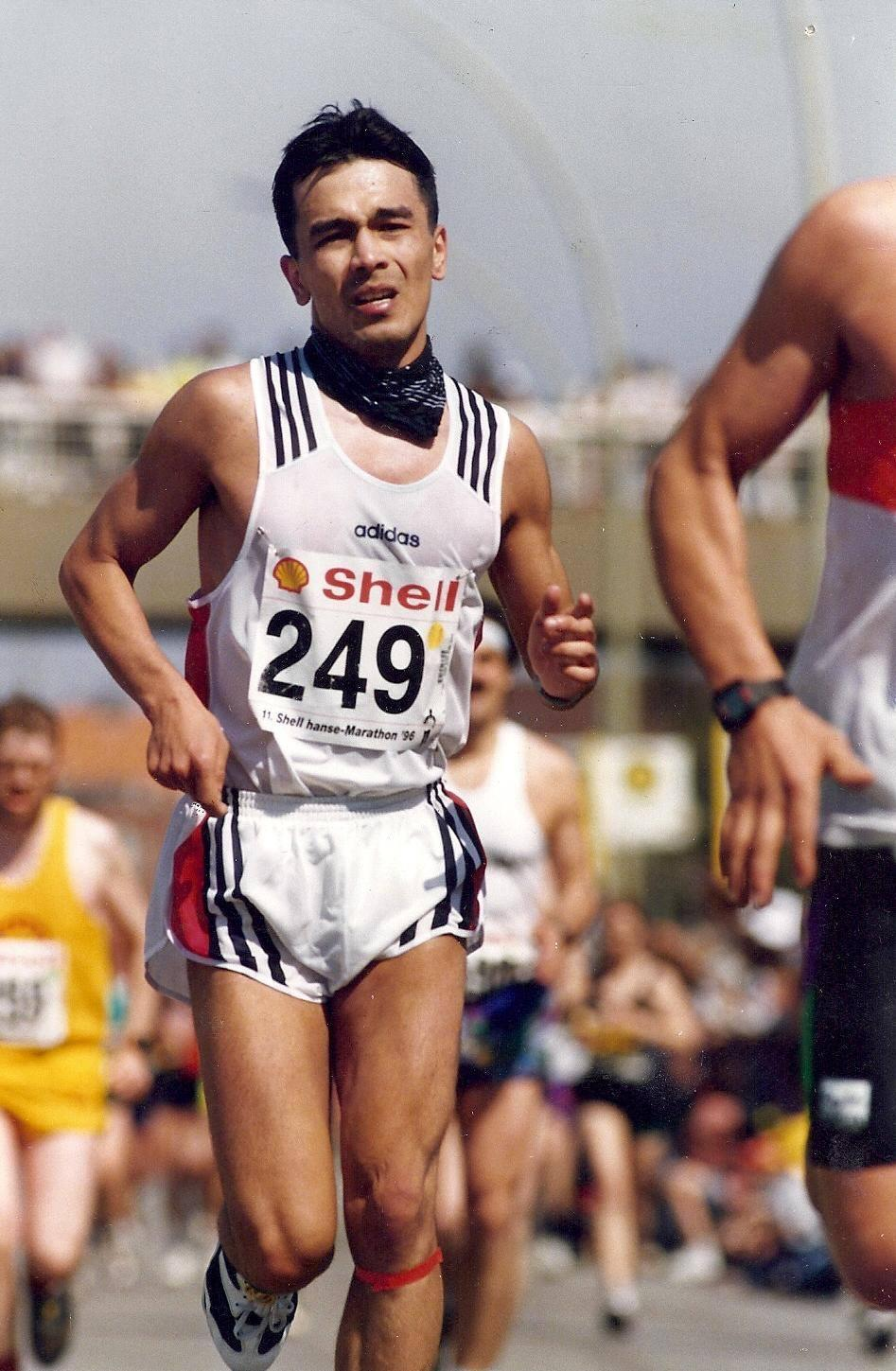
Abdul Baser Wasiqi participating in the 1996 Olympic Trials.

Abdul Baser Wasiqi (born 12 July 1975) is an Afghan athlete known for completing the marathon at the 1996 Summer Olympics despite suffering an injury before the event.

Wasiqi represented Afghanistan at the 1996 Summer Olympics in Atlanta. He injured his hamstring before the marathon, but took part nonetheless. He completed the race despite his injury, limping the whole way, with a time of 4:24:17, much slower than his personal best of two hours and thirty-three minutes. He finished 111th and last, nearly an hour and a half behind the second-slowest competitor. Wasiqi reached the stadium and found "workmen [...] preparing the arena for the closing ceremony" and "tarpaulin being laid across the running track". Preparations were suspended long enough for Wasiqi to reach the finish line.
