= Abdul Hadi Shekaib =

Afghan athlete

Abdul Hadi Shekaib (born 27 April 1940 in Kabul) is a former athlete from Afghanistan, who competed at the 1960 Summer Olympics in the Men's 100m and the Men's 4 × 100 m Relay, he failed to advance in either.
