= Afghanistan at the 1988 Summer Olympics =

- IOC code: AFG
- NOC: Afghanistan National Olympic Committee

in Seoul
- Competitors: 5 in 1 sport
- Medals: Gold 0 Silver 0 Bronze 0 Total 0

Summer Olympics appearances (overview)
- 1936; 1948; 1952; 1956; 1960; 1964; 1968; 1972; 1976; 1980; 1984; 1988; 1992; 1996; 2000; 2004; 2008; 2012; 2016; 2020; 2024

Afghanistan competed at the 1988 Summer Olympics with five committees in Seoul, after having boycotted the 1984 Summer Olympics in Los Angeles. In total, Afghanistan has completed in 14 Olympic games, none of which included Winter sports after making their initial appearance in 1936.

== Competitors ==
The following is the list of number of competitors in the Games.

| Sport | Men | Women | Total |
|---|---|---|---|
| Wrestling | 5 | – | 5 |
| Total | 5 | 0 | 5 |

== Wrestling ==
=== Men's freestyle ===
| Athlete | Event | Round 1 | Round 2 | Round 3 | Round 4 | Round 5 | Final / BM | |
| Athlete | Event | Opposition Result | Opposition Result | Opposition Result | Opposition Result | Opposition Result | Opposition Result | Rank |
|---|---|---|---|---|---|---|---|---|
| Mohammad Razigul | −48 kg | Gunawan (INA); W 3-1 | Karamchakov (URS); L 1-3 | Tsonov (BUL); L 1-3 | did not advance | | | |
| Ahmad Nasir | −52 kg | Tutsch (FRG); W 3-1 | Jong-O (KOR); L 1-3 | Sato (JPN); L Fall | did not advance | | | |
| Ali Dad | −62 kg | Skubacz (POL); L 1-3 | Oporta (PAN); W 3-0 | Lehto (FIN); L 0-3 | did not advance | | | |
| Mohammad Shir | −68 kg | Amaraa (MGL); L 0-4 | Carr (USA); L 0-4 | did not advance | | | | |
| Mohammad Taj | −90 kg | Türkkaya (TUR); L 1-3 | Guèye (SEN); W Fall | Deskoulidis (GRE); L Fall | did not advance | | | |
