= Said Gilani =

Afghan sprinter

Personal information
- Nationality: Afghan
- Born: 5 February 1996 (age 30)

Sport
- Sport: Athletics
- Event: Sprinting

Achievements and titles
- Personal best(s): 11.13s (100 m); 22.31s (200 m)

Said Gilani (Dari/Persian: سعید گیلانی; born 5 February 1996) is an Afghan athlete. He competed in the men's 100 metres event at the 2017, 2019 and 2023 World Athletics Championships. In 2019, he competed in the preliminary round and he did not advance to compete in the heats. In 2023 he gets injured during the race and do not finish his preliminary round.

He lives in Germany.
