= Mohammad Tawfiq Bakhshi =

Afghan judoka

Mohammad Tawfiq Bakhshi (born July 5, 1984 / March 11, 1986) is an Afghan judoka. He competed at the 2016 Summer Olympics in the men's 100 kg event, in which he was eliminated in the first round by Jorge Fonseca. He was also the flag bearer for Afghanistan at the 2016 Summer Olympics Parade of Nations.

Olympic Games
Preceded by Nesar Ahmad Bahave	Flagbearer for Afghanistan; 2016 Rio de Janeiro	Succeeded by Farzad Mansouri; Kamia Yousufi
