= Fariba Rezayee =

Afghan judoka

Friba Rezayee فریبا رضایی
Personal information
- Nationality: Afghanistan
- Born: Friba; September 3, 1985 (age 40) Kabul, Democratic Republic of Afghanistan
- Occupation: Judoka
- Relative: Shaima Rezayee

Sport
- Sport: Judo
- Weight class: Middle Weight

Profile at external databases
- JudoInside.com: 33817
- Updated on April 23, 2012

Fariba Rezayee (Dari: فریبا رضایی), (born September 3, 1985) is a Hazara judoka, who is perhaps best known as one of the first two women athletes from Afghanistan to compete in the Summer Olympics. The Taliban controlling most of Afghanistan had caused the country to be banned from the Olympics in 1999 due to discrimination against women under Taliban rule as well as its prohibition of sports of any kind, and thus missed out on the Sydney Olympics of the year 2000. In June 2003, the IOC lifted the suspension imposed on Afghanistan during the 115th IOC Session in Prague, and the country sent a delegation of five competitors to the Athens Games in 2004. Rezayee and Robina Muqimyar were two women contingents in the delegation, becoming the first ever women to compete for Afghanistan at the Olympics.

== Personal life ==
Rezayee was born to an ethnically Hazara family. Her family moved from Afghanistan to the neighbouring Pakistan when she was nine years old after the Taliban seized control in 1996. Rezayee, along with her family, lived in Pakistan for eight years as a refugee, and studied martial arts and boxing there.

After her return with her family to Afghanistan in 2002, she moved in boxing and was the first Afghan female boxer. But due to lack of other female boxers in her team, she then moved into judo, and began training for the Olympic Games at a girl's judo club sponsored by Danish Refugee Council. Fariba is the younger sister of Shaima Rezayee, a music TV presenter who was killed in 2005 in her hometown Kabul. She also has two older brothers, Javed and Fawad.

In 2011, Rezayee moved to Vancouver, Canada, as a refugee. She studied political science at the University of British Columbia. In a 2024 interview, she recalled, “When I first came to Canada, I got a bicycle and went to Stanley Park and rode very fast and I said, ‘Who says heaven doesn’t exist?’ I just wanted to have my freedom and be able to breathe and live. I'm very grateful to be in Canada. I don't take any second of my life here for granted."

== 2004 Athens Olympics ==
Rezayee represented Afghanistan in the middleweight class (70 kg) event of judo in the 2004 Summer Olympics, Athens. The whole competition took place on August 18. In her first-round match, Rezayee faced Spaniard Cecilia Blanco and lost the bout without earning a single point.

== See also ==
- Rohullah Nikpai
- Shaima Rezayee
