= Wais Ibrahim Khairandesh =

Afghan middle-distance runner

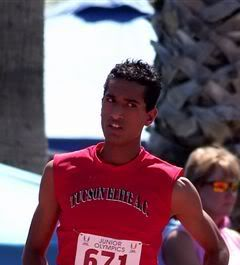
- 2007 Photo

Personal information
- Born: 31 December 1990 (age 35)

Sport
- Country: Afghanistan
- Sport: Track and field
- Event: 800 metres
- Updated on 29 August 2015

Wais Ibrahim Khairandesh (Persian: ویس ابراهیم خیراندیش; born 31 December 1990) is a male Afghan middle-distance runner. He currently holds the Afghanistan national record in the 800m with a time of 1:53.62, which he accomplished in Portland, Oregon, USA. He competed in the 800 metres event at the 2015 World Championships in Athletics in Beijing, China.

== Competition record ==
Year	Competition	Venue	Position	Event	Notes
Representing Afghanistan
2015	World Championships	Beijing, China	44th (h)	800 m	1:59.51
2016	World Indoor Championships	Portland, United States	15th (h)	800 m	1:57.36
2017	Asian Championships	Bhubaneswar, India	29th (h)	800 m	1:58.75
2017	Asian Championships	Bhubaneswar, India	10th (h)	4 × 400 m relay	3:20.77
