= Sha Mahmood Noor Zahi =

Afghan sprinter (born 1991)

Personal information
- Nationality: Afghanistan
- Born: 21 March 1991 (age 35)

Sport
- Country: (Islamic Republic of Afghanistan) IR Afghanistan
- Sport: Athletics
- Event: 100 m

Achievements and titles
- Personal best: 100 m: 10.64

Sha Mahmood Noor Zahi (21 March 1991) is an Afghan sprinter.

After getting an Olympic Scholarship, Noor Zahi was selected by World Athletics on an universality place to represent Afghanistan at the 2020 Summer Games in Tokyo. He ran in the men's 100 metres' preliminary round after staying in Omuta. Although Noor Zahi placed seventh in the preliminary round and thus did not advance, his time of 11.4 set a new national record.

Noor Zahi qualified for the 2024 Summer Olympics where he finished 4th in his Preliminary heat, one spot shy of advancing, and lowered his national record to 10.64.
