= Robina Muqimyar =

Afghan athlete and politician (born 1986)

Robina Muqimyar روبینا مقیم‌یار
Personal information
- Native name: Robina Jalali
- Nationality: Afghanistan
- Born: 3 July 1986 (age 40) Kabul, Afghanistan
- Occupations: Afghan athlete, Politician
- Height: 1.7 m (5 ft 7 in)
- Weight: 58 kg (128 lb)

Sport
- Country: Afghanistan
- Sport: 100 metres

Robina Jalali, also known as Robina Muqimyar (born 3 July 1986), is a former Olympic athlete who represented Afghanistan at the 2004 and 2008 Olympics and in 30 international events, competing in the 100-meter sprint. She competed athletically under the name Muqimyar and ran for a seat in the lower house of Afghanistan's parliament, the Wolesi Jirga, using her family name of Jalali.

She attracted international attention for running while wearing the hijab, the traditional Muslim woman's head covering. She was one of the first two women ever to represent Afghanistan at the Olympic Games, competing along judoka Friba Rezayee at the 2004 Summer Olympics in Athens.

Jalali was born in Kabul, Afghanistan, and is one of nine children (seven girls and two boys). Her father was a businessman in the computer industry who now runs a non-profit company that teaches Afghan women how to sew. Jalali was home schooled during the era of the Taliban when schooling for girls was forbidden. She attended school after 2001. Describing life under the Taliban, she has said: "There was nothing for us girls to do under the Taliban. You couldn't go to school. You couldn't play, you couldn't do anything. You were just at home all the time."

== 2004 Olympics ==
Muqimyar took part in the women's 100m sprint. She finished seventh out of eight in her heat, with a time of 14.14 seconds, 0.15 seconds ahead of Somalia's Fartun Abukar Omar. The race was won by Jamaica's Veronica Campbell, with a time of 11.17 seconds. Muqimyar was 17 at the time of the event. She ran in "a T-shirt and long green track pants" rather than more aerodynamic competition clothing.

== 2008 Olympics ==
She was not initially due to compete in the 2008 Olympics in Beijing, but joined Afghanistan's delegation after female sprinter Mehboba Ahdyar left her training camp in June to seek political asylum in Norway. At the 2008 Summer Olympics she took part at the 100 metres sprint. In her first round heat she placed eighth and last in a time of 14.80 which was not enough to advance to the second round.

The Guardian described her as a true embodiment of the Olympic spirit:

"The Olympic rings are the most recognised symbol on the planet and every corporate player wants to turn the Games into an advert for soft drinks and credit cards. Yet despite the drug scandals and excess there are still athletes who embody the Olympic spirit. So meet the Afghan sprinter who had to hide from the Taliban, the Brazilian gymnast from the ghetto and the Ecuadorean walker who made a 459km pilgrimage after his first gold medal. They may not all win, but they all deserve our admiration."

== Political career ==
She ran for office as an independent, on a platform of equal rights for women and youth, in the September 2010 parliamentary election. She said she would promote school athletics in Afghanistan if she won a seat, but was not elected.

In 2019 she was elected as a member of parliament. Her term was cut short by the fall of the Afghan government on 15 August 2021, because the Taliban took power.

Since August 2021, there is (as of 29 August) no trace of her.

== See also ==
- Lima Azimi
- Friba Razayee
- Mareena Karim
- Mehboba Ahdyar
