= Ghulam Dastagir (wrestler) =

Afghan wrestler (born 1945)

Ghulam Dastagir (born 24 July 1945 in Kabul) is an Afghan former wrestler who competed in the 1968 Summer Olympics and in the 1972 Summer Olympics.
