= Masoud Azizi =

Afghan athlete

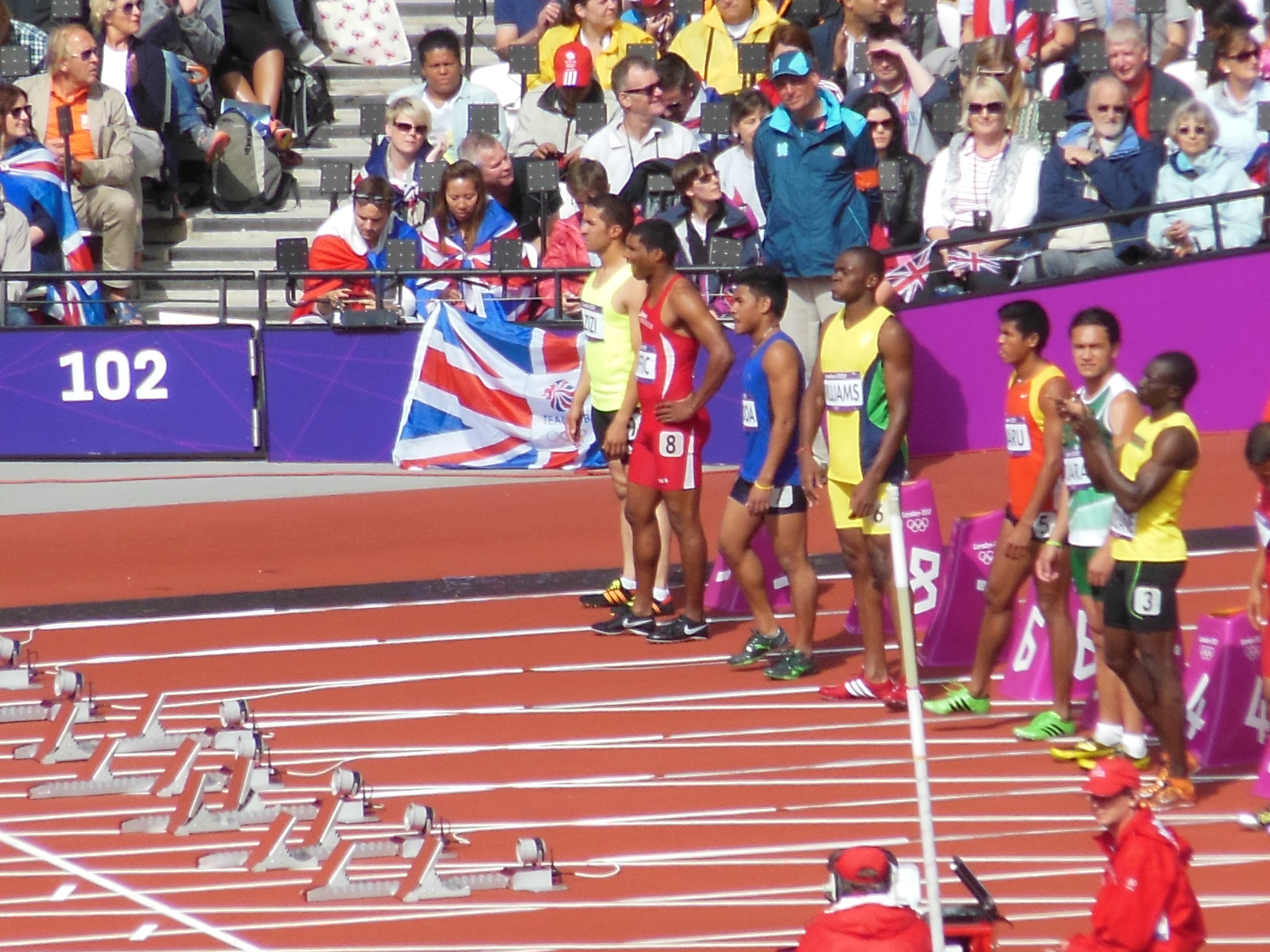
- Before the start of heat 4 of the 100 m at the 2012 Summer Olympics

Personal information
- Nationality: Afghan
- Born: February 2, 1985 (age 41)
- Height: 1.75 m (5 ft 9 in)
- Weight: 63 kg (139 lb)

Sport
- Country: Afghanistan
- Sport: Athletics
- Event: 100 metres
- Updated on 21 July 2012

Masoud Azizi (Dari / Persian: مسعود عزیزی; born 2 February 1985) is an Afghan athlete. His personal best time in the 100m sprint is 11.11 seconds, achieved in April 2005 in Mecca. In 2013 Azizi failed a doping test at the 2013 World Championships, and was suspended for two years.

== Early life ==
Azizi was born into a prominent Afghan Pashtun family of the Azizi tribe, a sub-tribe of the Kheshgi tribe.

== Career ==
Azizi represented Afghanistan at the 2004 Summer Olympics in Athens, competing in the men's 100m sprint. He finished last in his heat, with a time of 11.66 seconds. In the 2005 Asian Championships, Azizi came 7th in a time 11.38 seconds. He represented his country again at the 2008 Summer Olympics in Beijing. He competed in the 100 metres and placed 8th in his heat without advancing to the second round. He ran the distance in a time of 11.45 seconds. Azizi also finished 8th in his first-round heat in the 2009 IAAF World Championships in Berlin in 2009 where he ran alongside Dwain Chambers and African record-holder Olusoji Fasuba. He competed again in the preliminary rounds of the 2011 and 2013 World Championships and the 2012 Olympics.

== Doping ==
In 2013 Azizi failed a doping test at 2013 World Championships, and was suspended for two years.

== Personal Bests ==
=== Outdoor ===
Distance	Time	Wind	Location / Date
100m	11.11 sec	+ 0.0 m/s	Mecca / 12 April 2005
200m	22.65 sec	+ 1.9 m/s	Dhaka / 6 February 2010

=== Indoor ===
Distance	Time	Location / Date
60m	7.25 sec	Hanoi / 31 October 2009
