= Kamia Yousufi =

Afghan sprinter

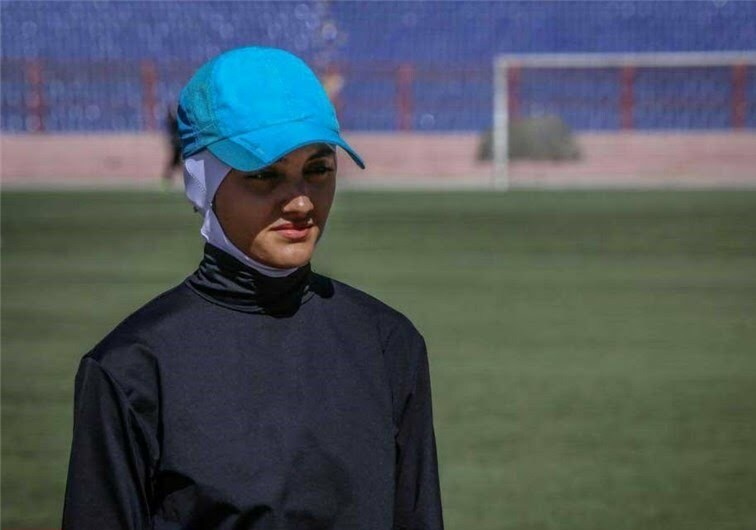

Personal information
- Nationality: Afghan
- Born: May 20, 1996 (age 30) Mashhad, Iran

Sport
- Sport: Running
- Events: 100 meters, 200 meters

Achievements and titles
- Personal bests: 100m: 13.29 s (Tokyo 2020); 200m: 30.39 s (Guwarahati 2016)

Kamia Yousufi (Dari: کیمیا یوسفی; born 20 May 1996 in Mashhad, Iran) is an Afghan female sprinter. Her parents are originally from Kandahar.

== Career ==
She competed at the 2016 Summer Olympics in Rio de Janeiro in the women's 100 metres, where she finished in 22nd place in the preliminary round with a time of 14.02 seconds, a national record. She did not advance to round 1.

At the 2020 Summer Olympics, Yousufi and Farzad Mansouri carried Afghanistan's flag at the Opening Ceremony. Competing at the 100 metres she finished sixth in the first preliminary heat running a time of 13.29 seconds, which was a new personal best and a national record.

In August 2021, as the 2021 Taliban offensive overran the country, Yousufi fled to Iran.

In July 2024, Yousufi was named in a six-person, gender equal Afghanistan team for the 2024 Summer Olympics in Paris. Afghanistan’s ruling Taliban said they did not recognise any female members of the team as only male sports were practiced in the country.

Olympic Games
Preceded by Mohammad Tawfiq Bakhshi	Flagbearer for Afghanistan; Tokyo 2020	Succeeded by Incumbent
