= Cycling at the 1980 Summer Olympics – Men's individual road race =

Men's road race at the Games of the XXII Olympiad
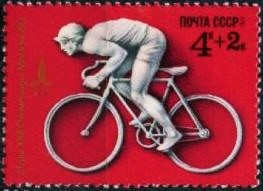
- Soviet stamp commemorating Olympic cycling
- Venue: Moscow
- Date: 28 July
- Competitors: 115 from 32 nations
- Winning time: 4:48:28

Medalists
1st place, gold medalist(s)		Sergei Sukhoruchenkov; Soviet Union
2nd place, silver medalist(s)		Czesław Lang; Poland
3rd place, bronze medalist(s)		Yuri Barinov; Soviet Union

The men's individual road race was an event at the 1980 Summer Olympics in Moscow. 115 cyclists from 32 nations took part. The maximum number of cyclists per nation was four. The event was won by Sergei Sukhoruchenkov of the Soviet Union, the nation's second victory (after 1960; tying France for second-most behind Italy) in the men's individual road race. His teammate Yuri Barinov took bronze. Czesław Lang's silver put Poland on the podium in the event for the second straight Games.

== Background ==
This was the 11th appearance of the event, previously held in 1896 and then at every Summer Olympics since 1936. It replaced the individual time trial event that had been held from 1912 to 1932 (and which would be reintroduced alongside the road race in 1996). The traditional western powers (Italy, France, Belgium, Sweden) in the sport participated in the Moscow Games amid the American-led boycott. In previous years, the boycott would have had little effect on the competition, but in the late 1970s, the United States had its first international cycling star: Greg LeMond (who would turn professional in 1981 and never compete in the Olympics) who would have been the favorite. Instead, host-nation cyclist Sergei Sukhoruchenkov was the pick to win. Gilbert Glaus of Switzerland (1978) and Gianni Giacomini of Italy (1979) had won world championships and were also significant contenders.

Libya and Zimbabwe each made their debut in the men's individual road race. Great Britain made its 11th appearance in the event, the only nation to have competed in each appearance to date.

== Competition format and course ==
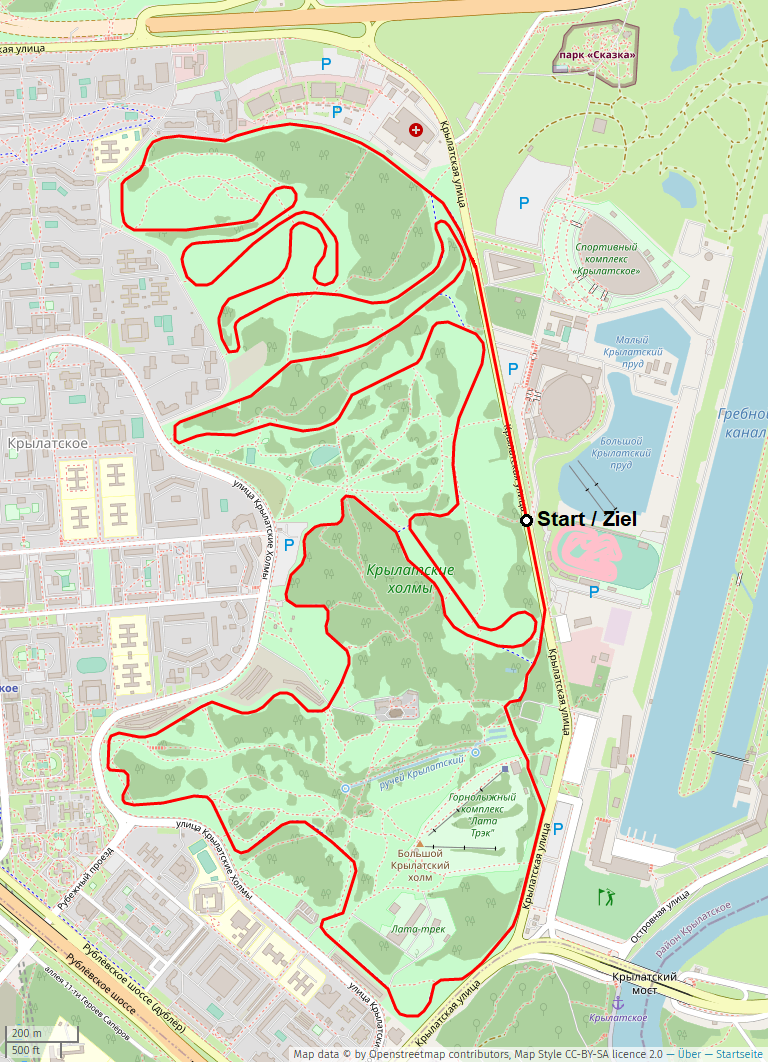
Map of the course

The mass-start race was on a 189 kilometre course at the Krylatskoye Sports Complex in Moscow.

== Schedule ==
All times are Moscow Time (UTC+3)

Date	Time	Round
Monday, 28 July 1980	10:00	Final

== Results ==
Sukhoruchenkov broke away on lap 3, with a chase group including Glaus and Giacomini catching him on lap 5. Sukhoruchenkov broke away from that pack with 32 kilometres to go, riding by himself the rest of the way to the largest margin of victory in the event since 1896.

Rank	Cyclist	Nation	Time
1st place, gold medalist(s)	Sergei Sukhoruchenkov	Soviet Union	4:48:28.9
2nd place, silver medalist(s)	Czesław Lang	Poland	+ 2' 58"
3rd place, bronze medalist(s)	Yuri Barinov	Soviet Union	s.t.
4	Thomas Barth	East Germany	+ 7' 44"
5	Tadeusz Wojtas	Poland	s.t.
6	Anatoly Yarkin	Soviet Union	+ 8' 26"
7	Adri van der Poel	Netherlands	s.t.
8	Christian Faure	France	s.t.
9	Marc Madiot	France	+ 8' 32"
10	Andreas Petermann	East Germany	+ 8' 49"
11	Gilbert Glaus	Switzerland	s.t.
12	Harry Hannus	Finland	s.t.
13	Jiří Škoda	Czechoslovakia	s.t.
14	Marco Cattaneo	Italy	s.t.
15	Jacques Hanegraaf	Netherlands	+ 8' 52"
16	Peter Jonsson	Sweden	+ 9' 05"
17	Vlastibor Konečný	Czechoslovakia	+ 9' 10"
18	Gianni Giacomini	Italy	s.t.
19	Herbert Spindler	Austria	s.t.
20	Jesús Torres	Venezuela	s.t.
21	John Herety	Great Britain	s.t.
22	Krzysztof Sujka	Poland	s.t.
23	Yury Kashirin	Soviet Union	s.t.
24	Kari Puisto	Finland	s.t.
25	Michael Wilson	Australia	s.t.
26	Peter Winnen	Netherlands	s.t.
27	Giuseppe Petito	Italy	s.t.
28	András Takács	Hungary	s.t.
29	Richard Trinkler	Switzerland	+ 12' 09"
30	Francis Castaing	France	+ 15' 39"
31	Henning Jørgensen	Denmark	s.t.
32	Olaf Ludwig	East Germany	s.t.
33	Jacques van Meer	Netherlands	s.t.
34	Mario Medina	Venezuela	s.t.
35	Hubert Seiz	Switzerland	s.t.
36	Johann Traxler	Austria	+ 17' 19"
37	Ladislav Ferebauer	Czechoslovakia	s.t.
38	Mauno Uusivirta	Finland	s.t.
39	Bernt Scheler	Sweden	s.t.
40	Zoltán Halász	Hungary	s.t.
41	Billy Kerr	Ireland	s.t.
42	Verner Blaudzun	Denmark	s.t.
43	Régis Clère	France	s.t.
44	Anders Adamson	Sweden	+ 17' 29"
45	Stephen Roche	Ireland	+ 20' 29"
46	Luc De Smet	Belgium	+ 20' 37"
47	Jeff Williams	Great Britain	s.t.
48	Jürg Luchs	Switzerland	s.t.
49	Neil Martin	Great Britain	s.t.
50	Bruno Bulić	Yugoslavia	+ 22' 07"
51	György Szuromi	Hungary	+ 24' 44"
52	László Halász	Hungary	s.t.
—	Kevin Bradshaw	Australia	DNF
—	Remo Sansonetti	Australia	DNF
—	Graham Seers	Australia	DNF
—	Johann Lienhart	Austria	DNF
—	Jan Nevens	Belgium	DNF
—	Ronald Van Avermaet	Belgium	DNF
—	Jan Wijnants	Belgium	DNF
—	Gilson Alvaristo	Brazil	DNF
—	José Carlos de Lima	Brazil	DNF
—	Fernando Louro	Brazil	DNF
—	Davis Pereira	Brazil	DNF
—	Borislav Asenov	Bulgaria	DNF
—	Yordan Penchev	Bulgaria	DNF
—	Andon Petrov	Bulgaria	DNF
—	Nencho Staykov	Bulgaria	DNF
—	Joseph Evouna	Cameroon	DNF
—	Joseph Kono	Cameroon	DNF
—	Thomas Nyemeg	Cameroon	DNF
—	Nicolas Owona	Cameroon	DNF
—	Gregorio Aldo Arencibia	Cuba	DNF
—	Carlos Cardet	Cuba	DNF
—	Antonio Quintero	Cuba	DNF
—	Michal Klasa	Czechoslovakia	DNF
—	Allan Jacobsen	Denmark	DNF
—	Per Sandahl Jørgensen	Denmark	DNF
—	Zeragaber Gebrehiwot	Ethiopia	DNF
—	Jemal Rogora	Ethiopia	DNF
—	Tilahun Woldesenbet	Ethiopia	DNF
—	Musse Yohannes	Ethiopia	DNF
—	Sixten Wackström	Finland	DNF
—	Joseph Waugh	Great Britain	DNF
—	Bernd Drogan	East Germany	DNF
—	Tony Lally	Ireland	DNF
—	Alberto Minetti	Italy	DNF
—	Peter Aldridge	Jamaica	DNF
—	Salloum Kaysar	Lebanon	DNF
—	Kamal Ghalayni	Lebanon	DNF
—	El-Munsif Ben Youssef	Libya	DNF
—	Ali Hamid El-Aila	Libya	DNF
—	Mohamed Ganfud	Libya	DNF
—	Nuri Kaheil	Libya	DNF
—	Joseph Farrugia	Malta	DNF
—	Carmel Muscat	Malta	DNF
—	Alfred Tonna	Malta	DNF
—	Luvsandagvyn Jargalsaikhan	Mongolia	DNF
—	Batsükhiin Khayankhyarvaa	Mongolia	DNF
—	Dorjpalamyn Tsolmon	Mongolia	DNF
—	Dashjamtsyn Tömörbaatar	Mongolia	DNF
—	Jan Jankiewicz	Poland	DNF
—	Mircea Romaşcanu	Romania	DNF
—	Teodor Vasile	Romania	DNF
—	Maurizio Casadei	San Marino	DNF
—	Mats Gustafsson	Sweden	DNF
—	Olinto Silva	Venezuela	DNF
—	Juan Arroyo	Venezuela	DNF
—	Vinko Polončič	Yugoslavia	DNF
—	Bojan Ropret	Yugoslavia	DNF
—	Bojan Udovič	Yugoslavia	DNF
—	David Gillow	Zimbabwe	DNF
—	Michael McBeath	Zimbabwe	DNF
—	Kurt Zellhofer	Austria	DSQ
—	Albert Micallef	Malta	DSQ
—	Roberto Tomassini	San Marino	DSQ
