= Mongolia at the 1980 Summer Olympics =

- IOC code: MGL
- NOC: Mongolian National Olympic Committee

in Moscow
- Competitors: 43 (39 men and 4 women) in 8 sports
- Flag bearer: Zevegiin Düvchin
- Medals Ranked 27th: Gold 0 Silver 2 Bronze 2 Total 4

Summer Olympics appearances (overview)
- 1964; 1968; 1972; 1976; 1980; 1984; 1988; 1992; 1996; 2000; 2004; 2008; 2012; 2016; 2020; 2024

Mongolia competed at the 1980 Summer Olympics in Moscow, USSR. 43 competitors, 39 men and 4 women, took part in 41 events in 8 sports.

== Medalists ==
=== Silver ===
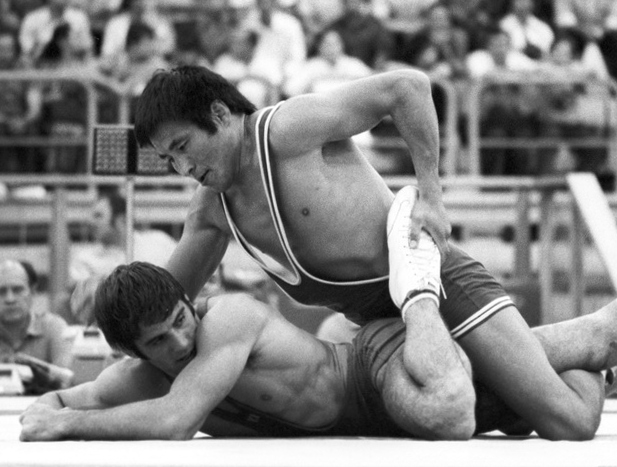
Jamtsyn Davaajav on top of Valentin Raychev (Bulgaria), who in the end won gold in 1980

- Tsendiin Damdin — Judo, Men's Half Lightweight (65 kg)
- Jamtsyn Davaajav — Wrestling, Men's Freestyle Welterweight

=== Bronze ===
- Ravdangiin Davaadalai — Judo, Men's Lightweight (71 kg)
- Dugarsürengiin Oyuunbold — Wrestling, Men's Freestyle Bantamweight

== Archery ==
In the third time they competed in archery at the Olympics, Mongolia entered two men and two women. Both of the men were returning veterans from the 1976 games while both of the women were Olympic rookies. The men both improved upon their scores and ranks from four years before.
Women's Individual Competition:

- Chagdar Biambasuren — 2216 (→ 23rd place)
- Tsedendorj Bazarsuren — 2112 (→ 29th place)

Men's Individual Competition:

- Niamtseren Biambasuren — 2361 points (→ 19th place)
- Tserendorjin Dagvadorj — 2318 points (→ 23rd place)

== Boxing ==
Men's Light Flyweight (– 48 kg)

- Vandui Bayasgalan

- First Round — Lost to Gilberto Sosa (Mexico) on points (1-4)

Men's Flyweight (– 51 kg)

- Nyama Narantuya

- First Round — Lost to Ramon Armando Guevara (Venezuela) on points (0-5)

Men's Bantamweight (– 54 kg)

- Tseden Narmandakh

- First Round — Bye
- Second Round — Lost to Joseph Ahanda (Cameroon) after referee stopped contest in third round

Men's Featherweight (– 57 kg)

- Ravsal Otgonbayar

- First Round — Defeated Abdulzhava Jawad Ali (Iraq) on points (4-1)
- Second Round — Lost to Carlos González (Mexico) on points (2-3)

Men's Lightweight (– 60 kg)

- Galsandorj Batbileg

- First Round — Defeated Alberto Mendes Coelho (Angola) on points (5-0)
- Second Round — Defeated Jesper Garnell (Denmark) on points (4-1)
- Quarter Finals — Lost to Angel Herrera (Cuba) on points (0-5)

Men's Light-Welterweight (– 63,5 kg)

- Khast Jamgan

- First Round — Bye
- Second Round — Lost to William Lyimo (Tanzania) on points (0-5)

== Cycling ==
Five cyclists represented Mongolia in 1980.

Individual road race

- Luvsandagvyn Jargalsaikhan
- Batsükhiin Khayankhyarvaa
- Dorjpalamyn Tsolmon
- Dashjamtsyn Tömörbaatar

Team time trial

- Luvsandagvyn Jargalsaikhan
- Batsükhiin Khayankhyarvaa
- Damdinsürengiin Orgodol
- Dashjamtsyn Tömörbaatar
