= Giro delle Regioni =

Gran Premio Palio del Recioto
Race details
- Date: April–May
- Region: Italy
- Discipline: Road race
- Competition: UCI Europe Tour
- Type: Stage race

History
- First edition: 1976
- Editions: 34
- Final edition: 2010
- First winner: Carmelo Barone (ITA)
- Most wins: Sergei Sukhoruchenkov (URS) (2 wins)
- Final winner: Enrico Battaglin (ITA)

The Giro delle Regioni was a multi-day cycling race held annually in Italy. It is part of UCI Europe Tour in category 2.ncup, meaning it was part of the UCI Under 23 Nations' Cup.

== Winners ==
Year	Winner	Second	Third
1976	(Italy) Carmelo Barone	(Italy) Giuseppe Passuello	(Italy) Dino Porrini
1977	(Belgium) Eddy Schepers	(Italy) Claudio Corti	(Netherlands) Henk Mutsaars
1978	(Soviet Union) Aavo Pikkuus	(Soviet Union) Yuri Zakharov	(Sweden) Tommy Prim
1979	(Soviet Union) Sergei Sukhoruchenkov	(Soviet Union) Aleksandr Averin	(Soviet Union) Sergei Nikitenko
1980	(Italy) Alberto Minetti	(Italy) Marco Cattaneo	(Bulgaria) Jordan Penschev
1981	(Soviet Union) Sergei Sukhoruchenkov	(Soviet Union) Yuri Barinov	(Soviet Union) Ivan Mitchenko
1982	(Soviet Union) Ivan Mitchenko	(Soviet Union) Viktor Demidenko	(Belgium) Nico Emonds
1983	(Austria) Helmut Wechselberger	(Cuba) Eduardo Alonso Gonzalez	(United States) Thurlow Rogers
1984	(Czechoslovakia) Jiří Škoda	(Soviet Union) Sergey Voronin	(East Germany) Uwe Raab
1985	(Italy) Flavio Giupponi	(Socialist Federal Republic of Yugoslavia) Primož Čerin	(France) Bernard Richard
1986	(Czechoslovakia) Jiří Škoda	(Italy) Maurizio Fondriest	(Soviet Union) Valeri Malaschenkov
1987	(Soviet Union) Dimitri Konyshev	(West Germany) Dieter Nieheus	(Soviet Union) Viktor Klimov
1988	(Italy) Sergio Carcano	(Soviet Union) Sergei Uslamin	(East Germany) Maik Landsmann
1989	(France) Christophe Manin	(Austria) Dietmar Hauer	(Switzerland) Rolf Rutschmann
1990	(Austria) Dietmar Hauer	(Italy) Roberto Caruso	(Soviet Union) Pavel Tonkov
1991	(Italy) Davide Rebellin	(France) José Lamy	(Italy) Nicola Minali
1992	(Italy) Roberto Petito	(Germany) Andreas Lebsanft	(Kazakhstan) Alexandr Shefer
1993	(Russia) Pavel Tcherkasov	(France) Laurent Roux	(Switzerland) Oscar Camenzind
1994	(Germany) Dirk Baldinger	(Italy) Eddy Mazzoleni	(Spain) Rafael Díaz Justo
1995	(Germany) Tobias Steinhauser	(Germany) Uwe Peschel	(Italy) Daniele Sgnaolin
1996	(Italy) Giuliano Figueras	(Italy) Alessandro Spezialetti	(Spain) Unai Osa
1997	(Italy) Fabio Malberti	(Italy) Danilo Di Luca	(Italy) Gianmario Ortenzi
1998	(Italy) Gianmario Ortenzi	(Italy) Valentino China	(Italy) Denis Lunghi
1999	(Italy) Leonardo Giordani	(Italy) Ivan Basso	(Ukraine) Volodymyr Gustov
2000	(Italy) Graziano Gasparre	(Germany) Patrik Sinkewitz	(Italy) Giampaolo Caruso
2001	(Ukraine) Yaroslav Popovych	(Italy) Michele Scarponi	(Italy) Damiano Cunego
2002	(Italy) Antonio Quadranti	(Russia) Vladimir Gusev	(Russia) Alexander Bespalov
2003	(Slovenia) Kristjan Fajt	(Ukraine) Denys Kostyuk	(Slovenia) Tomaž Nose
2004	(Ukraine) Andriy Hrivko	(Russia) Maxim Belkov	(Italy) Giovanni Visconti
2005	(Italy) Luigi Sestili	(Czech Republic) Roman Kreuziger	(Slovakia) Peter Velits
2006	(Ukraine) Dmytro Grabovskyy	(Russia) Maxim Belkov	(Belgium) Jelle Vanendert
2007	(Portugal) Rui Costa	(Netherlands) Dennis van Winden	(Slovenia) Gašper Švab
2008	(Ukraine) Vitaly Buts	(Portugal) Rui Costa	(Slovenia) Kristjan Koren
2009	No race		
2010	(Italy) Enrico Battaglin	(Slovenia) Jan Tratnik	(Italy) Angelo Pagani
