= Cycling at the 1980 Summer Olympics – Men's team time trial =

Men's team time trial at the Games of the XXII Olympiad
- Venue: Moscow
- Date: 20 July
- Competitors: 92 from 23 nations
- Winning time: 2:01:21

Medalists
1st place, gold medalist(s)		Yury Kashirin, Oleg Logvin, Sergey Shelpakov, Anatoly Yarkin	Soviet Union
2nd place, silver medalist(s)		Falk Boden, Bernd Drogan, Olaf Ludwig, Hans-Joachim Hartnick	East Germany
3rd place, bronze medalist(s)		Michal Klasa, Vlastibor Konečný, Alipi Kostadinov, Jiří Škoda	Czechoslovakia

The men's team time trial event was part of the road cycling programme at the 1980 Summer Olympics. The time for the team was stopped after the third person on the team crossed the finish line. The venue for this event was the Minskoye Shosse (Moscow - Minsk Highway), Moscow, Soviet Union. This event was held on 20 July 1980.

== Final standings ==
Rank	Cyclists	Team	Time
1st place, gold medalist(s)	Yury Kashirin; Oleg Logvin; Sergey Shelpakov; Anatoly Yarkin	Soviet Union	2:01:21.74
2nd place, silver medalist(s)	Falk Boden; Bernd Drogan; Olaf Ludwig; Hans-Joachim Hartnick	East Germany	2:02:53.19
3rd place, bronze medalist(s)	Michal Klasa; Vlastibor Konečný; Alipi Kostadinov; Jiří Škoda	Czechoslovakia	2:02:53.89
4	Stefan Ciekański; Jan Jankiewicz; Czesław Lang; Witold Plutecki	Poland	2:04:13.8
5	Mauro De Pellegrini; Gianni Giacomini; Ivano Maffei; Alberto Minetti	Italy	2:04:36.2
6	Borislav Asenov; Venelin Khubenov; Yordan Penchev; Nencho Staykov	Bulgaria	2:05:55.2
7	Harry Hannus; Kari Puisto; Patrick Wackström; Sixten Wackström	Finland	2:05:58.2
8	Bruno Bulić; Vinko Polončič; Bojan Ropret; Bojan Udovič	Yugoslavia	2:07:12.0
9	Robert Downs; Des Fretwell; Steve Jones; Joseph Waugh	Great Britain	2:07:30.6
10	Per Kærsgaard Laursen; Michael Markussen; Jesper Worre; Jørgen Pedersen	Denmark	2:07:42.3
11	Kevin Bradshaw; Remo Sansonetti; David Scarfe; Michael Wilson	Australia	2:08:25.2
12	Anders Adamson; Bengt Asplund; Mats Gustafsson; Håkan Karlsson	Sweden	2:08:33.7
13	Johann Lienhart; Peter Muckenhuber; Herbert Spindler; Johann Summer	Austria	2:09:17.7
14	Gilbert Glaus; Fritz Joost; Jürg Luchs; Richard Trinkler	Switzerland	2:09:48.9
15	Guus Bierings; Jacques Hanegraaf; Theo Hogervorst; Adri van der Poel	Netherlands	2:10:17.3
16	Patrick du Chau; Marc Sergeant; Gerrit Van Gestel; Leo Wellens	Belgium	2:10:27.5
17	Tamás Csathó; László Halász; Zoltán Halász; András Takács	Hungary	2:10:54.9
18	Claudio Pérez; Olinto Silva; Juan Arroyo; Mario Medina	Venezuela	2:14:15.8
19	Luvsandagvyn Jargalsaikhan; Batsükhiin Khayankhyarvaa; Damdinsürengiin Orgodol; Dashjamtsyn Tömörbaatar	Mongolia	2:15:04.5
20	Joseph Farrugia; Albert Micallef; Carmel Muscat; Alfred Tonna	Malta	2:23:50.1
21	Ali Hamid El-Aila; Mohamed El-Kamaa; Nuri Kaheil; Khalid Shebani	Libya	2:24:48.2
22	Charles Bana; Toussaint Fouda; Joseph Kono; Nicolas Owona	Cameroon	2:26:46.6
23	Haile Micael Kedir; Ayele Mekonnen; Tadesse Mekonnen; Tilahun Alemayehu	Ethiopia	2:35:47.8
