= Anatoly Yarkin =

Soviet cyclist

Personal information
- Born: 11 November 1958 (age 67) Nove, Tokmak Raion, Zaporizhzhia Oblast, Ukrainian SSR
- Height: 1.86 m (6 ft 1 in)
- Weight: 77 kg (170 lb)

Cycling career
- Sport: Cycling
Medal record
Representing the Soviet Union
Olympic Games
Gold medal – first place	1980 Moscow	Team time trial
World Championships
Silver medal – second place	1981 Prague	Team time trial

Anatoly Nikolayevich Yarkin (Russian: Анатолий Николаевич Яркин; born 11 November 1958) is a retired Soviet cyclist. He was part of the Soviet team that won the time trial event at the 1980 Summer Olympics. Individually, he finished in sixth place in the road race, helping Sergei Sukhoruchenkov and Yuri Barinov to win the race. Next year, he won a silver medal in the team time trial at the 1981 UCI Road World Championships.

He retired from the Soviet team in 1984, but a few years later competed for a club in Chile. After that he worked as a cycling coach in Samara and later as a popularizer of mountain biking in Tolyatti.
