= Klasa =

Klasa is a surname. Notable people with the surname include:

- Józef Klasa (1931–2023), Polish diplomat and politician
- Michal Klasa (born 1953), Czechoslav cyclist
