= 1979 UCI Road World Championships =

- Venue: Valkenburg, Netherlands
- Date: 26 August 1979
- Coordinates: 50°51′54″N 05°49′52″E

The 1979 UCI Road World Championships took place on 26 August 1979 in Valkenburg, the Netherlands.

In the same period, the 1979 UCI Track Cycling World Championships were organized in Amsterdam.

== Results ==
Race:	Gold:	Time	Silver:	Time	Bronze :	Time
Men
Men's road race	Jan Raas; Netherlands	7.03'09"	Dietrich Thurau; West Germany	-	Jean-René Bernaudeau; France	-
Amateurs' road race	Gianni Giacomini; Italy	-	Jan Jankiewicz; Poland	-	Bernd Drogan; East Germany	-
Team time trial	East Germany; Bernd Drogan; Hans-Joachim Hartnick; Andreas Petermann; Falk Boden	-	Poland; Jan Jankiewicz; Czesław Lang; Stefan Ciekański; Witold Plutecki	-	Norway; Geir Digerud; Morten Sæther; Jostein Wilmann; Hans Petter Ødegård	-
Women
Women's road race	Petra De Bruin; Netherlands	-	Jenny De Smet; Belgium	-	Beate Habetz; West Germany	-

== Medal table ==
Rank	Nation	Gold	Silver	Bronze	Total
1	Netherlands (NED)	2	0	0	2
2	East Germany (DDR)	1	0	1	2
3	Italy (ITA)	1	0	0	1
4	Poland (POL)	0	2	0	2
5	West Germany (FRG)	0	1	1	2
6	Belgium (BEL)	0	1	0	1
7	France (FRA)	0	0	1	1
7	Norway (NOR)	0	0	1	1
Totals (8 entries)		4	4	4	12
