= Christian Faure =

Christian Faure may refer to:

- Christian Fauré (cyclist) (born 1951), French cyclist
- Christian Faure (director) (born 1954), French screenwriter and film director
