= Vedernikov =

Vedernikov (masculine, Russian: Ведерников) or Vedernikova (feminine, Russian: Ведерникова) is a Russian surname. Notable people with the surname include:

- Alexander Vedernikov (1964–2020), Russian conductor
- Alexander Vedernikov (bass) (1927–2018), Russian opera singer and music educator
- Andrei Vedernikov (1959–2020), Russian Olympic cyclist
- Mikhail Vedernikov (born 1975), Russian politician
- Egor Vedernikov (born 2014), Russian musician
- Egor Vedernikov (born 2001), Russian athlete
