= Marco Cattaneo =

Marco Cattaneo may refer to:

- Marco Cattaneo (cyclist, born 1957), Italian cyclist
- Marco Cattaneo (cyclist, born 1982), Italian cyclist
- Marco Cattaneo (cross-country skier) (born 1974), Italian cross-country skier, American Birkebeiner winner
