= Udovič =

Udovič is a surname. Notable people with the surname include:

- Bojan Udovič (1957–2015), Slovene cyclist
- Sašo Udovič (born 1968), Slovenian footballer
