= Kashirin =

Kashirin (Russian: Каширин) is a Russian masculine surname, its feminine counterpart is Kashirina. Notable people with the surname include:

- Tatiana Kashirina (born 1991), Russian weightlifter
- Yury Kashirin (born 1959), Russian cyclist
