= Steffen Rein =

German cyclist

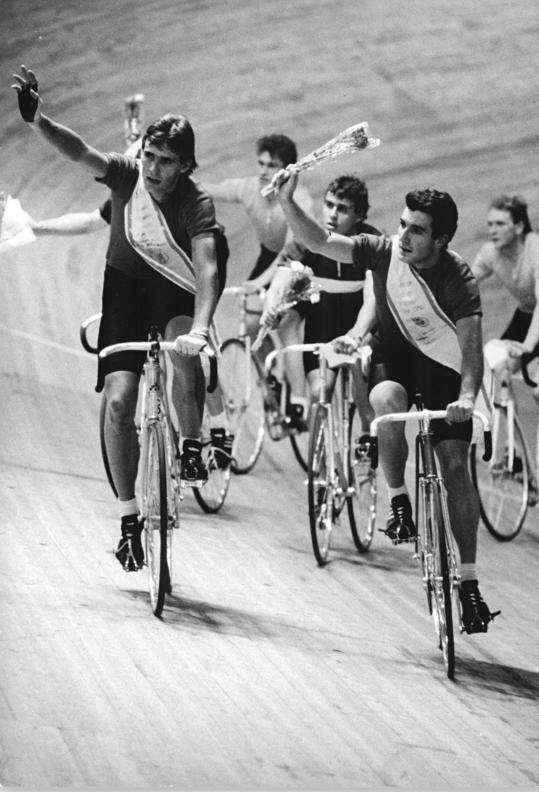
- Rein (left) in 1988

Personal information
- Born: 27 September 1968 (age 58) Halle-Neustadt, East Germany

Cycling career
- Sport: Cycling
- Discipline: Road
- Role: Rider; Directeur sportif

Professional team
- 1996–1997: Team Nürnberger

Managerial team
- 2002–2004: Team Wiesenhof

Steffen Rein (born 27 September 1968) is a German former racing cyclist. Rein had a successful amateur career, winning the Gran Premio di Lugano, Tour d'Algérie, Rund um die Hainleite and the Thüringen Rundfahrt among other races, before turning professional in 1996. He retired in 1997 after spending two seasons with Team Nürnberger.

== Major results ==
1987
1st Stage 1 Tour de Tunisie
1988
1st Overall Tour d'Algérie
1989
1st Overall Grand Prix Cycliste de Gemenc
1st Overall Thüringen Rundfahrt
1st Rund um die Hainleite
1st Stage 5 Okolo Slovenska
1st Stage 8 Vuelta a Cuba
1st Stage 4 DDR-Rundfahrt
4th Overall Tour of Hellas

1st Stages 4 & 5

1990
1st Overall Ernst-Sachs-Tour
1st Berlin–Leipzig
1st Stage 6 Sachsen Tour
1991
1st Road race, National Amateur Road Championships
1st Stage 3 Tour du Vaucluse
1992
1st Gran Premio di Lugano
1st Stage 3 Niederösterreich Rundfahrt
1993
1st Rund um die Nürnberger Altstadt
1st Stage 2 Sachsen Tour
1994
1st Time trial, World Military Road Championships
1st GP Buchholz
1995
1st Stage 3 Niedersachsen Rundfahrt
1996
1st Stage 4 Tour de Normandie
3rd HEW Cyclassics
3rd Rund um Düren
1997
1st Stage 9 Niedersachsen Rundfahrt
