= Tsolmon =

Tsolmon (Mongolian: Цолмон) is a Mongolian given name used for men and women meaning Venus. Notable people with the name include:

- Adiyaasambuugiin Tsolmon (born 1992), Mongolian judoka
- Dorjpalamyn Tsolmon (born 1957), Mongolian cyclist
