= 1981 UCI Road World Championships =

Championships

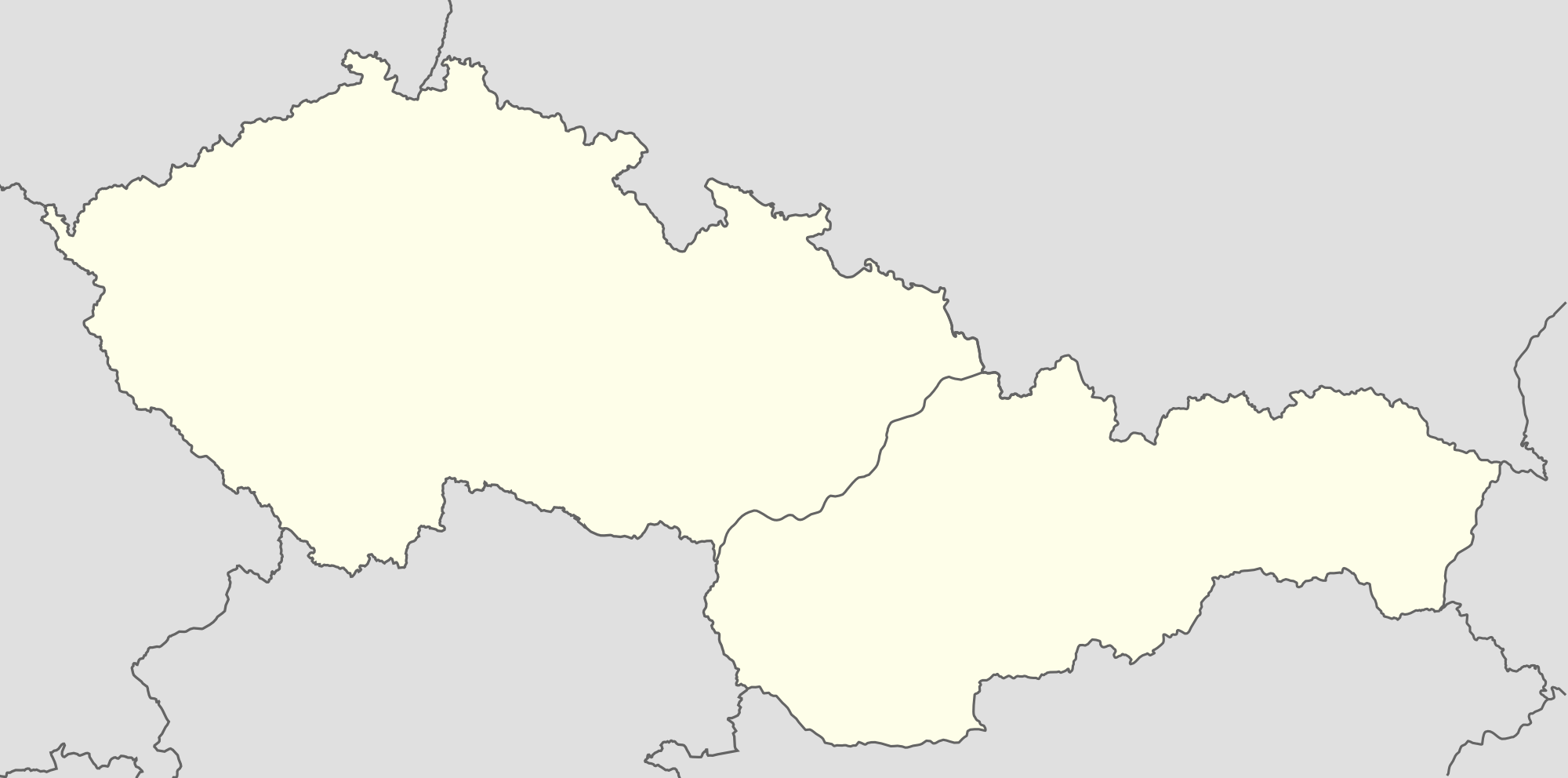
- Location within Czechoslovakia
- Venue: Prague, Czechoslovakia
- Date: 30 August 1981
- Coordinates: 50°05′N 14°25′E
- Events: 4

The 1981 UCI Road World Championships took place on 30 August 1981 in Prague, Czechoslovakia.

In the same period, the 1981 UCI Track Cycling World Championships were organized in Brno.

== Results ==
Race:	Gold:	Time	Silver:	Time	Bronze :	Time
Men
Men's road race	Freddy Maertens; Belgium	7.21'59"	Giuseppe Saronni; Italy	s.t.	Bernard Hinault; France	s.t
Amateurs' road race	Andrei Vedernikov; Soviet Union	-	Rudy Rogiers; Belgium	-	Gilbert Glaus; Switzerland	-
Team time trial	East Germany; Falk Boden; Bernd Drogan; Mario Kummer; Olaf Ludwig	-	Soviet Union; Youri Kashirin; Oleg Logvin; Sergey Shelpakov; Anatoli Yarkin	-	Czechoslovakia; Milan Jurčo; Michal Klasa; Alipi Kostadinov; Jiří Škoda	-
Women
Women's road race	Ute Enzenauer; West Germany	-	Jeannie Longo; France	-	Connie Carpenter; United States	-

== Medal table ==
Rank	Nation	Gold	Silver	Bronze	Total
1	Belgium (BEL)	1	1	0	2
1	Soviet Union (URS)	1	1	0	2
3	East Germany (DDR)	1	0	0	1
3	West Germany (FRG)	1	0	0	1
5	France (FRA)	0	1	1	2
6	Italy (ITA)	0	1	0	1
7	Czechoslovakia (TCH)	0	0	1	1
7	Switzerland (SUI)	0	0	1	1
7	United States (USA)	0	0	1	1
Totals (9 entries)		4	4	4	12

== List of professional riders ==
NB : List of teams by number of riders then alphabetically.
The maximum number of riders per team was 12, plus the titleholder Bernard Hinault.
The number of riders at the start was 112 with 69 finishers (43 abandoned)

Team France

Team Belgium

Team Spain

- Dominique Arnaud (35th)
- Charly Bérard (60th)
- Jean-René Bernaudeau (20th)
- Serge Beucherie (22nd)
- Jacques Bossis (41st)
- Gilbert Duclos-Lassalle (4th)
- ~~Jean-Louis Gauthier~~
- Bernard Hinault (3rd)
- Maurice Le Guilloux (64th)
- Marc Madiot (24th)
- Jean-François Rodriguez (37th)
- Marcel Tinazzi (32nd)
- Bernard Vallet (68th)
- Jan Bogaert (39th)
- Claude Criquielion (25th)
- ~~Roger De Vlaeminck~~
- Fons De Wolf (7th)
- Freddy Maertens
- René Martens (28th)
- ~~Patrick Pevenage~~
- Guido Van Calster (5th)
- Jean-Luc Vandenbroucke (57th)
- ~~Herman Van Springel~~
- ~~Gery Verlinden~~
- ~~Daniel Willems~~
- Bernardo Alfonsel (54th)
- ~~Ángel Arroyo~~
- ~~Alberto Fernández Blanco~~
- Juan Fernández Martín (55th)
- ~~Eulalio Garcia Pereda~~
- ~~Rafael Ladrón de Guevara~~
- ~~Miguel María Lasa~~
- Ismael Lejarreta (16th)
- Marino Lejarreta (15th)
- ~~Enrique Martínez Heredia~~
- Faustino Rupérez (58th)
- Jesús Suárez Cueva (53rd)

Team Italy

Team Netherlands

Team Switzerland

- ~~Marino Amadori~~
- Gianbattista Baronchelli (27th)
- Giovanni Battaglin (26th)
- Silvano Contini (17th)
- Pierino Gavazzi (10th)
- Luciano Loro (59th)
- Palmiro Masciarelli (30th)
- Francesco Moser (6th)
- Wladimiro Panizza (29th)
- Giuseppe Saronni (2nd)
- Claudio Torelli (36th)
- ~~Alfio Vandi~~
- Theo de Rooij (18th)
- ~~Jacques Hanegraaf~~
- ~~Gerrie Knetemann~~
- Hennie Kuiper (69th)
- ~~Henk Lubberding~~
- ~~Jan Raas~~
- ~~Aad van den Hoek~~
- ~~Adri van der Poel~~
- Johan van der Velde (11th)
- ~~Ad Wijnands~~
- Peter Winnen (40th)
- Joop Zoetemelk (21st)
- ~~Beat Breu~~
- Serge Demierre (13th)
- Guido Frei (52nd)
- Daniel Gisiger (51st)
- Jean Marie Grezet (49th)
- Fridolin Keller (38th)
- Erwin Lienhard (19th)
- ~~Patrick Moerlen~~
- Stefan Mutter (8th)
- Gottfried Schmutz (56th)
- ~~Josef Wehrli~~
- Bruno Wolfer (9th)

Team West Germany :

Team Norway

Team United Kingdom

- Uwe Bolten (45th)
- Gregor Braun (31st)
- ~~Rolf Haller~~
- ~~Hans Hindelang~~
- ~~Hans-Peter Jakst~~
- Peter Kehl (67th)
- ~~Hans Neumayer~~
- Klaus-Peter Thaler (12th)
- Dietrich Thurau (62nd)
- ~~Rudi Weber~~
- ~~Geir Digerud~~
- Knut Knudsen (65th)
- ~~Dag Selander~~
- Jostein Wilmann (34th)
- ~~Dudley Hayton~~
- ~~Graham Jones~~
- Robert Millar (14th)
- ~~Paul Sherwen~~

(United States) Team USA

Team Australia

Team Denmark

- Jonathan Boyer (48th)
- ~~John Eustice~~
- Greg LeMond (47th)
- George Mount (46th)
- Wayne Hildred (50th)
- ~~John Trevorrow~~
- ~~Gary Wiggins~~
- Per Bausager (43rd)
- ~~Jørgen Marcussen~~
- ~~Freddy Reimer~~

Team Sweden

Team Austria :

(Republic of Ireland) Team Ireland

- Sven-Åke Nilsson (23rd)
- Tommy Prim (33rd)
- Alf Segersäll (44th)
- ~~Erich Jagsch~~
- ~~Gerhard Schönbacher~~
- Sean Kelly (42nd)
- Stephen Roche (61st)

Tean Luxembourg

Team Canada

Team New Zealand

- Lucien Didier (63rd)
- Eugène Urbany (66th)
- ~~Richard Meehan~~
- ~~John Patrick Mullan~~
