= 1995 Scheldeprijs =

Race details
- Dates: 19 April 1995
- Stages: 1
- Distance: 209 km (129.9 mi)
- Winning time: 4h 58' 15"

Results
	Winner	Rossano Brasi (ITA)	(Polti–Granarolo–Santini)
	Second	Peter Roes (BEL)	(Vlaanderen 2002–Eddy Merckx)
	Third	Giovanni Fidanza (ITA)	(Polti–Granarolo–Santini)

The 1995 Scheldeprijs was the 82nd edition of the Scheldeprijs cycle race and was held on 19 April 1995. The race was won by Rossano Brasi of the Polti team.

== General classification ==
Final general classification

Rank	Rider	Team	Time
1	Rossano Brasi (ITA)	Polti–Granarolo–Santini	4h 58' 15"
2	Peter Roes (BEL)	Vlaanderen 2002–Eddy Merckx	+ 39"
3	Giovanni Fidanza (ITA)	Polti–Granarolo–Santini	+ 1' 22"
4	Eric Vanderaerden (BEL)	Brescialat–Fago	+ 1' 22"
5	Djamolidine Abdoujaparov (UZB)	Novell–Decca–Colnago	+ 1' 22"
6	Wiebren Veenstra (NED)	Motorola	+ 1' 22"
7	Peter Van Petegem (BEL)	TVM–Polis Direct	+ 1' 22"
8	Hendrik Redant (BEL)	TVM–Polis Direct	+ 1' 22"
9	Erik Zabel (GER)	Team Telekom	+ 1' 22"
10	Wilfried Nelissen (BEL)	Lotto–Isoglass	+ 1' 22"
