= Claudio Pérez (cyclist) =

Venezuelan cyclist

Personal information
- Born: 1 March 1957 (age 69)

Cycling career
- Sport: Cycling

Claudio Pérez (born 1 March 1957) is a Venezuelan former cyclist. He competed in the team time trial event at the 1980 Summer Olympics.
