= Opbrakel =

- Village
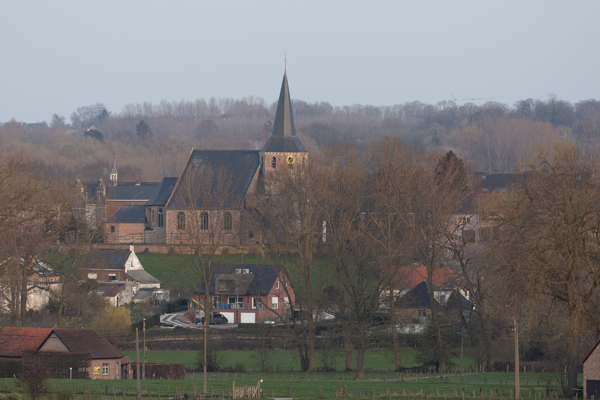
- View on Opbrakel

- Location in Belgium
- Coordinates: 50.7925°N 3.7481°E
- Country: Belgium
- Region: Flemish Region
- Province: East Flanders
- Municipality: Brakel

Area
  - Total: 8.74 km^{2} (3.37 sq mi)

Population (2021)
  - Total: 1,648
  - Density: 189/km^{2} (488/sq mi)
- Time zone: CET

Opbrakel is a village and deelgemeente (sub-municipality) of the municipality of Brakel. It is located in the Denderstreek in the province of East Flanders in Belgium. It used to be an independent municipality until 1971 when it was merged into Brakel.

== Overview ==
The area used to be covered in forest, but only the Brakelbos to the south of Opbrakel has remained. The forest has become a 52 hectares (130 acres) nature area and varies in height from 65 to 130 metres.

The village was first mentioned in 866 as villa Braglo, and is a Germanic forest name. Opbrakel used to be a heerlijkheid, and used to have a castle named Herenhof which was demolished in 1863. In 1885, a railway station opened on the Zottegem to Ronse railway line. The railway line closed in 1963.

The grist mill Verrebeekmolen was built between 1789 and 1803. In 1909, an electric motor was installed in the windmill, and by 1938 the windmill was no longer in operation. It was repaired between 1996 and 1997. It is in service every last Sunday of the month and open for visitors.

The St Martinus Church is a three aisled basilica-like church with an octagonal tower from the 13th century. The church dates from the mid 18th century. Unlike most churches it is oriented to the north.

In 1963, the municipality borders were corrected based on language, and the neighbourhood of d'Hutte which used to belong to Flobecq was transferred to Opbrakel. The municipality covered an area of 8.42 square kilometres (3.25 sq mi). In 1971, Opbrakel was merged into the municipality of Brakel and became a deelgemeente. The village is mainly an agricultural community, but is developing into a commuter's village.

== Notable people ==
- Serge Baguet (1969–2017), professional road bicycle racer
- Patrick du Chau (born 1959), former cyclist
- Lietbertus (c. 1010–1076), bishop of Cambrai and Catholic Saint
- Sandy Martens (born 1972), retired football player

== Gallery ==
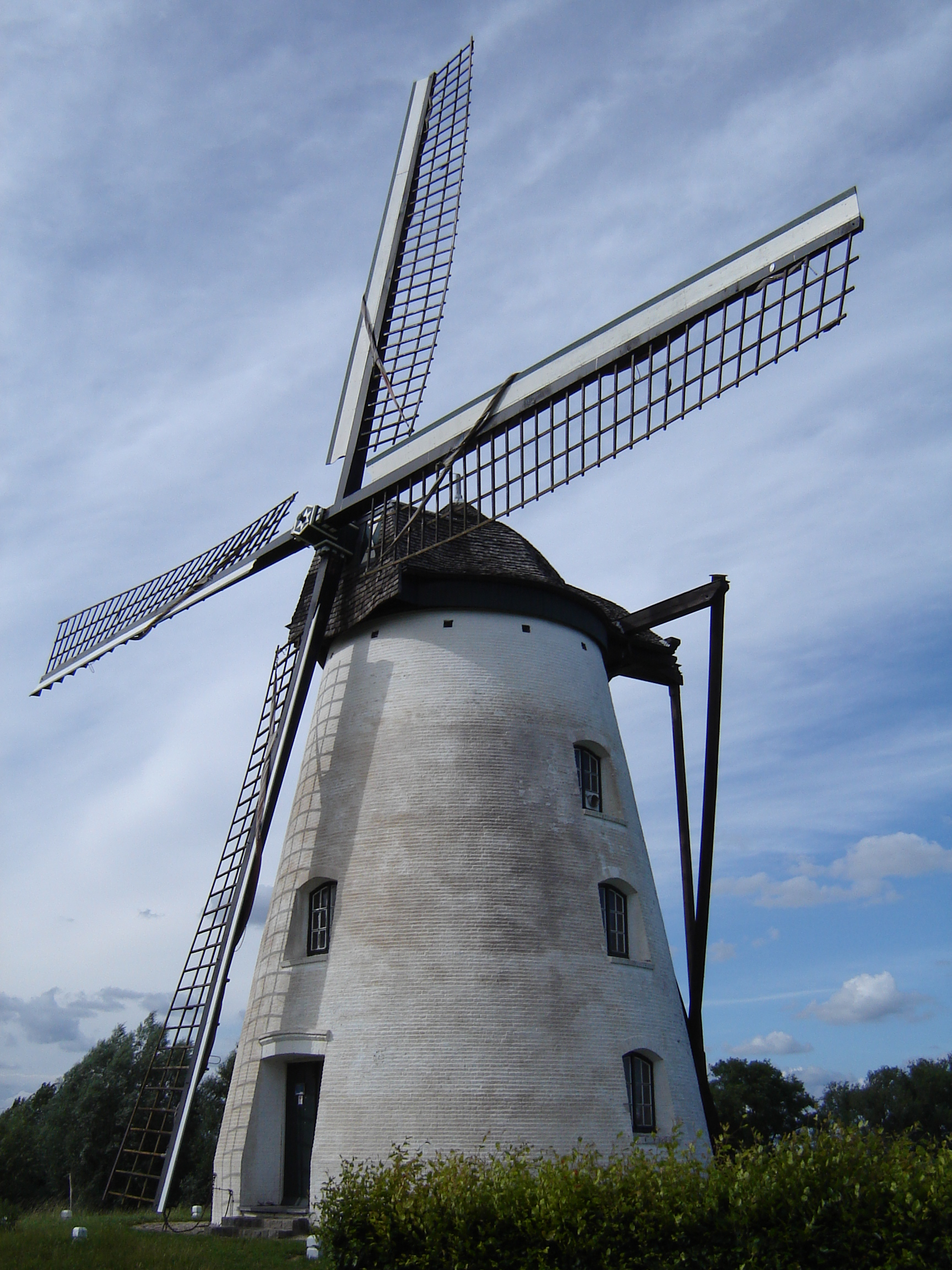
Windmill Verrebeekmolen

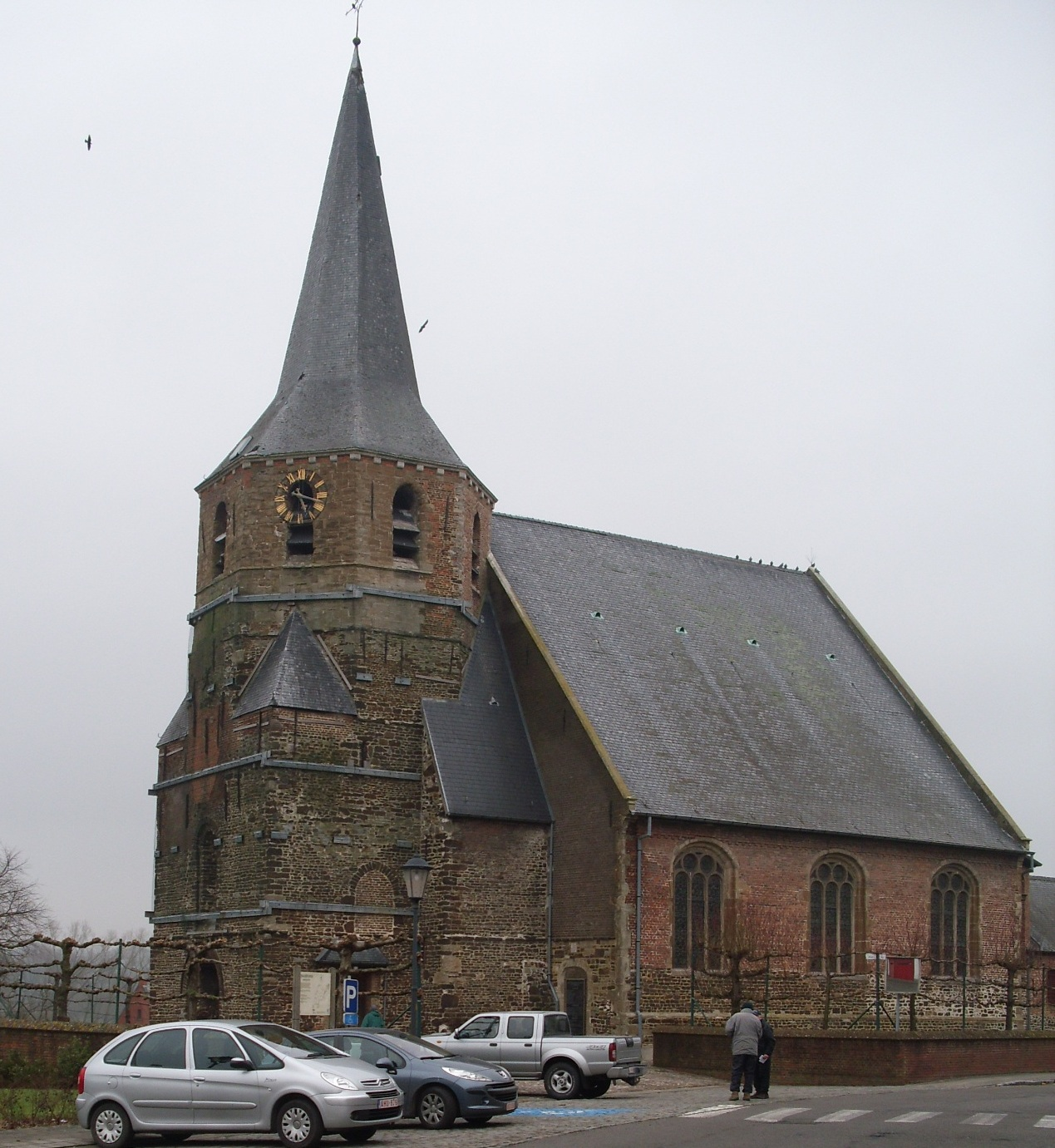
St Martinus Church

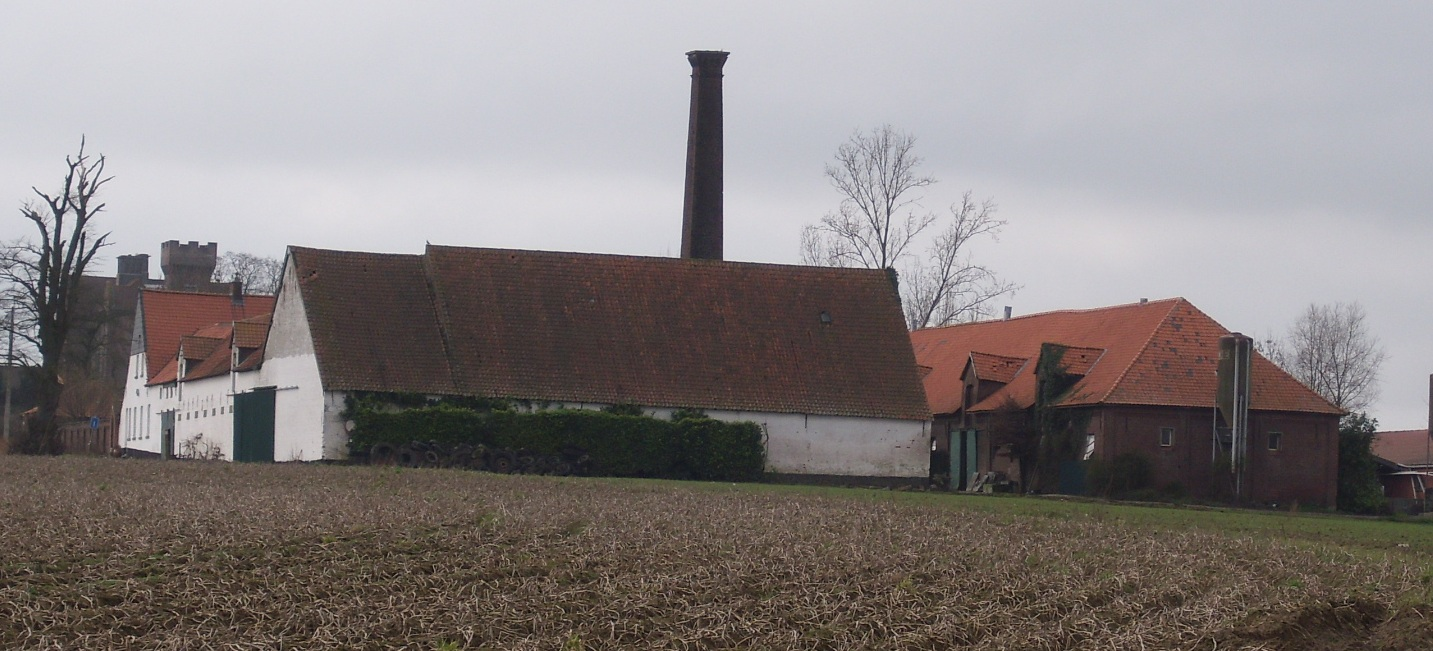
Former abbey farm Hof te Wolfskerke

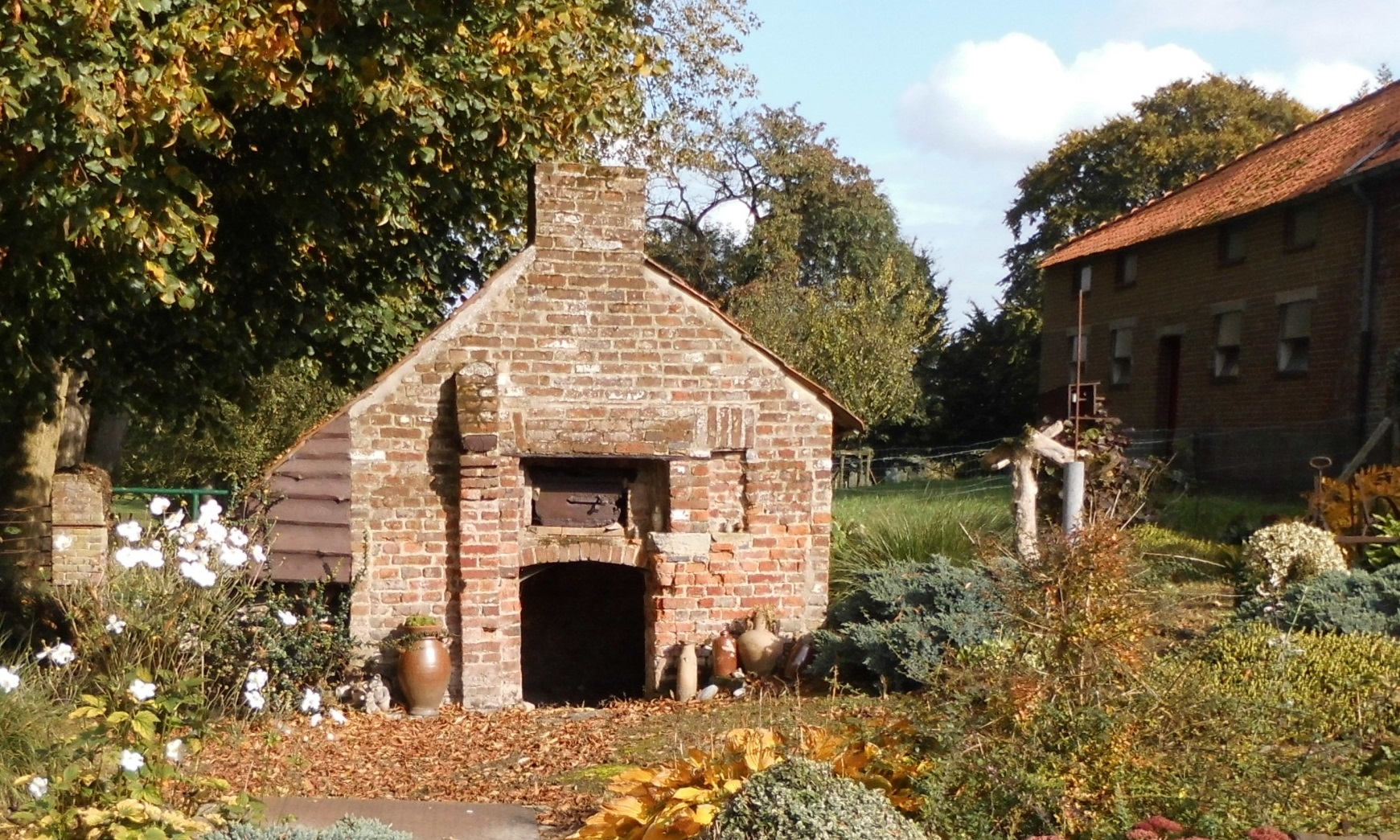
Oven Hellenhoek
