= Mauro De Pellegrini =

Italian cyclist

Personal information
- Born: 10 October 1955 (age 71) Castelnovo di Sotto, Italy

Cycling career
- Sport: Cycling

Mauro De Pellegrini (born 10 October 1955) is an Italian former cyclist. He competed in the team time trial event at the 1980 Summer Olympics.
