= František Trkal =

Czech cyclist

Personal information
- Born: 10 April 1970 (age 56) Litomyšl, Czechoslovakia

Cycling career
- Sport: Cycling

František Trkal (born 10 April 1970) is a Czech former cyclist. He competed in two events at the 1992 Summer Olympics.

== Major results ==
1988
1st Overall Course de la Paix Juniors
1989
1st Stage 5 Bayern Rundfahrt
1991
10th Overall Peace Race
1993
2nd Overall Peace Race

1st Stages 3 & 5

1994
2nd Overall Tour du Vaucluse
3rd Overall Peace Race

1st Stage 1

1995
1st Overall Okolo Slovenska
5th Overall Peace Race
1996
1st Stage 6 Peace Race
1st Stage 2 International Tour of Rhodes
5th HEW Cyclassics
1999
3rd Road race, National Road Championships
2000
4th Overall International Tour of Rhodes

1st Prologue & Stages 2 & 4

2001
1st Overall Okolo Slovenska

1st Stage 2

2002
4th Overall Okolo Slovenska
2004
8th Poreč Trophy
