= 1996 HEW Cyclassics =

Race details
- Dates: 25 August 1996
- Stages: 1
- Distance: 160 km (99.42 mi)
- Winning time: 3h 33' 18"

Results
| | Winner | Rossano Brasi (ITA) |
| | Second | Bert Dietz (GER) |
| | Third | Steffen Rein (GER) |

The 1996 HEW Cyclassics was the inaugural edition of the HEW Cyclassics cycle race and was held on 25 August 1996. The race started and finished in Hamburg. The race was won by Rossano Brasi.

== General classification ==
Final general classification

| Rank | Rider | Time |
|---|---|---|
| 1 | Rossano Brasi (ITA) | 3h 33' 18" |
| 2 | Bert Dietz (GER) | + 13" |
| 3 | Steffen Rein (GER) | + 54" |
| 4 | Steven de Jongh (NED) | + 54" |
| 5 | František Trkal (CZE) | + 54" |
| 6 | Bart Leysen (BEL) | + 54" |
| 7 | Igor Zhuchlantsev (UKR) | + 54" |
| 8 | Mark Claussmeyer (GER) | + 54" |
| 9 | Mirko Crepaldi (ITA) | + 54" |
| 10 | Jason Phillips (AUS) | + 54" |
