= Fritz Joost =

Swiss cyclist

Personal information
- Born: 14 July 1954 (age 72)

Cycling career
- Sport: Cycling

Fritz Joost (born 14 July 1954) is a Swiss former cyclist. He competed in the team time trial event at the 1980 Summer Olympics.
