= Isilkulsky District =

Isilkulsky District Исилькульский район (Russian)
- District
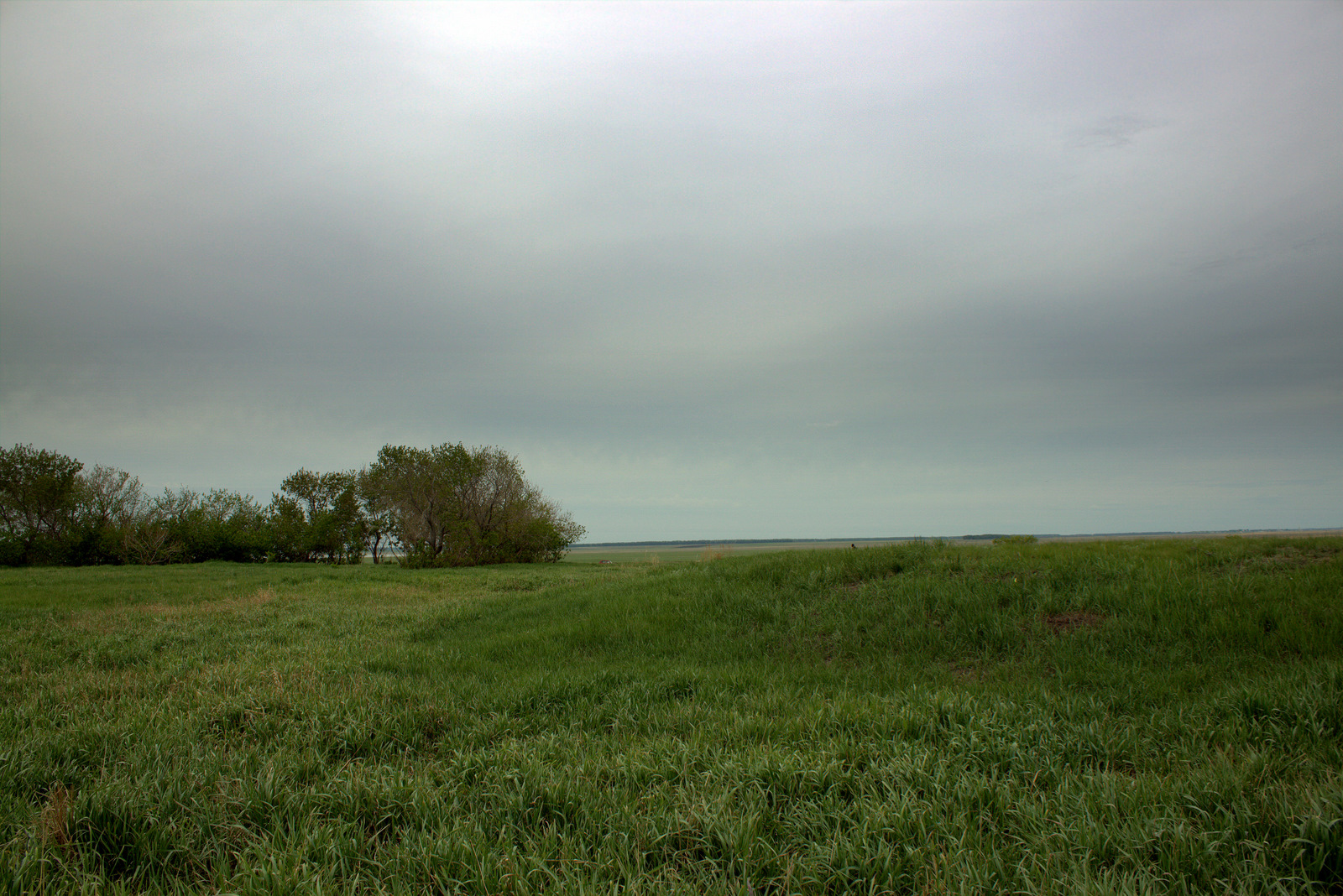
- Losev Redoubt, on the Tobol-Ishim Line, Isilkulsky District

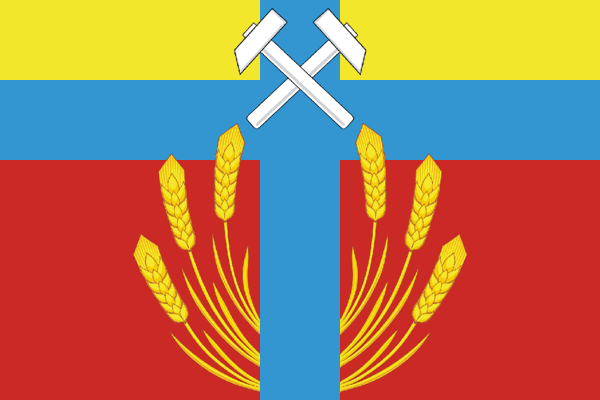
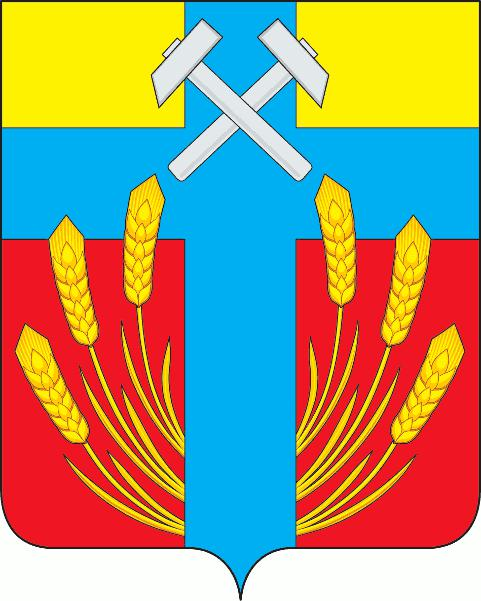
- Flag Coat of arms
- Location of Isilkulsky District in Omsk Oblast
- Coordinates: 54°54′32″N 71°15′38″E
- Country: Russia
- Federal subject: Omsk Oblast
- Administrative center: Isilkul

Area
  - Total: 2,800 km^{2} (1,100 sq mi)

Population (2010 Census)
  - Total: 18,942
  - Density: 6.8/km^{2} (18/sq mi)
  - Urban: 0%
  - Rural: 100%

Administrative structure
  - Administrative divisions: 10 rural okrug
  - Inhabited localities: 50 rural localities

Municipal structure
  - Municipally incorporated as: Isilkulsky Municipal District
  - Municipal divisions: 1 urban settlements, 10 rural settlements
- Time zone: UTC+6 (MSK+3)
- OKTMO ID: 52615000
- Website: http://isilk.omskportal.ru/

Isilkulsky District (Russian: Исильку́льский райо́н; Kazakh: Есілкөл ауданы, Esilkól aýdany) is an administrative and municipal district (raion), one of the thirty-two in Omsk Oblast, Russia. It is located in the southwest of the oblast. The area of the district is 2,800 square kilometers (1,100 sq mi). Its administrative center is the town of Isilkul (which is not administratively a part of the district). Population: 18,942 (2010 Census); 22,216 (2002 census); 22,691 (1989 Soviet census).

== Administrative and municipal status ==
Within the framework of administrative divisions, Isilkulsky District is one of the thirty-two in the oblast. The town of Isilkul serves as its administrative center, despite being incorporated separately as a town of oblast significance—an administrative unit with the status equal to that of the districts.

As a municipal division, the district is incorporated as Isilkulsky Municipal District, with the town of oblast significance of Isilkul being incorporated within it as Isilkul Urban Settlement.

== Notable residents ==
- Georgi Vyun (1944–2008), football player and coach, born in Solntsevka
