= Steve Jones (cyclist) =

British cyclist (born 1957)

Personal information
- Born: 4 December 1957 (age 68) Birmingham, England

Cycling career
- Sport: Cycling

Steve Jones (born 4 December 1957) is a British former cyclist. He competed in the team time trial event at the 1980 Summer Olympics.
