= Brňany =

- Municipality
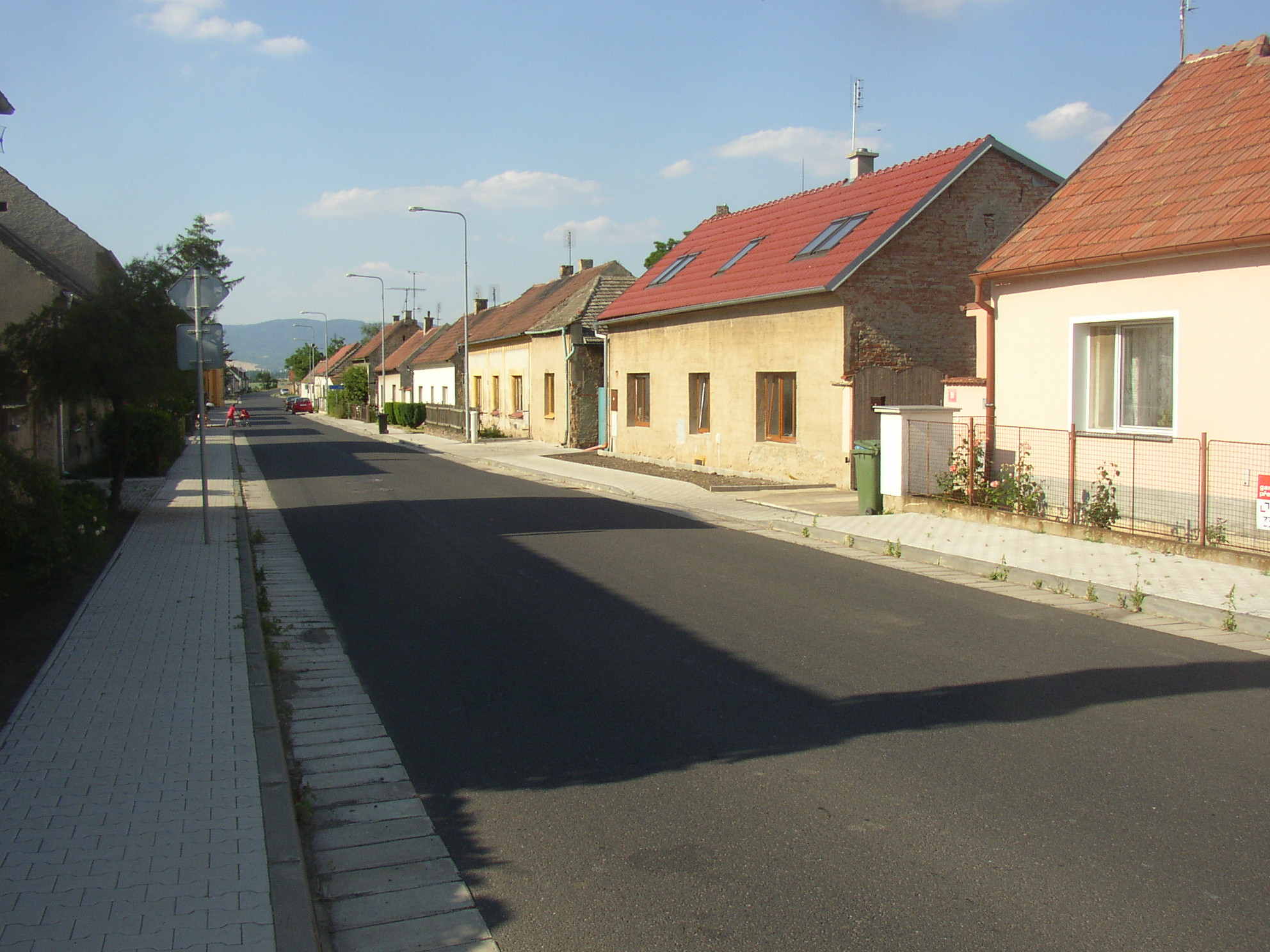
- Main street

- Flag Coat of arms

- Location in the Czech Republic
- Coordinates: 50°28′52″N 14°8′31″E
- Country: Czech Republic
- Region: Ústí nad Labem
- District: Litoměřice
- First mentioned: 1057

Area
  - Total: 5.64 km^{2} (2.18 sq mi)
- Elevation: 151 m (495 ft)

Population (2026-01-01)
  - Total: 471
  - Density: 83.5/km^{2} (216/sq mi)
- Time zone: UTC+1 (CET)
  - Summer (DST): UTC+2 (CEST)
- Postal code: 412 01
- Website: www.brnany.cz

Brňany is a municipality and village in Litoměřice District in the Ústí nad Labem Region of the Czech Republic. It has about 500 inhabitants.

Brňany lies approximately 7 kilometres (4 mi) south of Litoměřice, 21 km (13 mi) south of Ústí nad Labem, and 49 km (30 mi) north-west of Prague.

== Demographics ==
Historical population
Year	Pop.	±%
1869	262	—
1880	401	+53.1%
1890	491	+22.4%
1900	572	+16.5%
1910	672	+17.5%
1921	637	−5.2%
1930	738	+15.9%
1950	566	−23.3%
1961	648	+14.5%
1970	552	−14.8%
1980	488	−11.6%
1991	431	−11.7%
2001	409	−5.1%
2011	409	+0.0%
2021	436	+6.6%
Source: Censuses

== Notable people ==
- Václav Toman (1896–1962), painter
