= Toussaint Fouda =

Cameroonian cyclist (1958–2020)

Personal information
- Born: 14 July 1958
- Died: 12 April 2020 (aged 61) Mbalmayo, Cameroon

Cycling career
- Sport: Cycling

Toussaint Fouda (1 November 1958 – 12 April 2020) was a Cameroonian cyclist. He competed in the team time trial event at the 1980 Summer Olympics.
