= Rossano Brasi =

Italian cyclist

Personal information
- Born: 3 June 1972 (age 54) Bergamo, Italy
- Height: 1.80 m (5 ft 11 in)
- Weight: 70 kg (154 lb; 11 st 0 lb)

Cycling career
- Sport: Cycling
- Current team: Retired
- Disciplines: Road; Track
- Role: Rider

Professional teams
- 1994–2000: Team Polti–Vaporetto
- 2001–2002: De Nardi

Major wins
- World Team time trial Championships (1993); HEW Cyclassics (1996); Scheldeprijs (1995

Rossano Brasi (born 3 June 1972) is an Italian former professional racing cyclist. He competed in the team pursuit at the 1992 Summer Olympics. He was professional from 1995 to 2002 with the teams Polti and De Nardi.

== Major results ==
1989
1st Team time trial, UCI Junior Road World Championships (with Andrea Peron, Davide Rebellin & Cristian Salvato)
1990
2nd Team time trial, UCI Junior Road World Championships
1992
1st Stage 10 Settimana Ciclistica Lombarda
1993
1st Team time trial, UCI Road World Championships (with Gianfranco Contri, Cristian Salvato & Rosario Fina)
1994
3rd Time trial, National Road Championships
3rd Overall Reading Classic
1995
1st Scheldeprijs
1996
1st HEW Cyclassics
1999
2nd GP d'Europe

=== Grand Tour general classification results timeline ===
Grand Tour	1995	1996	1997	1998	1999	2000
Giro d'Italia	—	—	91	—	—	—
Tour de France	102	97	130	82	127	DSQ
Vuelta a España	—	—	—	—	86	—

Legend
—	Did not compete
DNF	Did not finish
DSQ	Disqualified
