= Sandy Martens =

Belgian footballer

Personal information
- Date of birth: 23 December 1972 (age 53)
- Place of birth: Opbrakel, East Flanders, Belgium
- Height: 1.91 m (6 ft 3 in)
- Position: Forward

Youth career
- 1981–1993: Olsa Brakel

Senior career*
Years	Team	Apps	(Gls)
1991–1994	Olsa Brakel	30	(18)
1994–1999	Gent	143	(39)
1999–2003	Club Brugge	130	(34)
2004–2007	Gent	49	(4)
2007–2008	KSK Beveren	26	(5)
2008–2011	KSV Oudenaarde	24	(6)
2012–2013	KVV Windeke		

International career
1999–2003	Belgium	11	(3)

Managerial career
- 2012: Gent (youth)
- 2012–2013: KVV Windeke (playing coach)
- * Club domestic league appearances and goals

Sandy Martens (born 23 December 1972) is a Belgian former professional footballer who played as a forward spent most of his career with Gent and Club Brugge. He is a former Belgium international, with a record of 3 goals in 11 games.

== Career ==
Born in Opbrakel, East Flanders, Martens started off his career with Olsa Brakel, a club in Belgium's fourth division. In 1993, he moved to AA Gent (First Division, Jupiler League). In his first match, at home against SK Beveren, he scored immediately, making him a crowd's favourite. He remained one of the leading players in Gent until 1999.

In 1999 Martens moved to Club Brugge. It was also the period in which he turned Belgian international. He debuted for the Belgium national team on 27 March 1999 against Bulgaria. His last international appearance was against Croatia in August 2003.

== Career statistics ==
Appearances and goals by club, season and competition
Club	Season	League			Belgian Cup		Continental		Total	
Club	Season	Division	Apps	Goals	Apps	Goals	Apps	Goals	Apps	Goals
Olsa Brakel	1993–94		30	18						
Gent	1994–95	Belgian First Division	31	10						
Gent	1995–96	Belgian First Division	32	9						
Gent	1996–97	Belgian First Division	30	6						
Gent	1997–98	Belgian First Division	22	6						
Gent	1998–99	Belgian First Division	28	8						
Club Brugge	1999–2000	Belgian First Division	29	4						
Club Brugge	2000–01	Belgian First Division	31	8						
Club Brugge	2001–02	Belgian First Division	26	5						
Club Brugge	2002–03	Belgian First Division	30	14						
Club Brugge	2003–04	Belgian First Division	15	2						
Gent	2003–04	Belgian First Division	11	0						
Gent	2004–05	Belgian First Division	3	1						
Gent	2005–06	Belgian First Division	28	2						
Gent	2006–07	Belgian First Division	7	1						
Beveren	2007–08	Belgian Second Division	26	5						
Beveren	2008–09	Belgian Second Division								
Career total			379	99						

== Honours ==
Club Brugge

- Belgian First Division A: 2002–03
- Belgian Cup: 2001–02
- Belgian Super Cup: 2002
