= Isilkul =

Town in Omsk Oblast, Russia

Isilkul Исилькуль
- Town
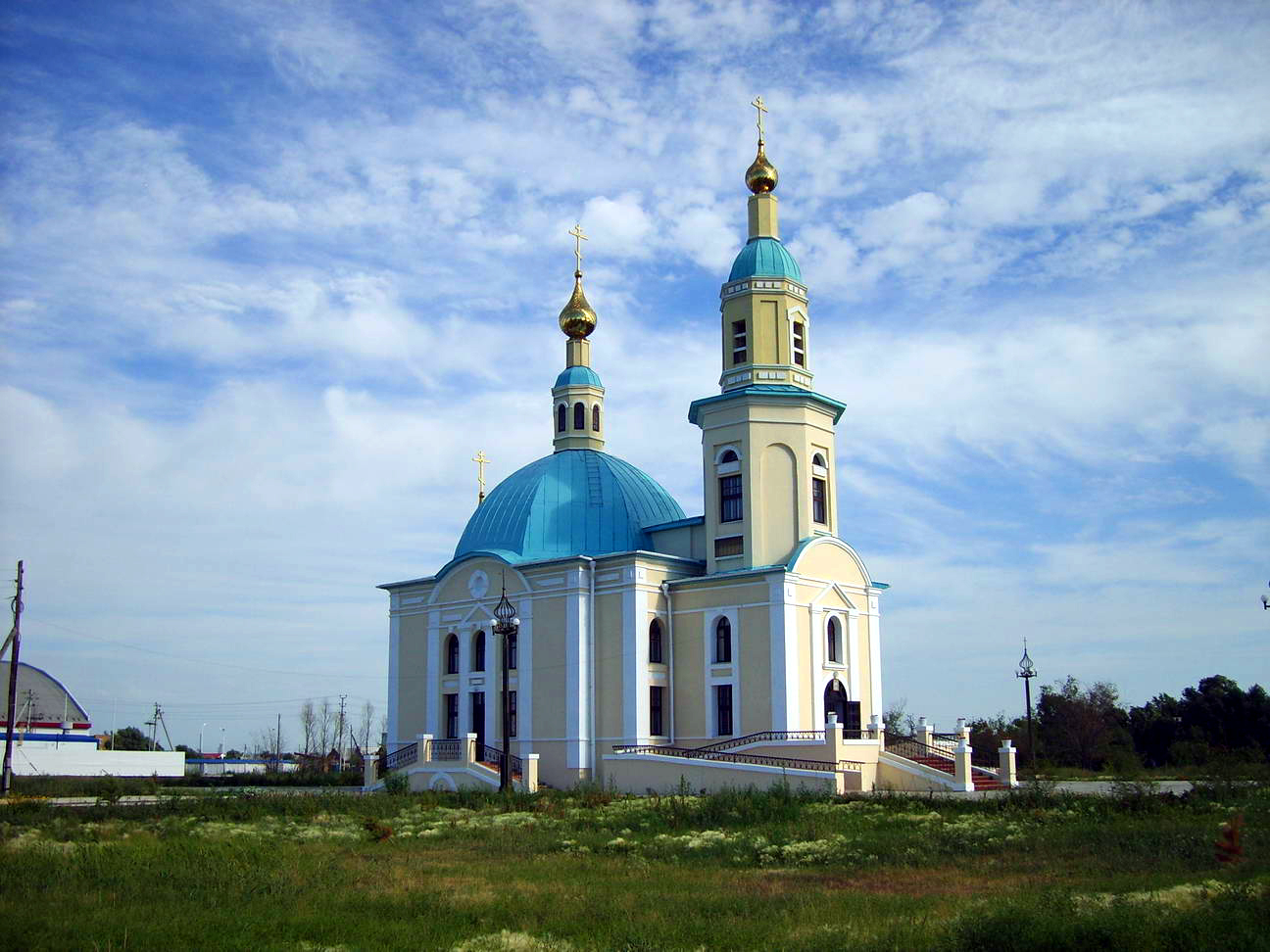
- Church in Isilkul

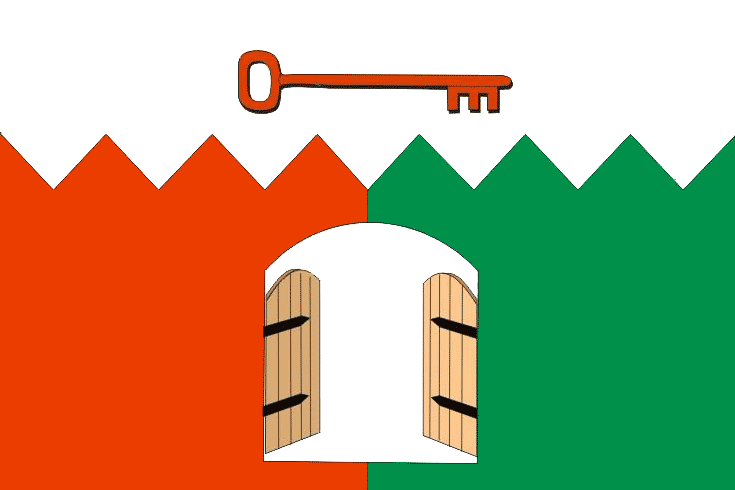
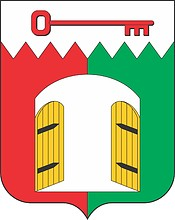
- Flag Coat of arms
- Interactive map of Isilkul
- Location of Isilkul Isilkul (Omsk Oblast)
- Coordinates: 54°57′N 71°15′E
- Country: Russia
- Federal subject: Omsk Oblast
- Founded: 1895

Government
  - Head of Administration: Vladimir Suslenko
- Elevation: 120 m (390 ft)

Population (2010 Census)
  - Total: 24,482
  - Estimate (2023): 20,050 (−18.1%)

Administrative status
  - Subordinated to: town of oblast significance of Isilkul
  - Capital of: Isilkulsky District, town of oblast significance of Isilkul

Municipal status
  - Municipal district: Isilkulsky Municipal District
  - Urban settlement: Isilkul Urban Settlement
  - Capital of: Isilkulsky Municipal District, Isilkul Urban Settlement
- Time zone: UTC+6 (MSK+3)
- Postal codes: 646020, 646023–646025
- OKTMO ID: 52615101001

Isilkul (Russian: Исильку́ль; Kazakh: Есілкөл, romanized: Esılköl) is a town in Omsk Oblast, Russia, located 120 kilometers (75 mi) west of Omsk, the administrative center of the oblast. Population: 24,482 (2010 census); 26,549 (2002 census); 26,430 (1989 Soviet census).

== Etymology ==
The name of the town is Kazakh, with "Esil" being the Kazakh name for the Ishim River and "köl" meaning 'lake'.

== Administrative and municipal status ==
Within the framework of administrative divisions, Isilkul serves as the administrative center of Isilkulsky District, even though it is not a part of it. As an administrative division, it is incorporated separately as the town of oblast significance of Isilkul—an administrative unit with the status equal to that of the districts. As a municipal division, the town of oblast significance of Isilkul is incorporated within Isilkusky Municipal District as Isilkul Urban Settlement.

== Transportation ==
The town is a transfer point on the southern branch of the Trans-Siberian Railway between the Western Siberian and Sverdlovsk railroads.

== Notable people ==
- Igor Albin (born 1966), politician
- Sergey Shelpakov (born 1956), Soviet Olympic cyclist
