= 1982 UCI Road World Championships =

- Venue: Goodwood, United Kingdom
- Date: 4-5 September 1982
- Coordinates: 50°51′34″N 0°45′33″W
- Events: 4

The 1982 UCI Road World Championships took place between 4–5 September 1982 at the Goodwood Circuit in Chichester, Great Britain.

In the same period, the 1982 UCI Track Cycling World Championships were organized in Leicester.

== Results ==
Race:	Gold:	Time	Silver:	Time	Bronze :	Time
Men
Men's road race	Giuseppe Saronni; Italy	6.42'22"	Greg LeMond; United States	+ 5"	Sean Kelly; Ireland	+ 10"
Amateurs' road race	Bernd Drogan; East Germany	4.17'48"	Francis Vermaelen; Belgium	+ 8"	Jurg Bruggmann; Switzerland	+ 8"
Team time trial	Netherlands; Maarten Ducrot; Gerard Schipper; Gerrit Solleveld; Frits Van Bindsbergen	2.14'19"	Switzerland; Alfred Achermann; Daniel Heggli; Richard Trinkler; Urs Zimmermann	+ 27"	Soviet Union; Youri Kashirin; Oleg Logvin; Sergej Voronin; Oleg Tchugda	+ 34"
Women
Women's road race	Mandy Jones; Great Britain	1.31'00"	Maria Canins; Italy	+ 10"	Gerda Sierens; Belgium	+ 10"

== Medal table ==
Rank	Nation	Gold	Silver	Bronze	Total
1	Italy (ITA)	1	1	0	2
2	East Germany (DDR)	1	0	0	1
2	Great Britain (GBR)	1	0	0	1
2	Netherlands (NED)	1	0	0	1
5	Belgium (BEL)	0	1	1	2
5	Switzerland (SUI)	0	1	1	2
7	United States (USA)	0	1	0	1
8	Ireland (IRL)	0	0	1	1
8	Soviet Union (URS)	0	0	1	1
Totals (9 entries)		4	4	4	12
