= Per Kærsgaard Laursen =

Danish cyclist

Personal information
- Born: 7 November 1955 (age 70) Copenhagen, Denmark

Cycling career
- Sport: Cycling

Per Kærsgaard Laursen (born 7 November 1955) is a Danish former cyclist. He competed in the team time trial event at the 1980 Summer Olympics.
