= Bojan Udovič =

Slovene cyclist

Personal information
- Born: 22 July 1957 Kranj, PR Slovenia, FPR Yugoslavia
- Died: 11 July 2015 (aged 57) Medvedjek, Slovenia

Cycling career
- Sport: Cycling

Bojan Udovič (22 July 1957 – 11 July 2015) was a Slovene cyclist. He competed in the individual road race and team time trial events at the 1980 Summer Olympics, where three of the four members of the Yugoslav cycling team were Slovenes. Together with a fellow cyclist, Udovič was killed by a drunk driver near Medvedjek on 11 July 2015 while cycling.
