= Theo Hogervorst =

Dutch cyclist

Personal information
- Full name: Theodorus "Theo" Hogervorst
- Born: 10 January 1956 Pijnacker, Netherlands
- Height: 191 cm (6 ft 3 in)
- Weight: 82 kg (181 lb)

Cycling career
- Sport: Cycling
- Discipline: road cycling

Theodorus "Theo" Hogervorst (born 10 January 1956 in Pijnacker) is a road cyclist from the Netherlands. He competed in the men's team time trial at the 1980 Summer Olympics, finishing 15th. He won the Ronde van Noord-Holland in 1980.

== See also ==
- List of Dutch Olympic cyclists
