= Venelin Khubenov =

Bulgarian cyclist

Personal information
- Born: 19 April 1959 (age 67)

Cycling career
- Sport: Cycling

Venelin Khubenov (Bulgarian: Венелин Хубенов, born 19 April 1959) is a Bulgarian former cyclist. He competed in the team time trial event at the 1980 Summer Olympics.
