= Davis Pereira =

Brazilian cyclist

Personal information
- Born: 21 January 1958 (age 68)

Cycling career
- Sport: Cycling

Davis Pereira (born 21 January 1958) is a Brazilian former cyclist. He competed in the individual road race event at the 1980 Summer Olympics.
