= Andon Petrov =

Bulgarian cyclist

Personal information
- Born: 29 April 1955 (age 71)

Cycling career
- Sport: Cycling

Andon Petrov (Bulgarian: Андон Петров, born 29 April 1955) is a Bulgarian former cyclist. He competed in the individual road race event at the 1980 Summer Olympics, but did not finish.
