= Ronald Van Avermaet =

Belgian cyclist

Personal information
- Born: 5 January 1959 (age 67) Hamme, Belgium

Cycling career
- Sport: Cycling

Ronald Van Avermaet (born 5 January 1959) is a Belgian former cyclist. He competed in the individual road race event at the 1980 Summer Olympics.

He is the father of Greg Van Avermaet, who won the men's road race at the 2016 Summer Olympics.
