= Thüringen Rundfahrt der U23 =

Race details
- Date: Mid May
- Region: Thuringia, Germany
- English name: Tour of Thuringia
- Local name(s): Thüringen Rundfahrt
- Discipline: Road
- Competition: UCI Europe Tour
- Type: Stage race
- Web site: www.thueringenrundfahrt.com

History
- First edition: 1976
- Editions: 38
- Final edition: 2013
- First winner: Joachim Vogel (GER)
- Most wins: Uwe Ampler (GER) (3 wins)
- Final winner: Dylan van Baarle (NED)

Thüringen Rundfahrt der U23 was a bicycle road race held annually in the German state of Thuringia. It was a stage race reserved to athletes under the age of 23. Since 2005, it was organized as a 2.2U event on the UCI Europe Tour. After the 2013 edition, it was discontinued.

== Winners ==
Year	Country	Rider	Team
1976	West Germany	Joachim Vogel	
1977	West Germany	Andreas Neuer	
1978	East Germany	Norbert Dürpisch	
1979	East Germany	Hans-Joachim Hartnick	
1980	East Germany	Andreas Petermann	
1981	East Germany	Andreas Petermann	
1982	West Germany	Uwe Raab	
1983	East Germany	Mario Hernig	
1984	East Germany	Matthias Lendt	
1985	West Germany	Uwe Ampler	
1986	West Germany	Uwe Ampler	
1987	West Germany	Uwe Ampler	
1988	West Germany	Olaf Ludwig	
1989	West Germany	Steffen Rein	
1990	Germany	Bert Dietz	
1991	No race		
1992	Germany	Bert Dietz	
1993	Germany	Ralf Schmidt	
1994	Germany	Steffen Uslar	
1995	Germany	Steffen Blochwitz	
1996	Germany	Michael Schlickum	
1997	Germany	Timo Scholz	
1998	Germany	Lars Teutenberg	
1999	Germany	Stephan Schreck	
2000	Germany	Patrik Sinkewitz	
2001	Austria	Christian Pfannberger	Austria (national team)
2002	Netherlands	Pieter Weening	Rabobank GS3
2003	Netherlands	Joost Posthuma	Rabobank GS3
2004	Netherlands	Thomas Dekker	Rabobank GS3
2005	Netherlands	Kai Reus	Rabobank Continental Team
2006	Germany	Tony Martin	Thüringer Energie Team
2007	Switzerland	Mathias Frank	Switzerland (national team)
2008	Germany	Patrick Gretsch	Thüringer Energie Team
2009	Austria	Stefan Denifl	Austria (national team)
2010	Germany	John Degenkolb	Thüringer Energie Team
2011	Netherlands	Wilco Kelderman	Rabobank Continental Team
2012	Australia	Rohan Dennis	Team Jayco–AIS
2013	Netherlands	Dylan van Baarle	Rabobank Development Team

== See also ==
- Thüringen Rundfahrt der Frauen
