= Ladislav Ferebauer =

Czech cyclist

Personal information
- Born: 25 October 1957 (age 68) České Budějovice, Czechoslovakia
- Height: 152 cm (5 ft 0 in)

Cycling career
- Sport: Cycling

Ladislav Ferebauer (born 25 October 1957) is a former Czechoslovak cyclist. He competed in the individual road race event at the 1980 Summer Olympics.
