= Håkan Karlsson (cyclist) =

Swedish cyclist

Personal information
- Born: 30 July 1958 (age 68) Mellerud, Sweden

Cycling career
- Sport: Cycling

Håkan Karlsson (born 30 July 1958) is a Swedish former cyclist. He competed in the team time trial event at the 1980 Summer Olympics.
