= Oleg Logvin =

Soviet cyclist

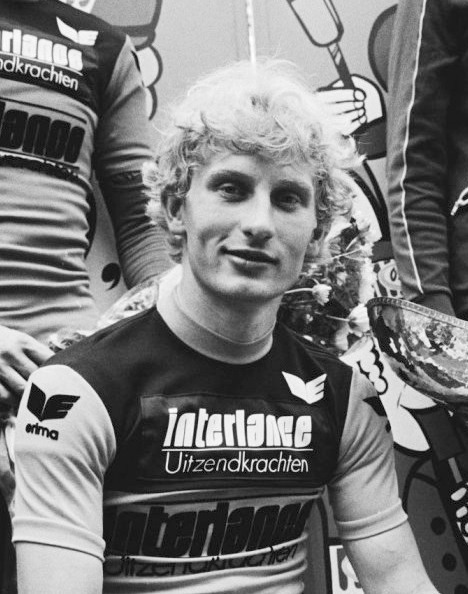
- Oleg Logvin in 1980

Personal information
- Born: 23 May 1959 (age 67) Minsk, Belarusian SSR
- Height: 1.83 m (6 ft 0 in)
- Weight: 78 kg (172 lb)

Cycling career
- Sport: Cycling
Medal record
Representing the Soviet Union
Olympic Games
Gold medal – first place	1980 Moscow	Team time trial
World Championships
Silver medal – second place	1981 Prague	Team time trial
Bronze medal – third place	1982 Goodwood	Team time trial

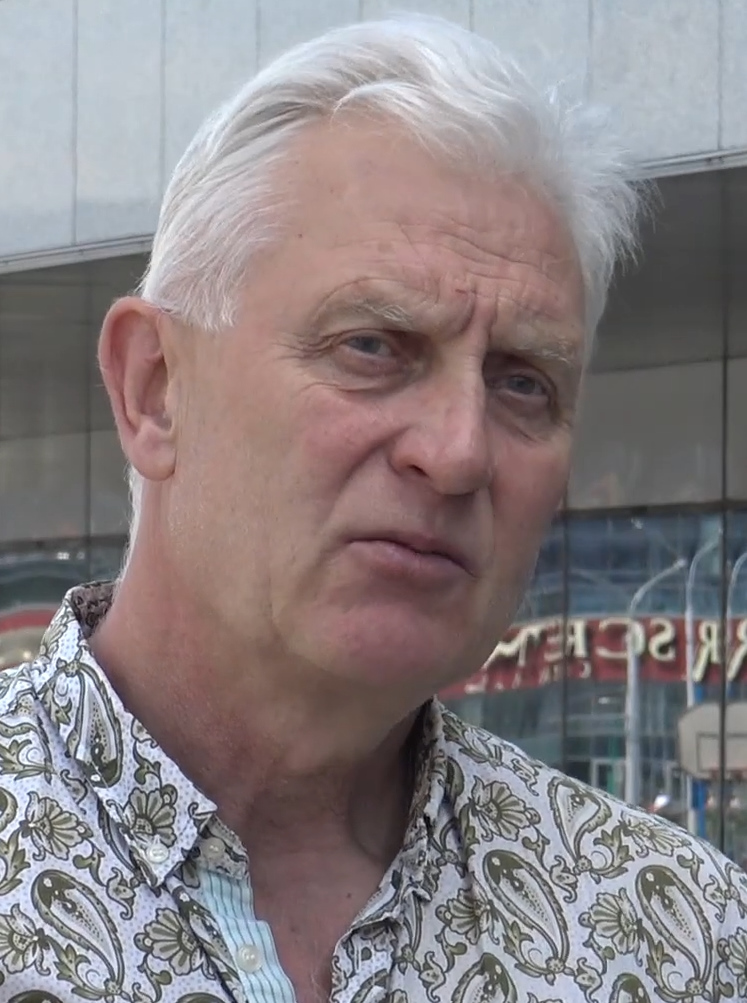
Logvin in 2019

Oleg Nikolayevich Logvin (Russian: Олег Николаевич Логвин; born 23 May 1959) is a retired Soviet cyclist who specialized in road racing. He was part of the Soviet team that won the time trial event at the 1980 Summer Olympics. He also won a silver and a bronze medal in the team time trial at the 1981 and 1982 UCI Road World Championships.

In 1980 he won two stages and the overall competition at the Olympia's Tour. Two years later he finished second in the Milk Race, winning two stages in the process. He retired in 1986 to pursue a career in criminal law, but reconsidered and resumed training in 1987. Next year he finished third in the national championships, but was not selected for the Olympic team. He proceeded to compete for the first Soviet professional cycling team Alfa Lum, and later for Portuguese clubs, winning races at the Circuito de Alenquer in 1991 and in Porto in 1992.
