= Patrick du Chau =

Belgian cyclist

Personal information
- Born: 9 February 1959 (age 67) Opbrakel, Belgium

Cycling career
- Sport: Cycling

Patrick du Chau (born 9 February 1959) is a Belgian former cyclist. He competed and finished sixteenth in the 100 kilometer team time trial event at the 1980 Summer Olympics in Moscow, Russia.
