= 1991 E3 Prijs Vlaanderen =

1991 E3 Harelbeke
Race details
- Dates: 30 March 1991
- Stages: 1
- Distance: 203 km (126 mi)
- Winning time: 5h 12' 00"

Results
	Winner	Olaf Ludwig (GER)	(Panasonic–Sportlife)
	Second	Phil Anderson (AUS)	(Motorola)
	Third	Uwe Raab (GER)	(PDM–Concorde–Ultima)

The 1991 E3 Harelbeke was the 34th edition of the E3 Harelbeke cycle race and was held on 30 March 1991. The race started and finished in Harelbeke. The race was won by Olaf Ludwig of the Panasonic team.

== General classification ==
Final general classification

Rank	Rider	Team	Time
1	Olaf Ludwig (GER)	Panasonic–Sportlife	5h 12' 00"
2	Phil Anderson (AUS)	Motorola	+ 0"
3	Uwe Raab (GER)	PDM–Concorde–Ultima	+ 1"
4	Hendrik Redant (BEL)	Lotto	+ 1"
5	Marcel Wüst (GER)	RMO	+ 1"
6	Remig Stumpf (GER)	Histor–Sigma	+ 1"
7	Eddy Planckaert (BEL)	Panasonic–Sportlife	+ 1"
8	Mario Cipollini (ITA)	Del Tongo–MG Boys	+ 1"
9	Eddy Schurer (NED)	TVM–Sanyo	+ 1"
10	Wilfried Nelissen (BEL)	Weinmann–Eddy Merckx	+ 1"
