= Alipi Kostadinov =

Personal information
- Born: 16 April 1955 (age 71) Petrovice, Czechoslovakia
- Height: 1.78 m (5 ft 10 in)
- Weight: 76 kg (168 lb)

Cycling career
- Sport: Cycling
Medal record
Men's cycling
Representing Czechoslovakia
Olympic Games
Bronze medal – third place	1980 Moscow	Team time trial
World Championships
Bronze medal – third place	1981 Prague	Team time trial

Alipi Kostadinov (born 16 April 1955) is a retired cyclist from Czechoslovakia who specialized in road racing. He won a bronze medal in the 100 km time trial at the 1980 Summer Olympics and at the 1981 UCI Road World Championships.

He competed in several major road races between 1976 and 1983, and won one stage at the Tour of Austria in 1976 and at the race of Lidice in 1982.
