= Jan Jankiewicz =

Polish cyclist (born 1955)

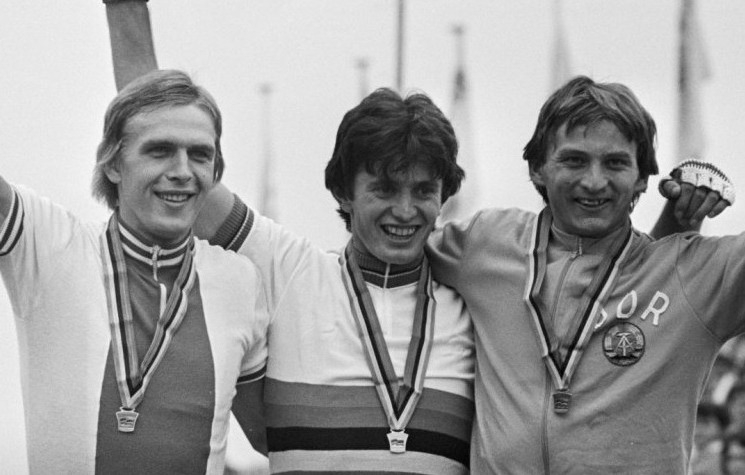
- Jan Jankiewicz, Gianni Giacomini and Bernd Drogan at the 1979 UCI Road World Championships

Personal information
- Born: 17 September 1955 (age 71) Przedborowa, Poland
- Height: 1.79 m (5 ft 10 in)
- Weight: 68 kg (150 lb)

Cycling career
- Sport: Cycling
- Discipline: Road
- Role: Rider

Professional team
- Legia Warszawa/RŁKS Wrocław
Medal record
Representing Poland
World Championships
Silver medal – second place	1979 Valkenburg	Amateur road race
Silver medal – second place	1979 Valkenburg	Team time trial

Jan Jankiewicz (born 17 September 1955) is a retired Polish cyclist. In 1979 he won two silver medals in the road race at the World Cycling Championships, individually and with the Polish team. He competed at the 1976 and 1980 Summer Olympics in four events in total. In 1976, he finished in tenth and fifth place in the 4000 m pursuit, individually and with the Polish team, respectively. In 1980, he was fourth in the road race, but failed to reach the finish in the 100 km time trial.

Jankiewicz had his best racing years between 1978 and 1980. Besides his two silver medals at the world championships, he won six stages of the Tour de Pologne, three in 1978 and three in 1979; in 1979, he also won one stage of the Peace Race. In 1980, he won three stages of the Milk Race and one stage of the Tour de Pologne.

He is married to Marzena Jankiewicz. They have two daughters, Patrycja and Natalia, and live in Wrocław, where Jan works as an entrepreneur.
