= Miloš Hrazdíra =

Czech cyclist

Personal information
- Born: 23 November 1945 Žďárná, Moravia, Czechoslovakia
- Died: 25 January 1990 (aged 44) Brno, Moravia, Czechoslovakia
- Height: 1.79 m (5 ft 10 in)
- Weight: 72 kg (159 lb)

Sport
- Sport: Cycling
- Club: Favorit Brno, Dukla Brno

Miloš "Milan" Hrazdíra ([ˈmɪloʃ ˈɦrazɟiːra]; 23 November 1945 – 25 January 1990) was a Czech cyclist. He competed at the 1972 Summer Olympics in the 100 km team time trial and finished in 13th place. He was the first cyclist to win the Tour de Slovaquie three times, in 1967, 1968 and 1973, a record repeated only by Jiří Škoda in 1985. In 1982 he became the only cyclist in Czech history to win three national titles in one year, in the road race and individual and team time trial. He also won the 1968 Rás Tailteann.

He married Eva Hrazdíra (born 1949). They had a daughter Eva (born 1969) and two sons, Milan (born 1973) and Michal (born 1977). Both sons became cyclists, and Michal competed at the 2004 Olympics.

The street Hrazdírova in the Brno-Bosonohy area of Brno is named after him.
