= David Scarfe =

Australian cyclist

Personal information
- Born: 26 November 1960 (age 65)

Cycling career
- Sport: Cycling

David Scarfe (born 26 November 1960) is an Australian former cyclist. He competed in the team time trial event at the 1980 Summer Olympics.
