= Tadeusz Wojtas =

Polish cyclist

Personal information
- Born: 8 February 1955 (age 71) Pszczółki, Poland

Cycling career
- Sport: Cycling

Tadeusz Wojtas (born 8 February 1955) is a Polish former cyclist. He competed in the individual road race event at the 1980 Summer Olympics.
