= Andreas Petermann =

German cyclist (born 1957)

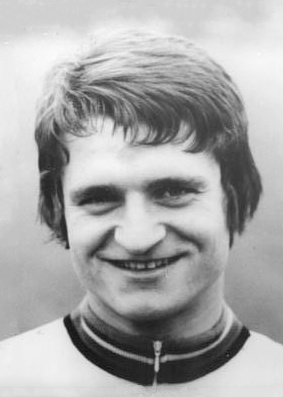
- Andreas Petermann in 1977

Personal information
- Born: 7 June 1957 (age 69) Greiz, East Germany
- Height: 1.86 m (6 ft 1 in)
- Weight: 83 kg (183 lb)

Sport
- Sport: Cycling
- Club: SC DHfK, Leipzig
Medal record
Representing East Germany
World Championships
Gold medal – first place	1979 Valkenburg	Team time trial

Andreas Petermann (born 7 June 1957) is a retired German cyclist. He won a gold medal in the 100 km team time trial at the 1979 UCI Road World Championships. Next year he competed for East Germany at the 1980 Summer Olympics in the individual road race and finished in tenth place.

In 1979, he finished in second place in the Peace Race. He won the Thüringen Rundfahrt der U23 in 1980 and 1981 and the Tour du Maroc in 1983.

After retirement from competitions, he worked as a college lecturer in cycling in Leipzig. Between 1986 and 1994 he was involved in research on training of track cyclists. From 1995 to 2000 he was a head coach of the German Triathlon Union in the areas of performance diagnostics and training analysis. He was also responsible for the junior squad. From 2000 he worked with various professional cycling teams such as Coast, Bianchi and Wiesenhof. Between 2008 and 2011 he was the head coach in track cycling for the German Cycling Federation.
