= Yury Kashirin =

Soviet cyclist

Personal information
- Born: 20 January 1959 (age 67) Liskinsky District, Voronezh Oblast, Russia
- Height: 1.82 m (6 ft 0 in)
- Weight: 78 kg (172 lb)

Cycling career
- Sport: Cycling
Medal record
Representing the Soviet Union
Olympic Games
Gold medal – first place	1980 Moscow	Team time trial
World Championships
Silver medal – second place	1981 Prague	Team time trial
Bronze medal – third place	1982 Goodwood	Team time trial

Yury Alekseyevich Kashirin (Russian: Юрий Алексеевич Каширин; born 20 January 1959) is a retired Soviet cyclist who specialized in road racing. He was part of the Soviet team that won the time trial event at the 1980 Summer Olympics. Individually, he finished in 23rd place in the road race, helping Sergei Sukhoruchenkov and Yury Barinov to win the race. He also won a silver and a bronze medal in the team time trial at the 1981 and 1982 UCI Road World Championships.

Between 1979 and 1984, Kashirin took part in several international competitions, winning the Milk Race in 1979 and 1982 and the Tour de Bretagne Cycliste in 1983. He retired in 1986 and worked as a cycling coach. In 1987, he led the junior and in 1988 the senior Soviet teams. He then worked with the national teams of Egypt and Canada, preparing the Canadian team for three Olympic Games. In 2008, he returned to Russia.
