= Andrei Vedernikov =

Soviet cyclist (1959–2020)

Personal information
- Born: 1 October 1959 Izhevsk, Soviet Union
- Died: 29 February 2020 (aged 60) Izhevsk, Russia
- Height: 1.72 m (5 ft 8 in)
- Weight: 58 kg (128 lb)

Cycling career
- Sport: Cycling
Medal record
Representing the Soviet Union
World Championships
| Gold medal – first place | 1981 Prague | Amateur road race |

Andrei Georgievich Vedernikov (Russian: Андрей Георгиевич Ведерников; 1 October 1959 — 29 February 2020) was a Soviet cyclist. In 1981 he became the first Soviet cyclist to win the individual amateur road race at world championships, and was named the road racer of the year by the Union Cycliste Internationale.

In 1980, he won the Vuelta Mexico Telmex. Next year, he won the Tour de Slovaquie and finished second in the Milk Race.

Vedernikov was married and had a daughter, Lena, and a son, Andrei. His brother Mikhail is also a cyclist.

He died on February 29, 2020, on the territory of one of the health resorts in Izhevsk as a result of a falling tree.

== Major results ==
1979
3rd Overall Okolo Slovenska
1980
2nd Overall Tour of Yugoslavia

1st Stage 7

1981
1st Men's amateur road race, UCI Road World Championships
1st Overall Okolo Slovenska
1st Stage 11 Tour de l'Avenir
1st Stages 2, 6, 8 & 9 Vuelta a Cuba
2nd Overall Milk Race

1st Mountains classification
1st Stage 10

1982
1st Stage 7 Giro Next Gen
2nd Overall Rheinland-Pfalz Rundfahrt

1st Stage 3

1983
1st Prologue Giro Next Gen
1984
3rd Overall USSR Tour
1985
1st Overall USSR Tour
1986
9th Overall Vuelta a Cuba
1989
3rd Overall Okolo Slovenska
1990
1st Stage 3 Ronde de l'Isard
