= Stefan Ciekański =

Polish cyclist

Personal information
- Born: 29 May 1958 (age 68) Łódź, Poland

Cycling career
- Sport: Cycling

Stefan Ciekański (born 29 May 1958) is a Polish former cyclist. He competed in the team time trial event at the 1980 Summer Olympics.
