= Okolo Slovenska =

Road cycling stage race in Slovakia

Tour de Slovakia
- 2026 Okolo Slovenska

Race details
- Date: Middle of September
- Region: Slovakia
- English name: Tour of Slovakia
- Discipline: Road
- Competition: UCI Europe Tour
- Type: Stage race
- Web site: www.okoloslovenska.com

History
- First edition: 1954
- Editions: 70 (as of 2026)
- First winner: Karel Nesl (TCH)
- Most wins: Jiří Škoda (TCH); Miloš Hrazdíra (TCH) (3 wins)
- Most recent: Lennert Van Eetvelt (BEL)

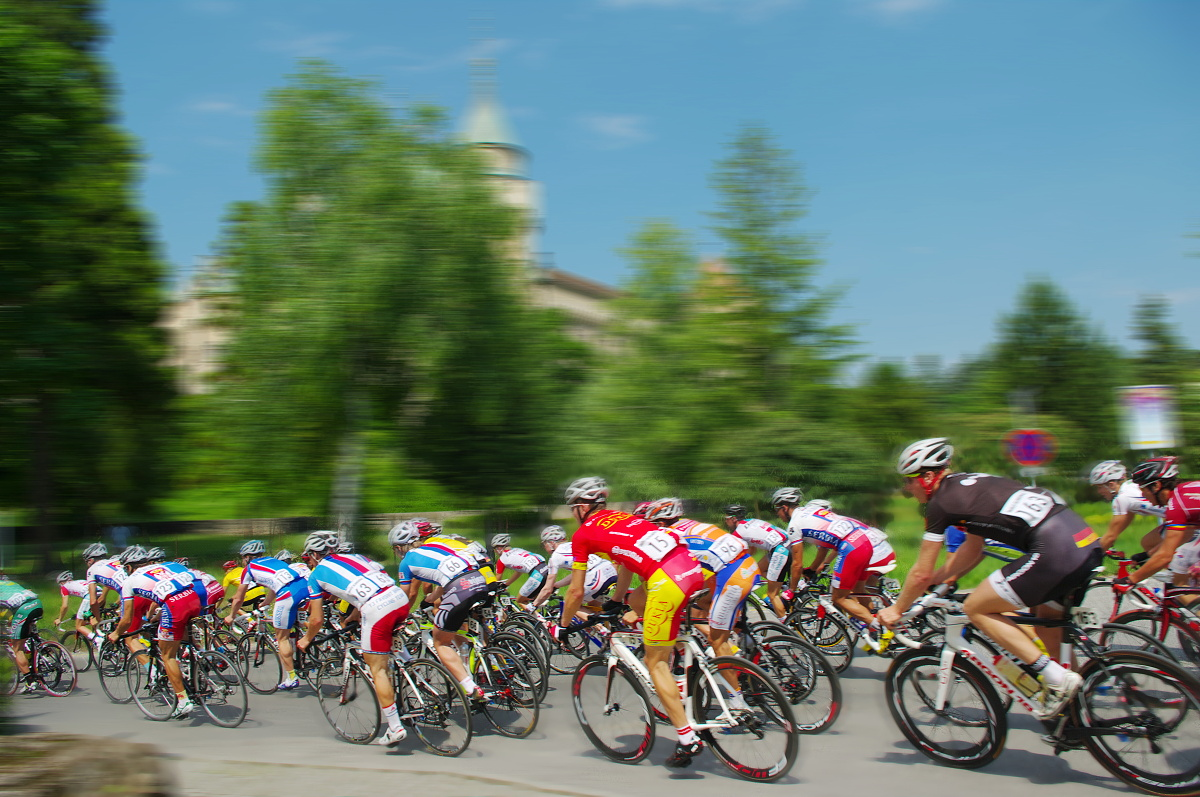
Okolo Slovenska, 2011

Okolo Slovenska (English: Tour of Slovakia; French: Tour de Slovaquie) is an annual road cycling stage race in Slovakia. Founded in 1954, since 2017 it has been rated as a 2.1 event on the UCI Europe Tour. It is a stage race that usually includes five or more stages.

== History ==
Okolo Slovenska started on 19 June 1954, at Stalin square in Bratislava, and included seven stages. The first race was won by Czech cyclist Karel Nesl. The Slovak cyclist Vlastimil Ružička won three of the seven stages of the race.

== Winners ==
| Year | Country | Rider | Team |
|---|---|---|---|
| 1954 | Czechoslovakia | Karel Nesl | |
| 1955 | Czechoslovakia | Jan Veselý | |
| 1956 | Italy | Aurelio Cestari | |
| 1957 | France | Pierre Le Don | |
| 1958 | Czechoslovakia | Walter Renner | |
| 1959 | East Germany | Lothar Höhne | |
| 1960 | Hungary | Antal Megyerdi | |
| 1961– 1963 | No race | | |
| 1964 | Czechoslovakia | Matej Laczo | |
| 1965 | Czechoslovakia | Jiří Háva | |
| 1966 | Czechoslovakia | Pavel Konečný | |
| 1967 | Czechoslovakia | Miloš Hrazdíra | |
| 1968 | Czechoslovakia | Miloš Hrazdíra | |
| 1969 | Czechoslovakia | Břetislav Souček | |
| 1970 | Czechoslovakia | Vlastimil Moravec | |
| 1971 | Czechoslovakia | Jiří Háva | |
| 1972 | Czechoslovakia | Antonin Bartoníček | |
| 1973 | Czechoslovakia | Miloš Hrazdíra | |
| 1974 | Czechoslovakia | Pavol Čambal | |
| 1975 | Czechoslovakia | Josef Dvořák | |
| 1976 | Czechoslovakia | Jiří Škoda | |
| 1977 | Czechoslovakia | Miroslav Sýkora | |
| 1978 | Netherlands | Theo de Rooij | |
| 1979 | Czechoslovakia | Jaroslav Poslušný | |
| 1980 | Czechoslovakia | Jiří Škoda | |
| 1981 | Soviet Union | Andrei Vedernikov | |
| 1982 | Soviet Union | Vladimir Volochin | |
| 1983 | East Germany | Bernd Drogan | |
| 1984 | Czechoslovakia | Miroslav Sýkora | |
| 1985 | Czechoslovakia | Jiří Škoda | |
| 1986 | Czechoslovakia | Václav Toman | |
| 1987 | Soviet Union | Ivan Ivanov | |
| 1988 | Czechoslovakia | Tomáš Sedláček | |
| 1989 | Soviet Union | Pavel Tonkov | |
| 1990 | Czechoslovakia | Miroslav Lipták | |
| 1991 | Germany | Heinrich Trumheller | |
| 1992 | Czechoslovakia | Lubor Tesař | |
| 1993 | Ukraine | Serhiy Honchar | |
| 1994 | Czech Republic | Vladimir Svehlik | |
| 1995 | Czech Republic | František Trkal | |
| 1996 | Slovakia | Ján Valach | |
| 1997 | Czech Republic | Jaromír Purmenský | |
| 1998 | Slovenia | Andrej Hauptman | |
| 1999 | Czech Republic | Ondřej Sosenka | |
| 2000 | Czech Republic | René Andrle | Wüstenrot–ZVVZ |
| 2001 | Czech Republic | František Trkal | PSK–Remerx |
| 2002 | Sweden | Gustav Larsson | Team Crescent CK |
| 2003 | Czech Republic | Ondřej Sosenka | CCC–Polsat |
| 2004 | Poland | Piotr Chmielewski | Action |
| 2005 | Slovakia | Martin Prázdnovský | CK ZP Sport A.S. Podbrezova |
| 2006 | Poland | Radosław Romanik | DHL–Author |
| 2007 | Netherlands | Joost van Leijen | Van Vliet–EBH Advocaten |
| 2008 | Denmark | Kristoffer Nielsen | Team GLS–Pakke Shop |
| 2009 | Australia | Leigh Howard | Australia (national team) |
| 2010 | Slovenia | Robert Vrečer | Perutnina Ptuj |
| 2011 | Russia | Nikita Novikov | Itera–Katusha |
| 2012 | Italy | Enrico Rossi | Meridiana–Kamen |
| 2013 | Czech Republic | Petr Vakoč | Etixx–IHNed |
| 2014 | Ukraine | Oleksandr Polivoda | Kolss Cycling Team |
| 2015 | Italy | Davide Viganò | Team Idea 2010 ASD |
| 2016 | Italy | Mauro Finetto | Unieuro–Wilier |
| 2017 | Slovenia | Jan Tratnik | CCC–Sprandi–Polkowice |
| 2018 | France | Julian Alaphilippe | Quick-Step Floors |
| 2019 | Belgium | Yves Lampaert | Deceuninck–Quick-Step |
| 2020 | Germany | Jannik Steimle | Deceuninck–Quick-Step |
| 2021 | Slovakia | Peter Sagan | Bora–Hansgrohe |
| 2022 | Czech Republic | Josef Černý | Quick-Step Alpha Vinyl Team |
| 2023 | France | Rémi Cavagna | Soudal–Quick-Step |
| 2024 | Switzerland | Mauro Schmid | Team Jayco–AlUla |
| 2025 | Great Britain | Paul Double | Team Jayco–AlUla |
| 2026 | Belgium | Lennert Van Eetvelt | Lotto–Intermarché |

== Classifications ==
As of the 2022 edition, the jerseys worn by the leaders of the individual classifications are:

- Yellow Jersey – Worn by the leader of the general classification.
- Green Jersey – Worn by the leader of the points classification.
- Red Jersey – Worn by the leader of the climbing classification.
- White Jersey – Worn by the best rider under 23 years of age on the overall classification.
- Red number Jersey – Worn by the leader of the combativity classification.
- "Slovak" Jersey – Worn by the best Slovak rider of the overall classification.

== See also ==
- Sport in Slovakia
- Slovak Cycling Federation
