= Václav Toman =

Václav Toman (30 January 1896 – 8 February 1962) was a Czech painter.

== Career ==
He was born on 30 January 1896 in Brňany. He studied at the Academy of Fine Arts in Prague under professors Vlaho Bukovac, Franz Thiele and Jakub Obrovský and at the Rijksakademie van beeldende kunsten (Academy of Fine Arts) in Amsterdam. He worked as a painter in Zlonice and was a member of the group – Union of Czech Artists in Prague. His paintings most often depict views of the landscape, architecture, various still lifes, but also portraits. In 1945, he painted a portrait of President Emil Hácha. Furthermore, one of his important paintings is the portrait of General Milan Rastislav Štefánik. He died on 8 February 1962.

== Exhibitions ==
- 1919, 1926, 1929, 1945 – Zlonice
- 1939 – Slaný
- 2012 – Regional Museum in Slaný
