= Medvedjek, Trebnje =

Medvedjek
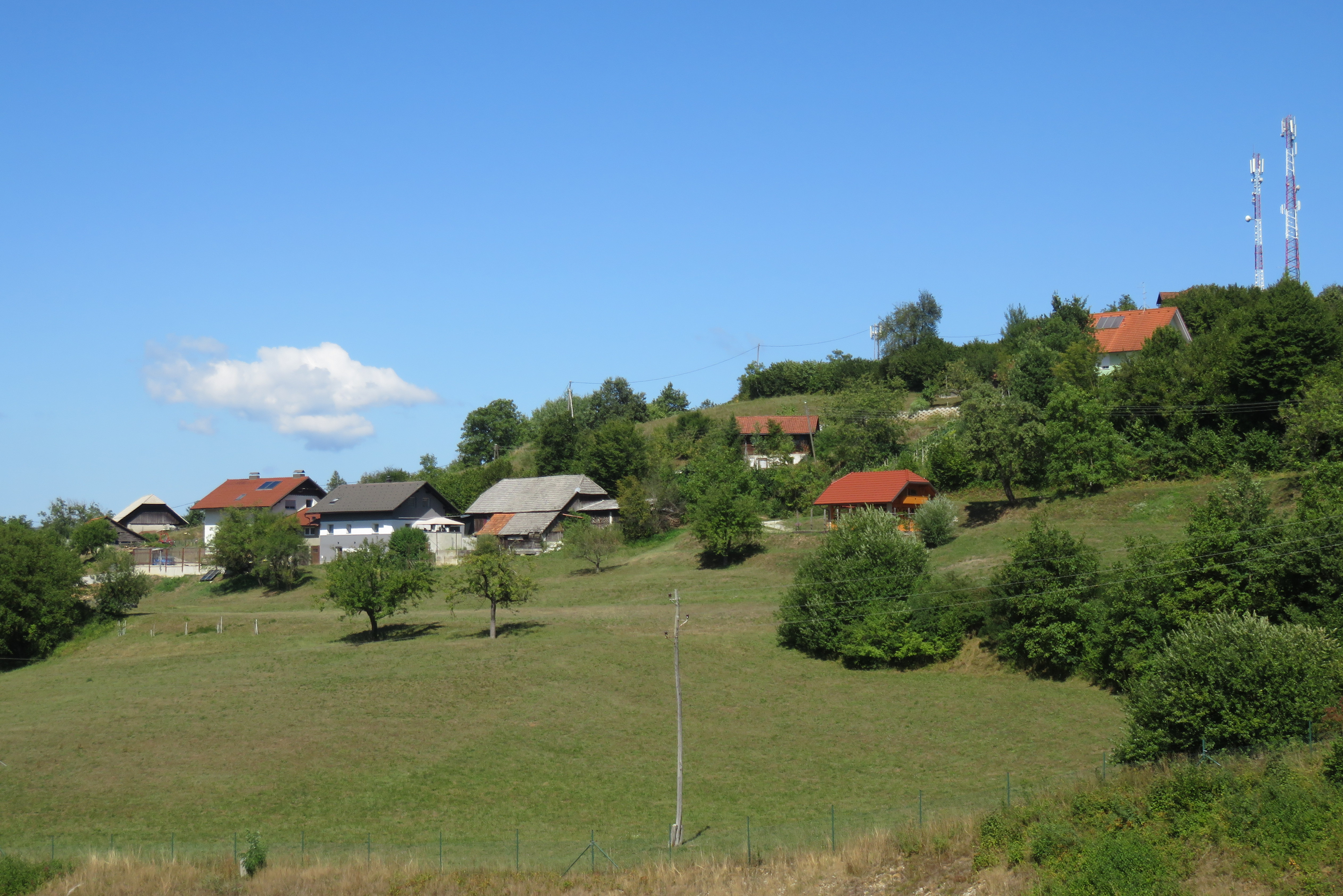

- Location in Slovenia
- Coordinates: 45°55′54.03″N 14°55′4.27″E
- Country: Slovenia
- Traditional region: Lower Carniola
- Statistical region: Southeast Slovenia
- Municipality: Trebnje

Area
  - Total: 1.3 km^{2} (0.50 sq mi)
- Elevation: 374.7 m (1,229 ft)

Population (2002)
  - Total: 62

Medvedjek (pronounced [mɛˈdʋeːdjɛk]; in older sources also Medvešček, German: Bärnberg) is a settlement east of Veliki Gaber in the Municipality of Trebnje in eastern Slovenia. The area is part of the historical region of Lower Carniola. The municipality is now included in the Southeast Slovenia Statistical Region.

== History ==
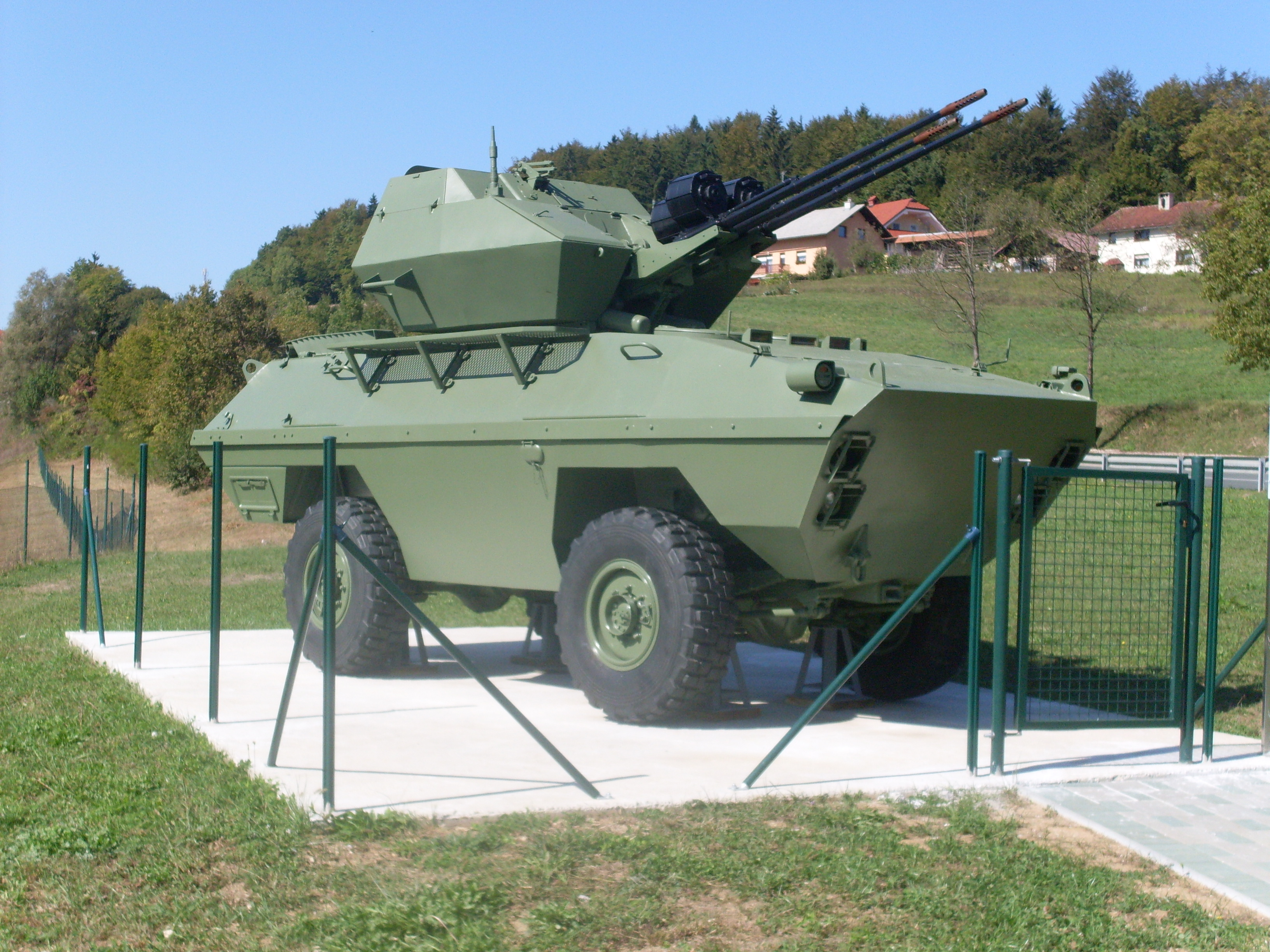
Armored fighting vehicle at the monument to the Slovenian War of Independence

On 28 June 1991 during the Slovenian Independence War a Yugoslav People's Army tank column came under attack at a truck barricade at Medvedjek. Six truck drivers were killed in an air raid that followed. In 1993 a monument to commemorate the events was unveiled at the site.

Medvedjek was a hamlet of Veliki Gaber until 1992, when it was administratively separated and made an independent settlement.

== Cultural heritage ==
The A2 motorway crosses the settlement's territory. When it was being built in the early 1980s an Iron Age and Roman-period burial ground was uncovered and partially excavated.
