= Józef Klasa =

Polish politician (1931–2023)

Member of the Sejm
- In office 19 March 1972 – 19 March 1976

Personal details
- Born: Józef Bronisław Klasa; 5 September 1931 Gmina Drwinia, Poland
- Died: 4 June 2023 (aged 91)
- Party: PZPR
- Education: Central School of Foreign Service
- Occupation: Diplomat

Józef Bronisław Klasa (5 September 1931 – 4 June 2023) was a Polish diplomat and politician. A member of the Polish United Workers' Party, he served in the Sejm from 1972 to 1976.

Klasa died on 4 June 2023, at the age of 91.
