= Witold Plutecki =

Polish cyclist

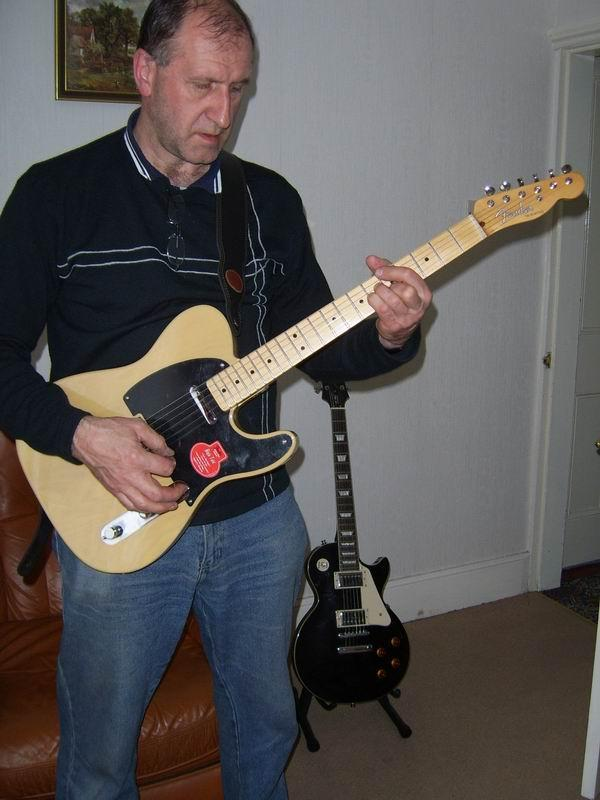

Personal information
- Born: 8 October 1956 (age 70) Gliwice, Poland

Cycling career
- Sport: Cycling

Witold Plutecki (born 8 October 1956) is a Polish former cyclist. He competed in the team time trial event at the 1980 Summer Olympics.
