= Luvsandagvyn Jargalsaikhan =

Mongolian cyclist (born 1959)

Personal information
- Born: 20 March 1959 (age 67)

Cycling career
- Sport: Cycling
- Discipline: Road
- Role: Rider

Luvsandagvyn Jargalsaikhan (born 20 March 1959) is a Mongolian former cyclist. He competed in the individual road race and team time trial events at the 1980 Summer Olympics.
