= Dashjamtsyn Tömörbaatar =

Mongolian cyclist (born 1957)

Personal information
- Born: 1 February 1957 (age 69)

Cycling career
- Sport: Cycling

Dashjamtsyn Tömörbaatar (born 1 February 1957) is a Mongolian former cyclist. He competed in the individual road race and team time trial events at the 1980 Summer Olympics.
