= Alberto Minetti =

Italian cyclist

Personal information
- Born: 18 May 1957 (age 69) Ceva, Italy

Cycling career
- Sport: Cycling

Alberto Minetti (born 18 May 1957) is an Italian former cyclist. He competed in the individual road race and team time trial events at the 1980 Summer Olympics.
