= Christian Fauré (cyclist) =

French cyclist

Personal information
- Born: 2 March 1951 (age 75) Castillon-Savès, France

Cycling career
- Sport: Cycling

Christian Fauré (born 2 March 1951) is a French former cyclist. He competed in the individual road race event at the 1980 Summer Olympics.
