= Sergei Sukhoruchenkov =

FORMER RUSSIAN CYCLIST AND OLYMPIC CHAMPION

Personal information
- Born: 10 August 1956 (age 70) Trostnaya, Bryansk Oblast, Russian SFSR, Soviet Union

Cycling career
- Sport: Cycling
- Current team: Retired
- Discipline: Road
- Role: Rider

Amateur team
- 1977–1978: Soviet Union

Professional teams
- 1989: Alfa Lum–STM
- 1990: Lada–Ghzel
Medal record
Men's cycling
Representing Soviet Union
Olympic Games
Gold medal – first place	1980 Moscow	Road race

Sergei Nikolaevich Sukhoruchenkov (Russian: Серге́й Николаевич Сухорученков, born 10 August 1956) is a former Soviet and Russian cyclist and Olympic Champion. He won the gold medal at the 1980 Olympic Games in Moscow, in the road race.

He won the Peace Race twice, in both 1979 and 1984. Sukhoruchenkov won the 1990 edition of the Vuelta Ciclista de Chile.

His daughter Olga Zabelinskaya is also a cyclist and won two bronze medals in the 2012 Olympic Games, in both the road race and the individual time trial; as well as the silver medal in the individual time trial of the 2016 Olympic Games.

== Major results ==
1978
1st Overall Tour de l'Avenir

1st Stages 1, 6a & 9

1st Overall Vuelta a Cuba

1st Stages 2 & 7

1st Stage 5 Milk Race
1979
1st Overall Tour de l'Avenir

1st Stage 6

1st Overall Peace Race

1st Stages 4 & 5

1st Overall Giro delle Regioni

1st Stage 6

1980
1st Road race, Summer Olympics
1st Stage 9 Milk Race
1st Stage 4 Giro delle Regioni
2nd Overall Okolo Slovenska
2nd Overall Tour de l'Avenir

1st Stages 8 & 11

3rd Overall Milk Race
1981
1st Overall Giro delle Regioni

1st Stages 1 & 5

1st Stage 4 Tour de Luxembourg
2nd Overall Peace Race

1st Stage 8

2nd Overall Tour de l'Avenir
1982
1st Stage 8 Grand Prix Guillaume Tell
1st Stage 4 Circuit de la Sarthe
1984
1st Overall Peace Race

1st Stage 8

1990
1st Overall Vuelta Ciclista de Chile

1st Stage 3
