= Sergey Shelpakov =

Soviet cyclist

Personal information
- Born: 18 September 1956 (age 70) Isilkul, Russia
- Height: 1.83 m (6 ft 0 in)
- Weight: 80 kg (176 lb)

Cycling career
- Sport: Cycling
Medal record
Representing the Soviet Union
Olympic Games
Gold medal – first place	1980 Moscow	Team time trial

Sergey Vasilyevich Shelpakov (Russian: Серге́й Васильевич Шелпаков; born 18 September 1956) is a retired Soviet cyclist. He was part of the Soviet team that won the 100 km time trial event at the 1980 Summer Olympics.

After retiring from competitions around 1985 he worked as a sports teacher and functionary, eventually becoming Minister of Sport of Omsk Oblast (2004–2012) and then Deputy Minister of Sport of Russia (2012–2014). He specializes in popularization of sport, especially among disabled individuals.
