= Damdinsürengiin Orgodol =

Mongolian cyclist (born 1956)

Personal information
- Born: 17 December 1956 (age 69)

Cycling career
- Sport: Cycling

Damdinsürengiin Orgodol (born 17 December 1956) is a Mongolian former cyclist. He competed in the team time trial event at the 1980 Summer Olympics.
