= Jiří Škoda =

Czech cyclist

Personal information
- Born: 27 March 1956 (age 70) Brno, Czechoslovakia
- Height: 1.80 m (5 ft 11 in)
- Weight: 78 kg (172 lb)

Cycling career
- Sport: Cycling
Medal record
Representing Czechoslovakia
Olympic Games
Bronze medal – third place	1980 Moscow	Team time trial
World Championships
Bronze medal – third place	1981 Prague	Team time trial

Jiří Škoda (born 27 March 1956) is a retired Czech cyclist who specialized in road racing. He won a bronze medal in the 100 km time trial at the 1980 Summer Olympics and at the 1981 UCI Road World Championships.

Together with Miloš Hrazdíra, he is the most successful rider of the Tour de Slovaquie, which he won in 1976, 1980 and 1985. He also won the Ytong Bohemia Tour three times (1978, 1983 and 1985) and the Giro delle Regioni twice (1984 and 1985) and Tour of Turkey in 1979.
