= Dorjpalamyn Tsolmon =

Mongolian cyclist (born 1957)

Personal information
- Born: 30 August 1957 (age 69)

Cycling career
- Sport: Cycling

Dorjpalamyn Tsolmon (born 30 August 1957) is a Mongolian former cyclist. He competed in the individual road race event at the 1980 Summer Olympics.
