= Bernd Drogan =

East German cyclist (born 1955)

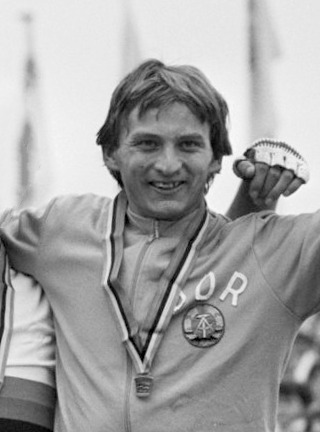
- Bernd Drogan at the 1979 UCI Road World Championships

Personal information
- Born: 26 October 1955 (age 70) Bohsdorf, Bezirk Cottbus, East Germany
- Height: 1.81 m (5 ft 11 in)
- Weight: 69 kg (152 lb)

Cycling career
- Sport: Cycling
Medal record
Representing East Germany
Olympic Games
Silver medal – second place	1980 Moscow	Team time trial
Friendship Games
Gold medal – first place	1984 Schleiz	Road race, team
World Championships
Gold medal – first place	1979 Valkenburg	Team time trial
Bronze medal – third place	1979 Valkenburg	Amateur road race
Gold medal – first place	1981 Prague	Team time trial
Gold medal – first place	1982 Goodwood	Amateur road race

Bernd Drogan (born 26 October 1955) is a retired East German cyclist who was active between 1971 and 1987. In 1979 he won a gold and a bronze medal in the road race at the World Cycling Championships, with the German team and individually. Next year he won a silver medal in the 100 km team time trial at the 1980 Summer Olympics.

He won a gold medal in the 100 km team time trial at the 1981 UCI Road World Championships, and next year finished as the world champion in the individual road race. He missed the 1984 Summer Olympics due to their boycott by East Germany and competed at the Friendship Games instead, winning a gold medal in the road race.

During his career, Drogan won several major road races, including those of Circuit de la Sarthe (1978), Around the Hainleite (1982) and Tour de Slovaquie (1983). He won the DDR Rundfahrt in 1977, 1978, 1979 and 1982. He was twice chosen the German Sportspersonality of the Year, in 1979 and 1982. He also had to cope with many setbacks: in 1975 he had blood poisoning after a fall at the national championships. In 1978, he broke a collarbone just before the start of the Peace Race. He also given up several major races due to bad falls on the road.

After retiring from competitions in 1985 he worked as a cycling coach and an accountant.

Awards
Preceded by Udo Beyer	East German Sportsman of the Year; 1979	Succeeded by Waldemar Cierpinski
Preceded by Lothar Thoms	East German Sportsman of the Year; 1982	Succeeded by Uwe Raab
