= Michal Klasa =

Personal information
- Born: 19 December 1953 (age 72) Brno, Czechoslovakia
- Height: 1.82 m (6 ft 0 in)
- Weight: 79 kg (174 lb)

Cycling career
- Sport: Cycling
Medal record
Representing Czechoslovakia
Olympic Games
Bronze medal – third place	1980 Moscow	Team time trial
Friendship Games
Bronze medal – third place	1984 Schleiz	Road race, team
World Championships
Silver medal – second place	1985 Giavera del Montello	Team time trial
Bronze medal – third place	1974 Montreal	Team pursuit
Bronze medal – third place	1981 Prague	Team time trial

Michal Klasa (born 19 December 1953) is a retired cyclist from Czechoslovakia. He competed in four events in total at the 1976 and 1980 Summer Olympics. In 1976, he finished in eights and fifth place in the 4000 m individual and team pursuit, respectively. In 1980, he won a bronze medal in the 100 km time trial, but failed to finish the individual road race. He missed the 1984 Summer Olympics due to their boycott by Czechoslovakia and competed in the Friendship Games instead, winning a bronze medal in the team road race.

Klasa won three medals at the world championships, in the team pursuit in 1974 and in the team time trial in 1981 and 1985. Between 1976 and 1985, he won more than 12 individual stages at major international races and three races overall, in Lidice (1979), Circuit des Ardennes (1981) and the Sealink Race (1981).

He retired around 1986 due to multiple past injuries and worked first as a cycling coach and then as a distributor of nutrition supplements.
