= Marco Cattaneo (cyclist, born 1957) =

Italian cyclist

Personal information
- Born: 28 October 1957 (age 68) Rovellasca, Italy

Cycling career
- Sport: Cycling

Marco Cattaneo (born 28 October 1957) is an Italian former cyclist. He competed in the individual road race event at the 1980 Summer Olympics.
