= Gianni Giacomini =

Italian cyclist

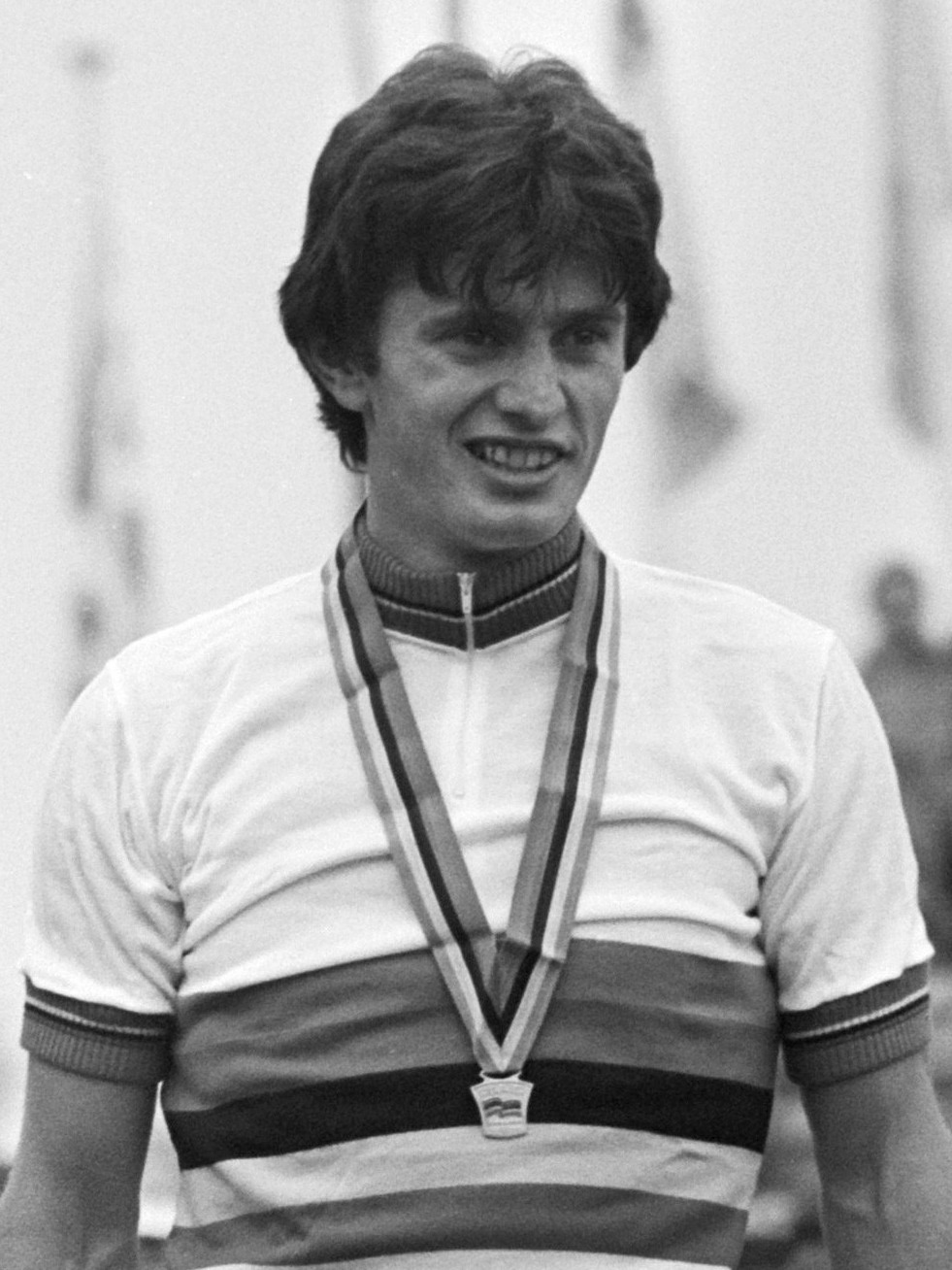
- Gianni Giacomini in 1979

Personal information
- Born: 18 August 1958 (age 67) Cimadolmo, Italy
- Height: 1.78 m (5 ft 10 in)
- Weight: 69 kg (152 lb)

Sport
- Sport: Cycling
- Club: Sammontana - Benotto
Medal record
Representing Italy
World Championships
Gold medal – first place	1979 Valkenburg	Amateur road race

Gianni Giacomini (born 18 August 1958) is a retired Italian cyclist. In 1979, he won the amateur road race at the World Cycling Championships. Next year he competed at the 1980 Summer Olympics and finished in 5th and 18th place in the 100 km time trial and road race, respectively. In 1981, he turned professional. During his short career, he suffered from a health problem (narrowing of the leg artery), and after winning the Giro di Basilicata in 1983, he retired from cycling.
