= Yuri Barinov =

Soviet cyclist

Personal information
- Born: 31 May 1955 (age 71) Doschatoye, Nizhny Novgorod Oblast, Soviet Union

Cycling career
- Sport: Cycling
- Current team: Retired
- Discipline: Road
- Role: Rider
Medal record
Men's cycling
Representing Soviet Union
Olympic Games
Bronze medal – third place	1980 Moscow	Road race

Yuri Viktorovich Barinov (Russian: Юрий Викторович Баринов; born 31 May 1955) is a former cyclist from the Soviet Union. He competed for the Soviet Union in the 1980 Summer Olympics held in Moscow, Soviet Union in the road race, individual event where he finished in third place.

He won the Peace Race in 1980 and the Tour de Luxembourg in 1981. He also competed in the 1985 Vuelta a España, finishing in 72nd position.
