= List of flag bearers for Iraq at the Olympics =

Iraq at the Olympics
- IOC code: IRQ
- NOC: National Olympic Committee of Iraq
- Website: www.iraqiolympic.org (in Arabic)
- Medals: Gold 0 Silver 0 Bronze 1 Total 1

Summer appearances
- 1948; 1952–1956; 1960; 1964; 1968; 1972–1976; 1980; 1984; 1988; 1992; 1996; 2000; 2004; 2008; 2012; 2016; 2020; 2024

This is a list of flag bearers who have represented Iraq at the Olympics.

Flag bearers carry the national flag of their country at the opening ceremony of the Olympic Games.

#	Event year	Season	Flag bearer	Sport
1	1960	Summer	Falih Fahmi	Athletics
2	1984	Summer	Ismail Salman	Boxing
3	1988	Summer	Abdul Wahab Ali	Table tennis
4	1992	Summer	Nazar Kadir	Weightlifting
5	1996	Summer	Raed Ahmed	Weightlifting
6	2000	Summer	Bashar Mohammad Ali	Official
7	2004	Summer	Hadir Lazame	Judo
8	2008	Summer	Hamzah Al-Hilfi	Rowing (did not compete)
9	2012	Summer	Dana Hussain	Athletics
10	2016	Summer	Waheed Abdul-Ridha	Boxing
11	2020	Summer	Fatimah Al-Kaabi	Shooting
11	2020	Summer	Mohammed Al-Khafaji	Rowing
12	2024	Summer	Ali Ammar Yusur Rubaiawi	Weightlifting

== See also ==
- Iraq at the Olympics
