= Athletics at the 1960 Summer Olympics – Men's 4 × 100 metres relay =

Men's 4 × 100 metres relay at the Games of the XVII Olympiad
- Venue: Olympic Stadium
- Dates: September 7, 1960 (heats and semifinals); September 8, 1960 (final)

Medalists
1st place, gold medalist(s)		Bernd Cullmann; Armin Hary; Walter Mahlendorf; Martin Lauer; United Team of Germany
2nd place, silver medalist(s)		Gusman Kosanov; Leonid Bartenev; Yuriy Konovalov; Edvin Ozolin; Soviet Union
3rd place, bronze medalist(s)		Peter Radford; David Jones; David Segal; Nick Whitehead; Great Britain

The men's 4 × 100 metres relay event at the 1960 Olympic Games took place on September 7 and 8.

== Results ==
=== Heats ===
The fastest three teams in each of the four heats advanced to the semifinal round.

Heat one

Rank	Name	Nationality	Time	Notes
1	Peter Radford; David Jones; David Segal; Nick Whitehead	Great Britain	40.27	
2	Gusman Kosanov; Leonid Bartenev; Yuriy Konovalov; Edvin Ozolin	Soviet Union	40.39	
3	Peter Laeng; Heinz Müller; Werner Schaufelberger; Sebald Schnellmann	Switzerland	40.92	
4	Jassim Karim Kuraishi; Khudhir Zalata; Falih Fahmi; Mahmoud Ghanim	Iraq	41.87	
5	Boonsong Arjtaweekul; Prajim Wongsuwan; Phaibulya Vacharabhan; Suthi Manyakass	Thailand	42.19	

Heat two

Rank	Name	Nationality	Time	Notes
1	Armando Sardi; Pier Giorgio Cazzola; Salvatore Giannone; Livio Berruti	Italy	40.16	
2	Jimmy Omagbemi; Abdul Karim Amu; Smart Akraka; Adebayo Oladapo	Nigeria	40.25	
3	Clive Bonas; Horacio Esteves*; Emilio Romero; Rafael Romero	Venezuela	41.11	
4	Remegio Vista; Isaac Gómez; Enrique Bautista; Rogelio Onofre	Philippines	41.55	
-	Aggrey Awori; Gadi Ado; Erasmus Amukun; Jean Baptiste Okello	Uganda	[41.90]	DQ

Heat three

Rank	Name	Nationality	Time	Notes
1	Bernd Cullmann; Armin Hary; Walter Mahlendorf; Martin Lauer	United Team of Germany	39.61	=WR
2	Ioannis Komitoudis; Konstantinos Lolos; Leonidas Kormalis; Nikolaos Georgopoulos	Greece	41.81	
3	Abdul Malik; Muhammad Ramzan Ali; Ghulam Raziq; Abdul Khaliq	Pakistan	42.67	
-	Marian Foik; Jan Jarzembowski; Józef Szmidt; Jerzy Juskowiak	Poland	[40.73]	DQ

Heat four

Rank	Name	Nationality	Time	Notes
1	Frank Budd; Ray Norton; Stone Johnson; Dave Sime	United States	39.87	
2	Lynn Eves; George Short; Terry Tobacco; Harry Jerome*	Canada	42.27	
3	Keiji Ogushi; Kimitada Hayase; Takayuki Okazaki; Hiroshi Shibata	Japan	42.60	
4	Abdul Ghafar Ghafoori; Abdul Hadi Shekaib; Habib Sayed; Ali Yusuf Zaid	Afghanistan	44.53	
-	Paul Genevay; Jocelyn Delecour; Abdoulaye Seye; Claude Piquemal	France	[40.45]	DQ

=== Semifinals ===
The fastest three runners in each of the two heats advanced to the final round.

Heat one

Rank	Name	Nationality	Time	Notes
1	Bernd Cullmann; Armin Hary; Walter Mahlendorf; Martin Lauer	United Team of Germany	39.88	
2	Clive Bonas; Lloyd Murad; Emilio Romero; Rafael Romero	Venezuela	40.49	
3	Peter Radford; David Jones; David Segal; Nick Whitehead	Great Britain	40.63	
4	Lynn Eves; George Short; Terry Tobacco; Sig Ohlemann	Canada	41.27	
5	Keiji Ogushi; Kimitada Hayase; Takayuki Okazaki; Hiroshi Shibata	Japan	42.39	
-	Jimmy Omagbemi; Abdul Karim Amu; Smart Akraka; Adebayo Oladapo	Nigeria	[40.33]	DQ

Heat two

Rank	Name	Nationality	Time	Notes
1	Frank Budd; Ray Norton; Stone Johnson; Dave Sime	United States	39.67	
2	Armando Sardi; Pier Giorgio Cazzola; Salvatore Giannone; Livio Berruti	Italy	40.29	
3	Gusman Kosanov; Leonid Bartenev; Yuriy Konovalov; Edvin Ozolin	Soviet Union	40.30	
4	Peter Laeng; Heinz Müller; Werner Schaufelberger; Sebald Schnellmann	Switzerland	41.06	
5	Ioannis Komitoudis; Konstantinos Lolos; Leonidas Kormalis; Nikolaos Georgopoulos	Greece	41.90	
6	Abdul Malik; Muhammad Ramzan Ali; Ghulam Raziq; Abdul Khaliq	Pakistan	42.99	

=== Final ===
The United States team (of Frank Budd-Ray Norton-Stone Johnson-Dave Sime) finished first in a world record time of 39.4 s but were disqualified because at the first exchange from Budd to Norton, Norton started too early and the exchange happened outside the changeover box. The West German team who finished second in 39.5 s received the gold medals and became the new world record holders.

Rank	Name	Nationality	Time	Notes
1st place, gold medalist(s)	Bernd Cullmann; Armin Hary; Walter Mahlendorf; Martin Lauer	United Team of Germany	39.4 (39.66)	WR
2nd place, silver medalist(s)	Gusman Kosanov; Leonid Bartenev; Yuriy Konovalov; Edvin Ozolin	Soviet Union	40.1 (40.24)	
3rd place, bronze medalist(s)	Peter Radford; David Jones; David Segal; Nick Whitehead	Great Britain	40.2 (40.32)	
4	Armando Sardi; Pier Giorgio Cazzola; Salvatore Giannone; Livio Berruti	Italy	40.2 (40.33)	
5	Clive Bonas; Lloyd Murad; Emilio Romero; Rafael Romero	Venezuela	40.7 (40.83)	
-	Frank Budd; Ray Norton; Stone Johnson; Dave Sime	United States	[39.4 (39.60)]	DQ

Key: WR = world record; =WR = equalled world record; DQ = disqualified; * = competed in heats only
