= Athletics at the 1960 Summer Olympics – Men's 100 metres =

Men's 100 metres at the Games of the XVII Olympiad
- Venue: Stadio Olimpico; Rome, Italy
- Dates: 31 August 1960 (heats, quarterfinals); 1 September 1960 (semifinals, final)
- Competitors: 61 from 45 nations
- Winning time: 10.2 seconds

Medalists
1st place, gold medalist(s)		Armin Hary	United Team of Germany
2nd place, silver medalist(s)		Dave Sime	United States
3rd place, bronze medalist(s)		Peter Radford	Great Britain

Official Video Highlights

The men's 100 metres was an event at the 1960 Summer Olympics in Rome, Italy. The competition was held at the Olympic Stadium on 31 August and 1 September. Sixty-five competitors from 48 nations entered, but 61 competitors from 45 nations participated. Nations were limited to three athletes each under rules set at the 1930 Olympic Congress.

The event was won in a photo finish by Armin Hary of the United Team of Germany, earning the first Olympic title by a German runner in the event (Fritz Hofmann was second in 1896) and breaking the United States' streak of five straight wins. American Dave Sime was the silver medalist, posting the same Olympic record time (10.2 seconds) as Hary (they were separated by a photo-finish).

== Summary ==
Since winning the 1958 European Championship, Armin Hary was a known commodity. His incredible reaction time supposedly had been clocked using high speed cameras at .03 of a second, while normal humans react from .15 upward. Some of his competitors thought he was using some sort of trickery.

Along with Enrique Figuerola asking for a pause, the proceedings to start this 10 second race took 20 minutes. Hary's incredible reaction to the gun and sprint form through the acceleration phase has been studied for generations, needless to say it put him in the lead, on the outside of the track in lane 6, putting nearly a 2-metre gap on Peter Radford to his inside. Dave Sime was the slowest out of the blocks with a deficit to make up across the track from Hary in lane 1. But make up the deficit he did, gaining with every step, passing the field by 70 metres and gaining until he was virtually running stride for stride against Hary at the line. Hary held Sime off, leaning at the tape to take the gold. With the fastest closing speed over the last 20 metres, Radford made up a big gap, to take the slight edge over Figueola and Frank Budd all finishing together.

Later, as a professor of sports science, Radford said he thinks he figured out the "tell" Hary used to anticipate the gun.

"He'd wait until we were all on our fingertips in the set position. Then he'd take up his place, pause momentarily – and run. He might get caught with a false start, but he might also get away with it."

Hary ran representing the United Team of Germany, a combined team of German athletes from East and West Germany.

== Background ==
This was the fourteenth time the event was held, having appeared at every Olympics since the first in 1896. Manfred Germar, 5th place in 1956, was the only finalist from the Melbourne Games to return in 1960. Notable entrants, along with Hary and Germar, were Americans Ray Norton (U.S. Olympic trial champion), Dave Sime, and Frank Budd, and Canada's Harry Jerome (who shared the world record with Hary at 10 seconds flat).

The British West Indies, Fiji, Kenya, Morocco, South Korea, and Sudan were represented in the event for the first time. The United States was the only nation to have appeared at each of the first fourteen Olympic men's 100 metres events.

== Competition format ==
The event retained the same basic four round format from 1920–1956: heats, quarterfinals, semifinals, and a final. However, the format was tweaked for the first time since 1936. The number of heats was reduced from 12 to 9 (with six or seven athletes per heat), with the number of runners advancing from each heat increased from 2 to 3. This led to 27 quarterfinalists (up from 24), so the 4 quarterfinal heats were now unbalanced: one had 6 athletes while the other three had 7. As before, however, the top 3 in each quarterfinal advanced to the semifinals. There were 2 heats of 6 semifinalists, once again with the top 3 advancing to the 6-man final.

== Records ==
Prior to the competition, the existing World and Olympic records were as follows.

World record	10.0	(Germany) Armin Hary	Zürich, Switzerland	21 June 1960
World record	10.0	(Canada) Harry Jerome	Saskatoon, Canada	15 July 1960
Olympic record	10.3	(United States) Eddie Tolan	Los Angeles, USA	1 August 1932
Olympic record	10.3	(United States) Ralph Metcalfe	Los Angeles, USA	1 August 1932
Olympic record	10.3	(United States) Jesse Owens	Berlin, Germany	2 August 1936
Olympic record	10.3	(United States) Harrison Dillard	London, United Kingdom	31 July, 1948
Olympic record	10.3	(United States) Bobby Morrow	Melbourne, Australia	23 November 1956
Olympic record	10.3	(United States) Ira Murchison	Melbourne, Australia	23 November 1956
Olympic record	10.3	(United States) Bobby Morrow	Melbourne, Australia	24 November 1956

Armin Hary broke the 28-year-old Olympic record with a 10.2 second run in the quarterfinals. He (along with Dave Sime) matched that 10.2 second result in the final.

== Results ==
=== Heats ===
The top three runners in each of the 9 heats advanced.

==== Heat 1 ====
Wind: -0.3 m/s

Rank	Athlete	Nation	Time (hand)	Time (automatic)	Notes
1	Enrique Figuerola	Cuba	10.4	10.57	Q
2	Carl Fredrik Bunæs	Norway	10.7	10.80	Q
3	Yuriy Konovalov	Soviet Union	10.7	10.83	Q
4	Suthi Manyakass	Thailand	10.8	10.87	
5	Mikhail Bachvarov	Bulgaria	11.0	10.95	
6	Amos Grodzinowsky	Israel	11.1	11.19	
7	Raj Joshi Tilak	India	11.3	11.43	

==== Heat 2 ====
Wind: -0.2 m/s

Rank	Athlete	Nation	Time (hand)	Time (automatic)	Notes
1	Seraphino Antao	Kenya	10.5	10.64	Q
2	Armin Hary	United Team of Germany	10.6	10.74	Q
3	Heinz Müller	Switzerland	10.8	10.94	Q
4	Gustav Ntiforo	Ghana	11.0	11.15	
5	Isaac Gómez	Philippines	11.0	11.19	
6	Dennis Tipping	Australia	11.2	11.30	
7	Abdul Khaliq	Pakistan	11.2	11.34	

==== Heat 3 ====
Wind: -0.3 m/s

Rank	Athlete	Nation	Time (hand)	Time (automatic)	Notes
1	Horacio Esteves	Venezuela	10.4	10.62	Q
2	Dennis Johnson	British West Indies	10.4	10.66	Q
3	Dave Sime	United States	10.5	10.75	Q
4	Lynn Eves	Canada	10.8	11.01	
5	Aggrey Awori	Uganda	10.9	11.09	
6	Patrick Lowry	Ireland	10.9	11.11	
7	Roba Negousse	Ethiopia	11.3	11.47	

==== Heat 4 ====
Wind: -0.2 m/s

Rank	Athlete	Nation	Time (hand)	Time (automatic)	Notes
1	Harry Jerome	Canada	10.5	10.72	Q
2	Jocelyn Delecour	France	10.5	10.75	Q
3	Erasmus Amukun	Uganda	10.6	10.80	Q
4	Affonso da Silva	Brazil	10.8	10.98	
5	Bouchaib El-Maachi	Morocco	10.9	11.11	
6	Shahrudin Mohamed Ali	Malaya	11.0	11.11	
-	James Omagbemi	Nigeria	DNS	–	

==== Heat 5 ====
Wind: -0.2 m/s

Rank	Athlete	Nation	Time (hand)	Time (automatic)	Notes
1	Tom Robinson	Bahamas	10.5	10.68	Q
2	Lloyd Murad	Venezuela	10.7	10.82	Q
3	Sitiveni Moceidreke	Fiji	10.8	10.92	Q
4	George Short	Canada	10.9	11.04	
5	Emmanuel Putu	Liberia	11.2	11.34	
6	Kim Jong-cheol	South Korea	11.5	11.63	
	Rouhollah Rahmani	Iran	DNS	–	

==== Heat 6 ====
Wind: -0.5 m/s

Rank	Athlete	Nation	Time (hand)	Time (automatic)	Notes
1	Ray Norton	United States	10.7	10.88	Q
2	Gusman Kosanov	Soviet Union	10.7	10.90	Q
3	Santiago Plaza	Mexico	10.8	10.95	Q
4	Walter Mahlendorf	United Team of Germany	10.8	10.98	
5	Romain Poté	Belgium	11.0	11.19	
6	Aydin Onur	Turkey	11.3	11.45	
7	Abdul Hadi Shekaib	Afghanistan	11.6	11.79	

==== Heat 7 ====
Wind: -0.3 m/s

Rank	Athlete	Nation	Time (hand)	Time (automatic)	Notes
1	David Jones	Great Britain	10.5	10.69	Q
2	Abdoulaye Seye	France	10.6	10.75	Q
3	Rafael Romero	Venezuela	10.7	10.89	Q
4	Elmar Kunauer	Austria	11.0	11.13	
5	Huang Suh-chuang	Formosa	11.2	11.37	
6	Khudhir Zalata	Iraq	11.3	11.50	
	Iftikhar Shah	Pakistan	DNF	–	

==== Heat 8 ====
Wind: -0.1 m/s

Rank	Athlete	Nation	Time (hand)	Time (automatic)	Notes
1	Marian Foik	Poland	10.5	–	Q
2	Edward Jefferys	South Africa	10.6	–	Q
3	Claude Piquemal	France	10.7	–	Q
4	Jalal Gozal	Indonesia	10.9	–	
5	Manfred Germar	United Team of Germany	11.0	–	
6	Hamdan El-Tayeb	Sudan	11.1	–	
7	José Albarrán	Spain	11.2	–	

==== Heat 9 ====
Wind: -0.2 m/s

Rank	Athlete	Nation	Time (hand)	Time (automatic)	Notes
1	Peter Radford	Great Britain	10.4	10.51	Q
2	Frank Budd	United States	10.4	10.55	Q
3	Edvin Ozolin	Soviet Union	10.7	10.86	Q
4	Hilmar Thorbjörnsson	Iceland	10.9	11.05	
5	Nikolaos Georgopoulos	Greece	11.0	11.12	
6	Moustafa Abdel Kader	Egypt	11.2	11.34	
7	James Roberts	Liberia	11.2	11.37	

=== Quarterfinal ===
The top three runners in each of the four heats advanced to the semifinals.

==== Quarterfinal 1 ====
Wind: -0.5 m/s

Rank	Athlete	Nation	Time (hand)	Time (automatic)	Notes
1	Horacio Esteves	Venezuela	10.5	10.71	Q
2	Tom Robinson	Bahamas	10.6	10.76	Q
3	Ray Norton	United States	10.6	10.78	Q
4	Jocelyn Delecour	France	10.7	10.87	
5	Edward Jefferys	South Africa	10.7	10.89	
6	Edvins Ozolinš	Soviet Union	10.7	10.90	
7	Heinz Müller	Switzerland	10.8	10.95	

==== Quarterfinal 2 ====
Wind: -0.3 m/s

Rank	Athlete	Nation	Time (hand)	Time (automatic)	Notes
1	Armin Hary	United Team of Germany	10.2	10.32	Q, OR
2	Dave Sime	United States	10.3	10.37	Q
3	Marian Foik	Poland	10.4	10.48	Q
4	Dennis Johnson	British West Indies	10.4	10.51	
5	Carl Fredrik Bunæs	Norway	10.5	10.69	
6	Yuriy Konovalov	Soviet Union	10.5	10.69	
7	Sitiveni Moceidreke	Fiji	10.7	10.85	

==== Quarterfinal 3 ====
Wind: -1.3 m/s

Rank	Athlete	Nation	Time (hand)	Time (automatic)	Notes
1	Frank Budd	United States	10.4	10.52	Q
2	Enrique Figuerola	Cuba	10.4	10.53	Q
3	David Jones	Great Britain	10.5	10.68	Q
4	Erasmus Amukun	Uganda	10.6	10.75	
5	Claude Piquemal	France	10.6	10.76	
6	Gusman Kosanov	Soviet Union	10.7	10.87	
7	Santiago Plaza	Mexico	10.8	10.93	

==== Quarterfinal 4 ====
Wind: -2.3 m/s

Rank	Athlete	Nation	Time (hand)	Time (automatic)	Notes
1	Harry Jerome	Canada	10.4	10.58	Q
2	Peter Radford	Great Britain	10.4	10.60	Q
3	Seraphino Antao	Kenya	10.4	10.61	Q
4	Abdoulaye Seye	France	10.4	10.64	
5	Lloyd Murad	Venezuela	10.8	10.97	
6	Rafael Romero	Venezuela	11.1	11.23	

=== Semifinals ===
The top three runners in each of the two semifinals advanced to the final.

==== Semifinal 1 ====
Wind: 0.0 m/s

Rank	Athlete	Nation	Time (hand)	Time (automatic)	Notes
1	Peter Radford	Great Britain	10.4	10.57	Q
2	Enrique Figuerola	Cuba	10.4	10.58	Q
3	Frank Budd	United States	10.5	10.65	Q
4	Marian Foik	Poland	10.5	10.66	
5	Tom Robinson	Bahamas	10.5	10.69	
-	Harry Jerome	Canada	DNF	–	

==== Semifinal 2 ====
Wind: 0.0 m/s

Rank	Athlete	Nation	Time (hand)	Time (automatic)	Notes
1	Armin Hary	United Team of Germany	10.3	10.41	Q
2	Dave Sime	United States	10.4	10.46	Q
3	Ray Norton	United States	10.4	10.47	Q
4	David Jones	Great Britain	10.4	10.48	
5	Horacio Esteves	Venezuela	10.5	10.57	
6	Seraphino Antao	Kenya	10.6	10.72	

=== Final ===
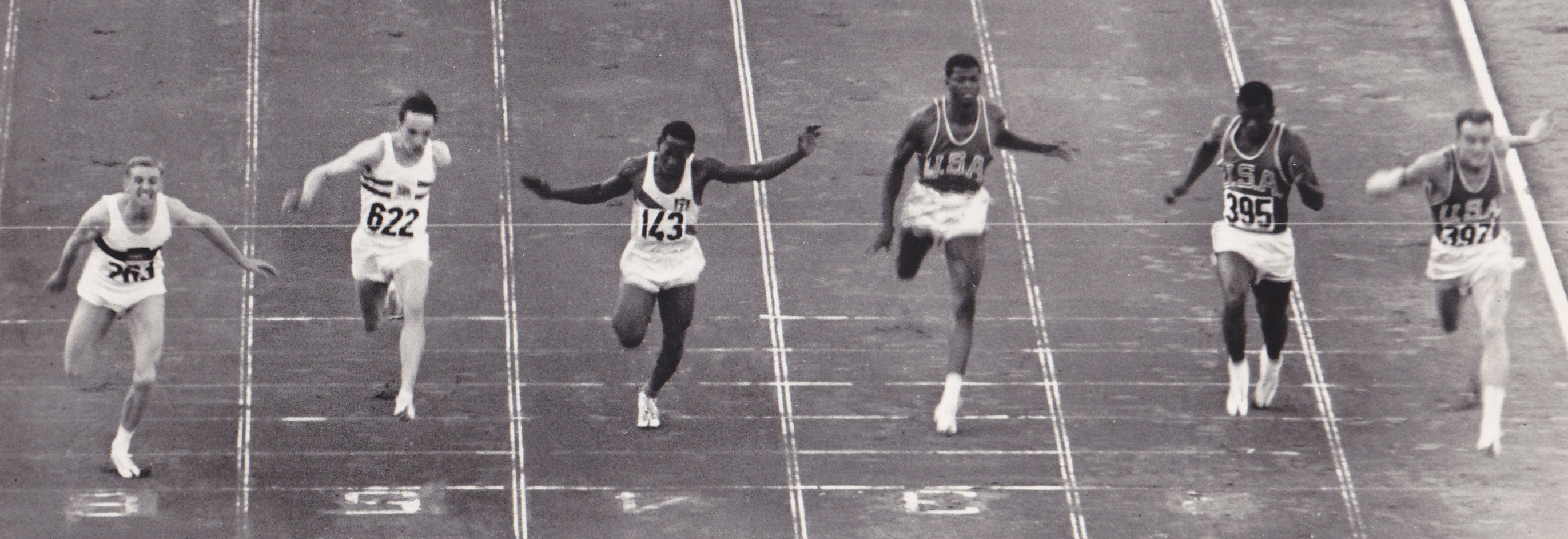
100 m final, left-right: Armin Hary, Peter Radford, Enrique Figuerola, Ray Norton, Frank Budd, Dave Sime

Armin Hary and Dave Sime tied the Olympic record.

Wind: 0.0 m/s

Rank	Athlete	Nation	Time (hand)	Time (automatic)	Notes
1st place, gold medalist(s)	Armin Hary	United Team of Germany	10.2	10.32	=OR
2nd place, silver medalist(s)	Dave Sime	United States	10.2	10.35	=OR
3rd place, bronze medalist(s)	Peter Radford	Great Britain	10.3	10.42	
4	Enrique Figuerola	Cuba	10.3	10.44	
5	Frank Budd	United States	10.3	10.46	
6	Ray Norton	United States	10.4	10.50	
