= Iraq at the 2012 Summer Olympics =

- IOC code: IRQ
- NOC: National Olympic Committee of Iraq
- Website: www.iraqiolympic.org (in Arabic)

in London
- Competitors: 8 in 7 sports
- Flag bearers: Dana Hussain (opening); Ali Nadhim (closing)
- Medals: Gold 0 Silver 0 Bronze 0 Total 0

Summer Olympics appearances (overview)
- 1948; 1952–1956; 1960; 1964; 1968; 1972–1976; 1980; 1984; 1988; 1992; 1996; 2000; 2004; 2008; 2012; 2016; 2020; 2024

Iraq competed at the 2012 Summer Olympics in London, held from 27 July to 12 August 2012. This was the nation's 13th appearance at the Olympics since its debut at the 1948 Summer Olympics in the same host city.

The National Olympic Committee of Iraq sent a total of eight athletes to the Games, five men and three women, to compete in seven different sports.

== Background ==
Iraq was first represented at the 1948 Summer Olympics in London, England, United Kingdom. They began competing regularly following the 1980 Summer Olympics in Moscow, Russian Soviet Federative Socialist Republic, Soviet Union. The 2012 Summer Olympics in London, England, United Kingdom marked Iraq's 13th appearance at the Summer Olympics.

== Competitors ==
In total, eight athletes represented Iraq at the 2012 Summer Olympics in London, England, United Kingdom across seven different sports.

Sport	Men	Women	Total
Archery	0	1	1
Athletics	1	1	2
Boxing	1	0	1
Shooting	0	1	1
Swimming	1	0	1
Weightlifting	1	0	1
Wrestling	1	0	1
Total	5	3	8

== Archery ==
In total, one Iraqi athlete participated in the archery events – Rand Al-Mashhadani in the women's individual.

Athlete	Event	Ranking round		Round of 64	Round of 32	Round of 16	Quarterfinals	Semifinals	Final / BM	
Athlete	Event	Score	Seed	Opposition Score	Opposition Score	Opposition Score	Opposition Score	Opposition Score	Opposition Score	Rank
Rand Al-Mashhadani	Women's individual	498	64	Ki B-b (KOR) (1); L 0–6	Did not advance					

== Athletics ==
In total, two Iraqi athletes participated in the athletics events – Adnan Taess Akkar in the men's 800 m and Dana Hussain in the women's 100 m.

Men

Athlete	Event	Heat		Semifinal		Final	
Athlete	Event	Result	Rank	Result	Rank	Result	Rank
Adnan Taess Akkar	800 m	1:47.83	5	Did not advance			

Women

Athlete	Event	Heat		Quarterfinal		Semifinal		Final	
Athlete	Event	Result	Rank	Result	Rank	Result	Rank	Result	Rank
Dana Hussain	100 m	11.91	2 Q	11.81	8	Did not advance			

== Boxing ==
In total, one Iraqi athlete participated in the boxing events – Ahmad Abdul-Karim in the men's welterweight category.

Athlete	Event	Round of 32	Round of 16	Quarterfinals	Semifinals	Final	
Athlete	Event	Opposition Result	Opposition Result	Opposition Result	Opposition Result	Opposition Result	Rank
Ahmad Abdul-Karim	Welterweight	Lusizi (RSA); L 13–17	Did not advance				

== Shooting ==
In total, one Iraqi athlete participated in the shooting events – Noor Amer in the women's 10 m air pistol.

Athlete	Event	Qualification		Final	
Athlete	Event	Points	Rank	Points	Rank
Noor Amer	10 m air pistol	360	46	Did not advance	

== Swimming ==
In total, one Iraqi athlete participated in the swimming events – Mohanad Al‐Azzawi in the men's 100 m butterfly.

Athlete	Event	Heat		Semifinal		Final	
Athlete	Event	Time	Rank	Time	Rank	Time	Rank
Mohanad Al‐Azzawi	100 m butterfly	1:00.71	41	Did not advance			

== Weightlifting ==
In total, one Iraqi athlete participated in the weightlifting events – Safaa Al-Jumaili in the men's −85 kg category.

Athlete	Event	Snatch		Clean & Jerk		Total	Rank
Athlete	Event	Result	Rank	Result	Rank	Total	Rank
Safaa Al-Jumaili	Men's −85 kg	150	15	195	12	345	13

== Wrestling ==
In total, one Iraqi athlete participated in the wrestling events – Ali Nadhim in the men's Greco-Roman −120 kg category.

Athlete	Event	Qualification	Round of 16	Quarterfinal	Semifinal	Repechage 1	Repechage 2	Final / BM	
Athlete	Event	Opposition Result	Opposition Result	Opposition Result	Opposition Result	Opposition Result	Opposition Result	Opposition Result	Rank
Ali Nadhim	−120 kg	Babajanzadeh (IRI); L 0–3 ^{PO}	Did not advance						15
