= Iraq at the 1964 Summer Olympics =

- IOC code: IRQ
- NOC: National Olympic Committee of Iraq

in Tokyo, Japan 10–24 October 1964
- Competitors: 13 in 3 sports
- Medals: Gold 0 Silver 0 Bronze 0 Total 0

Summer Olympics appearances (overview)
- 1948; 1952–1956; 1960; 1964; 1968; 1972–1976; 1980; 1984; 1988; 1992; 1996; 2000; 2004; 2008; 2012; 2016; 2020; 2024; 2028

Iraq competed at the 1964 Summer Olympics in Tokyo, Japan, which ran from 11 October 1964 to 24 October 1964. Iraq sent thirteen athletes to compete in boxing, weightlifting and track and field but did not win any medals.

== Competitors ==
Name	Sport
Aziz Abbas	Weightlifting
Hadi Abdul Jabbar	Weightlifting
Khalid Al-Karkhi (Note: also competed at the 1960 Summer Olympics)	Boxing
Yousef Anwer	Boxing
Abdul Khalik Juad	Weightlifting
Jassim Karim Kuraishi	Athletics
Khalid Tawfik Lazim	Athletics
Zuhair Elia Mansour	Weightlifting
Mohammed Nadum	Weightlifting
Mahmoud Rashid	Wrestling
Ali Soaadi	Weightlifting
Mahmoud Shakir	Wrestling
Samir Vincent	Athletics
Khudhir Zalata	Athletics
