= Iraq at the 2004 Summer Olympics =

- IOC code: IRQ
- NOC: National Olympic Committee of Iraq
- Website: www.iraqiolympic.org (in Arabic)

in Athens
- Competitors: 25 in 7 sports
- Flag bearer: Hadir Lazame
- Medals: Gold 0 Silver 0 Bronze 0 Total 0

Summer Olympics appearances (overview)
- 1948; 1952–1956; 1960; 1964; 1968; 1972–1976; 1980; 1984; 1988; 1992; 1996; 2000; 2004; 2008; 2012; 2016; 2020; 2024

Iraq competed at the 2004 Summer Olympics in Athens, Greece, from 13 to 29 August 2004.

== Athletics ==
Iraqi athletes have so far achieved qualifying standards in the following athletics events (up to a maximum of 3 athletes in each event at the 'A' Standard, and 1 at the 'B' Standard).

Key

- Note–Ranks given for track events are within the athlete's heat only
- Q = Qualified for the next round
- q = Qualified for the next round as a fastest loser or, in field events, by position without achieving the qualifying target
- NR = National record
- N/A = Round not applicable for the event
- Bye = Athlete not required to compete in round

Men

Athlete	Event	Heat		Semifinal		Final	
Athlete	Event	Result	Rank	Result	Rank	Result	Rank
Alaa Motar	400 m hurdles	51.97	6	Did not advance			

Women

Athlete	Event	Heat		Quarterfinal		Semifinal		Final	
Athlete	Event	Result	Rank	Result	Rank	Result	Rank	Result	Rank
Alaa Jassim	100 m	12.70	8	Did not advance					

== Boxing ==
Iraq sent one boxer to the 2004 Summer Olympics.

Athlete	Event	Round of 32	Round of 16	Quarterfinals	Semifinals	Final	
Athlete	Event	Opposition Result	Opposition Result	Opposition Result	Opposition Result	Opposition Result	Rank
Najah Ali	Light flyweight	Kwak H-J (PRK); W 21–7	Nalbandyan (ARM); L 11–24	Did not advance			

== Football ==
=== Men's tournament ===
Roster

The following is the Iraqi squad in the men's football tournament of the 2004 Summer Olympics.

Head coach: Adnan Hamad

No.	Pos.	Player	Date of birth (age)	Caps	Goals	2004 club
1	GK	Noor Sabri	18 June 1984 (aged 20)	0	0	(Iraq) Al-Talaba
2	DF	Saad Attiya	26 February 1987 (aged 17)	0	0	(Iraq) Al-Zawraa
3	DF	Bassim Abbas	1 July 1982 (aged 22)	0	0	(Iraq) Al-Talaba
4	DF	Haidar Abdul-Jabar*	25 August 1976 (aged 27)	0	0	(Syria) Al-Ittihad Aleppo
5	MF	Nashat Akram	12 September 1984 (aged 19)	0	0	(Saudi Arabia) Al Shabab
6	MF	Salih Sadir	21 August 1981 (aged 22)	0	0	(Lebanon) Al-Ansar
7	FW	Emad Mohammed	24 July 1982 (aged 22)	0	0	(Iran) Foolad FC
8	MF	Abdul-Wahab Abu Al-Hail*	21 December 1976 (aged 27)	0	0	(Iran) Esteghlal Ahvaz
9	FW	Razzaq Farhan*	1 July 1977 (aged 27)	0	0	(Bahrain) Al Rifaa
10	FW	Younis Mahmoud	3 February 1983 (aged 21)	0	0	(Qatar) Al-Khor
11	MF	Hawar Mulla Mohammed	1 June 1981 (aged 23)	0	0	(Lebanon) Al-Ansar
12	DF	Haidar Abdul-Razzaq	9 June 1982 (aged 22)	0	0	(Syria) Al-Ittihad Aleppo
13	MF	Qusay Munir	12 April 1981 (aged 23)	0	0	(Saudi Arabia) Al Hazm
14	DF	Haidar Abdul-Amir	5 April 1982 (aged 22)	0	0	(Iraq) Al-Zawraa
15	MF	Mahdi Karim	10 December 1983 (aged 20)	0	0	(Cyprus) Apollon Limassol
16	FW	Ahmad Mnajed	13 December 1981 (aged 22)	0	0	(Iraq) Al-Zawraa
17	FW	Ahmed Salah	18 June 1982 (aged 22)	0	0	(Syria) Al-Ittihad Aleppo
18	GK	Uday Talib	6 November 1981 (aged 22)	0	0	(Iraq) Al-Zawraa

* Over-aged player.

Group play

Pos	Team	Pld	W	D	L	GF	GA	GD	Pts	Qualification
1	Iraq	3	2	0	1	7	4	+3	6	Qualified for the quarterfinals
2	Costa Rica	3	1	1	1	4	4	0	4	Qualified for the quarterfinals
3	Morocco	3	1	1	1	3	3	0	4	
4	Portugal	3	1	0	2	6	9	−3	3	

12 August 2004
20:30

Iraq	4 – 2	Portugal
E. Mohammed 16'; H. Mohammed 29'; Y. Mahmoud 56'; Sadir 90+3'	Report	Jabar 13' (o.g.); Bosingwa 45'

Pampeloponnisiako Stadium, Patras
Attendance: 5,689
Referee: Divine Evehe (Cameroon)

15 August 2004
20:30

Costa Rica	0 – 2	Iraq
	Report	H. Mohammed 67'; Karim 72'

Karaiskaki Stadium, Piraeus
Attendance: 12,150
Referee: Charles Ariiotima (Tahiti)

18 August 2004
20:30

Morocco	2 – 1	Iraq
Bouden 69' (pen.); Aqqal 77'	Report	Sader 63'

Pampeloponnisiako Stadium, Patras
Attendance: 4,019
Referee: Horacio Elizondo (Argentina)

Quarterfinal

21 August 2004
18:00

Iraq	1 – 0	Australia
E. Mohammed 64'	Report

Pankritio Stadium, Heraklion
Attendance: 10,023
Referee: Carlos Batres (Guatemala)

Semifinal

24 August 2004
21:00

Iraq	1 – 3	Paraguay
Farhan 83'	Report	Cardozo 17', 34'; Bareiro 68'

Kaftanzoglio Stadium, Thessaloniki
Attendance: 6,213
Referee: Éric Poulat (France)

Bronze Medal Match

27 August 2004
20:30

Italy	1 – 0	Iraq
Gilardino 8'	Report

Kaftanzoglio Stadium, Thessaloniki
Attendance: 5,203
Referee: Jorge Larrionda (Uruguay)

== Judo ==
Athlete	Event	Round of 32	Round of 16	Quarterfinals	Semifinals	Repechage 1	Repechage 2	Repechage 3	Final / BM	
Athlete	Event	Opposition Result	Opposition Result	Opposition Result	Opposition Result	Opposition Result	Opposition Result	Opposition Result	Opposition Result	Rank
Hadir Lazame	Men's +100 kg	Ikhsangaliyev (KAZ); L 0000–1000	Did not advance							

== Swimming ==
Men

Athlete	Event	Heat		Semifinal		Final	
Athlete	Event	Result	Rank	Result	Rank	Result	Rank
Mohammed Abbas	100 m freestyle	56.81	63	Did not advance			

== Taekwondo ==
Iraq has qualified one taekwondo jin.

Athlete	Event	Round of 16	Quarterfinals	Semifinals	Repechage 1	Repechage 2	Final / BM	
Athlete	Event	Opposition Result	Opposition Result	Opposition Result	Opposition Result	Opposition Result	Opposition Result	Rank
Raid Rasheed	Men's −80 kg	López (USA); L 0–12	Did not advance		Estrada (MEX); L WO	Did not advance		7

== Weightlifting ==
Iraq has qualified one weightlifter.

Athlete	Event	Snatch		Clean & Jerk		Total	Rank
Athlete	Event	Result	Rank	Result	Rank	Total	Rank
Mohammed Ali Abdul-Moneim	Men's −56 kg	120	=7	135	10	255	10

== See also ==
- Iraq at the 2004 Summer Paralympics
