= Raj Tilak =

Raj Tilak may refer to:

- Rājyābhiṣeka, coronation in India
- Raaj Tilak, a 1984 Indian Hindi-language film starring Raaj Kumar, Sunil Dutt, Dharmendra, Kamal Haasan and Hema Malini
- Raj Tilak (1958 film), an Indian Hindi-language film starring Gemini Ganesan, Padmini and Vyjayanthimala
- Raajtilak, an Indian Bhojpuri-language film
- Raj Joshi Tilak, an Indian Olympic sprinter
- Raj Tilak (director), Hindi film director whose work includes directing Mukti
- Raj Tilak (ichthyologist)
