= Heinz Müller =

Heinz Müller may refer to:

- Heinz Müller (cyclist) (1924–1975), German racing cyclist
- Heinz Müller (footballer, born 1943), German football midfielder
- Heinz Müller (footballer, born 1978), German football goalkeeper (Lillestrom, Barnsley, Mainz)
- Heinz-Fritz Müller (1912–1945), Waffen-SS
- Heinz Müller (athlete) (born 1936), Swiss sprinter
