= Iraq at the 1984 Summer Olympics =

- IOC code: IRQ
- NOC: National Olympic Committee of Iraq

in Los Angeles
- Competitors: 23
- Medals: Gold 0 Silver 0 Bronze 0 Total 0

Summer Olympics appearances (overview)
- 1948; 1952–1956; 1960; 1964; 1968; 1972–1976; 1980; 1984; 1988; 1992; 1996; 2000; 2004; 2008; 2012; 2016; 2020; 2024; 2028

Iraq competed at the 1984 Summer Olympics in Los Angeles, United States.

== Boxing ==
Men's Light flyweight (– 48 kg)

- Abbas Zeghayer (Note: otherwise Abbas Khalaf Zeghayer or Abbas Zaghayer)

- First Round — Lost to William Bagonza (UGA), RSC-2

Men's Lightweight (– 60 kg)

- Samir Khenyab

- Second Round — Lost to Reiner Gies (FRG), 4:1

Men's Light heavyweight (– 81 kg)

- Ismail Salman (Note: otherwise Ismail Khalil Salman)

- Second Round — Lost to Evander Holyfield (USA), RSC-2

== Football ==
- Iraq =13th place

- Group B: drew against Canada 1-1; lost against Cameroon 1-0; lost against Yugoslavia 2-4
- Adnan Dirjal, Ali Hussein Shihab, Emad Jassim, Husam Nima Nasser, Hussain Saeed, Kadhum Mutashar, Karim Saddam, Karim Allawi, Khalil Allawi, Mohammed Fadel, Natik Hashim, Raheem Hamid, Raad Hammoudi, Sadik Musa, Wameedh Munir, Karim Jaafar (DNS), Fatah Nasif (DNS)

== Weightlifting ==
Men's Middleweight (– 75 kg)

- Mohammed Yaseen Mohammed (6th)

Men's Middle heavyweight (– 90 kg)

- Mohammed Taher Mohammed (17th)

== Wrestling ==
Men's Freestyle Bantamweight (– 57 kg)

- Marwan Suhail Abood eliminated (6th place, eliminatory round, Group A)

Men's Freestyle Welterweight (– 74 kg)

- Ali Hussain Faris eliminated (6th place, eliminatory round, Group A)

Men's Freestyle Light heavyweight (– 90 kg)

- Abdul-Rahman Breesam Mohammed eliminated (7th place, eliminatory round, Group B)

Men's Greco-Roman Welterweight (– 74 kg)

- Ali Hussain Faris eliminated (8th place, eliminatory round, Group B)

Men's Greco-Roman Light heavyweight (– 90 kg)

- Abdul-Rahman Breesam Mohammed eliminated (7th place, eliminatory round, Group A)
