= Iraq at the 1980 Summer Olympics =

- IOC code: IRQ
- NOC: National Olympic Committee of Iraq

in Moscow, Soviet Union 19 July–3 August 1980
- Competitors: 45
- Medals: Gold 0 Silver 0 Bronze 0 Total 0

Summer Olympics appearances (overview)
- 1948; 1952–1956; 1960; 1964; 1968; 1972–1976; 1980; 1984; 1988; 1992; 1996; 2000; 2004; 2008; 2012; 2016; 2020; 2024

Iraq competed at the 1980 Summer Olympics in Moscow, USSR. The Middle Eastern nation returned to the Olympic Games after missing the 1972 and 1976 Summer Olympics.

== Results by event ==
=== Athletics ===
Men's 110 m Hurdles

- Abdul Jabbar Rahima

- Heat — 14.89 (→ did not advance)

Men's 4x400 metres Relay

- Hussain Ali Nasayif, Ali Hassan Kadhum, Fahim Abdul Al-Sada, and Abbas Murshid Al-Aibi

- Heat — 3:10.5 (→ did not advance)

Men's 400 m Hurdles

- Ali Hassan Kadhum

- Heat — did not start (→ did not advance)

Men's Triple Jump

- Mujhid Fahad Khalifa

- Qualification — 15.86 m (→ did not advance)

=== Boxing ===
Men's Light Flyweight (48 kg)

- Farid Salman Mahdi
  1. First Round — Bye
  2. Second Round — Lost to Hipolito Ramos (Cuba) on points (0-5)

Men's Flyweight (51 kg)

- Samir Khiniab
  1. First Round — Lost to Hugh Russell (Ireland) on points (0-5)

Men's Featherweight (57 kg)

- Abdulzhava Jawad Ali
  1. First Round — Lost to Ravsal Otgonbayar (Mongolia) on points (1-4)

Men's Light-Welterweight (63,5 kg)

- Farouk Jawad
  1. First Round — Defeated Peter Aydele (Nigeria) on points (5-0)
  2. Second Round — Defeated John Munduga (Uganda) after knock-out in first round
  3. Quarter Finals — Lost to José Aguilar (Cuba) after referee stopped contest in third round

=== Football (soccer) ===
==== Men's team competition ====
- Group Stage
July 21, 1980
12:00

Iraq	3 – 0	Costa Rica
Hadi Ahmed 45'; Hussein Saeed 49'; Falah Hassan 75'	Report

Republican Stadium, Kyiv
Referee: Nyirenda Chayu (Zambia)

July 23, 1980
12:00

Finland	0 – 0	Iraq
	Report

Republican Stadium, Kyiv
Attendance: 40.000
Referee: Ramón Calderón Castro (Cuba)

July 25, 1980
12:00

Yugoslavia	1 – 1	Iraq
Zoran Vujović 63'	Report	Falah Hassan 61'

Dinamo Stadium, Minsk
Referee: André Daina (Switzerland)
- Quarter Finals
July 27, 1980
12:00

East Germany	4 – 0	Iraq
Schnuphase 4' (pen.); Netz 11'; Steinbach 17'; Terletzki 22'	Report

Republican Stadium, Kyiv
Attendance: 48.000
Referee: Romualdo Arppi Filho (Brazil)
- Team Roster

- Fatah Nsaief
- Kadhim Shibib
- Adnan Dirjal
- Hassan Farhan
- Wathiq Aswad
- Ibrahim Ali
- Alaa Ahmed
- Hadi Ahmed
- Abdullah Abdul-Wahid
- Jamal Ali
- Saad Jassim
- Falah Hassan
- Ali Kadhim
- Nazar Ashraf
- Thamir Yousif
- Hussein Saeed
- Adil Khdhayir

- Head Coach: Anwar Jassam

=== Weightlifting ===
Men's 56 kg

- Abdul Karim Gizar – 12th

Men's 60 kg

- Faisal Matloub – 10th

Men's 67.5 kg

- Mohammed Yaseen – 17th

Men's 82.5 kg

- Talal Hassoun – 11th

Men's 110 kg

- Ali Abdul Kader Maneer – 11th

=== Wrestling ===
Men's freestyle 57 kg

- Karim Salman Muhsin – 7th
