= Schaufelberger =

Schaufelberger is a Swiss-German surname. Notable people with the name include:

- Albert Schaufelberger (1949–1983), Lieutenant Commander in the United States Navy
- Heinz Schaufelberger (born 1947), Swiss chess master
- Philipp Schaufelberger (born 1970), Swiss jazz guitarist and composer
- Silvio Schaufelberger (born 1977), Swiss bobsledder
- Werner Schaufelberger (born 1935), Swiss sprinter
