= Aqeel Moften =

Iraqi lawyer and businessman

His Excellency Aqeel Moften

President of National Olympic Committee of Iraq
- Incumbent
- Assumed office 10 February 2024

Personal details
- Born: 29 November 1979 (age 46) Baghdad, Iraq
- Education: University of Baghdad

Aqeel Meften (born 29 November 1979) is an Iraqi lawyer, businessman who has served as the ninth President of the National Olympic Committee of Iraq since 2024.

== Career ==
He is the owner and founder of the Iraqi Union Bank. He has also been the president of the Iraqi Equestrian Federation since 2022. Moften also won membership in the Olympic Council of Asia in 2024.

== See also ==
- Iraq at the Olympics
