= Iraq at the 1988 Summer Olympics =

- IOC code: IRQ
- NOC: National Olympic Committee of Iraq

in Seoul
- Competitors: 31 in 5 sports
- Medals: Gold 0 Silver 0 Bronze 0 Total 0

Summer Olympics appearances (overview)
- 1948; 1952–1956; 1960; 1964; 1968; 1972–1976; 1980; 1984; 1988; 1992; 1996; 2000; 2004; 2008; 2012; 2016; 2020; 2024

Iraq competed at the 1988 Summer Olympics in Seoul, South Korea.

== Competitors ==
The following is the list of number of competitors in the Games.

Sport	Men	Women	Total
Athletics	2	0	2
Boxing	3	–	3
Football	20	–	20
Table tennis	1	0	1
Wrestling	5	–	5
Total	31	0	31

== Results by event ==
=== Boxing ===
Men's Flyweight (– 51 kg)

- Amir Hussain
  1. First Round — Lost to Gamal El-Komy (EGY), 1:4

=== Football (soccer) ===
- Group Stage
September 17, 1988
19:00

Iraq	2 – 2	Zambia
Ahmad Radhi 36' (pen.); Karim Allawi 71'	Report	Stone Nyirenda 44'; Kalusha Bwalya 66'

Hanbat Stadium, Daejeon
Attendance: 29,600
Referee: Jesús Díaz (Colombia)

September 19, 1988
19:00

Iraq	3 – 0	Guatemala
Ahmad Radhi 57'; Mudhafar Jabbar 67'; Rocael Mazariegos 77' (o.g.)	Report

Hanbat Stadium, Daejeon
Attendance: 23,500
Referee: Jean-Fidele Diramba (Gabon)

September 21, 1988
19:00

Iraq	0 – 2	Italy
	Report	Ruggiero Rizzitelli 59'; Massimo Mauro 63'

Dongdaemun Stadium, Seoul
Attendance: 13,000
Referee: Hernán Silva (Chile)
- Team Roster:

- Ahmad Jassim
- Adnan Dirjal
- Hassan Kamal
- Ghanim Oraibi
- Samir Shaker
- Habib Jafar
- Younis Abd Ali
- Ahmad Radhi
- Ismail Mohammed
- Hussein Saeed
- Saad Qais
- Karim Salman
- Karim Allawi
- Basil Gorgis
- Natiq Hashim
- Mudhafar Jabbar
- Laith Hussein
- Radhi Shenaishil
- Salam Hashim
- Emad Hashim

- Head coach: Ammo Baba
