= Iraq at the 1968 Summer Olympics =

- IOC code: IRQ (IRK used at these Games)
- NOC: National Olympic Committee of Iraq

in Mexico City, Mexico 12–27 October 1968
- Competitors: 3 in 3 sports
- Medals: Gold 0 Silver 0 Bronze 0 Total 0

Summer Olympics appearances (overview)
- 1948; 1952–1956; 1960; 1964; 1968; 1972–1976; 1980; 1984; 1988; 1992; 1996; 2000; 2004; 2008; 2012; 2016; 2020; 2024

Iraq competed at the 1968 Summer Olympics in Mexico City, Mexico. Three competitors, all men, took part in four events in three sports.

== Cycling ==
One cyclist represented Iraq in 1968.

Individual road race

- George Artin — DNF (→ no ranking)

== Weightlifting ==
Lightweight

- Zuhair Mansoor

- Press — 122.5 kg
- Snatch — 110.0 kg
- Jerk — 155.0 kg
- Total — 387.5 kg (→ 11th place)

== Wrestling ==
Men's Greco-Roman featherweight (63 kg)

- Ismail Al Karaghouli

- Round 1 — fought Roman Rurua of the USSR
- Round 2 — DNS

Men's freestyle featherweight (63 kg)

- Ismail Al Karaghouli

- Round 1 — fought José García of Guatemala
- Round 2 — fought Todorov Enio of Bulgaria
- Round 3 — fought José Ramos of Cuba
- Round 4 — fought Jozsef Rusznyak of Hungary
