= Patrick Lowry =

Irish sprinter

Personal information
- Nationality: Irish
- Born: 19 December 1936
- Died: 18 September 2014 (aged 77)

Sport
- Sport: Sprinting
- Event: 100 metres

Patrick Lowry (19 December 1936 – 18 September 2014) was an Irish sprinter. He competed in the men's 100 metres at the 1960 Summer Olympics. He was educated at Synge Street CBS.
