= Haider Nawzad =

Iraqi rower (born 1983)

Medal record

Men's rowing

Representing Iraq

Asian Games
Bronze medal – third place	2010 Guangzhou	Single sculls

Haider Nawzad (alternate names: Haydar Nozad, Haidar Hama Rashid) (born 20 April 1983) is an Iraqi rower. He was born in Baghdad to Kurdish parents. He is fluent in Kurdish, Arabic, English, and Swedish.

He and his rowing partner, Hamza Hussein, qualified for the men's double sculls event at the 2008 Summer Olympics in Beijing through a Tripartite Commission invitation. They were last-minute qualifiers for the Beijing Games, obtaining a place when North Korea declined an invitation to send rowers, and the invitation was reallocated to Iraq. They are two of only four competitors on the 2008 Iraqi Olympic team. Nawzad and Hussein train on the Tigris River in central Baghdad. Nawzad was living in Sweden, but returned to Iraq to train for the Olympics.

Haider won Iraq's first medal of the 2010 Asian Games, finishing third in the men's single sculls. After this victory, Adel Ali, Secretary General of Iraq's National Olympic Committee announced that his organisation was committed to providing better funding for sport in Iraq.

Before the Asian Games, Haider and other members of the Iraqi squad spent a month preparing in the United States training with members of the U.S. rowing team and competing in the prestigious Head of the Charles regatta.
