= Boonsong Arjtaweekul =

Thai sprinter

Personal information
- Nationality: Thai
- Born: 2 September 1936 (age 89) Buri Ram, Thailand

Sport
- Sport: Sprinting
- Event: 4 × 100 metres relay

Boonsong Arjtaweekul (born 2 September 1936) is a Thai sprinter. He competed in the men's 4 × 100 metres relay at the 1960 Summer Olympics.
