= Iraq at the 1996 Summer Olympics =

- IOC code: IRQ
- NOC: National Olympic Committee of Iraq
- Website: www.iraqiolympic.org (in Arabic)

in Atlanta
- Competitors: 3 in 3 sports
- Flag bearer: Raed Ahmed
- Medals: Gold 0 Silver 0 Bronze 0 Total 0

Summer Olympics appearances (overview)
- 1948; 1952–1956; 1960; 1964; 1968; 1972–1976; 1980; 1984; 1988; 1992; 1996; 2000; 2004; 2008; 2012; 2016; 2020; 2024

Iraq competed at the 1996 Summer Olympics in Atlanta, United States.

== Competitors ==
The following is the list of number of competitors in the Games.

Sport	Men	Women	Total
Athletics	1	0	1
Shooting	1	0	1
Weightlifting	1	–	1
Total	3	0	3

== Athletics ==
Men
Field events

Athlete	Event	Qualification		Final	
Athlete	Event	Distance	Position	Distance	Position
Hussain Jasim	Triple jump	15.27	41	Did not advance	

== Shooting ==
Men

Athlete	Event	Qualification		Final	
Athlete	Event	Points	Rank	Points	Rank
Hassan Hassan	10 m air pistol	569	44	Did not advance	

== Weightlifting ==
Athlete	Event	Snatch		Clean & jerk		Total	Rank
Athlete	Event	Result	Rank	Result	Rank	Total	Rank
Raed Ahmed	–99 kg	137.5	24	165.0	23	302.5	23
