= Ali Adnan Mohamed =

Iraqi archer

Ali Adnan Mohamed is an Iraqi archer.

He was due to be the first person to represent Iraq in archery at the Olympic Games, having qualified for the 2008 Summer Olympics in Beijing, but the entire Iraqi delegation was banned from the Games by the International Olympic Committee due to Iraqi government interference in the Iraqi national Olympic Committee.

In 2006, he was assaulted by "Al Qaeda affiliated operatives", and subsequently restricted himself to training in his own garden.
