= Iraq at the 1948 Summer Olympics =

- IOC code: IRQ
- NOC: National Olympic Committee of Iraq

in London, United Kingdom 29 July–14 August 1948
- Competitors: 12 in 2 sports
- Medals: Gold 0 Silver 0 Bronze 0 Total 0

Summer Olympics appearances (overview)
- 1948; 1952–1956; 1960; 1964; 1968; 1972–1976; 1980; 1984; 1988; 1992; 1996; 2000; 2004; 2008; 2012; 2016; 2020; 2024; 2028

Iraq competed in the Summer Olympic Games for the first time at the 1948 Summer Olympics in London, England, under the name of the Hashmite Kingdom of Iraq. The country participated in two sports, athletics and basketball, sending a total of 12 athletes.

== Preparation ==
Akram Fahmi led the Iraqi Delegation and arrived weeks before the start of the tournament in order to co-ordinate with the other delegations and the organizing committee and checking the times in which the Iraqi athletes will compete at. According to Nori Ahmed, the head of physical education at the time, in an interview with Time magazine in Baghdad, Iraqi athletes had never set foot outside Iraq, so a short training camp in Damascus was set. A committee of four men, Akram Fahmi, Nori Ahmed, Abdulmajed Al Samar'e, and Father Sylvian chose who will participate in the Olympics. The Iraqi Delegation left Iraq by air on July the 17th 1948 and was welcomed by a representative of the Olympic committee in addition to a representative of the host committee and Akram Fahmi. In the opening ceremony, the delegation wore green jackets with the Iraqi Badge and a white shirts, trousers, and shoes.

== Athletics ==
Iraq sent 2 athletes in their inaugural appearance in Olympics. The Committee chose Salman Ali, a 22 year old who was in the Karkh high school participated in the Men's 100 metres. Salman was in heat seven and finished last, therefore being eliminated in the first round. Ali also participates in the Men's 200 metres race, finishing last in heat four. By participating he became the only Iraqi athlete to ever participate in two different events in the same Olympic games. The committee also chose Labib Hasso, a 20 year old medical student participated in the Men's 400 Meters. He was in heat three and finished last with a time of 56.8, the worst in the entire competition.

== Basketball ==
Iraq were informed by the International Olympic Committee that Iraq were to participate in the basketball event at the 1948 Olympics. Nour Ahmed was chosen as coach of the Iraqi Basketball team and constructed fast-paced practices to prepare the team ahead of the games at Al Mansour's elementary school field. Ahmed Hamed, Emile Yousef, George Hanna, Hashim Abdul-Jalil, Irfan Abdul-Kadir, Kanan Aoni, Salih Faraj, Salman Mahdi Deheh, Salman Ali Daleh and Wadud Khalil Jumaa were the members of the team.

Iraq were In group two alongside Belgium, Chile, China, Philippines, and the South Korea

Iraq's first game was against Philippines and the team wore a white shirt with the word IRAQ printed on it in green with green numbers and white shorts. Hashim Abdul-Jalil scored Iraq's first points in Olympic history. Iraq then lost the game, 102–30.

Iraq went on to lose 100–18 against Chile, 98–20 against Belgium, 120–20 against South Korea and 125–25 against China, then forfeited against Switzerland and lost 77–28 against Italy, meaning that they finished 22nd out of 23 teams and concluded the Iraqi basketball participation in Olympic games to this day, a drought of 76 years as of the 2024 Paris Olympics.
