= Iraq at the 2016 Summer Olympics =

- IOC code: IRQ
- NOC: National Olympic Committee of Iraq
- Website: www.iraqiolympic.org (in Arabic)

in Rio de Janeiro
- Competitors: 23 in 5 sports
- Flag bearer: Waheed Abdul-Ridha
- Medals: Gold 0 Silver 0 Bronze 0 Total 0

Summer Olympics appearances (overview)
- 1948; 1952–1956; 1960; 1964; 1968; 1972–1976; 1980; 1984; 1988; 1992; 1996; 2000; 2004; 2008; 2012; 2016; 2020; 2024

Iraq competed at the 2016 Summer Olympics in Rio de Janeiro, Brazil, from 5 to 21 August 2016. This was the nation's fourteenth appearance at the Summer Olympic Games since its debut in 1948.

The National Olympic Committee of Iraq selected a team of 23 male athletes to compete in six sports at the Games, with the men's football squad staging its Olympic comeback for the first time since 2004. Waheed Abdul-Ridha, Iraq's highest-ranked boxer and world no. 31 in the middleweight division, led the Iraqi team as the nation's flag bearer in the opening ceremony.

Iraq, however, failed to win its first Olympic medal, since the 1960 Summer Olympics in Rome, where Abdul Wahid Aziz took the bronze in men's weightlifting.

== Boxing ==
Iraq has entered one boxer to compete in the men's light welterweight division into the Olympic boxing tournament. Waheed Abdul-Ridha had claimed an Olympic spot with a quarterfinal victory at the 2016 AIBA World Qualifying Tournament in Baku, Azerbaijan.

Athlete	Event	Round of 32	Round of 16	Quarterfinals	Semifinals	Final	
Athlete	Event	Opposition Result	Opposition Result	Opposition Result	Opposition Result	Opposition Result	Rank
Waheed Abdul-Ridha	Men's middleweight	Rodríguez (MEX); L 0–3	Did not advance				

== Football ==
Summary

Key:

- A.E.T – After extra time.
- P – Match decided by penalty-shootout.

Team	Event	Group Stage				Quarterfinal	Semifinal	Final / BM	
Team	Event	Opposition Score	Opposition Score	Opposition Score	Rank	Opposition Score	Opposition Score	Opposition Score	Rank
Iraq men's	Men's tournament	Denmark; D 0–0	Brazil; D 0–0	South Africa; D 1–1	3	Did not advance			12

=== Men's tournament ===
Iraq men's football team qualified for the Olympics with a remarkable victory over the host nation Qatar in the 2016 AFC U-23 Championship bronze medal play-off, signifying the nation's Olympic comeback to the sport for the first time since 2004.

Team roster

The following is the Iraq squad in the men's football tournament of the 2016 Summer Olympics. The team of 18 players was officially named on 14 July.

Head coach: Abdul-Ghani Shahad

No.	Pos.	Player	Date of birth (age)	Caps	Goals	Club
1	GK	Fahad Talib	21 October 1994 (aged 21)	9	0	(Iraq) Al-Quwa Al-Jawiya
2	DF	Ahmed Ibrahim Khalaf*	25 February 1992 (aged 24)	6	0	(United Arab Emirates) Al-Dhafra
3	DF	Hawbir Mustafa	24 September 1993 (aged 22)	0	0	(Netherlands) MVV Maastricht
4	DF	Mustafa Nadhim	23 September 1993 (aged 22)	28	4	(Iraq) Naft Al-Wasat
5	DF	Ali Faez	9 September 1994 (aged 21)	9	1	(Turkey) Çaykur Rizespor
6	DF	Ali Adnan Kadhim	19 December 1993 (aged 22)	10	5	(Italy) Udinese
7	FW	Hammadi Ahmed*	18 October 1989 (aged 26)	0	0	(Iraq) Al-Quwa Al-Jawiya
8	FW	Mohannad Abdul-Raheem	22 September 1993 (aged 22)	15	5	(Iraq) Al-Zawraa
9	MF	Mahdi Kamil	6 January 1995 (aged 21)	26	6	(Iraq) Al-Shorta
10	MF	Ali Husni	23 May 1994 (aged 22)	9	3	(Turkey) Çaykur Rizespor
11	MF	Humam Tariq	10 February 1996 (aged 20)	12	5	(Iraq) Al-Quwa Al-Jawiya
12	GK	Mohammed Hameed Farhan	24 January 1993 (aged 23)	7	0	(Iraq) Naft Al-Wasat
13	FW	Sherko Karim	25 May 1996 (aged 20)	0	0	(Switzerland) Grasshopper
14	DF	Saad Natiq	19 March 1994 (aged 22)	11	1	(Iraq) Al-Quwa Al-Jawiya
15	DF	Dhurgham Ismail	23 May 1994 (aged 22)	12	1	(Turkey) Çaykur Rizespor
16	MF	Saad Abdul-Amir* (c)	19 January 1992 (aged 24)	4	0	(Saudi Arabia) Al-Qadisiyah
17	DF	Alaa Mhawi	3 June 1996 (aged 20)	5	0	(Iraq) Al-Zawraa
18	MF	Amjad Attwan	12 March 1997 (aged 19)	5	2	(Iraq) Al-Shorta

* Over-aged player.

Group play

Pos	Team	Pld	W	D	L	GF	GA	GD	Pts	Qualification
1	Brazil (H)	3	1	2	0	4	0	+4	5	Quarter-finals
2	Denmark	3	1	1	1	1	4	−3	4	Quarter-finals
3	Iraq	3	0	3	0	1	1	0	3	
4	South Africa	3	0	2	1	1	2	−1	2	

Source: Rio2016 & FIFA
Rules for classification: Tiebreakers
(H) Hosts
4 August 2016
13:00

Iraq	0–0	Denmark
	Report (Rio2016); Report (FIFA)

Estádio Nacional Mané Garrincha, Brasília
Attendance: 18,000
Referee: César Ramos (Mexico)

7 August 2016
22:00

Brazil	0–0	Iraq
	Report (Rio2016); Report (FIFA)

Estádio Nacional Mané Garrincha, Brasília
Attendance: 65,829
Referee: Ovidiu Hațegan (Romania)

10 August 2016
22:00

South Africa	1–1	Iraq
Motupa 6'	Report (Rio2016); Report (FIFA)	Abdul-Amir 14'

Arena Corinthians, São Paulo
Attendance: 37,742
Referee: Roddy Zambrano (Ecuador)

== Judo ==
Iraq has qualified one judoka for the men's half-middleweight category (81 kg) at the Games, signifying the nation's Olympic return to the sport for the first time since 2004. Hussein Al-Aameri earned a continental quota spot from the Asian region as the highest-ranked Iraqi judoka outside of direct qualifying position in the IJF World Ranking List of May 30, 2016.

Athlete	Event	Round of 32	Round of 16	Quarterfinals	Semifinals	Repechage	Final / BM	
Athlete	Event	Opposition Result	Opposition Result	Opposition Result	Opposition Result	Opposition Result	Opposition Result	Rank
Hussein Al-Aameri	Men's −81 kg	Bye	Kibikai (GAB); L 000–000 S	Did not advance				

== Rowing ==
Iraq has qualified one boat in the men's single sculls for the Olympics at the 2016 Asia & Oceania Continental Qualification Regatta in Chungju, South Korea.

Athlete	Event	Heats		Repechage		Quarterfinals		Semifinals		Final	
Athlete	Event	Time	Rank	Time	Rank	Time	Rank	Time	Rank	Time	Rank
Mohammed Jasim Al-Khafaji	Men's single sculls	7:25.04	5 R	7:14.38	2 QF	8:29.76	6 SC/D	7:48.31	6 FD	7:03.73	21

Qualification Legend: FA=Final A (medal); FB=Final B (non-medal); FC=Final C (non-medal); FD=Final D (non-medal); FE=Final E (non-medal); FF=Final F (non-medal); SA/B=Semifinals A/B; SC/D=Semifinals C/D; SE/F=Semifinals E/F; QF=Quarterfinals; R=Repechage

== Weightlifting ==
Iraq has qualified one male weightlifter for the Rio Olympics by virtue of a top seven national finish at the 2016 Asian Championships. Meanwhile, an unused women's Olympic spot was added to the Iraqi weightlifting team by IWF, as a response to the vacancy of women's quota places in the individual World Rankings and to the "multiple positive cases" of doping on several nations. The National Olympic Committee of Iraq, however, chose to keep the women's place vacant, allowing the deadline of allocation to pass without selecting a female weightlifter. The team must allocate these places to individual athletes by June 20, 2016.

Athlete	Event	Snatch		Clean & Jerk		Total	Rank
Athlete	Event	Result	Rank	Result	Rank	Total	Rank
Salwan Jassim Abbood	Men's −105 kg	180	8	214	10	394	9

== See also ==
- Iraq at the 2016 Summer Paralympics
