= Raed Ahmed =

Iraqi weightlifter; defector

Personal information
- Nationality: Iraq
- Born: 5 June 1967 (age 57)
- Weight: 98 kg (216 lb)

Sport
- Sport: Weightlifting

Raed Ahmed (born 5 June 1967) is an Iraqi weightlifter. He represented Iraq at the 1996 Summer Olympics in Atlanta, where he was the flagbearer during the opening ceremony. Raed defected to the United States after his event was over.

== Early life and career ==
Raed was born in Basra, Iraq. He attended college and has a degree. He lived in southern Iraq prior to the Olympics.

In 1984, Raed became the Iraqi champion of weightlifting in the 99kg weight class. Uday Hussein, Saddam Hussein's oldest son, was appointed the chairman of the Iraqi Olympic Committee the same year. Uday was known for torturing athletes after failure and Raed repeatedly attempted to lower his expectations, claiming with the help of physicians that he was injured. While he had considered defection at the 1995 World Weightlifting Championships, held in Guangzhou, China, he thought he would be forcibly repatriated if he attempted to do so.

== 1996 Olympics ==
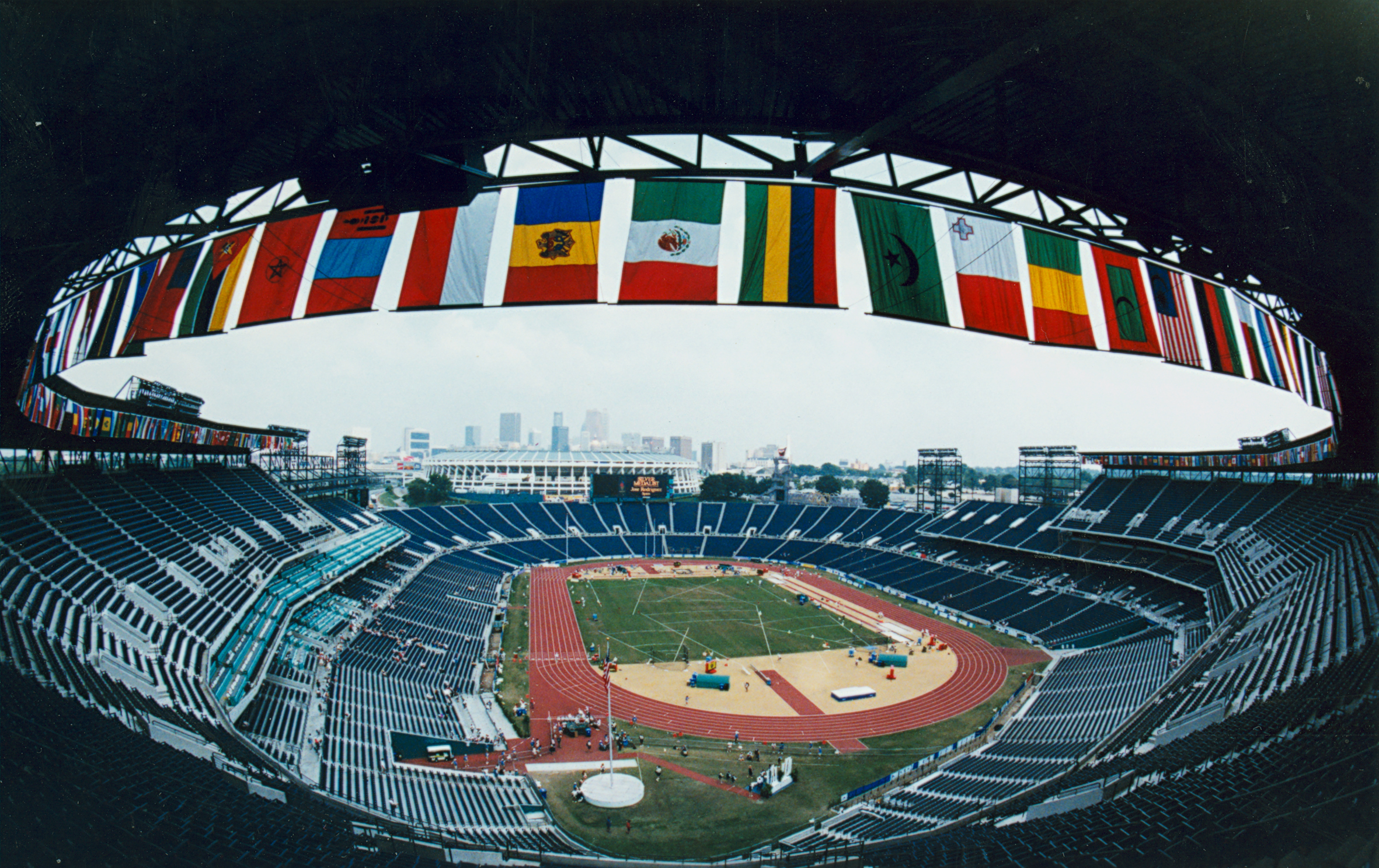
The venue of the Parade of Nations, the Centennial Olympic Stadium, in 1996

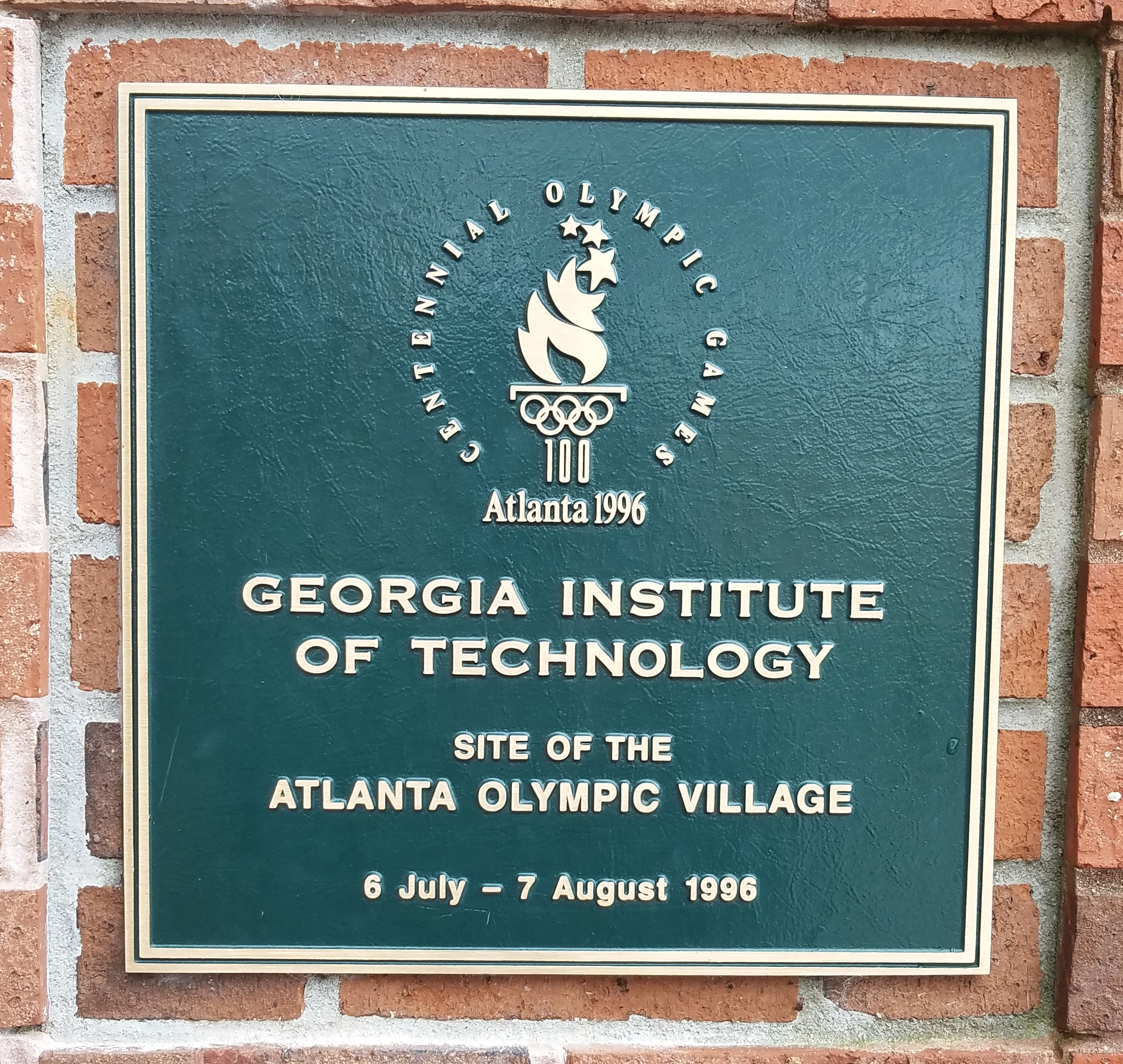
Plaque commemorating the Olympic Village at Georgia Tech

As the flagbearer for Iraq at the opening ceremony in Atlanta, Raed was forbidden from looking at U.S. President Bill Clinton during the Parade of Nations on 19 July 1996. He disobeyed these orders, noticing that Clinton was clapping for the Iraqi delegation; this made him finalise his decision to defect. In his event, he finished in 23rd place, third from the bottom.

At the end of July, (Note: Sources disagree on which day Raed defected. Several contemporary sources published on 2 August 1996 (The Palm Beach Post and Chicago Tribune) state it was "Wednesday", which was 31 July. The Atlanta Journal-Constitution, published the same day, variously states it was "[t]hree mornings ago", which was 30 July, or "Wednesday". A BBC source in 2021 states it was 28 July.) (Note: Sources also disagree what time of day he defected. While The Atlanta Journal-Constitution and BBC states it was in the morning, the Chicago Tribune states it was "a little after noon".) Raed fled from the Olympic Village, which was located at Georgia Tech, while his minders were preparing for a visit to Zoo Atlanta. He was the second member of an Olympic delegation to defect in a week. Prior to his escape, he had arranged to meet a student at the university who had facilitated his getaway. He was brought to Decatur and later met with agents from the Immigration and Naturalization Service to claim asylum.

In a subsequent press conference, Raed stated that he would be executed if he returned to Iraq, having been sentenced to death in absentia. Raed was called a "candle burning for Iraq" by a Kuwaiti journalist recognizing his "act of sacrifice". He said that if the asylum application were approved, he would continue weightlifting and bring his wife to the United States.

== Personal life ==
Raed's wife (Note: The Atlanta Journal-Constitution states her name is Asra Ali Ahmed, while The Waterloo-Cedar Falls Courier states it is Madiha Mohamad.) was evacuated from their house a day before his escape to a "haven in the Kurdish region of northern Iraq". Following his defection, his wife was ordered to divorce him, his mother was fired and family was detained by the government for two weeks and were ostracised upon their release. Raed's wife left Iraq in 1998 and he visited the country in 2004 for the first time since his defection, following the fall of Saddam's government. As of 2021, he lives in Dearborn, Michigan, saying that "Dearborn is like Baghdad" due to the significant Iraqi population following the Iraq War. He has five children, having worked as a used car salesman and football and basketball coach.
