= Bernd Cullmann =

German sprinter (1939–2025)

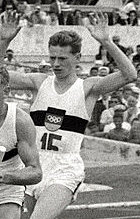
- Cullmann at the 1960 Olympics

Personal information
- Born: 11 October 1939 Idar-Oberstein, Gau Koblenz-Trier, Germany
- Died: 13 January 2025 (aged 85)
- Height: 1.80 m (5 ft 11 in)
- Weight: 71 kg (157 lb)
- Website: www.bernd-cullmann.de

Sport
- Sport: Athletics
- Event: 100 m
- Club: ASV Köln

Achievements and titles
- Personal best: 100 m – 10.4 (1959)
Medal record
Men's athletics
Representing Germany
Olympic Games
Gold medal – first place	1960 Rome	4 × 100 m relay

Bernd Cullmann (11 October 1939 – 13 January 2025) was a West German sprinter who won a gold medal in 4 × 100 m relay at the 1960 Summer Olympics. The German team finished second behind the American team, equaling its own world record of 39.5, but the Americans were later disqualified for an incorrect exchange.

Cullmann was a gem cutter by profession and a national champion in the 50 m indoor in 1960, and in the 60 m indoor in 1961. He was part of the German relay teams that set two world records. His brother Hans was a middle distance runner.

Cullmann died on 13 January 2025, at the age of 85.
