= Pier Giorgio Cazzola =

Italian sprinter

Personal information
- Nationality: Italian
- Born: 4 March 1937 (age 89) Vicenza, Italy
- Height: 1.83 m (6 ft 0 in)
- Weight: 79 kg (174 lb)

Sport
- Country: Italy
- Sport: Athletics
- Event: Sprint

Achievements and titles
- Personal best: 100 m: 10.3 (1959)

Pier Giorgio Cazzola (4 March 1937 – 21 January 2001) was an Italian sprinter, that finished 4th with the national relay team on 4×100 metres relay at the 1960 Olympic Games.

== Biography ==
Cazzola was born in Vicenza. He participated at one edition of the Summer Olympics (1960) and had nine caps in national team from 1957 to 1961.

== Achievements ==
Year	Competition	Venue	Position	Event	Performance	Note
1960	Olympic Games	(Italy) Rome	4th	4 × 100 m relay	40.33	

== See also ==
- Italy national relay team
