= Helga Charlotte Tolle =

German actress, singer and dancer

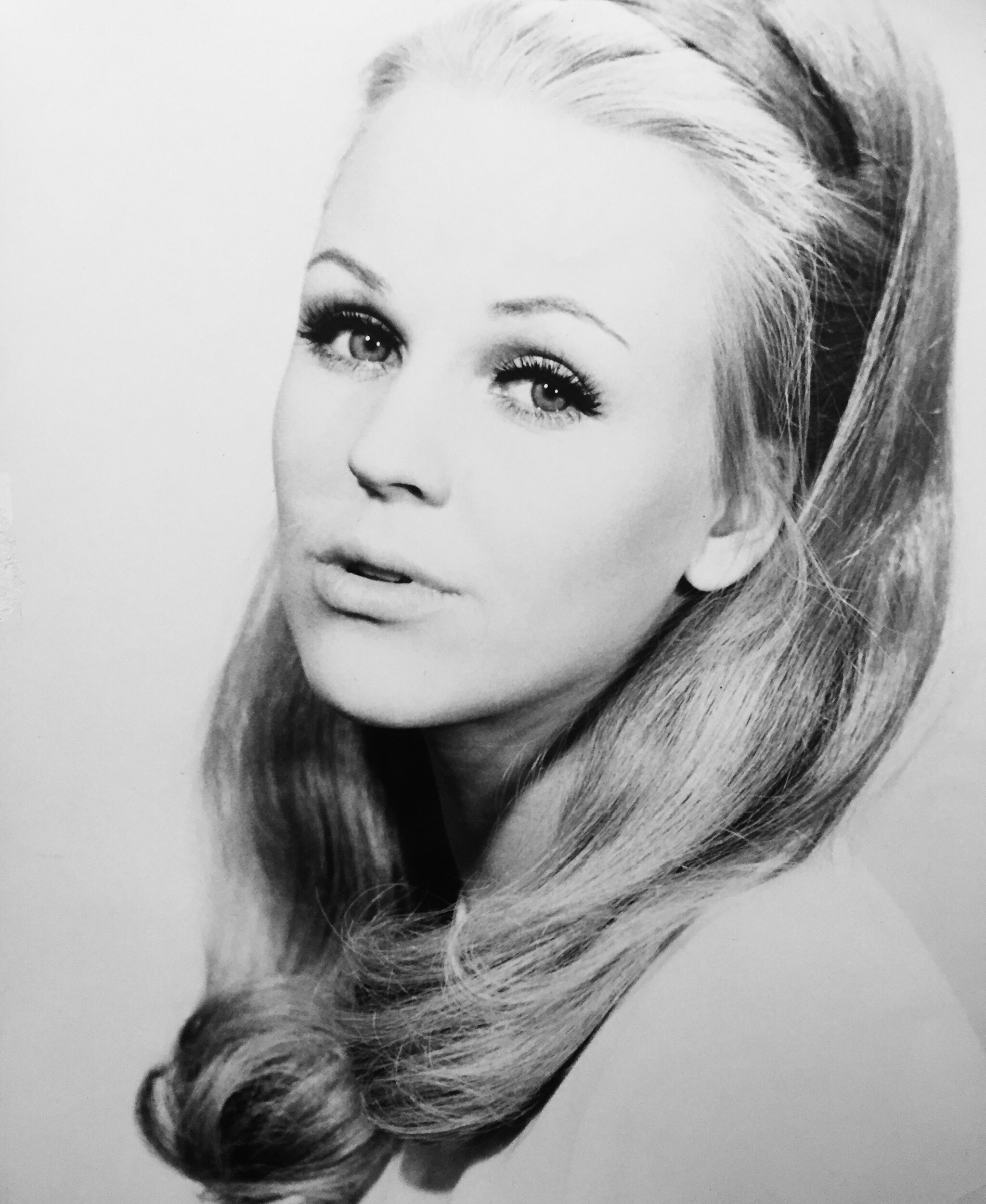
- Helga Tolle in 1968
- Occupations: actress; singer; dancer
- Years active: 1951–2010
- Height: 162 cm (5 ft 4 in)
- Partner: Armin Hary
- Children: one daughter

Helga Charlotte Tolle is a German actress, singer and dancer known for her powerful stage presence and incredible versatility.

== Early life ==
Her parents met when her mother, a ballet dancer, was cast in one of the productions, of the theatre her father owned.

Tolle had her stage debut at the age of three, when she started working at her father's theatre. At first she was only cast because her father wanted to save money by not hiring child actors that he would have to pay. But he soon realised, that his daughter had actual talent and started putting on plays that would best showcase her talents. It wasn't long before Tolle became the star of almost every production.

As a teenager Tolle moved to Berlin to study drama, music and dance at one of the nations leading performing arts schools.

== Career ==
After graduating college as a trained triple threat she started auditioning for jobs and roles in commercials, TV, film, theatre and musicals. She soon booked a role in the musical Hair in which she starred alongside Donna Summer (then Gaines). The musical toured through Europe and had a 300 show run in Munich. Roles in TV and film followed shortly after.

== Personal life ==
Tolle has one daughter with athlete and Olympic gold medallist Armin Hary. She also has one granddaughter.

== Filmography ==
- Die Fastnachtsbeichte (1960)
- Kopfstand Madam! (1967)
- Immer Ärger mit den Paukern / Always trouble with the Teachers (1968)
- Eine wundersame Nacht (1968)
- Eine halbe Stunde (1968)
- Run, Virgin, Run (1970)
- Schwabing so, so - oder so? (1970)
- Lärchenpark (1971)
- Ehen vor Gericht (1972)
- Gestern Gelesen (1973)
- Das feuerrote Spielmobil (1975)
- The Fan (1982)
- Schlaflose Tage (1982)
- Beim Bund (1982)
- Engel auf Rädern (1983)
- Gib Gas - Ich will spass / Hangin’ Out (1983)
- Fritz Golgowsky (1985–1986)
- Anderland (1986)
- Verkehrsgericht (1987)
- Ein naheliegender Mord (1988)
- Forsthaus Falkenau (1992–1994)
