= Iraq at the 2008 Summer Olympics =

- IOC code: IRQ
- NOC: National Olympic Committee of Iraq
- Website: www.iraqiolympic.org (in Arabic)

in Beijing
- Competitors: 4 in 2 sports
- Flag bearer: Hamzah Al-Hilfi
- Medals: Gold 0 Silver 0 Bronze 0 Total 0

Summer Olympics appearances (overview)
- 1948; 1952–1956; 1960; 1964; 1968; 1972–1976; 1980; 1984; 1988; 1992; 1996; 2000; 2004; 2008; 2012; 2016; 2020; 2024; 2028

Iraq competed in the 2008 Summer Olympics, held in Beijing, China, from August 8 to August 24, 2008. As of late July, seven Iraqis—two rowers, a weightlifter, a sprinter, a discus thrower, a judoka and an archer—had qualified to compete in seven events in five sports at the Beijing Olympics, and twenty have qualified to take part in the Beijing Paralympics (see Iraq at the 2008 Summer Paralympics).

On July 24, 2008, it was announced that Iraq would be banned from the 2008 Olympics. After five days of negotiations, the International Olympic Committee lifted the ban. Five of Iraq's seven athletes missed the deadlines for their competitions, though the men's rowing team was allowed to compete by the International Rowing Federation, after North Korea declined the offer of places in rowing and they were re-allocated to Iraq.

Thus, Iraq has four representatives: Haidar Nasir in the discus throw, Dana Hussein in sprinting, and Haidar Nozad and Hamzah Hussein Jebur in men's double scull.

== IOC ban ==
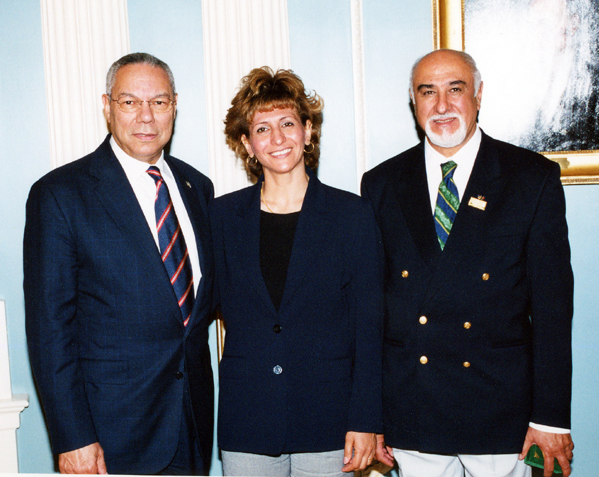
In this 2004 photo, former U.S. Secretary of State Colin Powell stands with then-National Olympic Committee of Iraq executive committee member Dr. Iman Sabeeh, center, and then-newly elected President of the NOCI Ahmad al-Samarra'i.

On July 24, the International Olympic Committee announced that it was banning Iraq from the Olympics due to political influence within Iraq's national Olympic committee. The decision follows the Iraqi government's suspension of the National Olympic Committee of Iraq in May 2008, citing the lack of sufficient members for quorum and the consequent risk of corruption as concerns. The government appointed an acting panel led by Jasem Muhammad Jaafar, the Minister of Sports, in its place. The former chairman, Ahmad al-Samarra'i, the secretary-general and several other members of the committee have been missing after being kidnapped when attending a public meeting in July 2006.

Seven members of Iraq's team had qualified for the Olympics, and received sympathy from the United States after the ban was upheld. White House Press Secretary Dana Perino said, "I'm sure that the Iraqi athletes -- who have trained so hard, and were finally going to represent a country that is free, and sovereign, and working to establish its democracy -- they have to be terribly disappointed and I'm disappointed for the athletes as well." However, if the original committee were to be reinstated, Iraq's track and field team might still be able to compete. Iraq missed the July 23 entry deadlines for archery, judo, rowing and weightlifting, but the deadline for athletics is at the end of July.

On July 29, the IOC reversed their previous decision, ruling that Iraq could now participate in the Olympics, but only the two track and field athletes would be allowed to compete, as the others missed the deadlines for their respective sports. However, the International Rowing Federation allowed the qualified rowers to compete at the Games

== Athletics ==
Iraq planned to send Dana Hussain, a sprinter who had qualified for the 100 and 200 metres. In the wake of the initial ban, despite being consoled by her coach, Abdul Rahman, who assured her that she could compete in the 2012 Olympics, Hussain noted "In this horrible situation, who can say I'll even be alive in 2012?" Dana Hussain is the only athlete on the 2008 Olympic team to train within the war-torn country. In the end she only ran the 100m. Haidar Nasir represented Iraq in the discus throw.

Key

- Note–Ranks given for track events are within the athlete's heat only
- Q = Qualified for the next round
- q = Qualified for the next round as a fastest loser or, in field events, by position without achieving the qualifying target
- NR = National record
- N/A = Round not applicable for the event
- Bye = Athlete not required to compete in round

Men

Athlete	Event	Qualification		Final	
Athlete	Event	Distance	Position	Distance	Position
Haidar Nasser Shaheed	Discus throw	54.19	36	Did not advance	

Women

Athlete	Event	Heat		Quarterfinal		Semifinal		Final	
Athlete	Event	Result	Rank	Result	Rank	Result	Rank	Result	Rank
Dana Hussain	100 m	12.36	6	Did not advance					

== Rowing ==
Haider Nawzad and Hamza Hussein participated in the men's double sculls and finished last of all competitors.

Men

Athlete	Event	Heats		Repechage		Semifinals		Final	
Athlete	Event	Time	Rank	Time	Rank	Time	Rank	Time	Rank
Hamzah Al-Hilfi; Haider Nawzad	Double sculls	7:00.46	5 R	6:52.71	5 FC	Bye		6:52.02	14

Qualification Legend: FA=Final A (medal); FB=Final B (non-medal); FC=Final C (non-medal); FD=Final D (non-medal); FE=Final E (non-medal); FF=Final F (non-medal); SA/B=Semifinals A/B; SC/D=Semifinals C/D; SE/F=Semifinals E/F; QF=Quarterfinals; R=Repechage

== Competitors unable to compete due to the missed deadline ==
Several athletes had qualified either regularly or as wildcards, but did not compete, due to Iraq having missed the entry deadlines for their events.

The country had planned to send an archer to the Olympics for the first time. The nation was awarded a spot in the men's individual competition via Tripartite Commission invitation; Ali Adnan Mohamed would have become Iraq's first Olympic archer, whereas Ali Mohamed Fakher was to participate as a wild card in the judo competition.

In addition to the NOC's suspension, weightlifter Mohammed Jassim was faced with a potential suspension from Olympic participation after news of his failure of a drug test at the Asian Weightlifting Championship were received.

== See also ==
- Iraq at the 2008 Summer Paralympics
