= Prajim Wongsuwan =

Thai novelist and sprinter

- Born: 13 August 1938; Nakhon Ratchasima
- Died: 20 January 1990 (aged 51)
- Occupations: Novelist & sprinter

Prajim Wongsuwan (Thai: ประจิม วงศ์สุวรรณ, 13 August 1938 (Note: Some source give the year 1937.) – 20 January 1990), also known by the pen name Sayumphu Thotsaphon (สยุมภู ทศพล), was a Thai novelist and sprinter.

Prajim Wongsuwan was born in Nakhon Ratchasima. He graduated school from Ratchasima Wittayalai School and subsequently enlisted in the Army Non Commissioned Officer School. Under the army's employment, he competed in the men's 4 × 100 metres relay at the 1960 Summer Olympics. He later left the army (where his highest rank was Sergeant Major 1st class) and later joined paramilitary forces fighting in the Laotian Civil War. He was captured and held captive for two years before being released in 1973. His experience in combat served as inspiration for his numerous war novels, for which he became famous.
