= Ali Salman (athlete) =

Iraqi sprinter

Personal information
- Native name: دلة علي سلمان
- Nationality: Iraqi
- Born: Dallah Ali Salman

Sport
- Sport: Sprinting, basketball
- Events: 100 metres, 200 metres

Dallah Ali Salman (Arabic: دلة علي سلمان) was an Iraqi sprinter and basketball player. Salman would compete for Iraq at the 1948 Summer Olympics, which was making its debut at the Olympic Games, making Salman one of the first Iraqi Olympians. There, he would compete in two sprinting events and was part of the Iraq men's national basketball team in the men's basketball competition.

Salman would compete in the heats of the men's 100 metres and men's 200 metres, though would place last in both events and would not advance to the quarterfinals. In the men's basketball competition, the team would place last during the group stages of the event and would be relegated to a lower placement match. There, they would place 22nd out of the 23 teams that competed.

== Biography ==
Dallah Ali Salman was a sprinter and basketball player who would compete for Iraq at the 1948 Summer Olympics in London, Great Britain. At the 1948 Summer Games, Iraq would make its first appearance at any edition of the Olympics, making Salman one of the first Iraqi athletes to compete at an Olympic Games.

In the sprinting events at the Summer Games, Salman would compete in the men's 100 metres and men's 200 metres. He would first compete in the heats of the former event on 30 July against five other athletes competing in his round. There, he would finish with a time of 11.90 seconds and place last in the round; he would not advance to the quarterfinals. He would then compete in the heats of the latter event on 2 August against five other athletes competing in his round. There, he would again place last in the round; he would not advance ot the quarterfinals.

As part of the Iraq men's national basketball team, he would also compete in the basketball competition at the 1948 Summer Games from 30 July to 12 August. There, the team would compete in the group stages of the event against Belgium, Chile, the Republic of China, the Philippines, and South Korea. The team would be defeated in all their matches and would be relegated to the 17th–23rd classification round. In the round, they would suffer losses from Switzerland and Italy, placing 22nd out of the 23 teams that competed in the event.
