= Moustafa Abdel Kader =

Egyptian sprinter

Personal information
- Nationality: Egyptian
- Born: 1939 (age 86–87) Cairo, Egypt

Sport
- Sport: Sprinting
- Event: 100 metres

Moustafa Mounib Abdel Kader (born 1939) is an Egyptian sprinter. He competed in the men's 100 metres at the 1960 Summer Olympics.
