= Iraq at the 2024 Summer Olympics =

- IOC code: IRQ
- NOC: National Olympic Committee of Iraq

in Paris, France 26 July 2024 – 11 August 2024
- Competitors: 22 (22 men and 0 women) in 5 sports
- Flag bearer (opening): Ali Rubaiawi
- Flag bearer (closing): Ali Rubaiawi
- Medals: Gold 0 Silver 0 Bronze 0 Total 0

Summer Olympics appearances (overview)
- 1948; 1952–1956; 1960; 1964; 1968; 1972–1976; 1980; 1984; 1988; 1992; 1996; 2000; 2004; 2008; 2012; 2016; 2020; 2024

Iraq competed at the 2024 Summer Olympics in Paris from 26 July to 11 August 2024. It was the nation's sixteenth appearance since its debut in 1948 at the Summer Olympics.

== Competitors ==
The following is the list of number of competitors in the Games.

Sport	Men	Women	Total
Athletics	1	0	1
Football	18	0	18
Judo	1	0	1
Swimming	1	0	1
Weightlifting	1	0	1
Total	22	0	22

== Athletics ==
Iraq sent one sprinter to compete at the 2024 Summer Olympics.

Key

- Note–Ranks given for track events are within the athlete's heat only
- Q = Qualified for the next round
- q = Qualified for the next round as a fastest loser or, in field events, by position without achieving the qualifying target
- NR = National record
- N/A = Round not applicable for the event
- Bye = Athlete not required to compete in round

Track events

Athlete	Event	Heat		Repechage		Semifinal		Final	
Athlete	Event	Result	Rank	Result	Rank	Result	Rank	Result	Rank
Taha Hussein Yaseen	Men's 100 m	10.52 PB	9	—		Did not advance			

== Football ==
Summary

Key:

- A.E.T – After extra time.
- P – Match decided by penalty-shootout.

Team	Event	Group Stage				Quarterfinal	Semifinal	Final / BM	
Team	Event	Opposition Score	Opposition Score	Opposition Score	Rank	Opposition Score	Opposition Score	Opposition Score	Rank
Iraq men's	Men's tournament	Ukraine; W 2–1	Argentina; L 1–3	Morocco; L 0–3	3	Did not advance			10

=== Men's tournament ===
Iraq men's football team qualified for the Olympics by winning the third place at the 2024 AFC U-23 Asian Cup in Doha, Qatar.

Team roster

Iraq announced their initial 22-men squad on 26 June 2024.

Head coach: Radhi Shenaishil

No.	Pos.	Player	Date of birth (age)	Caps	Goals	Club
1	GK	Hussein Hassan	15 October 2002 (aged 21)	7	0	(Iraq Football Association) Al-Karkh
2	DF	Josef Al-Imam	27 July 2004 (aged 19)	17	0	(Swedish Football Association) BK Olympic
3	DF	Hussein Ali	1 March 2002 (aged 22)	0	0	(Royal Dutch Football Association) Heerenveen
4	DF	Saad Natiq* (captain)	19 March 1994 (aged 30)	8	0	(Iraq Football Association) Al-Quwa Al-Jawiya
5	DF	Ahmed Maknzi	24 September 2001 (aged 22)	17	1	(Iraq Football Association) Erbil
6	DF	Zaid Tahseen	29 January 2001 (aged 23)	23	2	(Iraq Football Association) Al-Talaba
7	MF	Ali Jasim	20 January 2004 (aged 20)	13	9	(Iraq Football Association) Al-Quwa Al-Jawiya
8	MF	Ibrahim Bayesh*	1 May 2000 (aged 24)	4	0	(Iraq Football Association) Al-Quwa Al-Jawiya
9	FW	Hussein Abdullah	20 January 2001 (aged 23)	16	12	(Iraq Football Association) Al-Talaba
10	FW	Youssef Amyn	21 August 2003 (aged 20)	0	0	(German Football Association) Eintracht Braunschweig
11	MF	Muntadher Mohammed	5 June 2001 (aged 23)	26	3	(Football Federation Islamic Republic of Iran) Mes Rafsanjan
12	GK	Kumel Al-Rekabe	19 August 2004 (aged 19)	10	0	(Iraq Football Association) Naft Al-Basra
13	DF	Karrar Saad	22 March 2001 (aged 23)	20	1	(Iraq Football Association) Al-Talaba
14	MF	Karrar Mohammed	6 January 2001 (aged 23)	22	0	(Iraq Football Association) Al-Talaba
15	MF	Nihad Mohammed	14 January 2001 (aged 23)	17	0	(Iraq Football Association) Al-Talaba
16	MF	Muntadher Abdul-Amir	6 October 2001 (aged 22)	24	1	(Iraq Football Association) Al-Zawraa
17	DF	Mustafa Saadoon	25 May 2001 (aged 23)	17	2	(Iraq Football Association) Al-Quwa Al-Jawiya
18	FW	Aymen Hussein*	22 March 1996 (aged 28)	14	11	(Iraq Football Association) Al-Quwa Al-Jawiya
20	DF	Hussein Amer	28 April 2002 (aged 22)	12	0	(Iraq Football Association) Naft Maysan

* Overage player.

Group play

Pos	Team	Pld	W	D	L	GF	GA	GD	Pts	Qualification
1	Morocco	3	2	0	1	6	3	+3	6 (Note: Head-to-head points: Morocco 3, Argentina 0.)	Advance to knockout stage
2	Argentina	3	2	0	1	6	3	+3	6	Advance to knockout stage
3	Ukraine	3	1	0	2	3	5	−2	3	
4	Iraq	3	1	0	2	3	7	−4	3	

Source: FIFA
Rules for classification: Group stage tiebreakers
Notes:
24 July 2024
19:00

Iraq	2–1	Ukraine
Hussein 57' (pen.); Jasim 75'	Report	Rubchynskyi 53'

Stade de Lyon, Décines-Charpieu
Attendance: 10,637
Referee: Mahmood Ali Ismail (Sudan)

27 July 2024
15:00

Argentina	3–1	Iraq
Almada 14'; Gondou 62'; Fernández 85'	Report	Hussein 45+5'

Stade de Lyon, Décines-Charpieu
Attendance: 30,008
Referee: Espen Eskås (Norway)

30 July 2024
17:00

Morocco	3–0	Iraq
Richardson 19'; Rahimi 28'; Ezzalzouli 36'	Report

Stade de Nice, Nice
Attendance: 19,300
Referee: Ramon Abatti (Brazil)

== Judo ==
Iraq qualified one judoka for the following weight class at the Games. Sajjad Sehen qualified for the games through the allocations of universality places. However, he was suspended on the eve of the opening ceremony due to a positive doping test.

Athlete	Event	Round of 64	Round of 32	Round of 16	Quarterfinals	Semifinals	Repechage	Final / BM	
Athlete	Event	Opposition Result	Opposition Result	Opposition Result	Opposition Result	Opposition Result	Opposition Result	Opposition Result	Rank
Sajjad Sehen	Men's –81 kg	—	DSQ	Did not advance					

== Swimming ==
Iraq sent one swimmer to compete at the 2024 Paris Olympics.

Athlete	Event	Heat		Semifinal		Final	
Athlete	Event	Time	Rank	Time	Rank	Time	Rank
Hasan Al-Zinkee	Men's 100 m butterfly	1:00.23	39	Did not advance			

== Weightlifting ==
Iraq entered one weightlifter into the Olympic competition. Ali Rubaiawi (Men's +102kg) secured one of the top ten slots in his weight divisions based on the IWF Olympic Qualification Rankings.

Athlete	Event	Snatch		Clean & Jerk		Total	Rank
Athlete	Event	Result	Rank	Result	Rank	Total	Rank
Ali Rubaiawi	Men's +102 kg	200 JWR	5	237	6	437 JWR	6
