= Adebayo Oladapo =

Nigerian sprinter

Personal information
- Nationality: Nigerian
- Born: 28 August 1940 (age 85) Ibadan, Oyo, Nigeria
- Died: 13/03/1990 Lagos, Nigeria

Sport
- Sport: Sprinting
- Event: 4 × 100 metres relay

Adebayo Oladapo (born 28 August 1940) is a Nigerian sprinter. He competed in the men's 4 × 100 metres relay at the 1960 Summer Olympics.
