= Armin Hary =

German sprinter (born 1937)

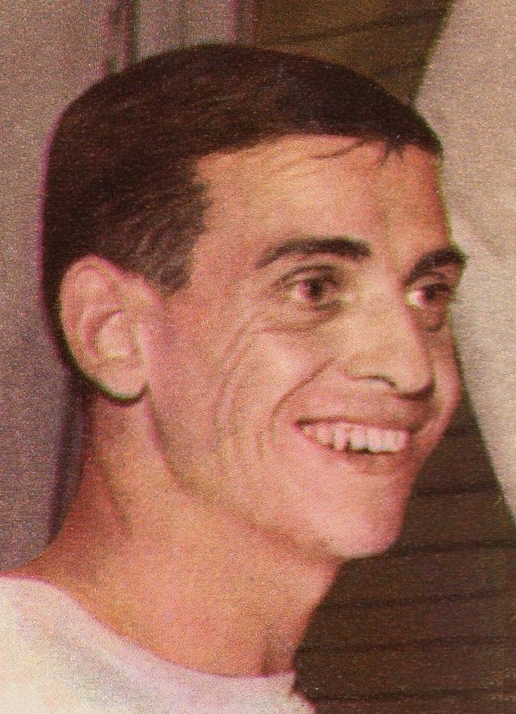
- Armin Hary, c. 1967

Personal information
- Born: 22 March 1937 (age 89)
- Height: 1.82 m (6 ft 0 in)
- Weight: 71 kg (157 lb)

Sport
- Sport: Sprint running

Achievements and titles
- Personal bests: 100 m: 10.0 (1960); 200 m: 20.5; 400 m: 50.6
Medal record
Men's athletics
Representing Germany
Olympic Games
Gold medal – first place	1960 Rome	100 m
Gold medal – first place	1960 Rome	4×100 m
Representing West Germany
European Championships
Gold medal – first place	1958 Stockholm	100 m
Gold medal – first place	1958 Stockholm	4×100 m

Armin Hary (German pronunciation: [ˈaʁmiːn ˈhaːʁi]; (born 22 March 1937) is a retired German sprinter who won the 1960 Olympic 100 meters dash. He was the first non-American to win the event since Percy Williams of Canada took the gold medal in 1928, the only German to ever win the event in the history of the Olympics, the first man to run 100 meters in 10.0 seconds and the last White man to establish a world record in 100 meters dash.

== Early life ==
After playing soccer all throughout his childhood Hary switched to sprinting at age 14. Only a few years later, in 1958, he won his first international title when he came first in the 100 m and the 4 × 100 m at the European Championships.

Also in 1958, Hary appeared to have run a new world record with a time of 10.0 seconds, but the track's slope of 11 centimetres (4.33 in) was found to exceed the maximum allowed 10 centimetres (3.94 in).

== World record ==
On June 21, 1960, at Letzigrund Stadium in Zurich Hary ran into the history books by running the 100 m in 10.0 seconds, a new world record. But the judges were so shocked, they said it must have been a false start. Hary was allowed a repeat run and ran another 10.0 seconds 35 minutes later.

== Olympic Games 1960 in Rome ==
That same year, at the Olympics, he achieved his greatest moment of fame. After a nerve-wracking number of near-starts the six men finally came off the mark together, but within two strides Hary had accelerated to a half-meter lead. By the 50-meter mark Hary opened up a two-meter gap, towards the finish Duke's Dave Sime started closing in, but Hary sprinted to the gold medal in the 100 m dash with a time of 10.2 seconds completing the finest exhibition of sprinting in Olympic history.

Armin Hary also won a 2nd Gold medal in the 4 × 100 m relay when USA was disqualified for an illegal baton pass. Germany's time, 39.5 seconds, equaled their own world record.

== Fastest starter ==
Due to his reaction time and quick acceleration out of the blocks Hary was often accused of jumping or anticipating the gun. Considered the fastest starter in the world, Hary was periodically tested for his quick reaction time, it was discovered that he had extraordinary reflexes. With the help of high speed photography Armin Hary's quick start sequence has been well documented and studied. Long believed to be physiologically impossible Hary's reaction time was recorded at 0.04 seconds compared to the average human's of 0.132 seconds.

The new IAAF false start rule of 0.100 is based on the fact that no human besides Hary has ever been able to react faster to the sound of the gun.

His iconic starts have earned him the nickname “Thief of Starts” from the term “Thief of Hearts”.

== Sponsors ==
He was also the first track star to be affected by the rivalry between Adidas and Puma; each of the two then-fledgling companies wanted the "world's fastest man" to wear its shoes at the 1960 Olympics, putting him right in the middle of the Dassler brother feud. During the companies expensive bidding war for the most famous athlete in the world, Hary realised that neither company had an exclusivity clause in their contract, so without telling the other, he signed with both. Wearing Puma spikes on the track in his 100-meter final and Adidas shoes on the victory stand when receiving his gold medal.

== Personal life ==
In 1966 he married Christina Diana H. Bagusat heiress of the Bagusat fortune, with whom he has two children, his son Armin jr. and his daughter Diana. Hary also has a daughter with acclaimed actress Helga Charlotte Tolle.

== End of career ==
In the early 1960s Hary was forced to retire from sprinting after suffering serious injuries in a car accident.

== Awards and honours ==
- 1960 received a unique medal promised to the first person to run 100 m in 10 sec by Hirohito the emperor of Japan
- 2000 Runner of the Century
- 2000 Athlete of the Century
- 2008 Order of Merit of the Federal Republic of Germany
- 2010 street named after him
- 2011 inducted into the German Sports Hall of Fame.

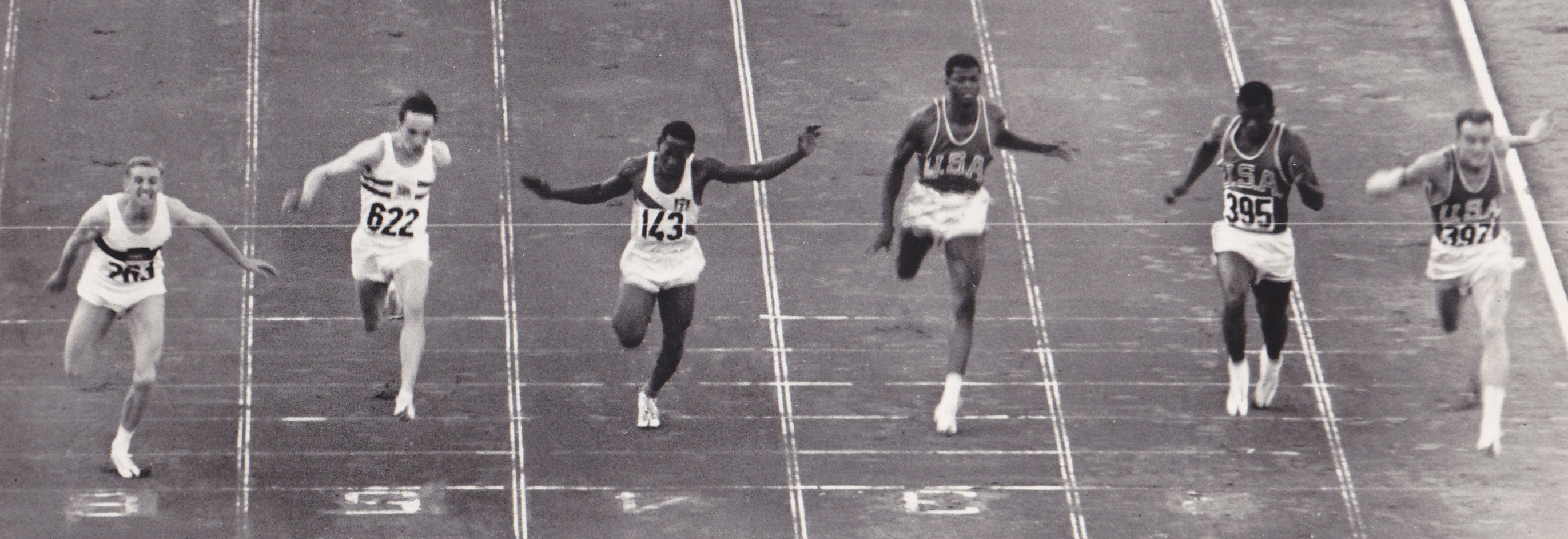
100 m final in the 1960 Olympics. Hary is on the far left in Lane 6.

Records
Preceded by (Italy) Livio Berruti	European Record Holder Men's 100 m 21 June 1960 – 19 June 1968	Succeeded by (France) Roger Bambuck
