= Iraq at the 2020 Summer Olympics =

- IOC code: IRQ
- NOC: National Olympic Committee of Iraq
- Website: www.iraqiolympic.org (in Arabic)

in Tokyo, Japan July 23, 2021 – August 8, 2021
- Competitors: 3 in 3 sports
- Flag bearers (opening): Fatimah Al-Kaabi; Mohammed Al-Khafaji
- Flag bearer (closing): N/A
- Medals: Gold 0 Silver 0 Bronze 0 Total 0

Summer Olympics appearances (overview)
- 1948; 1952–1956; 1960; 1964; 1968; 1972–1976; 1980; 1984; 1988; 1992; 1996; 2000; 2004; 2008; 2012; 2016; 2020; 2024

Iraq competed at the 2020 Summer Olympics in Tokyo. Originally scheduled to take place from 24 July to 9 August 2020, the Games were postponed to 23 July to 8 August 2021, due to the COVID-19 pandemic. This was the nation's fifteenth appearance at the Summer Olympic Games since its debut in 1948.

== Competitors ==
The following is the list of number of competitors in the Games.

Sport	Men	Women	Total
Athletics	1	0	1
Rowing	1	0	1
Shooting	0	1	1
Total	2	1	3

== Athletics ==
Iraq received a universality slot from World Athletics to send a male track and field athlete to the Olympics.

Key

- Note–Ranks given for track events are within the athlete's heat only
- Q = Qualified for the next round
- q = Qualified for the next round as a fastest loser or, in field events, by position without achieving the qualifying target
- NR = National record
- N/A = Round not applicable for the event
- Bye = Athlete not required to compete in round

Track & road events

Athlete	Event	Heat		Semifinal		Final	
Athlete	Event	Result	Rank	Result	Rank	Result	Rank
Taha Hussein Yaseen	Men's 400 m	46:00	6	Did not advance			

== Rowing ==
Iraq qualified one boat in the men's single sculls for the Games by finishing fourth at final-B and securing the fourth of five berths available at the 2021 FISA Asia & Oceania Olympic Qualification Regatta in Tokyo, Japan.

Athlete	Event	Heats		Repechage		Quarterfinals		Semifinals		Final	
Athlete	Event	Time	Rank	Time	Rank	Time	Rank	Time	Rank	Time	Rank
Mohammed Al-Khafaji	Men's single sculls	8:57.01	6 R	7:41.72	2 QF	8:03.55	6 SC/D	7:21.52	4 FD	7:18.65	22

Qualification Legend: FA=Final A (medal); FB=Final B (non-medal); FC=Final C (non-medal); FD=Final D (non-medal); FE=Final E (non-medal); FF=Final F (non-medal); SA/B=Semifinals A/B; SC/D=Semifinals C/D; SE/F=Semifinals E/F; QF=Quarterfinals; R=Repechage

== Shooting ==
Iraq received an invitation from the Tripartite Commission to send a women's air pistol shooter to the Olympics, as long as the minimum qualifying score (MQS) was fulfilled by June 5, 2021.

Athlete	Event	Qualification		Final	
Athlete	Event	Points	Rank	Points	Rank
Fatimah Al-Kaabi	Women's 10 m air pistol	556	51	Did not advance	

== See also ==
- Iraq at the 2020 Summer Paralympics
