= Raj Joshi Tilak =

Indian sprinter

Personal information
- Nationality: Indian
- Born: 1 September 1936 (age 89)

Sport
- Sport: Sprinting
- Event: 100 metres

Raj Joshi Tilak (born 1 September 1936) is an Indian sprinter. He competed in the men's 100 metres at the 1960 Summer Olympics.
