= Gusman Kosanov =

Soviet sprinter (1935–1990)

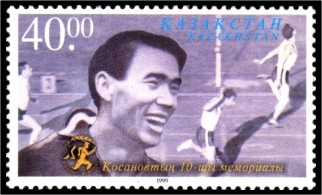
- Kosanov on a 1999 stamp of Kazakhstan

Personal information
- Born: May 25, 1935 Izatulla, Kazakh ASSR, Soviet Union
- Died: July 19, 1990 (aged 55) Alma-Ata, Kazakh SSR, Soviet Union
- Height: 175 cm (5 ft 9 in)
- Weight: 68 kg (150 lb)

Sport
- Sport: Athletics
- Event: 100 m
- Club: Armed Forces Society Alma-Ata

Achievements and titles
- Personal best: 100 m – 10.2 (1962)
Medal record
Men's athletics
Representing the Soviet Union
Olympic Games
Silver medal – second place	1960 Rome	4×100 m relay

Gusman Sittykovich Kosanov (Kazakh: Ғұсман Сыйттықұлы Қосанов, romanized: Ğūsman Syittyqūly Qosanov, Russian: Гусман Ситтыкович Косанов; 25 May 1935 – 19 July 1990) was a Soviet and Kazakh sprinter. He competed for the Soviet Union at the 1960 and 1964 Olympics, in the individual 100 m and 4 × 100 m relay. He failed to reach the individual finals, but won a silver medal in the relay in 1960, becoming the first ethnic Kazakh athlete to win an Olympic medal.

Kosanov took up athletics in 1951. He won the Soviet title in the 4 × 100 m relay in 1960 and placed second in 1964; in the individual 100 m he finished second in 1966 and third in 1963. He retired in 1967 to work as an athletics coach in Kazakhstan. Kosanov hanged himself in July 1990 after he was diagnosed with diabetes and fired from his job as a director of a sports school in Alma-Ata. After his death, an annual athletic meet has been held in Almaty in his honor.
