= Ahmed Abdul-Karim =

Iraqi boxer (born 1992)

Ahmad Abdul-Karim Ahmad (born 28 April 1992 in Baghdad) is an Iraqi boxer. At the 2012 Summer Olympics, he competed in the Men's welterweight, but was defeated in the first round by South African Siphiwe Lusizi.
