= Zuhair Elia Mansour =

Iraqi weightlifter

Personal information
- Nationality: Iraqi
- Born: 7 June 1940 (age 85) Baghdad, Iraq

Sport
- Sport: Weightlifting

Zuhair Elia Mansour (born 7 June 1940) is an Iraqi former weightlifter. He competed at the 1960 Summer Olympics, the 1964 Summer Olympics and the 1968 Summer Olympics.
