= Sebald Schnellmann =

Swiss sprinter

Personal information
- Nationality: Swiss
- Born: 18 July 1936
- Died: 1983 (aged 46–47)

Sport
- Sport: Sprinting
- Event: 200 metres

Sebald Schnellmann (18 July 1936 – 1983) was a Swiss sprinter. He competed in the men's 200 metres at the 1960 Summer Olympics.
