= Peter Laeng =

Swiss sprinter (born 1942)

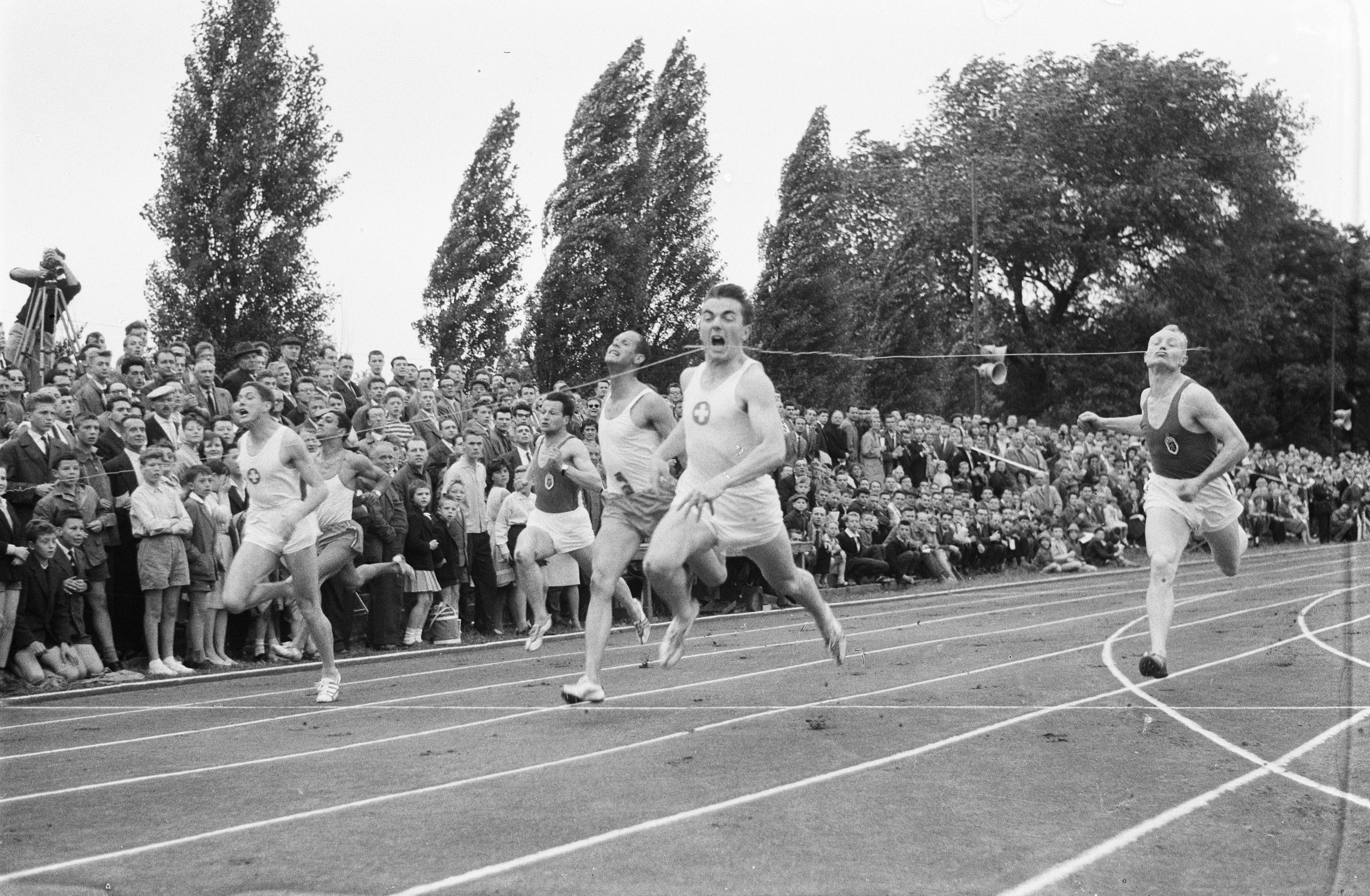

Peter Laeng (born 29 March 1942) is a retired Swiss sprinter who specialized in the 100, 200 and 400 metres.

He was born in Zürich and represented the club LC Zürich. He competed in 200 metres and 4 × 100 metres relay at the 1960 Summer Olympics, and in 400 metres and 4 × 400 metres relay at the 1964 Summer Olympics. He did not reach the final on either occasion.

He became Swiss 100 metres champion in 1961 and 1962, 200 metres champion in 1961, 1962 and 1964 and 400 metres champion in 1964.1960. His personal best times were 10.4 seconds in the 100 metres (1961); 20.7 seconds in the 200 metres (1962); and 45.7 seconds in the 400 metres (1962).
