= Iraq at the Olympics =

- IOC code: IRQ
- NOC: National Olympic Committee of Iraq
- Website: www.nociraq.iq (in Arabic and English)
- Medals Ranked 151st: Gold 0 Silver 0 Bronze 1 Total 1

Summer appearances
- 1948; 1952–1956; 1960; 1964; 1968; 1972–1976; 1980; 1984; 1988; 1992; 1996; 2000; 2004; 2008; 2012; 2016; 2020; 2024

Iraq first participated at the Olympic Games in 1948. It was absent from the 1952 Summer Olympics and boycotted the 1956 games over opposition to the Suez Crisis. Iraq returned to win a Bronze medal at the 1960 Summer Olympics in Rome. After participating in the next three games, it did not take part in the 1972 and 1976 games to boycott apartheid South Africa. Iraq was one of the non-African countries that joined the 1976 boycott, the others being Afghanistan, Albania, Burma (Myanmar), Guyana, Sri Lanka and Syria. Since 1980, Iraq has appeared in every games.

On April 9, 2003, the National Olympic Committee of Iraq building in Baghdad was damaged in looting and fires from looters. Iraq's Olympic program recovered in time to compete in the Athens Olympics the following year, and the Iraq football team almost won a bronze medal but were defeated by Italy in the bronze medal match. Iraq has never competed at the Winter Olympic Games.

Iraq has only won one medal since they have entered the games. They won a bronze medal, in weightlifting at the 1960 Summer Olympics.

It has been represented by National Olympic Committee of Iraq since entering.

== Medal tables ==
=== Medals by Summer Games ===
Games	Athletes	Gold	Silver	Bronze	Total	Rank
1948 London	12	0	0	0	0	–
1952 Helsinki	did not participate					
1956 Melbourne	did not participate					
1960 Rome	21	0	0	1	1	41
1964 Tokyo	13	0	0	0	0	–
1968 Mexico City	3	0	0	0	0	–
1972 Munich	did not participate					
1976 Montreal	did not participate					
1980 Moscow	43	0	0	0	0	–
1984 Los Angeles	23	0	0	0	0	–
1988 Seoul	27	0	0	0	0	–
1992 Barcelona	8	0	0	0	0	–
1996 Atlanta	3	0	0	0	0	–
2000 Sydney	4	0	0	0	0	–
2004 Athens	24	0	0	0	0	–
2008 Beijing	4	0	0	0	0	–
2012 London	8	0	0	0	0	–
2016 Rio de Janeiro	24	0	0	0	0	–
2020 Tokyo	3	0	0	0	0	–
2024 Paris	22	0	0	0	0	–
2028 Los Angeles	future event					
2032 Brisbane	future event					
Total		0	0	1	1	151

=== Medals by sport ===
Sport	Gold	Silver	Bronze	Total
Weightlifting	0	0	1	1
Totals (1 entries)	0	0	1	1

== List of medalists ==
Medal	Name	Games	Sport	Event
(bronze) Bronze	Abdul-Wahid Aziz	1960 Rome	Weightlifting	Men's Lightweight

== See also ==
- Iraq at the Paralympics
- List of flag bearers for Iraq at the Olympics
