= Werner Schaufelberger =

Swiss sprinter

Personal information
- Nationality: Swiss
- Born: 12 January 1935 (age 91)

Sport
- Sport: Sprinting
- Event: 4 × 100 metres relay

Werner Schaufelberger (born 12 January 1935) is a Swiss sprinter. He competed in the men's 4 × 100 metres relay at the 1960 Summer Olympics.
