= Falih Fahmi =

Iraqi sprinter

Falih Akram Fahmi
Personal information
- Nationality: Iraqi
- Born: 23 May 1940 Baghdad, Kingdom of Iraq
- Died: 25 January 1989 (age 48) Abu Ghraib prison, Ba'athist Iraq

Sport
- Sport: Sprinting
- Event: 200 metres
- League: Summer Olympic Games
- Club: Iraqi Olympic Team

Falih Akram Fahmi (1940 – 25 January 1989) was an Iraqi military officer and sprinter. He competed in the men's 200 metres and men's 4 × 100 metres relay at the 1960 Summer Olympics. He fought in the Iran–Iraq War and worked for Saddam Hussein, the former president of Iraq, and was reportedly tortured in the Abu Ghraib prison and later executed for allegedly disparaging Saddam Hussein.
