= Frank Budd =

American sprinter and football player (1939–2014)

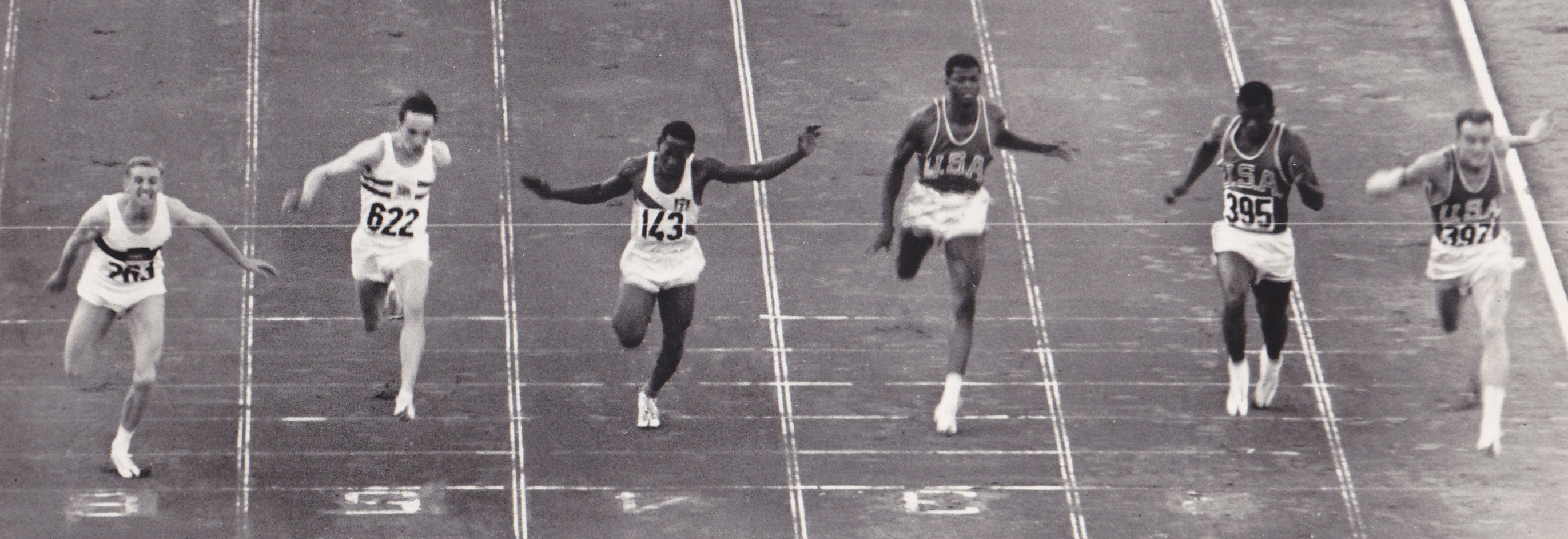

No. 20, 71
- Positions: Wide receiver, Return specialist

Personal information
- Born: July 20, 1939; Long Branch, New Jersey, U.S.
- Died: April 29, 2014 (aged 74); Marlton, New Jersey, U.S.
- Listed height: 5 ft 10 in (1.78 m)
- Listed weight: 187 lb (85 kg)

Career information
- High school: Asbury Park (Asbury Park, New Jersey)
- College: Villanova (1958-1961)
- NFL draft: 1962: 7th round, 96th overall pick

Career history
- Philadelphia Eagles (1962); Washington Redskins (1963); Calgary Stampeders (1965–1966)

Career NFL statistics
- Receptions: 10
- Receiving yards: 236
- Touchdowns: 1
- Stats at Pro Football Reference

Francis Joseph Budd (July 20, 1939 – April 29, 2014) was an American professional football wide receiver in the National Football League (NFL) for the Philadelphia Eagles and the Washington Redskins. Budd was an Olympic athlete who competed in the 1960 Summer Olympics in Rome, where he finished fifth in the finals of the 100 meter event and was part of the team that finished first in the 4×100 meter relay before being disqualified on a baton pass. He set the world record in the 100-yard dash with a time of 9.2 seconds in 1961, breaking the record that had been set by Mel Patton in 1948.

== Early life ==
Budd was born in Long Branch, New Jersey. He played high school football at Asbury Park High School in Asbury Park.

He ran track at Villanova University but never played a down of college football. At Villanova he was coached by their legendary track coach James 'Jumbo' Elliott.

Amazingly. Budd achieved his success despite a deformed right calf, the legacy of a childhood disease, possibly polio.

== Track career ==
Budd was considered the world's best 100 y/m sprinter in 1961. That year, he was to equal the world record for 100 y at 9.3 s, set a new world record at 9.2 s for that distance, and was a member of a team that set a world record in the 4 × 100 m relay of 39.1 s.

The next year, 1962, he equaled the world record for 200 m/220 y on a straight track of 20.0 s.

=== 1960 Rome Olympics ===
Budd had finished second behind Ray Norton in the United States Olympic trials at 100 m in a closely fought contest between the first four finishers, all recording the same time of 10.4 s. At the Olympics themselves, Budd was to finish fifth in the final with perhaps his inexperience at major championships telling against him.

Budd was to experience further disappointment in the 4 × 100 m relay. The United States team (of Budd-Norton-Stone Johnson-Dave Sime) finished first in a world record time of 39.4 s but were disqualified because the at the first exchange from Budd to Norton, Norton started too early and the exchange happened outside the changeover box. The West German team who finished second in 39.5 s received the gold medals and became the new world record holders.

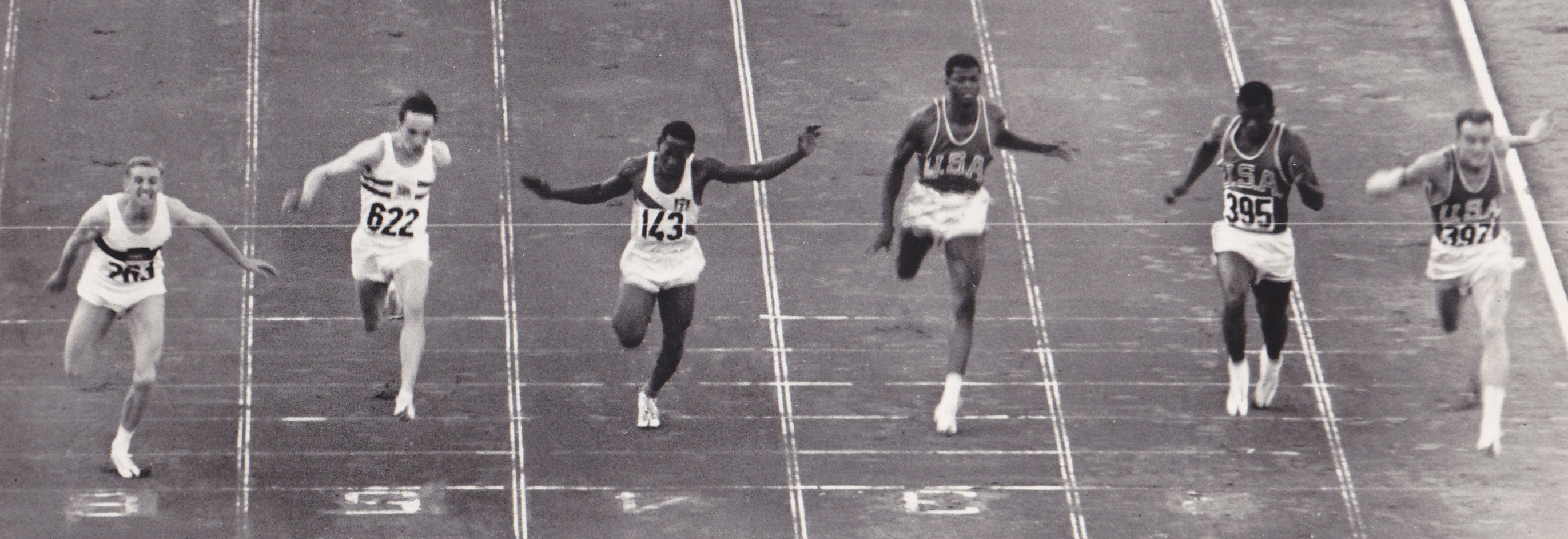
100 m final at the 1960 Olympics, Budd is 2nd from right

=== World records ===
In 1961, Budd was to equal twice the then world record for 100 y of 9.3 s:

- on 6 May in Villanova;
- on June 11 in Villanova (Note: this time was never ratified.)

This record had stood since 1948 having first been set by Mel Patton and subsequently equaled by 12 other athletes.

Then on June 24, 1961, Budd became the first man to run the 100 y in 9.2 s. He was competing in the AAU Championships at Downing Stadium in New York City.

On July 15, 1961, in a dual USA-USSR meet, Budd was a member of team that set a new world record for the 4 × 100 m relay of 39.1 s.

The next year, 1962, he equaled the world record for 200 m/220 y on a straight track of 20.0 s. It is claimed that Budd, feeling a twinge in a muscle, was easing-up the last 70 m.

=== Rankings ===
Budd was ranked among the best in the US and the world in both the 100 and 200 m sprint events during the period 1960–62, according to the votes of the experts of Track and Field News.

100 meters
Year	World rank	US rank
1960	9th	4th
1961	1st	1st
1962	4th	2nd

200 meters
Year	World rank	US rank
1960	–	–
1961	5th	1st
1962	7th	2nd

=== USA Championships ===
Budd achieved notable success at the AAU championships, the USA national championships.

USA Championships
Year	100y	220y
1960	4th	–
1961	1st	3rd

== American football career ==
Budd was drafted by the Philadelphia Eagles in the seventh round of the 1962 NFL draft and played for the Eagles in 1962 as a wide receiver. He played for the Washington Redskins in 1963 before switching to the Canadian Football League, where he played for the Calgary Stampeders in 1965 and 1966.

Budd had both sporting and financial reasons for giving up the chance of further glory on the track for the possibility of glory and wealth on the football field; as his wife, Barbera, has stated, "...you've got to remember that Frank loved football, too,....He didn't think it was a mistake at all. There was no money available then in track. He'd been a terrific player at Asbury Park, and he thought, with all his speed (despite no college football experience), he'd have a long career in the NFL.".

== Honors ==
In 1995, Budd was one of the seven former Villanova athletes chosen to be a member of the first induction class of the Villanova Wall of Fame.

== Later life ==
Budd has been reported to have worked in later life for the New Jersey Department of Corrections and retired in 2002.

A resident of Mount Laurel, New Jersey, Budd died on April 29, 2014, in the Marlton section of Evesham Township, New Jersey. He was 74.
