= Noor Al-Ameri =

Iraqi sports shooter

Personal information
- Full name: Noor Amer Al-Ameri
- Nationality: (Iraq) Iraqi
- Born: January 12, 1994 (age 32) Karbala, Iraq

Sport
- Country: Iraq
- Sport: Shooting
- Event: 10 metre air pistol

Achievements and titles
- Olympic finals: London 2012 (Qualification)

Noor Amer Al-Ameri (born 12 January 1994) is an Iraqi competitive shooter. At the 2012 Summer Olympics, she competed in the Women's 10 metre air pistol.
