= Hamza Hussein =

Iraqi rower (born 1976)

Hamzah Hussein Jebur Al-Hilfi (born 1976) is an Iraqi rower. He and his rowing partner Haider Nawzad qualified for the men's double sculls event at the 2008 Summer Olympics in Beijing through a Tripartite Commission invitation. They were last-minute qualifiers for the Beijing Games, obtaining a place when North Korea declined an invitation to send rowers, and the invitation was reallocated to Iraq. They are two of only four competitors on the 2008 Iraqi Olympic team. Hussein and Nawzad train on the Tigris river in central Baghdad.

Hussein competed in the men's four at the 2010 Asian Games. Before the Games he and other members of the Iraqi rowing squad spent a month preparing in the U.S. where they trained with the U.S. squad and competed in the prestigious Head of the Charles regatta.

Hussein and his rowing partner Nawzad are being tracked in the run up to London 2012 for the BBC's "World Olympic Dreams".
