= Iraq at the 1960 Summer Olympics =

- IOC code: IRQ (IRK used at these Games)
- NOC: National Olympic Committee of Iraq

in Rome, Italy 25 August–11 September 1960
- Competitors: 21 in 5 sports
- Medals Ranked 41st: Gold 0 Silver 0 Bronze 1 Total 1

Summer Olympics appearances (overview)
- 1948; 1952–1956; 1960; 1964; 1968; 1972–1976; 1980; 1984; 1988; 1992; 1996; 2000; 2004; 2008; 2012; 2016; 2020; 2024

Iraq competed at the 1960 Summer Olympics in Rome, Italy. 21 competitors, all men, took part in 23 events in 5 sports. Abdul Wahid Aziz won the nation's only Olympic medal.

== Medalists ==
=== Bronze ===
Abdul Wahid Aziz – weightlifting, men's lightweight

== Boxing ==
Lightweight

- Taha Abdul Karim (=17th)

Light welterweight

- Khalid Al-Karkhi (Note: also competed at the 1964 Summer Olympics) (=9th)

== Cycling ==
Two cyclists represented Iraq in 1960.

Individual road race

- Mahmood Munim
- Hamid Oraibi
