= Stone Johnson =

American sprinter and football player (1940–1963)

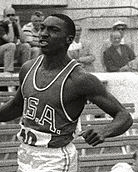
- Johnson at the 1960 Olympics

No. 33
- Position: Running back

Personal information
- Born: April 26, 1940; Dallas, Texas, U.S.
- Died: September 8, 1963 (aged 23); Wichita, Kansas, U.S.
- Listed height: 6 ft 1 in (1.85 m)
- Listed weight: 180 lb (82 kg)

Career information
- High school: James Madison (Dallas, Texas)
- College: Grambling
- AFL draft: 1963: 14th round, 105th overall pick

Career history
- Kansas City Chiefs (1963)*
- * Offseason or practice squad member only

Awards and highlights
- Kansas City Chiefs No. 33 retired

Stone Edward Johnson (April 26, 1940 — September 8, 1963) was an American sprinter and professional football player. Selected 105th overall in the 1963 American Football League draft out of Grambling College, he was a kick returner and running back for the Kansas City Chiefs during the 1963 preseason. Three years earlier at age twenty, Johnson was a 200-meter finalist in the 1960 Summer Olympics in Rome and was also a brief world record holder.

In the Chiefs' fifth and final preseason game on August 31 against the Houston Oilers in Wichita, Kansas, rookie Johnson suffered a fractured vertebra in his neck while blocking during a first quarter kickoff return. Rushed to St. Francis Hospital in Wichita for immediate surgery, he died there eight days later at the age of 23. Although he was only on the team's active roster during preseason, his jersey number 33 was retired.

== See also ==
- List of American Football League players
- List of gridiron football players who died during their careers
