= Mohammed Yaseen =

Iraqi weightlifter (1963–2020)

Mohammed Yaseen Mohammed

Personal information
- Nationality: Iraqi
- Born: 7 January 1963 Erbil, Iraq
- Died: 24 June 2020 (aged 57) Örebro, Sweden

Sport
- Sport: Weightlifting

Mohammed Yaseen Mohammed (Arabic: محمد ياسين محمد) (7 January 1963 – 24 June 2020) was an Iraqi weightlifter. He competed at the 1980 Summer Olympics and the 1984 Summer Olympics.

On 24 June 2020, he died in Sweden after suffering from a COVID-19 infection during the COVID-19 pandemic in Sweden.
