= Heinz Müller (athlete) =

Swiss sprinter (born 1936)

Personal information
- Nationality: Swiss
- Born: 1 February 1936 (age 90)

Sport
- Sport: Sprinting
- Event: 100 metres

Heinz Müller (born 1 February 1936) is a Swiss sprinter. He competed in the men's 100 metres at the 1960 Summer Olympics.
