= Hadir Lazame =

Iranian judoka

Personal information
- Full name: Hadir Ali Lazame
- Nationality: Iraq
- Born: 1 July 1975 (age 51) Baghdad, Iraq
- Occupation: Judoka
- Height: 1.90 m (6 ft 3 in)
- Weight: 118 kg (260 lb)

Sport
- Sport: Judo
- Event: +100 kg
- Club: Iraqi Sports Youth Club
- Coached by: Radi Radi

Profile at external databases
- JudoInside.com: 34053

Hadir Ali Lazame (Arabic: حيدر علي لازم; born 1 July 1975 in Baghdad) is a retired Iraqi judoka, who competed in the men's heavyweight category. He represented Iraq at the 2004 Summer Olympics, and has been training throughout his sporting career both in Syria and in Japan as part of the government’s efforts to support the nation's reconstruction process from the war.

Lazame qualified for the men's heavyweight class (+100 kg) at the 2004 Summer Olympics in Athens by receiving a wild card entry slot from the International Judo Federation. He ousted early in the opening match to Kazakhstan's Yeldos Ikhsangaliyev, who directly scored an ippon and an uchi mata within a short span of nine seconds. Lazame was also appointed as an Iraqi flag bearer by the National Olympic Committee in the opening ceremony.
