= Khudhir Zalata =

Iraqi sprinter

Personal information
- Nationality: Iraqi
- Born: 26 September 1938 Baghdad, Iraq
- Died: 2013 (aged 74–75)

Sport
- Sport: Sprinting
- Event: 100 metres

Khudhir Zalata (26 September 1938 – 2013) was an Iraqi sprinter. He competed in the 100 metres at the 1960 Summer Olympics and the 1964 Summer Olympics and men's 4 × 100 metres relay at the 1960 Summer Olympics.
