= National Olympic Committee of Iraq =

- Country: Iraq
- Code: IRQ
- Created: 1948 (original); 2004 (reconstituted)
- Recognized: 1948
- Continental Association: OCA
- Headquarters: Baghdad, Iraq
- President: Aqeel Moften
- Secretary General: Haytham Abdulhamid
- Website: official website

The National Olympic Committee of Iraq (NOCI; Arabic: اللجنة الاولمبية الوطنية العراقية; IOC Code: IRQ) is the National Olympic Committee (NOC) for Iraq. It was established in 1948 and recognized by the International Olympic Committee that same year.

After the invasion of Iraq, it was officially dissolved in May 2003 by L. Paul Bremer under Coalition Provisional Authority Order Number 2, but was reestablished in February 2004 with the assistance of the International Olympic Committee.

Its current president is Aqeel Moften and director general is Haytham Abdulhamid.

The committee organizes the Iraqi participation in the Olympic Games, choose the participants and run the training program. It has 16 Olympic national federations members and 7 by the IOC national federations members.

== See also ==
- Iraq at the Olympics
