= Boxing at the 1980 Summer Olympics – Featherweight =

Boxing competitions

Featherweight boxing at the Games of the XXII Olympiad
- Venue: Olympiysky Sports Complex
- Date: 20 July – 2 August 1980
- Competitors: 35 from 35 nations

Medalists
1st place, gold medalist(s)		Rudi Fink	East Germany
2nd place, silver medalist(s)		Adolfo Horta	Cuba
3rd place, bronze medalist(s)		Viktor Rybakov	Soviet Union
3rd place, bronze medalist(s)		Krzysztof Kosedowski	Poland

The featherweight boxing competition at the 1980 Olympic Games in Moscow was held from 20 July to 2 August at the Olympiysky Sports Complex. 35 boxers from 35 nations competed.

== Schedule ==
Date	Time	Round
Sunday, 20 July 1980	12:00; 18:00	Round of 64
Thursday, 24 July 1980	12:00; 18:00	Round of 32
Monday, 28 July 1980	12:00; 18:00	Round of 16
Wednesday, 30 July 1980	19:00	Quarterfinals
Thursday, 31 July 1980	19:00	Semifinals
Saturday, 2 August 1980	15:00	Final

== Results ==
=== Finals ===
Semifinals
Adolfo Horta (CUB)	WO
Krzysztof Kosedowski (POL)
Viktor Rybakov (URS)	1
Rudi Fink (GDR)	4

Final
Adolfo Horta (CUB)	1
Rudi Fink (GDR)	4

=== Round of 64 ===
	Result	
Rudi Fink (GDR)	5–0	Hannu Kaislama (FIN)
Carlos González (MEX)	5–0	Nidal Haddad (SYR)
Ali Abdul Zahra Jawad (IRQ)	1–4	Ravsal Otgonbayar (MGL)

=== Top half ===
Round of 32
Odd Bengtsson (SWE)	0
Adolfo Horta (CUB)	5
Titi Cercel (ROU)	5
Róbert Gönczi (HUN)	0
Fitzroy Brown (GUY)	5
Abílio Cabral (ANG)	0
Luis Pizarro (PUR)	RSC
Jean-Pierre Mbereke-Baban (CMR)
Narendra Poma (NEP)
Sidnei dal Rovere (BRA)	RSC
Leoul Neeraio (ETH)	3
Ramy Zialor (SEY)	2
Ku Yong-jo (PRK)	0
Krzysztof Kosedowski (POL)	5
Miroslav Šandor (TCH)	0
Dejan Marović (YUG)	5

Round of 16
Adolfo Horta (CUB)	5
Titi Cercel (ROU)	0
Fitzroy Brown (GUY)	0
Luis Pizarro (PUR)	5
Sidnei Dal Rovere (BRA)	5
Leoul Neeraio (ETH)	0
Krzysztof Kosedowski (POL)	4
Dejan Marović (YUG)	1

Quarterfinals
Adolfo Horta (CUB)	5
Luis Pizarro (PUR)	0
Sidnei Dal Rovere (BRA)	0
Krzysztof Kosedowski (POL)	5

Semifinals
Adolfo Horta (CUB)	WO
Krzysztof Kosedowski (POL)

=== Bottom half ===
Round of 32
Antonio Esparragoza (VEN)	1
Peter Hanlon (GBR)	4
Viktor Rybakov (URS)	5
Daniel Londas (FRA)	0
Anicet Sambo (MAD)
Barthelémy Adoukonu (BEN)	DSQ
William Azanor (NGR)
Tsacho Andreykovski (BUL)	KO
Winfred Kabunda (ZAM)	RSC
Takto Youtiya Homrasmy (LAO)
Barry McGuigan (IRL)	RSC
Issack Mabushi (TAN)
Esmail Mohammad (AFG)
Rudi Fink (GDR)	KO
Carlos González (MEX)	3
Ravsal Otgonbayar (MGL)	2

Round of 16
Peter Hanlon (GBR)	0
Viktor Rybakov (URS)	5
Barthelémy Adoukonu (BEN)
Tsacho Andreykovski (BUL)	KO
Winfred Kabunda (ZAM)	4
Barry McGuigan (IRL)	1
Rudi Fink (GDR)	KO
Carlos González (MEX)

Quarterfinals
Viktor Rybakov (URS)	4
Tsacho Andreykovski (BUL)	1
Winfred Kabunda (ZAM)	1
Rudi Fink (GDR)	4

Semifinals
Viktor Rybakov (URS)	1
Rudi Fink (GDR)	4
