= Puerto Rico at the 1980 Summer Olympics =

- IOC code: PUR
- NOC: Puerto Rico Olympic Committee

in Moscow
- Competitors: 3 (3 men, 0 women) in 1 sport
- Flag bearer: Alberto Mercado
- Medals: Gold 0 Silver 0 Bronze 0 Total 0

Summer Olympics appearances (overview)
- 1948; 1952; 1956; 1960; 1964; 1968; 1972; 1976; 1980; 1984; 1988; 1992; 1996; 2000; 2004; 2008; 2012; 2016; 2020; 2024

Puerto Rico competed at the 1980 Summer Olympics in Moscow, USSR. Notably, in partial support of the American-led boycott of the 1980 Summer Olympics athletes competed under the Olympic Flag.

== History ==
Despite the American boycott being supported by the administration of pro-statehood governor Carlos Romero Barceló, Germán Rieckehoff led the Puerto Rico Olympic Committee (COPUR) in defiance and declared that Puerto Rico would exercise its Olympic sovereignty and participate. The government cut funding and widespread discussion of the concept was held, after which delegation of five members (three of them athletes) was sent. Following internal debate within the COPUR, they paraded under the Olympic flag.

== Results by event ==
=== Boxing ===
Flyweight (– 51 kg)

- Alberto Mercado
  1. First round — bye
  2. Second round — lost to Roman Gilberto (MEX) after referee stopped contest in first round

Featherweight (– 57 kg)

- Luis Pizarro
  1. First round — bye
  2. Second round — defeated Jean Pierre Mberebe Baban (CMR) after referee stopped contest in third round
  3. Third round — defeated Fitzroy Brown (GUY) on points (5-0)
  4. Quarterfinals — lost to Adolfo Horta (CUB) on points (0-5)

Light-Welterweight (– 63.5 kg)

- José Angel Molina
  1. First round — defeated Ebrahim Saide (ETH) on points (5-0)
  2. Second round — defeated Dietmar Schwarz (GDR) after referee stopped contest in third round
  3. Quarterfinals — lost to Serik Konakbaev (URS) retired
