= Venezuela at the 1980 Summer Olympics =

- IOC code: VEN
- NOC: Venezuelan Olympic Committee

in Moscow
- Competitors: 37 in 7 sports
- Flag bearer: Antonio Esparragoza
- Medals Ranked 32nd: Gold 0 Silver 1 Bronze 0 Total 1

Summer Olympics appearances (overview)
- 1948; 1952; 1956; 1960; 1964; 1968; 1972; 1976; 1980; 1984; 1988; 1992; 1996; 2000; 2004; 2008; 2012; 2016; 2020; 2024

Venezuela competed at the 1980 Summer Olympics in Moscow, USSR. 37 competitors, all men, took part in 20 events in 7 sports.

== Medalists ==
=== Silver ===
- Bernardo Piñango — Boxing, Men's Bantamweight (– 54 kg)

== Athletics ==
Men's 800 metres

- William Wuycke

- Heat — 1:48.5
- Semifinals — 1:47.4 (→ did not advance)

== Boxing ==
Men's Light Flyweight (– 48 kg)

- Pedro Manuel Nieves

- First Round — Defeated Singkham Phongprathith (Laos) after referee stopped contest in first round
- Second Round — Lost to Dietmar Geilich (East Germany) on points (0-5)

Men's Flyweight (– 51 kg)

- Ramon Armando Guevara

- First Round — Defeated Nyama Narantuya (Mongolia) on points (5-0)
- Second Round — Lost to Yo Ryon-Sik (North Korea) on points (1-4)

Men's Bantamweight (– 54 kg)

- Bernardo Piñango → Silver Medal

- First Round — Bye
- Second Round — Defeated Ernesto Alguera (Nicaragua) on points (4-1)
- Third Round — Defeated Veli Koota (Finland) after diskwalification in second round
- Quarter Finals — Defeated John Siryakibbe (Uganda) after knock-out in second round
- Semi Finals — Defeated Dumitru Cipere (Romania) on points (3-2)
- Final — Lost to Juan Hernández (Cuba) on points (0-5)

Men's Featherweight (– 57 kg)

- Antonio Esparragoza

- First Round — Bye
- Second Round — Lost to Peter Joseph Hanlon (Great Britain) on points (1-4)

Men's Lightweight (– 60 kg)

- Nelson René Trujillo

- First Round — Lost to Sean Doyle (Ireland) after referee stopped contest in second round

Men's Light-Welterweight (– 63,5 kg)

- Nelson José Rodriguez

- First Round — Lost to John Munduga (Uganda) on points (1-4)

== Cycling ==
Five cyclists represented Venezuela in 1980.

Individual road race

- Jesús Torres
- Mario Medina
- Olinto Silva
- Juan Arroyo

Team time trial

- Claudio Pérez
- Olinto Silva
- Juan Arroyo
- Mario Medina

== Football ==
=== Men's team competition ===
- Preliminary Round (Group A)

- Lost to Soviet Union (0-4)
- Lost to Cuba (1-2)
- Defeated Zambia (2-1)

- Quarter Finals

- Did not advance

- Team Roster

- Eustorgio Sánchez
- Ordan Aguirre
- Emilio Campos
- Pedro Acosta
- Mauro Cichero
- Robert Elie
- Alexis Peña
- Asdrubal José Sanchez
- Iker Joseba Zubizarreta
- Bernardo Añor
- Angel Castillo
- César Armando Semidey
- Rodolfo Carvajal
- Pedro Juan Febles
- Nelson José Carrero
- Juan José Vidal

== Swimming ==
Men's 100m Freestyle

- Alberto Eugenio Mestre

- Heats — 52,62 (→ did not advance)

Men's 200m Freestyle

- Jean Marc Francois Carezis

- Heats — 1.54,76 (→ did not advance)

- Rafael Vidal

- Heats — DNS
