= Boxing at the 1980 Summer Olympics – Bantamweight =

Boxing competitions

Bantamweight boxing at the Games of the XXII Olympiad
- Venue: Olympiysky Sports Complex
- Date: 20 July – 2 August 1980
- Competitors: 33 from 33 nations

Medalists
1st place, gold medalist(s)		Juan Hernández	Cuba
2nd place, silver medalist(s)		Bernardo Piñango	Venezuela
3rd place, bronze medalist(s)		Michael Anthony	Guyana
3rd place, bronze medalist(s)		Dumitru Cipere	Romania

The bantamweight boxing competition at the 1980 Olympic Games in Moscow was held from 20 July to 2 August at the Olympiysky Sports Complex. 33 boxers from 33 nations competed.

== Schedule ==
Date	Time	Round
Sunday, 20 July 1980	18:00	Round of 64
Wednesday, 23 July 1980	12:00; 18:00	Round of 32
Sunday, 27 July 1980	12:00; 18:00	Round of 16
Wednesday, 30 July 1980	13:00	Quarterfinals
Thursday, 31 July 1980	13:00	Semifinals
Saturday, 2 August 1980	15:00	Final

== Results ==
=== Finals ===
Semifinals
Juan Hernández (CUB)	5
Michael Anthony (GUY)	0
Bernardo Piñango (VEN)	3
Dumitru Cipere (ROU)	2

Final
Juan Hernández (CUB)	5
Bernardo Piñango (VEN)	0

=== Round of 64 ===
	Result	
Moussa Sangare (MLI)	0–5	Lucky Mutale (ZAM)
Mario Behrendt (GDR)	0–5	Dumitru Cipere (ROU)

=== Top half ===
Round of 32
Juan Hernández (CUB)	4
Sándor Farkas (HUN)	1
Ayele Mohammed (ETH)	5
Ahmad Nesar (AFG)	0
Geraldi Issaick (TAN)	3
Jorge Monard (ECU)	2
Samba Jacob Diallo (GUI)	1
Ganapathy Manoharan (IND)	4
Ray Gilbody (GBR)	5
João Luis de Almeida (ANG)	0
Philip Sutcliff (IRL)	0
Daniel Zaragoza (MEX)	5
Souneat Ouphaphone (LAO)	0
Fayez Zaghloul (SYR)	5
Nureni Gbadamosi (NGR)	0
Michael Anthony (GUY)	5

Round of 16
Juan Hernández (CUB)	RSC
Ayele Mohammed (ETH)
Geraldi Issaick (TAN)	RSC
Ganapathy Manoharan (IND)
Ray Gilbody (GBR)	1
Daniel Zaragoza (MEX)	4
Fayez Zaghloui (SYR)	2
Michael Anthony (GUY)	3

Quarterfinals
Juan Hernández (CUB)	RSC
Geraldi Issaick (TAN)
Daniel Zaragoza (MEX)
Michael Anthony (GUY)	RSC

Semifinals
Juan Hernández (CUB)	5
Michael Anthony (GUY)	0

=== Bottom half ===
Round of 32
Veli Koota (FIN)	RSC
Fazlija Šaćirović (YUG)
Ernesto Alguera (NCA)	1
Bernardo Piñango (VEN)	4
Ali Ben Maghenia (FRA)	WO
Pushkardhoj Shahi (NEP)
John Siryakibbe (UGA)	RSC
Aleksandar Radev (BUL)
Samson Khachatryan (URS)	5
Andrés Tena (DOM)	0
Joseph Ahanda (CMR)	RSC
Tsedengiin Narmandakh (MGL)
Ryszard Czerwiński (POL)	KO
Firmin Abissi (BEN)
Lucky Mutale (ZAM)	0
Dumitru Cipere (ROU)	5

Round of 16
Veli Koota (FIN)	DSQ
Bernardo Piñango (VEN)
Ali Ben Moghenia (FRA)	0
John Siryakibbe (UGA)	5
Samson Khachatrian (URS)	5
Joseph Ahanda (CMR)	0
Ryszard Czerwiński (POL)	0
Dumitru Cipere (ROU)	5

Quarterfinals
Bernardo Piñango (VEN)	KO
John Siryakibbe (UGA)
Samson Khachatrian (URS)	1
Dumitru Cipere (ROU)	4

Semifinals
Bernardo Piñango (VEN)	3
Dumitru Cipere (ROU)	2
