= Boxing at the 1980 Summer Olympics =

Boxing at the Games of the XXII Olympiad
- Dates: 20 July-2 August 1980
- Competitors: 271 from 51 nations

Boxing at the 1980 Summer Olympics took place at the Indoor Stadium of the Olympiski Sports Complex in Moscow from 20 July to 2 August. Eleven boxing events (all men's individual) were contested with the participation of 271 fighters from 51 countries.

== Medalists ==
Event	Gold	Silver	Bronze
Light flyweight (48kg)	Shamil Sabirov; Soviet Union	Hipólito Ramos; Cuba	Lee Byong-Uk; North Korea Ismail Mustafov; Bulgaria
Flyweight (51kg)	Petar Lesov; Bulgaria	Viktor Miroshnichenko; Soviet Union	Hugh Russell; Ireland János Váradi; Hungary
Bantamweight (54kg)	Juan Bautista Hernández Pérez; Cuba	Bernardo Pinango; Venezuela	Michael Anthony; Guyana Dumitru Cipere; Romania
Featherweight (57kg)	Rudi Fink; East Germany	Adolfo Horta; Cuba	Viktor Rybakov; Soviet Union Krzysztof Kosedowski; Poland
Lightweight (60kg)	Ángel Herrera; Cuba	Viktor Demyanenko; Soviet Union	Kazimierz Adach; Poland Richard Nowakowski; East Germany
Light welterweight (63.5kg)	Patrizio Oliva; Italy	Serik Konakbayev; Soviet Union	Tony Willis; Great Britain José Aguilar; Cuba
Welterweight (67kg)	Andrés Aldama; Cuba	John Mugabi; Uganda	Karl-Heinz Krüger; East Germany Kazimierz Szczerba; Poland
Light middleweight (71kg)	Armando Martínez; Cuba	Aleksandr Koshkyn; Soviet Union	Ján Franek; Czechoslovakia Detlef Kästner; East Germany
Middleweight (75kg)	José Gómez Mustelier; Cuba	Viktor Savchenko; Soviet Union	Valentin Silaghi; Romania Jerzy Rybicki; Poland
Light heavyweight (81kg)	Slobodan Kačar; Yugoslavia	Paweł Skrzecz; Poland	Herbert Bauch; East Germany Ricardo Rojas; Cuba
Heavyweight (+81kg)	Teófilo Stevenson; Cuba	Pyotr Zayev; Soviet Union	István Lévai; Hungary Jürgen Fanghänel; East Germany

== Medal table ==
* Host nation (Soviet Union)

Rank	Nation	Gold	Silver	Bronze	Total
1	Cuba	6	2	2	10
2	Soviet Union*	1	6	1	8
3	East Germany	1	0	5	6
4	Bulgaria	1	0	1	2
5	Italy	1	0	0	1
5	Yugoslavia	1	0	0	1
7	Poland	0	1	4	5
8	Uganda	0	1	0	1
8	Venezuela	0	1	0	1
10	Hungary	0	0	2	2
10	Romania	0	0	2	2
12	Czechoslovakia	0	0	1	1
12	Great Britain	0	0	1	1
12	Guyana	0	0	1	1
12	Ireland	0	0	1	1
12	North Korea	0	0	1	1
Totals (16 entries)		11	11	22	44

== Participation ==
NOC	48 kg	51 kg	54 kg	57 kg	60 kg	63.5 kg	67 kg	71 kg	75 kg	81 kg	+81 kg	Total
Afghanistan			X	X	X							3
Algeria	X					X				~~X~~		2
Angola			X	X	X							3
Australia					X					X		2
Austria									X			1
Benin			X	X	X	X	X	X	X			7
Brazil				X		X		X	X			4
Bulgaria	X	X	X	X	X	X	X	X	X	X	X	11
Cameroon			X	X		X				X		4
Republic of the Congo					X		X			X		3
Cuba	X	X	X	X	X	X	X	X	X	X	X	11
Czechoslovakia				X			X	X				3
Denmark					X		X			X		3
Dominican Republic			X									1
East Germany	X		X	X	X	X	X	X	X	X	X	10
Ecuador	X		X								X	3
Ethiopia	X	X	X	X	X	X	X	X				8
Finland	X		X	X			X		X			5
France			X	X								2
Great Britain		X	X	X	X	X	X	X	X	X		9
Guinea		X	X					X				3
Guyana			X	X		X			X			4
Hungary	X	X	X	X	X	X	X			X	X	9
India	X	X	X									3
Iraq	X	X		X		X	X	X		X		7
Ireland	X	X	X	X	X	X	X					7
Italy					X	X		X			X	4
Laos	X		X	X	X	X	X					6
Lebanon							X	X				2
Madagascar				X	X		X					3
Mali			X									1
Mexico	X	X	X	X								4
Mongolia	X	X	X	X	X	X	X					7
Nepal		X	~~X~~	X		X						3
Nicaragua		X	X									2
Nigeria			X	X	X	X	X	X	X		X	8
North Korea	X	X		X	X	X			X			6
Poland	X	X	X	X	X	X	X	X	X	X	X	11
Portugal	X											1
Puerto Rico		X		X		X						3
Romania	X	X	X	X	X	X	X	X	X	X	X	11
Seychelles				X			X					2
Sierra Leone					X		X					2
Soviet Union	X	X	X	X	X	X	X	X	X	X	X	11
Sweden				X	X	X		X	X		X	6
Syria	X	X	X	X		X	X	X			X	8
Tanzania		X	X	X	X	X	X	X		X	X	9
Uganda	X		X		X	X	X	X	X			7
Venezuela	X	X	X	X	X	X	X	X	X			9
Yugoslavia			X	X	X	X	X	X	X	X	X	9
Zambia		X	X	X	X	X	X	X	X			8
51 NOCs	22	22	33	35	29	30	29	23	19	15	14	271
