= Boxing at the 1980 Summer Olympics – Light welterweight =

Boxing competitions

Light welterweight boxing at the Games of the XXII Olympiad
- Venue: Olympiysky Sports Complex
- Date: 21 July – 2 August 1980
- Competitors: 30 from 30 nations

Medalists
1st place, gold medalist(s)		Patrizio Oliva	Italy
2nd place, silver medalist(s)		Serik Konakbayev	Soviet Union
3rd place, bronze medalist(s)		Tony Willis	Great Britain
3rd place, bronze medalist(s)		José Aguilar	Cuba

The light welterweight boxing competition at the 1980 Olympic Games in Moscow was held from 21 July to 2 August at the Olympiysky Sports Complex. 30 boxers from 30 nations competed.

== Schedule ==
Date	Time	Round
Monday, 21 July 1980	12:00; 18:00	Round of 32
Saturday, 26 July 1980	12:00; 18:00	Round of 16
Tuesday, 29 July 1980	19:00	Quarterfinals
Thursday, 31 July 1980	19:00	Semifinals
Saturday, 2 August 1980	15:00	Final

== Results ==
=== Finals ===
Semifinals
Tony Willis (GBR)	0
Patrizio Oliva (ITA)	5
José Aguilar (CUB)	1
Serik Konakbayev (URS)	4

Final
Patrizio Oliva (ITA)	4
Serik Konakbayev (URS)	1

=== Top half ===
Round of 32
Tony Willis (GBR)	5
Jaime Sodré (BRA)	0
Shadrach Odhiambo (SWE)	4
Bogdan Gajda (POL)	1
Boualem Bel Alouane (ALG)	5
Barrington Cambridge (GUY)	0
Margarit Atanasov (BUL)	1
Ace Rusevski (YUG)	4
Patrizio Oliva (ITA)	RSC
Aurélien Agnan (BEN)
Farez Halabi (SYR)	3
M. Kampanath (LAO)	2

Round of 16
Khastyn Jamgan (MGL)	0
William Lyimo (TAN)	5
Tony Willis (GBR)	5
Shadrach Odhiambo (SWE)	0
Boualem Bel Alouane (ALG)	0
Ace Rusevski (YUG)	5
Patrizio Oliva (ITA)	RSC
Farez Halabi (SYR)

Quarterfinals
William Lyimo (TAN)
Tony Willis (GBR)	KO
Ace Rusevski (YUG)	2
Patrizio Oliva (ITA)	3

Semifinals
Tony Willis (GBR)	0
Patrizio Oliva (ITA)	5

=== Bottom half ===
Round of 32
John Munduga (UGA)	4
Nelson Rodríguez (VEN)	1
Farouk Chanchoun (IRQ)	5
Ayodele Peters (NGR)	0
José Aguilar (CUB)	RSC
Martin Brerton (IRL)
Bishnu Malakar (NEP)
Ryu Bun-hwa (PRK)	RSC
Dietmar Schwarz (GDR)	5
Teddy Makofi (ZAM)	0
José Angel Molina (PUR)	5
Ebrahim Saide (ETH)	0
Imre Bácskai (HUN)	4
Paul Kamela (CMR)	1
Serik Konakbayev (URS)	5
Simion Cuțov (ROU)	0

Round of 16
John Mundunga (UGA)
Farouk Jawad (IRQ)	KO
José Aguilar (CUB)	4
Ryu Bun-hwa (PRK)	1
Dietmar Schwarz (GDR)
José Angel Molina (PUR)	RSC
Imre Bacskai (HUN)	RET
Serik Konakbayev (URS)

Quarterfinals
Farouk Jawad (IRQ)
José Aguilar (CUB)	RSC
José Angel Molina (PUR)
Serik Konakbayev (URS)	WO

Semifinals
José Aguilar (CUB)	1
Serik Konakbayev (URS)	4
