= Cameroon at the 1972 Summer Olympics =

- IOC code: CMR
- NOC: Cameroon Olympic and Sports Committee

in Munich
- Competitors: 11 in 3 sports
- Flag bearer: Gaston Malam
- Medals: Gold 0 Silver 0 Bronze 0 Total 0

Summer Olympics appearances (overview)
- 1964; 1968; 1972; 1976; 1980; 1984; 1988; 1992; 1996; 2000; 2004; 2008; 2012; 2016; 2020; 2024

Cameroon competed at the 1972 Summer Olympics in Munich, West Germany. Eleven competitors, all men, took part in twelve events in three sports.

== Athletics ==
Men's 100 metres

- Gaston Malam
  - First Heat – 10.88s (→ did not advance)

Men's 1500 metres

- Esaie Fongang
  - Heat – 3:54.5 (→ did not advance)

Men's 5000 metres

- Nji Esau Ade
  - Heat – 15:19.6 (→ did not advance)

Men's High Jump

- Hamadou Evele
  - Qualification Round – 1.90m (→ did not advance)

== Boxing ==
Men's Featherweight

- Emmanuel Eloundou

Men's Heavyweight (+ 81 kg)

- Jean Bassomben
  - First Round – Lost to Hasse Thomsén (Sweden), 1:4

== Cycling ==
Four cyclists represented Cameroon in 1972.

Individual road race

- Joseph Evouna – did not finish (→ no ranking)
- Joseph Kono – did not finish (→ no ranking)
- Nicolas Owona – did not finish (→ no ranking)
- Jean Bernard Djambou – did not finish (→ no ranking)

Team time trial

The team ranked 33rd and was made up of the following members:

- Jean Bernard Djambou
- Joseph Evouna
- Joseph Kono
- Nicolas Owona
