= Mexico at the 1980 Summer Olympics =

- IOC code: MEX
- NOC: Mexican Olympic Committee

in Moscow
- Competitors: 45 (36 men and 9 women) in 12 sports
- Flag bearer: Carlos Girón
- Medals Ranked 29th: Gold 0 Silver 1 Bronze 3 Total 4

Summer Olympics appearances (overview)
- 1900; 1904–1920; 1924; 1928; 1932; 1936; 1948; 1952; 1956; 1960; 1964; 1968; 1972; 1976; 1980; 1984; 1988; 1992; 1996; 2000; 2004; 2008; 2012; 2016; 2020; 2024

Mexico competed at the 1980 Summer Olympics in Moscow, USSR. 45 competitors, 36 men and 9 women, took part in 43 events in 12 sports.

== Medalists ==
=== Silver ===
- Carlos Girón — Diving, Men's Springboard

=== Bronze ===
- Joaquin Pérez — Equestrian, Jumping Individual (mixed)
- David Bárcena Ríos, Manuel Mendivil, José Pérez and Fabián Vázquez — Equestrian, Three-day Event Team Competition
- Jesús Gómez, Joaquin Pérez, Gerardo Tazzer and Alberto Valdés — Equestrian, Jumping Team Competition

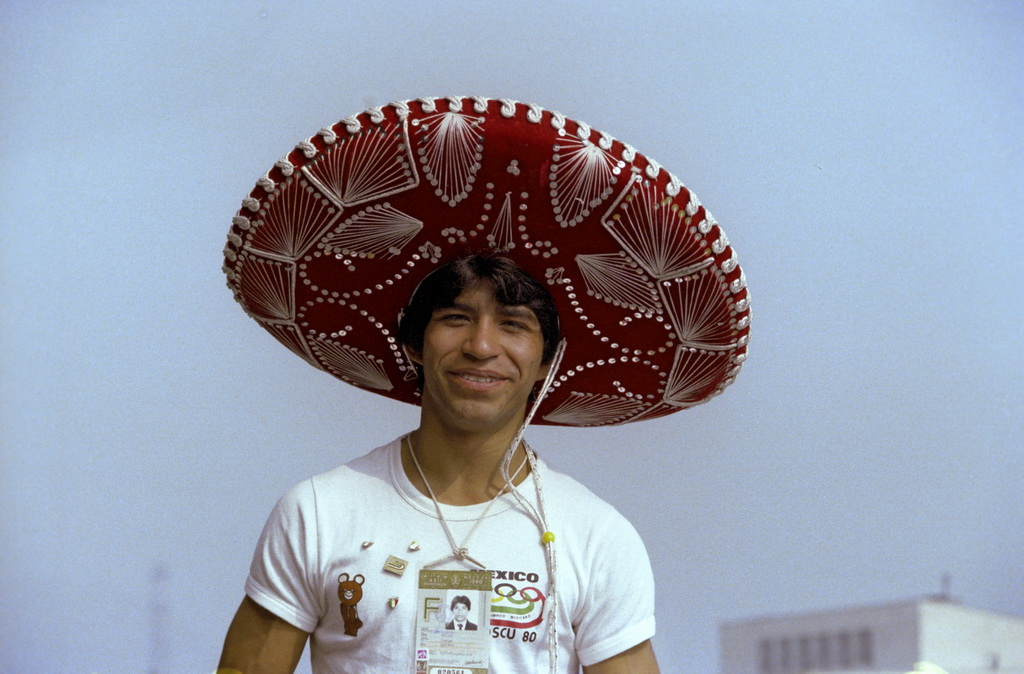
Mexican sportsman at 1980 Olympics

== Athletics ==
Men's 10,000 metres

- Enrique Aquino

- Heat — 29:21.3 (→ did not advance)

- Rodolfo Gómez

- Heat — 29:25.7 (→ did not advance)

- José Gómez

- Heat — 29:53.6 (→ did not advance)

Men's Marathon

- Rodolfo Gómez

- Final — 2:12:39 (→ 6th place)

Men's 20 km Walk

- Raúl González

- Final — 1:27:48.6 (→ 6th place)

- Daniel Bautista

- Final — DSQ (→ no ranking)

- Domingo Colín

- Final — DSQ (→ no ranking)

Men's 50 km Walk

- Raúl González

- Final — did not finish (→ no ranking)

- Daniel Bautista

- Final — did not finish (→ no ranking)

- Martín Bermúdez

- Final — did not finish (→ no ranking)

== Boxing ==
Men's Light Flyweight (– 48 kg)

- Gilberto Sosa

- First Round — Defeated Vandui Bayasgalan (Mongolia) on points (4-1)
- Second Round — Lost to Li Byong-Uk (North Korea) on points (2-3)

Men's Flyweight (– 51 kg)

- Roman Gilberto

- First Round — Bye
- Second Round — Defeated Alberto Mercado (Puerto Rico) after referee stopped contest in first round
- Quarter Finals — Lost to Petar Lesov (Bulgaria) on points (1-4)

Men's Bantamweight (– 54 kg)

- Daniel Zaragoza

- First Round — Bye
- Second Round — Defeated Philip Sutcliffe Snr (Ireland) on points (5-0)
- Third Round — Defeated Raymond Gilbody (Great Britain) on points (4-1)
- Quarter Finals — Lost to Michael Anthony (Guyana) after referee stopped contest in second round

Men's Featherweight (– 57 kg)

- Carlos González

- First Round — Defeated Nidal Haddad (Syria) on points (5-0)
- Second Round — Defeated Ravsal Otgonbayar (Mongolia) on points (3-2)
- Third Round — Lost to Rudi Fink (East Germany) after knock-out in first round

== Diving ==
Men's Springboard

- Carlos Girón

- Heats — 580.20 points (→ 1st place)
- Final — 892.140 points (→ Silver Medal)

- Francisco Rueda

- Preliminary Round — 495.63 points (→ 14th place, did not advance)

- Jorge Mondragón

- Heats — 454.17 points (→ 20th place, did not advance)

Men's Platform

- Carlos Girón

- Heats — 515.37 points (→ 5th place)
- Final — 809.805 points (→ 4th place)

- Francisco Rueda

- Preliminary Round — 428.52 points (→ 15th place, did not advance)

- Salvador Sobrino

- Preliminary Round — 456.87 points (→ 11th place, did not advance)

== Modern pentathlon ==
Two male pentathletes represented Mexico in 1980.

Individual

- Ivar Sisniega
- Jens Lohmann

== Swimming ==
Women's 100 m Breaststroke

- Elke Holtz

- Heats — 1:15.89 (→ did not advance)

Women's 4 × 100 m Freestyle Relay

- Isabel Reuss, Dagmar Erdman, Teresa Rivera, and Helen Plachinski

- Heats — 3.56,87
- Final — 3.55,41 (→ 6th place)

Women's 4 × 100 m Medley Relay

- Teresa Rivera, Elke Holtz, Dagmar Erdman, and Helen Plachinski

- Heats — 4.25,95 (→ did not advance)

== Wrestling ==
Men's freestyle 48 kg

- Jorge Frías

- Eliminated in Third Round

Men's Greco-Roman 48 kg

- Alfredo Olvera

- Sixth place
