= Cameroon at the 1980 Summer Olympics =

- IOC code: CMR
- NOC: Cameroon Olympic and Sports Committee

in Moscow
- Competitors: 25 (22 men, 3 women) in 5 sports
- Medals: Gold 0 Silver 0 Bronze 0 Total 0

Summer Olympics appearances (overview)
- 1964; 1968; 1972; 1976; 1980; 1984; 1988; 1992; 1996; 2000; 2004; 2008; 2012; 2016; 2020; 2024

Cameroon competed at the 1980 Summer Olympics in Moscow, USSR. The nation returned to the Olympic Games after boycotting the 1976 Summer Olympics. 25 competitors, 22 men and 3 women, took part in 23 events in 5 sports.

== Athletics ==
Men's 100 metres

- Grégoire Illorson
  - Heat — 10.34
  - Quarterfinals — 10.29
  - Semifinals — 10.60 (→ did not advance)

Men's 200 metres

- Grégoire Illorson
  - Heat — 22.21 (→ did not advance)
- Emmanuel Bitanga
  - Heat — did not start (→ did not advance)

Women's 100 metres

- Ruth Enang Mesode
  - Heat — 12.40 (→ did not advance)

Women's Javelin Throw

- Agnes Tchuinte
  - Qualification — 55.36 m (→ did not advance)

Women's Pentathlon

- Cécile Ngambi — 3832 points (→ 17th place)
  1. 100 metres — 14.09s
  2. Shot Put — 10.28m
  3. High Jump — 1.80m
  4. Long Jump — 5.38m
  5. 800 metres — 2:39.70

== Boxing ==
Men's Bantamweight (– 54 kg)

- Joseph Ahanda
  - First Round — Bye
  - Second Round — Defeated Tseden Narmandakh (Mongolia) after referee stopped contest in third round
  - Third Round — Lost to Samson Khachatrian (Soviet Union) on points (0-5)

Men's Featherweight (– 57 kg)

- Jean Pierre Mberebe Baban (Note: See Cameroon at the 1984 Summer Olympics#Boxing for his second participation at the Olympics.)
  - First Round — Bye
  - Second Round — Lost to Luis Pizarro (Puerto Rico) after referee stopped contest in third round

Men's Light-Welterweight (– 63,5 kg)

- Paul Kamela Fogang
  - First Round — Lost to Imre Bacskai (Hungary) on points (1-4)

== Cycling ==
Six cyclists represented Cameroon in 1980.

Individual road race

- Joseph Evouna
- Joseph Kono
- Thomas Nyemeg
- Nicolas Owona

Team time trial

- Charles Bana
- Toussaint Fouda
- Joseph Kono
- Nicolas Owona
