= Moussa Sangare =

Malian boxer (born 1958)

Personal information
- Nationality: Malian
- Born: 11 January 1958 (age 67); Bamako, Mali

Sport
- Sport: Boxing

Moussa Sangare (born 11 January 1958) is a Malian boxer. He competed in the men's bantamweight event at the 1980 Summer Olympics. At the 1980 Summer Olympics, he lost to Lucky Mutale of Zambia.
