= Barry McGuigan =

Irish boxer (born 1961)

Barry McGuigan MBE
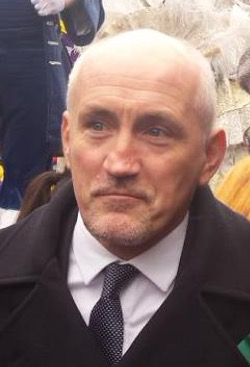
- McGuigan in 2015

Personal information
- Nickname: The Clones Cyclone
- Born: Finbar Patrick McGuigan; 28 February 1961 (age 65) Clones, County Monaghan, Republic of Ireland
- Height: 5 ft 6 in (1.68 m)
- Weight: Featherweight

Boxing career
- Reach: 70 in (178 cm)
- Stance: Orthodox

Boxing record
- Total fights: 35
- Wins: 32
- Win by KO: 28
- Losses: 3
Medal record
Men's amateur boxing
Representing Northern Ireland
Commonwealth Games
Gold medal – first place	1978 Edmonton	Bantamweight

Finbar Patrick "Barry" McGuigan (born 28 February 1961) is an Irish boxing promoter and former professional boxer. Born in Clones, County Monaghan, McGuigan represented both Northern Ireland and the Republic of Ireland as an amateur. Nicknamed The Clones Cyclone, he held the WBA and lineal featherweight titles from 1985 to 1986. At regional level, he also held the British and European featherweight titles between 1983 and 1985. In 1985, McGuigan became BBC Sports Personality of the Year. In 2005, he was inducted into the International Boxing Hall of Fame.

== Background ==
Barry McGuigan was born in Clones, County Monaghan, Ireland. His father was singer Pat McGuigan (died 1987). Pat McGuigan sang "Danny Boy" before several of his son's matches. This inspired the Hacienda Brothers' song "If Daddy Don't Sing Danny Boy", written by boxer and musician Chris Gaffney.

As an amateur, McGuigan represented Northern Ireland in the Commonwealth Games at Edmonton in 1978 and represented Ireland at the 1980 Summer Olympics in Moscow. He became a UK citizen so that he could compete for British titles.

During his professional career, McGuigan fought at a number of venues in Ireland and Britain. He attracted an enormous following in the mid-1980s, particularly to the King's Hall in Belfast which he regularly filled to capacity. McGuigan is a Roman Catholic, and at a time when Catholics and Protestants were clashing during The Troubles, he married a Protestant, Sandra Mealiff. As of 2025, they remain married for over four decades.

McGuigan stated that the support he received from both Protestants and Catholics in Ireland was because:

"[the] shadows ran deep. And my fights felt a little like sunshine. Both sides would say: 'Leave the fighting to McGuigan.' You see, it was also entertainment – people loved to forget the Troubles a while. The fact that I wouldn't wear green, white and gold or put on a sign that said this is who I represent was powerful. It was a very mature and dangerous thing to do. I wouldn't choose sides. People appreciated that."

He and his wife have both been patrons for children's cancer charity CLIC Sargent.

== Amateur career ==
McGuigan began his juvenile boxing career at the Wattlebridge Amateur Boxing Club, County Fermanagh, and later moved to the Smithborough Amateur Boxing Club, County Monaghan. He won the All Ireland Amateur Championship in 1976 having defeated Martin Brereton. Notable opponents during his teenage years included Dubliner James Coughlan, whom he defeated at the age of 15, and Gordon McNeil (of Heaton, Newcastle upon Tyne).

McGuigan represented Northern Ireland in the Commonwealth Games at Edmonton 1978 and represented Ireland at the 1980 Summer Olympics in Moscow.

=== 1980 Olympic results ===
Barry McGuigan competed at the 1980 Moscow Olympics as a featherweight; his record was:

- Round of 32: defeated Issack Mabushi (Tanzania) referee stopped contest in third round
- Round of 16: lost to Winfred Kabunda (Zambia) by decision, 1–4

== Professional career ==
McGuigan began his professional boxing career on 10 May 1981, beating Selvin Bell by technical knockout (TKO) in two rounds in Dublin. After another win, he suffered his first setback, losing a hotly disputed decision to Peter Eubank (brother of Chris Eubank) over eight rounds at Corn Exchange at the Brighton Dome. After his first loss, McGuigan notched up two more wins, including one over Terry Pizzarro, and then he was given a rematch with Eubank. The second time around, McGuigan prevailed, by a knockout in the eighth round.

In 1982, McGuigan won eight fights, seven by knockout, but one of these almost destroyed his career and his life. Fighting Young Ali, on 14 June 1982, McGuigan won by a knockout in six rounds; Ali fell into a coma and died two days later. According to the book The Ring: Boxing The 20th Century. Ali's death affected McGuigan so much that he was not sure he wanted to carry on as a boxer. He also defeated Paul Huggins and Angelo Licata during this period. In 1983, he won four fights, earning the British Title against Vernon Penprase. This period marked his first trip to fight outside Europe (when he beat Lavon McGowan by a knockout in the first round in Chicago), before he got his first try at a European title.

On 16 November, Italy's Valerio Nati boxed McGuigan for the vacant European Featherweight title in Belfast. McGuigan won the crown with a knockout in the sixth round. He then became the number one featherweight challenger for the WBA. In 1984, he won six bouts, all by knockout. Among the fighters he beat were former world title challengers Jose Caba and Felipe Orozco. McGuigan also overcame contenders Paul DeVorce and Charm Chiteule, retained his British and European titles against Clyde Ruan and held on to the latter belt against Esteban Eguia to keep alive his chances of a world title fight.

In 1985, McGuigan met former world featherweight champion Juan Laporte and won by a decision after ten rounds. Following one more win (a defence of his European title against Farid Gallouze), McGuigan finally earned a tilt at a world title. Long-reigning WBA featherweight champion, Eusebio Pedroza of Panama, put his title on the line at Loftus Road football stadium in London. The Irishman became champion by dropping Pedroza in round seven and winning a unanimous fifteen-round decision in a fight refereed by hall of fame referee Stanley Christodoulou. McGuigan and his wife were feted in a public reception through the streets of Belfast that attracted hundreds of thousands of well-wishers. Later that year, he was named BBC Sports Personality of the Year, becoming the first person not born in the United Kingdom to win the award.

McGuigan made his first defences against American Bernard Taylor, who was stopped in the ninth round, and Danilo Cabrera, who was knocked out in fourteen rounds. This proved to be a controversial stoppage: the fight was ended when the challenger bent over to pick up his mouthpiece after losing it, a practice that is allowed in many countries but not in Ireland. Cabrera was not aware of this rule and the fight was stopped. Although Cabrera's corner protested the outcome, McGuigan remained the winner by a knockout. For his next defence, he went to Las Vegas in June 1986, where he faced relatively unknown Steve Cruz from Texas as a late replacement for Ramon Fernando Sosa who pulled out for having two detached retinas. It proved to be a gruelling fifteen-round title bout under a blazing late-afternoon sun and 110-degree heat in the ring. McGuigan held the lead halfway through, but suffered dehydration because of the extreme heat and wilted near the end, being knocked down in rounds ten and fifteen. He eventually lost a close decision and his world belt, which he was never to reclaim. After the fight, McGuigan required hospitalisation because of his dehydrated state.

After that fight McGuigan retired partly due to the death of his father in 1987. WIth his relationship with previous manager Barney Eastwood at an end, McGuigan returned to the ring between 1988 and 1989, under the management of Frank Warren. He beat former world title challengers Nicky Perez and Francisco Tomas da Cruz, and contender Julio César Miranda, before facing former EBU featherweight champ and future WBC and WBA super featherweight challenger Jim McDonnell. McGuigan lost by TKO when a gash over his right eye, caused by a McDonnell left hook in the second round, forced the referee to stop the fight in the fourth. McGuigan then retired permanently from boxing. His record was 32 wins and 3 losses, with 28 victories by knockout.

McGuigan is the founder and president of the Professional Boxing Association (PBA). He is also the founder and CEO of Cyclone Promotions.

== Professional boxing record ==
35 fights	32 wins	3 losses
By knockout	28	1
By decision	4	2

No.	Result	Record	Opponent	Type	Round, time	Date	Location	Notes
35	Loss	32–3	Jim McDonnell	TKO	4 (10), 1:43	31 May 1989	G-Mex Leisure Centre, Manchester, England	
34	Win	32–2	Julio César Miranda	TKO	8 (10), 1:12	1 Dec 1988	Pickett's Lock Stadium, London, England	
33	Win	31–2	Francisco Tomas da Cruz	TKO	4 (10), 1:43	25 Jun 1988	Kenilworth Road, Luton, England	
32	Win	30–2	Nicky Perez	TKO	4 (10), 2:55	4 Apr 1988	Alexandra Pavilion, London, England	
31	Loss	29–2	Steve Cruz	UD	15	23 Jun 1986	Caesars Palace, Paradise, Nevada, US	Lost WBA and The Ring featherweight titles
30	Win	29–1	Danilo Cabrera	TKO	14 (15), 1:40	15 Feb 1986	The Royal Dublin Society, Dublin, Ireland	Retained WBA and The Ring featherweight titles
29	Win	28–1	Bernard Taylor	RTD	8 (15), 3:00	28 Sep 1985	King's Hall, Belfast, Northern Ireland	Retained WBA and The Ring featherweight titles
28	Win	27–1	Eusebio Pedroza	UD	15	8 Jun 1985	Loftus Road Stadium, London, England	Won WBA and The Ring featherweight titles
27	Win	26–1	Farid Gallouze	TKO	2 (12), 1:20	26 Mar 1985	Wembley Arena, London, England	Retained European featherweight title
26	Win	25–1	Juan Laporte	PTS	10	23 Feb 1985	King's Hall, Belfast, Northern Ireland	
25	Win	24–1	Clyde Ruan	KO	4 (12), 2:50	19 Dec 1984	Ulster Hall, Belfast, Northern Ireland	Retained British and European featherweight titles
24	Win	23–1	Felipe Orozco	KO	2 (10), 2:10	13 Oct 1984	King's Hall, Belfast, Northern Ireland	
23	Win	22–1	Paul DeVorce	TKO	5 (10), 1:30	30 Jun 1984	King's Hall, Belfast, Northern Ireland	
22	Win	21–1	Esteban Eguia	KO	3 (12), 0:45	5 Jun 1984	Royal Albert Hall, London, England	Retained European featherweight title
21	Win	20–1	Jose Caba	TKO	7 (10)	4 Apr 1984	King's Hall, Belfast, Northern Ireland	
20	Win	19–1	Charm Chiteule	TKO	10 (10)	25 Jan 1984	King's Hall, Belfast, Northern Ireland	
19	Win	18–1	Valerio Nati	KO	6 (12), 2:33	16 Nov 1983	King's Hall, Belfast, Northern Ireland	Won vacant European featherweight title
18	Win	17–1	Ruben Dario Herasme	KO	2 (10), 2:58	5 Oct 1983	Ulster Hall, Belfast, Northern Ireland	
17	Win	16–1	Lavon McGowan	KO	1 (10), 2:59	9 Jul 1983	DiVinci Manoe, Chicago, Illinois, US	
16	Win	15–1	Samuel Meck	TKO	6 (10), 2:58	22 May 1983	Navan Exhibition Centre, Navan, Ireland	
15	Win	14–1	Vernon Penprase	TKO	2 (12), 2:50	12 Apr 1983	Ulster Hall, Belfast, Northern Ireland	Won vacant British featherweight title
14	Win	13–1	Paul Huggins	TKO	5 (12)	9 Nov 1982	Ulster Hall, Belfast, Northern Ireland	
13	Win	12–1	Jimmy Duncan	RTD	4 (10)	5 Oct 1982	Ulster Hall, Belfast, Northern Ireland	
12	Win	11–1	Young Ali	KO	6 (8), 2:47	14 June 1982	World Sporting Club, London, England	Ali dies of injuries sustained in the fight
11	Win	10–1	Gary Lucas	KO	1 (8)	22 Apr 1982	Lakeland Forum, Enniskillen, Northern Ireland	
10	Win	9–1	Angelo Licata	TKO	2 (8), 2:45	23 Mar 1982	Ulster Hall, Belfast, Northern Ireland	
9	Win	8–1	Angel Oliver	TKO	3 (8), 2:16	23 Feb 1982	Ulster Hall, Belfast, Northern Ireland	
8	Win	7–1	Ian Murray	TKO	3 (8)	8 Feb 1982	World Sporting Club, London, England	
7	Win	6–1	Luis de la Sagra	PTS	8	27 Jan 1982	Ulster Hall, Belfast, Northern Ireland	
6	Win	5–1	Peter Eubank	TKO	8 (8), 2:40	8 Dec 1981	Ulster Hall, Belfast, Northern Ireland	
5	Win	4–1	Terry Pizzaro	TKO	4 (8)	26 Oct 1981	Ulster Hall, Belfast, Northern Ireland	
4	Win	3–1	Jean-Marc Renard	PTS	8	3 Aug 1981	Ulster Hall, Belfast, Northern Ireland	
3	Loss	2–1	Peter Eubank	PTS	8	3 Aug 1981	Corn Exchange, Brighton, England	
2	Win	2–0	Gary Lucas	TKO	4 (6), 1:20	20 Jun 1981	Empire Pool, London, England	
1	Win	1–0	Selvin Bell	TKO	2 (6)	10 May 1981	Dalymount Park, Dublin, Ireland	

== After boxing ==
=== Motor racing ===
In 1987, McGuigan tried his luck as a racing driver in the MG Metro Turbo Challenge. In October that year, he took part in a Ford Escort Celebrity race at Brands Hatch and finished 5th, sharing with Paul Warwick.

In 1989, McGuigan entered the Standard Production Car Class in British Rallycross, driving a Saab.

In 1990 and 1991, he continued in Rallycross, competing in the Vauxhall Nova Challenge.

In 1992 and 1993, he contested several Rally events, mostly in a Vauxhall Nova, but he did make a single appearance in a 4 wheel drive Ford Sierra RS Cosworth.

=== Other ===
McGuigan attempted to establish an association to protect the rights of boxers against what he, and others, considered omnipotent managers and promoters. In this regard, McGuigan maintains he had had a difficult time during his own career. A previously very close relationship with his manager, Barney Eastwood, deteriorated badly over time and led to a successful libel case against him by Eastwood several years later. He participated in The Grand Knockout Tournament 1987 charity event television special.

McGuigan lives near Whitstable, Kent, with his wife. McGuigan's daughter, Nika, died in 2019 aged 33.

He currently works as a boxing pundit for Sky TV. Two biographies of McGuigan have been written. He is currently a boxing manager and promoter through Cyclone Promotions.

McGuigan is the Chairman of the Professional Boxing Association, an organisation he wanted to set up for over a decade, with the intention of teaching boxers the importance of education.

McGuigan appeared in the film Malicious Intent in 2000. He appeared in the third series of ITV's Hell's Kitchen in September 2007, where he was eventually crowned the winner after winning the public vote. In August 2009, he co-presented Charity Lords of the Ring with Lucy Kennedy.

On 3 January 2024, Cyclone Promotions Ltd and McGuigan's Gym Ltd, of which McGuigan was a director, passed into liquidation.

McGuigan is credited as appearing in the film One Night in Millstreet.

In November 2024, McGuigan appeared as a contestant on the twenty-fourth series of I'm a Celebrity...Get Me Out of Here! and was the fifth contestant to be eliminated, finishing in eighth place.

In 2025, McGuigan endorsed Heather Humphreys' campaign in that year's Irish presidential election.

== Carl Frampton litigation ==
McGuigan's relationship with world champion, Carl Frampton, whom he managed and promoted, ended in August 2017 in the wake of Frampton's scheduled bout against Andrés Gutiérrez being cancelled. In November 2017, Cyclone Promotions lodged papers at the High Court of Justice in London against Frampton for alleged breach of contract.In February 2018, Frampton counter sued Cyclone Promotions and Barry McGuigan in relation to earnings from previous fights, alleging issues such as breach of fiduciary duties, breach of trust, misrepresentation and negligence. Frampton told a court hearing he became suspicious of the McGuigan's in 2016 after discovering they had been using a business account for general expenses, and that money from ticket sales from his fights had been deposited into Barry McGuigan's own personal bank account.

In September 2020, Frampton's lawyers asserted to the Belfast High Court that Cyclone Promotions had withheld earnings from purse fees, broadcasting rights, ticket sales and merchandising income from their client. Frampton was nominated a director of a Northern Ireland based company in 2013, and he was promised a 30 per cent share of the profits by McGuigan. However, in the summer of 2017 authorities contacted Frampton to demand £397,000 in unpaid VAT from the company, and an examination of financial records showed members of the McGuigan family had attempted to claim thousands of pounds worth of living expenses (such as supermarket and petrol station bills) from the company also. Under cross examination from McGuigan's lawyers, Frampton denied he was being greedy by seeking £6 million in damages, and told the court that the figures in his statement of claim were the result of an investigation by forensic accountants. Frampton also revealed that McGuigan and his son Blain had launched claims of almost £4 million against him for leaving Cyclone Promotions.

McGuigan told the court that he one regarded Frampton as like a member of his own family, highlighting how he paid for his expenses early in his career and invited him to stay at his house in England, and asserted that Frampton's success in boxing was at the forefront of his efforts on a daily basis while he was under his management. McGuigan also denied exploiting his relationship for his own benefit, adding that he was in no position to promise any percentage of profits. McGuigan went onto claim his main objectives were to make Frampton a world champion and earn millions of dollars in prize money, going onto achieving both as his manager. McGuigan told the court their relationship began to deteriorate in the run up to the Gutierrez fight when Frampton failed to make the weight, which McGuigan attributed to ill-discipline on Frampton's part. Frampton's barrister revealed that McGuigan had been disqualified as a company director in 1996, with one of the reasons cited as McGuigan paying his personal bills out of the official company bank account. When pressed as to why a number of companies McGuigan was involved with made losses during his time managing Frampton, the reply was he "didn't do the finances" but rather concentrated on the boxing aspect of business. It was also revealed that celebrities such as Rory McIlroy had been charged for VIP tickets to Frampton's fights without his knowledge, which McGuigan suggested were purchases for friends and family rather than the VIPs themselves. Blain McGuigan, who had worked for Cyclone Promotions as a promoter, denied that any portion of Frampton's earnings were hidden from him, telling the court that he was kept well involved of all financial decisions. Blain McGuigan also denied in early 2017 purposely deleting Cyclone Promotions emails in order to destroy information about Frampton's fights that could be useful to his lawyers, asserting that the company was migrating from Gmail to a Microsoft Outlook account and he was simply freeing up space from redundant email threads.

However, the court was informed on 9 November 2020 that over 10,000 emails had been recovered from Cyclone Promotions email servers the previous week, and the trial was adjourned to allow Frampton's legal team to analyze their contents. The matter was finally resolved out of court via confidential settlement on 12 November 2020. Frampton was quoted afterwards as being "extremely happy" with the terms of the settlement. McGuigan later released a statement saying he was satisfied with the settlement, adding it was reached without a judgment of any kind on the merits of either side's case.

== Other recognition ==
McGuigan was inducted into the World Boxing Hall of Fame in 2000 and International Boxing Hall of Fame in 2005. He also fought in Ring Magazine's 1986 Fight of the Year, and was a title character in the 8-bit computer game, Barry McGuigan World Championship Boxing. McGuigan was honoured in an Irish ballad song released in 1984, "Clones Cyclone", written by Johnny McCauley and sung by Big Tom. The German musician and composer Udo Lindenberg also dedicated his song "Jonny Boxer" to McGuigan in 1986. The Bournemouth-based band The Worry Dolls named a track "Barry McGuigan" on their album, The Man That Time Forgot.

McGuigan was the subject of a comedy record by Dermot Morgan, 'Thank You Very Much Mr Eastwood', in which Morgan impersonated him and his habit of thanking his manager and family in post-fight interviews. The record reached number one in the Irish singles charts in December 1985.

He was appointed a Member of the Order of the British Empire (MBE) in 1994. McGuigan is a dual citizen of both Ireland and the United Kingdom.

== See also ==
- List of featherweight boxing champions

Sporting positions
Regional boxing titles
Vacant Title last held by Loris Stecca	European featherweight champion 16 November 1983 – 8 June 1985	Vacant Title next held by Jim McDonnell
World boxing titles
Preceded by Eusebio Pedroza	WBA Featherweight Champion; 8 June 1985 – 23 June 1986	Succeeded by Steve Cruz
Preceded by Eusebio Pedroza	The Ring featherweight champion 8 June 1985 – 23 June 1986	Succeeded by Steve Cruz
Awards
Preceded by Torvill and Dean	BBC Sports Personality of the Year; 1985	Succeeded by Nigel Mansell
Previous: Marvin Hagler vs. Thomas Hearns	The Ring Fight of the Year vs. Steve Cruz; 1986	Next: Marvin Hagler vs. Sugar Ray Leonard
Previous: Marvin Hagler vs. Thomas Hearns; Round 1	The Ring Round of the Year vs. Steve Cruz; Round 15; 1986	Next: Kelvin Seabrooks vs.Thierry Jacob; Round 1
