= Mario Behrendt =

East German boxer (1960–2022)

Personal information
- Nationality: German
- Born: 9 September 1960 East Berlin, East Germany
- Died: 2022 (aged 61–62)

Sport
- Sport: Boxing

Mario Behrendt (9 September 1960 – 2022) was an East German boxer. A son of 1956 Olympic champion Wolfgang Behrendt, he competed in the men's bantamweight event at the 1980 Summer Olympics where he lost to Dumitru Cipere of Romania in the first round. He died of a serious disease in 2022.
