= Aleksandar Radev =

Bulgarian boxer

Personal information
- Nationality: Bulgarian
- Born: 24 June 1960 (age 66)

Sport
- Sport: Boxing

Aleksandar Radev (born 24 June 1960) is a Bulgarian boxer. He competed in the men's bantamweight event at the 1980 Summer Olympics. He lost in his opening fight to John Siryakibbe of Uganda, after the referee stopped the contest.
