= Krzysztof Kosedowski =

Polish boxer (born 1960)

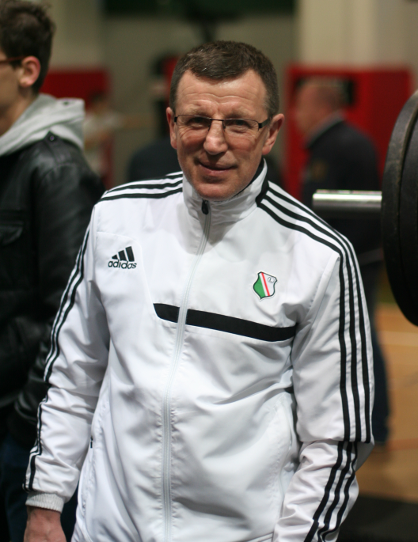
- Krzysztof Kosedowski, 6 May 2015

Personal information
- Nationality: Polish
- Born: Krzysztof Kazimierz Kosedowski; 12 December 1960 Tczew, Poland
- Weight: featherweight

Boxing career
- Stance: Orthodox
Medal record
Men's boxing
Representing Poland
Men's Boxing
Bronze medal – third place	1980 Moscow	Featherweight
European Amateur Championships
Silver medal – second place	1981 Tampere	Featherweight

Krzysztof Kazimierz Kosedowski (born December 12, 1960) is a retired boxer from Poland, who won the bronze medal in the featherweight division (– 57 kg) at the 1980 Summer Olympics in Moscow, Soviet Union. In the semifinals, he was beaten by eventual silver medalist Adolfo Horta of Cuba after a walkover.

Kosedowski's brothers, Dariusz Kosedowski and Leszek Kosedowski, also boxed for Poland in the Olympic Games.

Kosedowski played in movie: Chłopaki nie płaczą.

== 1980 Olympic results ==
- Round of 64: bye
- Round of 32: Defeated Gu Yong-ju (North Korea) by decision, 5-0
- Round of 16: Defeated Dejan Marovic (Yugoslavia) by decision, 4-1
- Quarterfinal: Defeated Sydney dal Rovere (Brazil) by decision, 5-0
- Semifinal: Lost to Adolfo Horta (Cuba) by walkover (was awarded bronze medal)
