= Barrington Cambridge =

Guyanese boxer

Barrington "Barry" Cambridge (born July 15, 1957) is a retired Guyanese light-welterweight boxer, who represented his country at the 1980 Summer Olympics. There he was eliminated in the first round of the men's light-welterweight division by Boualem Bel Alouane of Algeria by a 5-0 decision.
