= Odd Bengtsson =

Swedish boxer

Personal information
- Nationality: Swedish
- Born: 19 February 1959 (age 66); Stockholm, Sweden

Sport
- Sport: Boxing

Odd Bengtsson (born 19 February 1959) is a Swedish boxer. He competed in the men's featherweight event at the 1980 Summer Olympics. At the 1980 Summer Olympics, he lost to Adolfo Horta of Cuba.
