= Paul Tweed =

Northern Irish lawyer

- Born: 1955 (age 70–71); Bangor, County Down, Northern Ireland
- Occupations: International Media Lawyer, Litigator and Mediator

Paul Tweed (born 1955) is a Northern Irish lawyer.

He has been described as one of the most feared defamation lawyers in the world, having represented the likes of Harrison Ford, Justin Timberlake, Jennifer Lopez, Liam Neeson, Britney Spears, Ashton Kutcher, and Uri Geller as well as many others from the worlds of politics, music, film, entertainment and sport.

Having made his name taking action against traditional media outlets, he has since sought to challenge social media corporations, calling for increased regulation of these corporations, many of which have their European headquarters in Ireland.

== Early life and education ==
Born in Bangor, County Down, Tweed attended Bangor Grammar School and Queen's University Belfast where he read Law. After attaining his LLB, he attended the Institute of Professional Legal Studies where he qualified as a solicitor in 1978. He joined the Belfast firm Johnsons the same year he qualified and was made partner in 1983. In 2017, Tweed set up TWEED, an international boutique law firm with offices in Belfast, Dublin and London. The firm provided a bespoke international approach specialising in media law and commercial litigation matters. In 2020, the firm was acquired by Gateley for £2 million and rebranded as Gateley Tweed. In more recent years, he has established an independent firm WP Tweed & Co. which hosts offices in Belfast, Dublin, and London.

== Notable cases ==
One of Tweed's earliest libel actions of note was against the Sunday World over the reporting of two local senior barristers fighting over a chocolate eclair in a Holywood cake shop. The case was contested in front of a Belfast jury who awarded both men £50,000 each.

Tweed represented Barney Eastwood against the World Boxing Association in 1992. He also represented him in libel cases against Arena magazine, BBC, and Sunday World. Eastwood was awarded undisclosed, but reportedly substantial, damages in all three cases.

He acted on behalf of former First Minister of Northern Ireland, Arlene Foster, in a defamation case against television personality Christian Jessen. Foster was awarded £125,000 in damages in relation to a defamatory tweet.

In May 2025, Tweed represented Gerry Adams in a successful defamation action against the BBC. The former Sinn Féin president was awarded €100,000 in damages after alleging that he was defamed by a 2016 BBC Spotlight programme and accompanying online article, which accused him of authorising the murder of British informant Denis Donaldson.

Tweed has represented Liam Neeson, Britney Spears, Jennifer Lopez, Justin Timberlake, Kelsey Grammer, Nicolas Cage, Harrison Ford, Chris de Burgh, Neil Jordan, Uri Geller, Patrick Kielty, Colin Farrell, Keith Duffy, The Corrs, Ashton Kutcher, Johnny Depp, Jeffrey Epstein and Sylvester Stallone.

In 2014 he represented X Factor judge and band manager Louis Walsh in which Walsh was awarded €500,000 in damages from The Sun for a libellous headline.

Tweed has also acted for journalists including litigation for Stephen Nolan and Miriam O'Callaghan with other reported cases including Liam Clarke and Susanne Breen.

He has also been involved in multiple defamation actions against UK and US-based internet book distributors, requiring the issue of the largest number of Writs in respect of the publication of one book.

Tweed also represented Dr. Jorge Segovia, a Spanish businessman and former President of the Asociación Nacional de Fútbol Profesional (ANFP), in an action against Amazon. It was alleged that he was defamed in relation to the series El Presidente, which was released exclusively on Amazon Prime in 2020. This case concluded via settlement in 2024.

On July 14, 2023, Dutch newspaper NRC Handelsblad reported that the United Arab Emirates engaged Tweed to help suppress social media mentions about the plight of prisoner Maryam al-Baloeshi. According to media reports, al-Baloeshi has been beaten, humiliated and threatened with rape while detained in the UAE. NRC's report stated that Tweed bragged in an email to the UAE's secret service about his success in quashing media attention regarding Al-Baloeshi.

== Media appearances ==
Tweed is a regular contributor on media law issues in both printed, online and television journalism. He has made many appearances on UK and International news services such as the BBC, UTV, Ireland AM, Al Jazeera, and Bloomberg News. His acting for magician Uri Gellar against CNN and The Sun and Richard O'Donovan and Forbes was the subject of the BBC documentary See You in Court which was broadcast in 2011.

He has also addressed the Oxford Union and Feile an Phobail in Belfast, as well as various International Bar Associations and business groups.

== Recognition and memberships ==
Tweed has been listed as the top tier (Band 1) lawyers in both Defamation/Reputation Management and Media & Entertainment fields of the Chambers and Partners guide."

He has also addressed the Parliamentary Joint Committee on the draft Defamation Bill and the Northern Ireland Assembly Committee on the Defamation Act 2013.

He is listed in Chambers Directory as a media and professional indemnity lawyer, a member of the Ministry of Justice Defamation and other Judicial Committees, Member of the Law Society of England and Wales, 1993, Member the Law Society of Ireland, 1999, Member of the Law Society of Northern Ireland, 1978, is registered as a Foreign Legal Consultant, California State Bar and JAMS (alternative dispute resolution).

== Publishing ==
In 2024, Tweed published his memoir From Holywood to Hollywood: My Life as an International Libel Lawyer to the Rich and Famous. He also published Privacy and Libel Law; The Clash With Press Freedom in 2012. He is also a regular contributor to publications such as Huffington Post, The Guardian and The Global Legal Post.
