= Issack Mabushi =

Tanzanian boxer (born 1956)

Personal information
- Nationality: Tanzanian
- Born: 17 February 1956 (age 69)

Sport
- Sport: Boxing

Issack Mabushi (born 17 February 1956) is a Tanzanian boxer. He competed in the men's featherweight event at the 1980 Summer Olympics. At the 1980 Summer Olympics, he lost to Barry McGuigan of Ireland.
