= Tony Willis =

English boxer (born 1960)

Personal information
- Nationality: English
- Born: Anthony Willis; 17 June 1960 (age 66) Liverpool, England
- Weight: Lightweight

Boxing career
- Stance: Southpaw

Boxing record
- Total fights: 29
- Wins: 25
- Win by KO: 16
- Losses: 4
- Draws: 0
- No contests: 0

Olympic medal record

Men's Boxing
Bronze medal – third place	1980 Moscow	Light Welterweight

Anthony Willis (born 17 June 1960) is a former British professional boxer who competed from 1981 to 1989. Willis won the Lonsdale Belt and won a light welterweight bronze medal at the 1980 Summer Olympics. As a professional, he held the British lightweight boxing title between 1985 and 1987.

== Early life ==
Willis was born in Liverpool.

== 1980 Olympic results ==
Representing Great Britain, Willis was a bronze medalist in the light welterweight (63.5 kg) class at the 1980 Olympic Games in Moscow. His results were:

- Round of 32: Defeated Jaime Franco (Brazil) on points, 5–0
- Round of 16: Defeated Shadrach Odhiambo (Sweden) on points, 5–0
- Quarterfinal: Defeated William Lyimo (Tanzania) by third-round knockout
- Semifinal: Lost to Patrizio Oliva (Italy) on points, 0–5 (was awarded bronze medal)

== Amateur titles ==
- 1980 Amateur Boxing Association British light-welterweight champion
- 1981 A.B.A. Light welterweight champion

== Professional career ==
Willis had his first professional fight in September 1981, beating Winston McKenzie. He won his first thirteen fights putting himself in line for a British lightweight title fight. In December 1983 he fought George Feeney for his British lightweight title. He lost when the fight was stopped in the first round.

In May 1985 he fought for the vacant British lightweight title against Ian McLeod, winning on points over twelve rounds. In November 1985 he defended his British title against Paul Chance. Willis won when the fight was stopped in the fifth round, Chance having been knocked down three times. In May 1986 he defended his title against Steve Boyle in Manchester, winning by a technical knockout in the ninth round.

In September 1987 he defended his title for the third time, against Scottish boxer, Alex Dickson. The fight was held in Glasgow, and Dickson won on points over twelve rounds to take Willis's title. After losing his title, Willis continued fighting but retired in May 1989 after being knocked out in a light-welterweight fight by Pat Barrett.

== See also ==
- List of British lightweight boxing champions
