= Ryszard Czerwiński =

Polish boxer

Personal information
- Nationality: Polish
- Born: 31 October 1954 (age 70); Gorzów Wielkopolski, Poland

Sport
- Sport: Boxing

Ryszard Czerwiński (born 31 October 1954) is a Polish boxer. He competed in the men's bantamweight event at the 1980 Summer Olympics.
