= Jaime Sodré =

Brazilian boxer

Personal information
- Full name: Jaime Sodré de França
- Nationality: Brazilian
- Born: 7 December 1955 (age 69)

Sport
- Sport: Boxing

Jaime Sodré de França (born 7 December 1955) is a Brazilian boxer. He competed in the men's light welterweight event at the 1980 Summer Olympics. At the 1980 Summer Olympics, he lost to Tony Willis of Great Britain.
