= Hannu Kaislama =

Finnish boxer

Hannu Juhani Olavi Kaislama (born August 13, 1956 in Suonenjoki) is a retired male boxer from Finland, who represented his native country at the 1980 Summer Olympics in Moscow, Soviet Union. There he lost in the first round of the men's featherweight (– 57 kg) division to East Germany's eventual gold medalist Rudi Fink.

== 1980 Olympic results ==
Below is the record of Hannu Kaislama, a Finnish featherweight boxer who competed at the 1980 Moscow Olympics:

- Round of 32: lost to Rudi Fink (East Germany) by decision, 0-5
