= Ganapathy Manoharan =

Indian boxer

Personal information
- Nationality: Indian
- Born: 2 June 1958 (age 66); Vellore, Tamil Nadu, India

Sport
- Sport: Boxing

Ganapathy Manoharan (born 2 June 1958) is an Indian boxer. He competed in the men's bantamweight event at the 1980 Summer Olympics.
