= Juan Carazo =

Puerto Rican boxer (born 1964)

- Born: October 10, 1964 (age 62); Ponce, Puerto Rico
- Other names: "Curie", "El Acorazado de Bolsillo"
- Occupation: Boxer
- Known for: two time world boxing title challenger

Juan Carazo Serrano (born October 10, 1964) is a former boxer from Caguas, Puerto Rico.

Carazo was considered to be a boxing reincarnation of Wilfred Benítez or Wilfredo Gómez by many of his fans, and he won his first five professional bouts by knockout in 1984. By his sixth bout, however, he had to rise off the canvas against Julio Guerrero of the Dominican Republic before winning on an eight-round unanimous decision.

In 1985, Carazo started to campaign in Curaçao, where he won a few fights. Then, he had another fight in Puerto Rico, this time at Mario Morales Coliseum, and the fight was telecasted all across the island. In it, his opponent, named Tom Elston, wore long pants, showed his tongue at the camera and tried to bite Carazo. Carazo nevertheless won by a knockout in six.

Carazo had a fight scheduled on Telemundo Puerto Rico in 1987 against a foreign opponent, in an undercard where Wilfredo Vazquez was supposed to face another opponent. Both of their opponents had visa trouble and at the last minute, the card's promoters decided that in order to save the card, they'd put Carazo, a Jr. Bantamweight, and Vazquez, a Bantamweight, against each other. Carazo suffered his first loss, by a knockout in the first round.

Carazo came back to beat former flyweight world champion Santos Laciar by a decision in 12 at Caguas in 1988, and was given a chance to challenge the late Gilberto Roman for the WBC world Jr. Bantamweight title in 1989, in Inglewood, California. He was dropped in round four, but seconds after getting off, he dropped Roman near the ring's ropes. He was one second away from becoming a world champion, but Roman recovered, got up at the count of nine and proceeded to win by a unanimous 12-round decision.

On September 9 of that same year, a second world title opportunity came, when he faced the WBO world champion, the also late José Ruíz Matos in San Juan. This time, he was knocked out in the first round, and, for all purposes, his boxing career was over after this.

Carazo then went to Chile in 1992, losing a decision to Chilean fighter Bernardo Mendoza. He and his team stayed in Chile longer to protest the decision, and during their time there, they went to the house of a former South American champion and took monetary help and toys for him and his family.

Carazo decided to retire after that, but in 1996, he tried a comeback in Ponce, Puerto Rico, losing by a knockout in five rounds to an unknown boxer, Angel Castellar, who was 2-5-2 coming into the fight.

Carazo also lost to former world champion Jose Quirino, to Junior Jones by a close, ten round majority decision, and to Rafael del Valle.

Carazo had a record of 25 wins and 9 losses, with 19 wins by knockout.

Carazo is a member of the Caguas sports hall of fame.

== After boxing ==
Carazo, who is an expert in geometry and trigonometry, took an electronics test and passed with a perfect score. He then joined a computer factory; and now works as a repairman for the Claro network in Puerto Rico.

== Personal life ==
Carazo is married to Ana Maria Carrion since 1983; the couple has two daughters and two grandsons.

== See also ==
- List of Puerto Ricans
- Bairoa Gym - Carazo's home gym
- Alberto Mercado - Carazo's friend and gym mate
