= Michael Anthony (boxer) =

Guyanese boxer (born 1957)

Olympic medal record

Men's boxing

Representing Guyana
Bronze medal – third place	1980 Moscow	Bantamweight

Michael Parris (born October 4, 1957), aka Michael Anthony, is a retired boxer from Guyana, who competed in the bantamweight (54 kg) division at the 1980 Summer Olympics in Moscow, Soviet Union. There he earned a bronze medal, becoming Guyana's first ever Olympic medalist. He was born in Georgetown, Guyana.

== 1980 Olympic results ==
Below is the record of Michael Anthony, a Guyanese bantamweight boxer who competed at the 1980 Moscow Olympics:

- Round of 32: Defeated Nureni Gbadamosi (Niger) by decision, 5-0
- Round of 16: Defeated Fayez Zaghloul (Syria) by decision, 3-2
- Quarterfinal: Defeated Daniel Zaragoza (Mexico) TKO 2
- Semifinal: Lost to Juan Hernandez (Cuba) by decision, 0-5 (was awarded bronze medal)
