= Charles Dramiga =

Ugandan sprinter

Personal information
- Nationality: Ugandan
- Born: 15 January 1954 (age 72)

Sport
- Sport: Sprinting
- Event: 400 metres

Charles Dramiga (born 15 January 1954) is a Ugandan sprinter. He competed in the men's 400 metres at the 1980 Summer Olympics.

Competing for the New Mexico Lobos track and field team, Dramiga won the 1976 600 yards at the NCAA Division I Indoor Track and Field Championships.
