= Boualem Bel Alouane =

Algerian boxer (born 1961)

Personal information
- Nationality: Algerian
- Born: 13 March 1961 (age 64)

Sport
- Sport: Boxing

Boualem Bel Alouane (born 13 March 1961) is an Algerian boxer. He competed in the men's light welterweight event at the 1980 Summer Olympics. At the 1980 Summer Olympics, he defeated Barrington Cambridge of Guyana, before losing to Ace Rusevski of Yugoslavia.
