= José Aguilar (boxer) =

Cuban boxer (1958–2014)

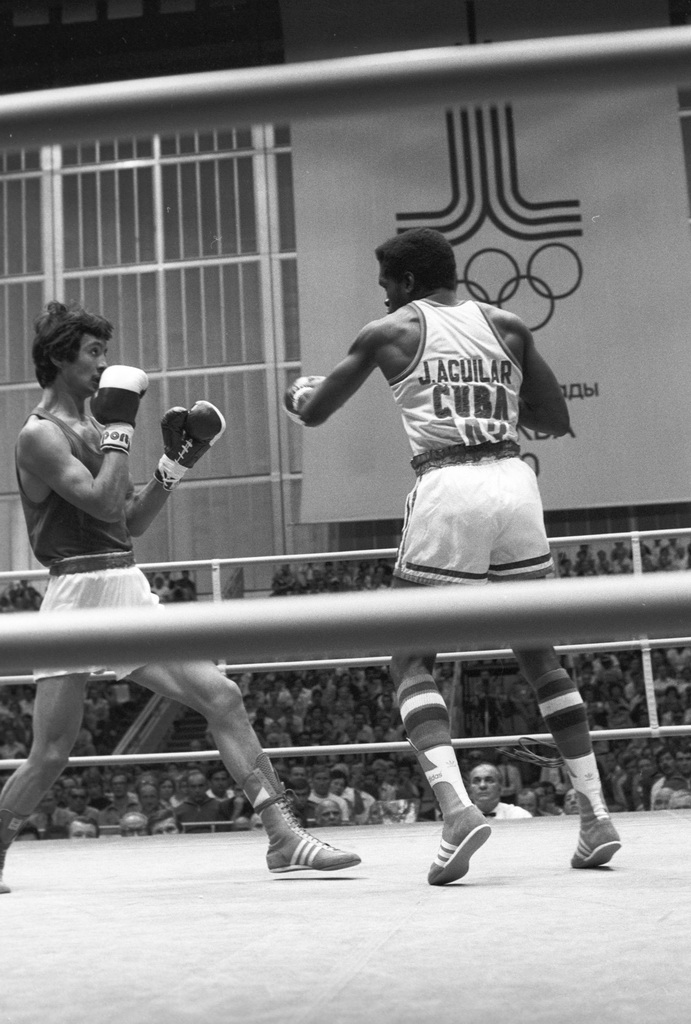
- Serik Konakbayev and Jose Aguilar (1980)

Personal information
- Full name: José Aguilar Pulsar
- Nationality: Cuban
- Born: 19 December 1958
- Died: 4 April 2014 (aged 55)
- Height: 1.73 m (5 ft 8 in)
- Weight: 64 kg (141 lb)

Sport
- Sport: Boxing
- Weight class: Light Welterweight
Medal record
Olympic Games
Bronze medal – third place	1980 Moscow	Light Welterweight
Pan American Games
Bronze medal – third place	1979 Caracas	Light Welterweight
Silver medal – second place	1983 Caracas	Welterweight

José Aguilar Pulsar (19 December 1958 – 4 April 2014) was a Cuban boxer. He won the Light Welterweight bronze medal at the 1980 Summer Olympics. He died in Guantánamo on 4 April 2014 from a cerebral infarction.

== 1980 Olympic results ==
- Round of 32: Defeated Martin Brerton (Ireland) by TKO 1
- Round of 16: Defeated Ryu Bun-Hwa (North Korea) by decision, 4–1
- Quarterfinal: Defeated Farouk Jawad (Iraq) by TKO 3
- Semifinal: Lost to Serik Konakbayev (USSR) by decision, 1-4 (was awarded bronze medal)
