= Bairoa Gym =

Boxing gym located in Caguas, Puerto Rico

Bairoa Gym is a boxing gym located in Caguas, Puerto Rico. El gimnasio Bairoa, as it is known in Spanish, is the most famous boxing gym in Puerto Rico because of the list of world champions and top contenders who have trained there.

== 2005 shooting attack ==
On March 4, 2005, Bairoa boxer Joseph Serrano, a gold medalist at Central American and Caribbean Games competition as an amateur and 1-0 prospect, was standing near the gym's front door, when he was shot three times by an assailant. Serrano was picked up by his father Edwin and by fellow boxer Victor Bisbal and taken to a hospital, where he recuperated from the gunshots. The shooting's alleged planner, Jonathan Huertas Claudio was sentenced to 15 years probation for paying $2,000 to Jorge Davila to shoot Serrano. Davila was sentenced to 6 months in jail and 11 years probation.

== Notable boxers ==
World champions and well known boxers who have used this facility include Alfredo Escalera, Héctor Camacho, Julian Solís, Henry Bruseles, Juan Cruz, Alberto Mercado, Jesus Rojas, Javier Garcia, Jose Miguel Cotto, Juan Carazo, Miguel Cotto, Daniel Rosario, José Rodriguez, and many more. The gym was managed since 1976 (year when it was inaugurated) by Cuban trainer Julian Delgado, until Evangelista Cotto replaced him during the late 90s. Bairoa Gym's creator Delgado died on December 14, 2021, at the age of 91.

Miguel Cotto became the gym's first "homegrown" world champion when he conquered the WBO's world Jr. Welterweight title by knocking out Kelson Pinto of Brazil in six rounds in 2004. Cotto built a career that included various world titles and fights with Antonio Margarito, Sergio Martinez, Manny Pacquiao, Floyd Mayweather Jr. and Saul Alvarez.
