= Patrizio Oliva =

Italian boxer (born 1959)

Personal information
- Nickname: Sparviero
- Born: 28 January 1959 (age 67) Naples, Italy
- Height: 177 cm (5 ft 9 1/2 in)
- Weight: Light welterweight; Welterweight

Boxing career
- Stance: Orthodox

Boxing record
- Total fights: 59
- Wins: 57
- Win by KO: 20
- Losses: 2
Medal record
Men's Boxing
Representing Italy
Olympic Games
Gold medal – first place	1980 Moscow	Light welterweight
European Championships
Silver medal – second place	1979 Cologne	Light welterweight
Mediterranean Games
Bronze medal – third place	1979 Split	Light welterweight

Patrizio Oliva (born 28 January 1959) is an Italian former professional boxer, who won the gold medal in the light welterweight division at the 1980 Moscow Olympics as an amateur and the WBA light welterweight title as a professional.

== Early life ==
Patrizio is one of seven brothers born to Rocco and Catena Oliva.

Oliva was introduced to boxing through his father Rocco and his brother Mario's passion for the sport. One of his brothers, Ciro, died, and Oliva dedicated a number of his fights to the memory of Ciro and also named his first son after him.

== Amateur career ==
Oliva had a successful amateur career and won 93 of his 96 fights winning the Italian, European and Olympic titles.

At the international level, Oliva won the 1978 European Junior Championships in Dublin, Ireland and a silver medal at the 1979 European Senior Championships in Cologne, West Germany. Oliva was beaten by Soviet boxer Serik Konakbayev in the final of the Cologne championship and stated that his fight against Konakbayev was the hardest of his career. The following year he represented his country and boxed at the Olympic Games for Italy and would again face Konakbaev.

=== 1980 Olympics ===
Following two years of winning European titles, Oliva competed in the blue vest of Italy at the 1980 Summer Olympics, which were held in Moscow, USSR.

Oliva competed in the Light Welterweight (– 63.5 kg) division. He defeated Beninese Aurelien Agnan in his first contest after the referee stopped the contest in the first round. In his second contest, he stopped Syrian Farez Halabi in the third round and beat Yugoslavian Ace Rusevski in the quarter-final. In the semi-final, Oliva faced British boxer Tony Willis. This fight went the full three-round distance, and Oliva was once again victorious after all five judges gave him the decision.

On 2 August 1980, Oliva once again met his opponent from the final of the 1979 European championships, Serik Konakbaev, in the final of the Olympics. This time Oliva reversed the result by beating Konakbaev in front of his home crowd to take the gold medal and win the Val Barker Trophy for being "Outstanding Boxer" at the 1980 Olympics.

==== Olympic results ====
- Defeated Aurelien Agnan (Benin) RSC-1
- Defeated Farez Halabi (Syria) RSC-3
- Defeated Ace Rusevski (Yugoslavia) 3–2
- Defeated Tony Willis (Great Britain) 5–0
- Defeated Serik Konakbayev (Soviet Union) 4–1

== Professional career ==
=== Debut ===
Within two months of winning gold at the Moscow Olympics, Oliva turned professional. His first fight was on 11 October 1980 against Italian-based Brazilian Nelson Gomes in Naples, Italy. Oliva defeated Gomes on points over six rounds to secure his first victory as a professional.

=== Early fights ===
After Oliva's first win in the professional ranks, he then went on a run of victories. From October 1980 to August 1981, Oliva won thirteen straight fights before he fought for his first title belt, the Italian light welterweight title against Giuseppe Russi on 4 November 1981 in Ischia. Oliva handled Russi with ease, winning the title with a second-round knockout. Oliva followed his first title win by winning a further eleven straight fights between November 1981 and October 1982.

=== European title ===
This left Oliva with a record of 25 victories with no losses and earned him a fight against Frenchman Robert Gambini for a chance to win his first major title, the European light welterweight title. Oliva was again victorious and took the title from Gambini on points over twelve rounds. Gambini retired from boxing after the fight.

Oliva continued his run of career victories by winning his first 48 fights, including a victory over Ubaldo Nestor Sacco in 1986 to capture the WBA light welterweight title. Oliva defended the title twice before losing to Juan Martin Coggi by KO in 1987. After a two-year rest, Oliva came back and went on to win his next 9 fights, setting up a shot at WBC welterweight title holder James McGirt in 1992. Oliva lost via unanimous decision, and retired after the bout with a record of 57–2–0.

== Personal life ==
Oliva has been married twice and has four children. He's an atheist.

== Professional boxing record ==
59 fights	57 wins	2 losses
By knockout	20	1
By decision	36	1
By disqualification	1	0

No.	Result	Record	Opponent	Type	Round, time	Date	Location	Notes
59	Loss	57–2	Buddy McGirt	UD	12 (12)	1992-06-25	Acquaflash di Licola, Licola, Italy	For WBC welterweight title
58	Win	57–1	Antoine Fernandez	PTS	12 (12)	1992-02-19	San Pellegrino Terme, Italy	Retained European welterweight title
57	Win	56–1	Jose Luis Saldivia	PTS	10 (10)	1991-12-04	San Pellegrino Terme, Italy	
56	Win	55–1	Juan Carlos Ortiz	PTS	8 (8)	1991-10-05	Laigueglia, Italy	
55	Win	54–1	Errol McDonald	DQ	12 (12)	1991-06-08	La Spezia, Italy	Retained European welterweight title
54	Win	53–1	Adolfo Omar Arce Rossi	UD	8 (8)	1991-03-23	Vallecrosia, Italy	
53	Win	52–1	Kirkland Laing	UD	12 (12)	1990-11-14	Casinò di Campione, Campione d'Italia, Italy	Won European welterweight title
52	Win	51–1	Jorge Argentino Tejada	PTS	10 (10)	1990-07-20	Sarno, Italy	
51	Win	50–1	Anthony Stephens	PTS	8 (8)	1989-12-13	San Giuseppe Vesuviano, Italy	
50	Win	49–1	Howard Stewart	UD	8 (8)	1989-07-05	Praiano, Italy	
49	Loss	48–1	Martín Coggi	KO	3 (15)	1987-07-04	Palazzo Dello Sport, Ribera, Italy	Lost WBA light-welterweight title
48	Win	48–0	Rodolfo González	UD	15 (15)	1987-01-10	Teatro Tenda, Agrigento, Italy	Retained WBA light-welterweight title
47	Win	47–0	Brian Brunette	TKO	3 (15)	1986-09-06	Palasport di Napoli di Furoi, Naples, Italy	Retained WBA light-welterweight title
46	Win	46–0	Eric Martin	PTS	10 (10)	1986-07-30	Capo d'Orlando, Italy	
45	Win	45–0	Ford Jennings	PTS	10 (10)	1986-06-14	Praiano, Italy	
44	Win	44–0	Ubaldo Néstor Sacco	SD	15 (15)	1986-03-15	Stade Louis II, Fontvieille, Monaco	Won WBA light-welterweight title
43	Win	43–0	Rick Kaiser	TKO	4 (10)	1986-01-21	Pozzuoli, Italy	
42	Win	42–0	Mark Lassein	UD	10 (10)	1985-12-08	Maurice Richard Arena, Montreal, Quebec, Canada	
41	Win	41–0	Steve Mitchell	PTS	8 (8)	1985-10-31	Viterbo, Italy	
40	Win	40–0	Nick Parker	PTS	8 (8)	1985-07-21	Casinò di Campione, Campione d'Italia, Italy	
39	Win	39–0	Alessandro Scapecchi	UD	12 (12)	1985-03-27	Nocera, Italy	Retained European light-welterweight title
38	Win	38–0	Michel Giroud	RTD	8 (12)	1984-12-15	Catanzaro, Italy	Retained European light-welterweight title
37	Win	37–0	Tusikoleta Nkalankete	PTS	12 (12)	1984-09-04	Acciaroli, Italy	Retained European light-welterweight title
36	Win	36–0	Ali Kareem Muhammad	PTS	8 (8)	1984-06-23	Campione d'Italia, Italy	
35	Win	35–0	Jose Ramon Gomez Fouz	TKO	4 (12)	1984-04-28	San Giuseppe Vesuviano, Italy	Retained European light-welterweight title
34	Win	34–0	Kevin Austin	PTS	8 (8)	1984-03-23	Chiavari, Italy	
33	Win	33–0	Charlie Allen	TKO	3 (?)	1984-02-22	Gragnano, Italy	
32	Win	32–0	Jerome Artis	PTS	10 (10)	1984-01-28	Palazzo Dello Sport, Marsala, Italy	
31	Win	31–0	Anthony Murray	TKO	6 (?)	1983-12-21	Pozzuoli, Italy	
30	Win	30–0	Juan Jose Gimenez	UD	12 (12)	1983-10-14	Palasport di San Siro, Milan, Italy	Retained European light-welterweight title
29	Win	29–0	Antonio Guinaldo	PTS	12 (12)	1983-07-31	Rapallo, Italy	Retained European light-welterweight title
28	Win	28–0	Jean-Marie Touati	TKO	6 (12)	1983-05-25	Santa Margherita di Belice, Italy	Retained European light-welterweight title
27	Win	27–0	Francisco León	TKO	11 (12)	1983-03-19	Palazzetto dello Sport, Naples, Italy	Retained European light-welterweight title
26	Win	26–0	Robert Gambini	PTS	12 (12)	1983-01-05	Ischia, Italy	Won European light-welterweight title
25	Win	25–0	Dave McCabe	PTS	8 (8)	1982-10-06	Gragnano, Italy	
24	Win	24–0	Luciano Navarra	PTS	12 (12)	1982-09-01	Forio, Italy	Retained Italian light-welterweight title
23	Win	23–0	Andre Holyk	TKO	4 (10)	1982-08-08	Marina di Camerota, Italy	
22	Win	22–0	Hugues Samo	PTS	8 (8)	1982-05-29	Milan, Italy	
21	Win	21–0	Samuel Serunjogi	PTS	8 (8)	1982-05-20	Vieste, Italy	
20	Win	20–0	Giuseppe Martinese	PTS	12 (12)	1982-04-11	Forio, Italy	Retained Italian light-welterweight title
19	Win	19–0	Francesco Gallo	PTS	8 (8)	1982-03-06	Giovinazzo, Italy	
18	Win	18–0	Bruno Simili	TKO	8 (12)	1982-02-11	Naples, Italy	Retained Italian light-welterweight title
17	Win	17–0	Antonio Antino	TKO	3 (12)	1981-12-27	Forio, Italy	Retained Italian light-welterweight title
16	Win	16–0	Mosimo Maeleke	PTS	8 (8)	1981-12-11	Milan, Italy	
15	Win	15–0	Rafael Gutierrez	RTD	5 (?)	1981-11-27	Bologna, Italy	
14	Win	14–0	Giuseppe Russi	KO	2 (12)	1981-11-04	Forio, Italy	Won Italian light-welterweight title
13	Win	13–0	Patrizio Burini	RTD	1 (8)	1981-08-09	Camaiore, Italy	
12	Win	12–0	Charles Jurietti	RTD	4 (?)	1981-07-01	Formia, Italy	
11	Win	11–0	George Burton	UD	6 (6)	1981-06-04	Felt Forum, New York City, New York, U.S.	
10	Win	10–0	Francesco Gallo	TKO	7 (?)	1981-05-15	Padua, Italy	
9	Win	9–0	Rene Martin	TKO	4 (8)	1981-05-01	Piacenza, Italy	
8	Win	8–0	Rosario di Tommaso	TKO	2 (8)	1981-04-04	Campobasso, Italy	
7	Win	7–0	Luigi Curcetti	PTS	8 (8)	1981-03-20	Naples, Italy	
6	Win	6–0	Mohatar II	TKO	4 (?)	1981-03-06	Milan, Italy	
5	Win	5–0	Georges Cotin	PTS	6 (6)	1981-02-23	Rome, Italy	
4	Win	4–0	Mohammed el Kadoumi	PTS	6 (6)	1980-12-26	Bologna, Italy	
3	Win	3–0	Eloi de Souza	TKO	6 (6)	1980-11-08	Latina, Italy	
2	Win	2–0	Benedicto dos Santos	PTS	6 (6)	1980-10-25	Pordenone, Italy	
1	Win	1–0	Nelson Gomes	PTS	6 (6)	1980-10-11	Naples, Italy	

== See also ==
- List of world light-welterweight boxing champions

Sporting positions
Regional boxing titles
Preceded by Giuseppe Russi	Italian light-welterweight champion 4 November 1981 – 5 January 1983; Won European title	Vacant Title next held by Giuseppe Martinese
Preceded by Robert Gambini	European light-welterweight champion 5 January 1983 – 1985; Vacated	Vacant Title next held by Terry Marsh
Preceded by Kirkland Laing	European welterweight champion 14 November 1990 – 1992; Vacated	Vacant Title next held by Ludovic Proto
World boxing titles
Preceded by Ubaldo Néstor Sacco	WBA light-welterweight champion 15 March 1986 – 4 July 1987	Succeeded by Martín Coggi
