= Titi Cercel =

Romanian boxer

Personal information
- Nationality: Romanian
- Born: 15 May 1959
- Died: December 2016 (aged 57)

Sport
- Sport: Boxing

Titi Cercel (15 May 1959 – December 2016) was a Romanian boxer. He competed in the men's featherweight event at the 1980 Summer Olympics. At the 1980 Summer Olympics, he defeated Róbert Gönczi of Hungary, before losing to Adolfo Horta of Cuba.
