= Margarit Atanasov =

Bulgarian boxer (born 1958)

Personal information
- Nationality: Bulgarian
- Born: 20 February 1958 (age 67)

Sport
- Sport: Boxing

Margarit Atanasov (born 20 February 1958) is a Bulgarian boxer. He competed in the men's light welterweight event at the 1980 Summer Olympics. At the 1980 Summer Olympics, he lost to Ace Rusevski of Yugoslavia.
