= Martin Brereton =

Irish boxer

Personal information
- Nationality: Irish
- Born: 20 February 1961 (age 64)

Sport
- Sport: Boxing

Martin Brereton (born 20 February 1961) is an Irish former boxer. He is best known for competing in the men's light welterweight event at the 1980 Summer Olympics in Moscow.

== Biography ==
Martin Brereton comes from an Edenderry family known for their association with Irish boxing. His father, Sean "Dutch" Brereton, built the boxing ring used in the Muhammad Ali vs. Al "Blue" Lewis fight in Croke Park, while his brother, Liam Brereton, coaches IABA boxers at St. Brigid's Boxing Club.

In 1976, Brereton competed for the All Ireland Amateur Championship, where he was defeated by Barry McGuigan in the final.

At the 1979 Irish National Senior Finals, Brereton competed in the lightweight event, losing to Seán Doyle. The next year, Brereton competed again as a lightweight at the 1980 Irish National Senior Finals, this time losing to Paul Malone.

Brereton travelled to Italy in 1980 for the Italian Youth Championship, where he earned a bronze medal. Later that year, Brereton represented Ireland at the Moscow Summer Olympics as a light welterweight, where he lost to Cuba's eventual bronze medallist José Aguilar by technical knockout.
