= Sándor Farkas (boxer) =

Hungarian boxer

Personal information
- Nationality: Hungarian
- Born: 19 January 1961 (age 64); Salgótarján, Hungary

Sport
- Sport: Boxing

Sándor Farkas (born 19 January 1961) is a Hungarian boxer. He competed in the men's bantamweight event at the 1980 Summer Olympics. At the 1980 Summer Olympics, he lost in his fight to Juan Hernandez of Cuba.
