= Joseph Serrano =

Puerto Rican boxer (born 1984)

Personal information
- Born: April 18, 1984 (age 42) Caguas, Puerto Rico
Medal record
Men's Boxing
Representing Puerto Rico
Central American and Caribbean Games
Gold medal – first place	2002 San Salvador	Light Flyweight

Joseph Serrano (born April 18, 1984 in Caguas, Puerto Rico) is a Puerto Rican who was an amateur boxing star.

Serrano had an award-winning career as an amateur. A member of the Bairoa Gym boxing team, he met, among others, Miguel Cotto during his career as an amateur boxer. Cotto and Serrano forged a friendship as they belonged to the same team.

Serrano joined the Puerto Rican Olympic boxing team that participated in Athens. He was widely expected to, at least, compete for a spot in the final rounds of his division, but he lost in the first round of the competition. As a matter of a fact, Alex de Jesús was the only boxer from Puerto Rico to win an Olympic fight from 1996 to 2012. He qualified for the Olympic Games by ending up in second place at the 1st AIBA American 2004 Olympic Qualifying Tournament in Tijuana, Mexico.

Serrano then awaited a relatively long time to make a decision as far as to which promoter he would sign with as a professional fighter, but he finally decided to sign with Bob Arum and Arum's Top Rank company. By the time he signed his contract, he had become the last 2004 Olympic boxer from Puerto Rico to turn professional.

Serrano made what was his first, and probably will be his only, professional bout on February 26, 2005, as part of the undercard where Cotto knocked out DeMarcus Corley. Serrano beat William Vega by a first round knockout that day.

On March 4, Serrano was shot to the head, leg and shoulder on the parking lot at Bairoa Gym, as he stood near the gym's door. He was injured critically, and, because the bullet to his head landed inside his brain, he had to undergo emergency surgery. Serrano was in critical but stable condition at a local hospital. A person has been identified as a suspect: the former boyfriend of a woman that Serrano is friends with. Soon after the shooting, other motives, such as a drug deal gone wrong, for example, were ruled out by police because Serrano is known to be a Christian without any ties with problematic individuals.

Whether Serrano will go on boxing as a professional or not remains to be seen, but, it is highly questionable that he will, because of the type of injury that the gunshot to the head produced: according to doctors, he had a brain hemorrhage, similar to those that have led some boxers to die after a fight. Because of this, it would be an educated guess to say that the injury will prevent him to fight on in a future. Serrano was in a coma.

In what can be called an irony, Serrano had declared, one day before his fight with Vega, that the only thing he ever wanted to be since he was a little kid, was a professional boxer.

Later on, a spokesman for Serrano's family announced that Serrano had shown slight improvement. According to the spokesman's report, Serrano's intracraneal pressure had been stabilized at 25 degrees of heat (10 degrees or less are considered normal, 40 degrees or more are considered very dangerous in the human brain).

On the weekend that followed, his intracraneal pressure lowered to twelve, giving doctors reason to believe that he would be able to recuperate from the attack on him. The bullet on his brain was taken out after a complicated second operation to that area of his body, leading to the improvement in intracraneal pressure.

While Serrano continued recuperating, on March 15, a still unnamed suspect was arrested and jailed without bond, because the case's judge considered him too dangerous to be left outside jail.

Serrano eventually recuperated and left the hospital, returning to the Bairoa Gym as a special helper for Cotto during Cotto's training process for his title defense against Mohammed Abdullaev.

The family moved to Pennsylvania to continue with medical treatment for Joseph.

Jonathan Huertas Claudio was sentenced to 15 years probatory for paying $2,000 to Jorge Davila, who shot Joseph. Davila was sentenced to 6 months in jail and 11 years probatory.

Huertas Claudio's probatory may have been revoked since he was caught DUI later on, and police pressed charges for beating his girlfriend in August 2007.

== See also ==
- List of Puerto Ricans
