= Ayodele Peters =

Nigerian boxer

Personal information
- Nationality: Nigerian
- Born: 21 May 1957 (age 68) Lagos, Nigeria

Sport
- Sport: Boxing

Ayodele Peters (born 21 May 1957) is a Nigerian boxer. He competed in the men's light welterweight event at the 1980 Summer Olympics.
