= Barney Eastwood =

Irish bookmaker and boxing promoter (1932–2020)

Bernard Joseph Eastwood (1932 – 9 March 2020) was an Irish bookmaker and boxing promoter. Eastwood was introduced to boxing through weekly shows at a US air base near his home and by the tutelage he received from a school teacher from County Cork.

Eastwood was born in Cookstown, County Tyrone, Northern Ireland. By age 19 he was married to his wife Frances and living in Carrickfergus, where he ran a pub and helped operate a local boxing club. In the late 1950s he organised small boxing shows in Belfast.

He later became well known as a successful bookmaker. Among the boxers he promoted were Barry McGuigan and Dave McAuley. After McGuigan's unexpected defeat to Steve Cruz in Las Vegas, their relationship deteriorated, leading to a costly legal dispute. Eastwood was represented by media lawyer Paul Tweed.

During the 1980s and 1990s, Eastwood ran "Eastwood's Gym" along with John Breen on Belfast's King Street. In February 2008 it was announced that Eastwood would be selling his chain of 54 betting shops to the UK chain Ladbrokes for £135 million.

He died in Ulster Hospital, Dundonald, on the outskirts of Belfast on 9 March 2020, aged 87, after a short illness.

== Notable fighters promoted ==
- Barry McGuigan
- Crisanto España
- Paul Hodkinson
- Noel Magee
- Ray Close
- Dave Boy McAuley
- Víctor Córdoba
- Fabrice Benichou
- Steve Collins
