= Carlos González (boxer, born 1959) =

Mexican boxer (born 1959)

Personal information
- Full name: Carlos González Ferrer
- Nationality: Mexican
- Born: 14 November 1959 (age 65)

Sport
- Sport: Boxing

Carlos González Ferrer (born 14 November 1959) is a Mexican boxer. He competed in the men's featherweight event at the 1980 Summer Olympics. At the 1980 Summer Olympics, he defeated Nidal Haddad and Ravsalyn Otgonbayar, before losing to Rudi Fink.
