= Farez Halabi =

Syrian boxer (born 1957)

Personal information
- Nationality: Syrian
- Born: 9 June 1957 (age 67)

Sport
- Sport: Boxing

Farez Halabi (Arabic: فارس حلبي; born 9 June 1957) is a Syrian boxer. He competed in the men's light welterweight event at the 1980 Summer Olympics.
