= Abdul-Zahra Jawad =

Iranian boxer

Personal information
- Full name: Abdul-Zahra Jawad Ali
- Nationality: Iraqi
- Born: 7 July 1956 (age 69)
- Height: 160 cm (5 ft 3 in)
- Weight: 57 kg (126 lb)

Sport
- Sport: Boxing

Abdul-Zahra Jawad Ali (Arabic: عبد الزهرة جواد علي, born 7 July 1956) is an Iraqi boxer. He competed in the men's featherweight event at the 1980 Summer Olympics. He also competed in boxing at the 1974 Asian Games in the 51 kg event.

As of 2019, he was the Secretary of the Iraqi Boxing Federation.
