= John Siryakibbe =

Ugandan boxer (born 1962)

Personal information
- Nationality: Ugandan
- Born: 25 December 1962 (age 63)
- Height: 162 cm (5 ft 4 in)
- Weight: 51 kg (112 lb)

Sport
- Sport: Boxing
- Weight class: Bantamweight
Medal record
Men's amateur boxing
Representing Uganda
World Cup
| Bronze medal – third place | 1985 Seoul | Bantamweight |

John Siryakibbe (25 December 1962) is an Ugandan retired boxer, who participated in two Summer Olympics.

Siryakibbe was just 17 years old when he competed at the 1980 Summer Olympics in Moscow, after receiving a bye in the first round of the bantamweight contest, he was up against the Bulgarian Aleksandr Radev, which Siryakibbe won when the referee stopped the contest after just over a minute in round one, in the next round he was against the Frenchman Ali Ben Moghenia, this went all the way with the Ugandan winning on points 5–0, in the quarter finals he lost against Bernardo Piñango after a second-round knockout.

Two years later Siryakibbe was in Brisbane, competing in the 1982 Commonwealth Games, where he finished 5th in the bantamweight division, the following year he won a gold medal at the 1983 African Amateur Boxing Championships which were held in Kampala, Uganda.

Still only twenty-one years old he competed in his second Summer Olympics this time in Los Angeles, under the same weight as four years previous, he beat Manuel Vilchez from Venezuela in the first round by points 3–2, but in the second round contest he lost to Pedro Nolasco from the Dominican Republic on points 0–5.
