= Róbert Gönczi =

Hungarian boxer (1959–2000)

Personal information
- Nationality: Hungarian
- Born: 29 October 1959 Törökszentmiklós, Hungary
- Died: 30 November 2000 (aged 41) Kecskemét, Hungary

Sport
- Sport: Boxing

Róbert Gönczi (29 October 1959 – 30 November 2000) was a Hungarian boxer. He competed in the men's featherweight event at the 1980 Summer Olympics. At the 1980 Summer Olympics, he lost to Titi Cercel of Romania. He died on 30 November 2000 in Kecskemét, Hungary, after he collided with a truck whilst driving on a scooter.
