= Fitzroy Brown =

Guyanese boxer

Personal information
- Nationality: Guyanese
- Born: 3 April 1959 (age 65)

Sport
- Sport: Boxing

Fitzroy Brown (born 3 April 1959) is a Guyanese boxer. He competed in the men's featherweight event at the 1980 Summer Olympics. At the 1980 Summer Olympics, he defeated Abílio Cabral of Angola, before losing to Luis Pizarro of Puerto Rico. Brown also represented Guyana at the 1983 Pan American Games.
