= Sidnei dal Rovere =

Brazilian boxer

Personal information
- Born: 20 March 1959 (age 66); São Paulo, Brazil

Sport
- Sport: Boxing

Sidnei dal Rovere (born 20 March 1959) is a Brazilian boxer. He competed in the men's featherweight event at the 1980 Summer Olympics.
