= Esmail Mohammad =

Afghan Olympic boxer (born 1960)

Esmail Mohammad (born 4 September 1960) is a former Afghanistan boxer, who competed at the 1980 Summer Olympics in the featherweight event.

== 1980 Olympic results ==
Below is the record of Esmail Mohammad, an Afghan featherweight boxer who competed at the 1980 Moscow Olympics:

- Round of 64: bye
- Round of 32: lost to Rudi Fink (East Germany) by first-round knockout
