= Fayez Zaghloul =

Syrian boxer

Personal information
- Nationality: Syrian
- Born: 8 August 1959 (age 65)

Sport
- Sport: Boxing

Fayez Zaghloul (Arabic: فايز زغلول; born 8 August 1959) is a Syrian boxer. He competed in the men's bantamweight event at the 1980 Summer Olympics.
