= Nidal Haddad =

Syrian boxer

Personal information
- Nationality: Syrian
- Born: 5 March 1959 (age 66)

Sport
- Sport: Boxing

Nidal Haddad (Arabic: نضال حداد; born 5 March 1959) is a Syrian boxer. He competed in the men's featherweight event at the 1980 Summer Olympics. In his first fight, he lost to Carlos Gonzalez of Mexico.
