= Ali Ben Maghenia =

French boxer

Personal information
- Nationality: French
- Born: 7 January 1961 (age 64)

Sport
- Sport: Boxing

Ali Ben Maghenia (born 7 January 1961) is a French boxer. He competed in the men's bantamweight event at the 1980 Summer Olympics.
