= Geraldi Issaick =

Tanzanian boxer (born 1956)

Personal information
- Nationality: Tanzanian
- Born: 27 April 1956 (age 68)

Sport
- Sport: Boxing

Geraldi Issaick (born 27 April 1956) is a Tanzanian boxer. He competed in the men's bantamweight event at the 1980 Summer Olympics.
