= Gaston Malam =

Cameroonian sprinter

Personal information
- Nationality: Cameroonian
- Born: 8 July 1952
- Died: 27 August 2021 (aged 69)

Sport
- Sport: Sprinting
- Event: 100 metres

Gaston Malam (8 July 1952 – 27 August 2021) was a Cameroonian sprinter. He competed in the men's 100 metres at the 1972 Summer Olympics.
