= William Lyimo =

Tanzanian boxer (born 1953)

Personal information
- Nationality: Tanzanian
- Born: 27 October 1953 (age 71)

Sport
- Sport: Boxing

William Lyimo (born 27 October 1953) is a Tanzanian boxer. He competed in the men's light welterweight event at the 1980 Summer Olympics. Lyimo also represented Tanzania at the 1974 British Commonwealth Games, losing his first bout to Ayub Kalule of Uganda.
