= John Munduga =

Ugandan boxer (1961–2025)

Personal information
- Nationality: Ugandan
- Born: 15 January 1961 Kampala, Uganda Protectorate
- Died: 13 September 2025 (aged 64) Naguru, Uganda

Sport
- Sport: Boxing

John Munduga (15 January 1961 – 13 September 2025) was a Ugandan boxer. He competed in the men's light welterweight event at the 1980 Summer Olympics. Munduga died on 13 September 2025, at the age of 64.
