= Samson Khachatryan =

Armenian boxer

Personal information
- Nationality: Armenian
- Born: 15 February 1960 (age 65); Vanadzor, Armenia

Sport
- Sport: Boxing

Samson Khachatryan (born 15 February 1960) is an Armenian boxer. He competed in the men's bantamweight event at the 1980 Summer Olympics.
