= Mario Medina (cyclist) =

Venezuelan cyclist

Personal information
- Full name: Mario Medina Varela
- Born: 16 October 1958 (age 67)

Cycling career
- Sport: Cycling

Mario Medina Varela (born 16 October 1958) is a Venezuelan former cyclist. He competed in the individual road race and team time trial events at the 1980 Summer Olympics.
