= Juan Bautista Hernández Pérez =

Cuban boxer (born 1962)

Juan Hernández
Personal information
- Full name: Juan Bautista Hernández Pérez
- Born: 24 December 1962 (age 63) Pilón, Granma, Cuba
Medal record
Men's boxing
Representing Cuba
Olympic Games
Gold medal – first place	1980 Moscow	Bantamweight

Juan Bautista Hernández Pérez (born 24 December 1962) is a retired boxer from Cuba, who won the gold medal in the Bantamweight division (-54 kg) at age seventeen at the 1980 Summer Olympics in Moscow. In the final, he defeated Venezuela's Bernardo Piñango on points (5-0).

== 1980 Olympic results ==
- Round of 64: bye
- Round of 32: Defeated Sándor Farkas (Hungary) by decision, 4-1
- Round of 16: Defeated Ayele Mohammed (Ethiopia) referee stopped the contest in the second round
- Quarterfinal: Defeated Geraldi Issaick (Tanzania) referee stopped the contest in the first round
- Semifinal: Defeated Michael Anthony (Guyana) by decision, 5-0
- Final: Defeated Bernardo Piñango (Venezuela) by decision, 5-0
