= José Angel Molina =

Puerto Rican boxer

Personal information
- Born: October 19, 1958 (age 67) Fajardo, Puerto Rico
Medal record
Men's Boxing
Representing Puerto Rico
Pan American Games
Gold medal – first place	1979 San Juan	Light-Middleweight

José Angel Molina (born October 19, 1958) is a retired boxer from Puerto Rico, who competed in the men's light-middleweight division (– 71 kg) during the late 1970s and early 1980s.

Molina captured the gold medal in the light-middleweight category at the 1979 Pan American Games, defeating USA's James Shuler in the final. The following year, he represented Puerto Rico at the 1980 Summer Olympics in Moscow, alongside two other boxers: Alberto Mercado and Luis Pizarro. Molina had the best individual performance of the three, finishing tied for fifth overall in the light welterweight class.

== 1980 Olympic results ==
Below is the record of Jose Angel Molina, a Puerto Rican light welterweight boxer who competed at the 1980 Moscow Olympics:

- Round of 32: defeated Ebrahim Saide (Ethiopia) by decision, 5-0
- Round of 16: defeated Dietmar Schwarz (East Germany) referee stopped contest
- Quarterfinal: lost to Serik Konakbayev (Soviet Union) by walkover
