= Farouk Janjoun =

Iraqi boxer (1955–2017)

Personal information
- Nationality: Iraqi
- Born: 30 June 1955
- Died: 19 April 2017 (aged 61)

Sport
- Sport: Boxing

Farouk Janjoun (30 June 1955 – 19 April 2017) was an Iraqi boxer. He competed in the men's light welterweight event at the 1980 Summer Olympics.
