= Dejan Marović =

Croatian boxer

Personal information
- Nationality: Montenegro
- Born: 11 June 1960 Peć, Yugoslavia
- Died: 1985 (aged 25)

Sport
- Sport: Boxing

Dejan Marović (11 June 1960 – 1985) was a Montenegrin boxer. He competed in the men's featherweight event at the 1980 Summer Olympics.
