= Juan Arroyo (cyclist) =

Venezuelan cyclist

Personal information
- Born: 19 May 1955 (age 71)

Cycling career
- Sport: Cycling

Juan Arroyo (born 19 May 1955) is a Venezuelan former cyclist. He competed in the individual road race and team time trial events at the 1980 Summer Olympics.
