= Francisco Rueda =

Mexican diver

Personal information
- Nationality: Mexican
- Born: 20 August 1958 (age 67)

Sport
- Sport: Diving

Francisco Rueda (born 20 August 1958) is a Mexican diver. He competed in two events at the 1980 Summer Olympics.
