= Dietmar Schwarz (boxer) =

German boxer

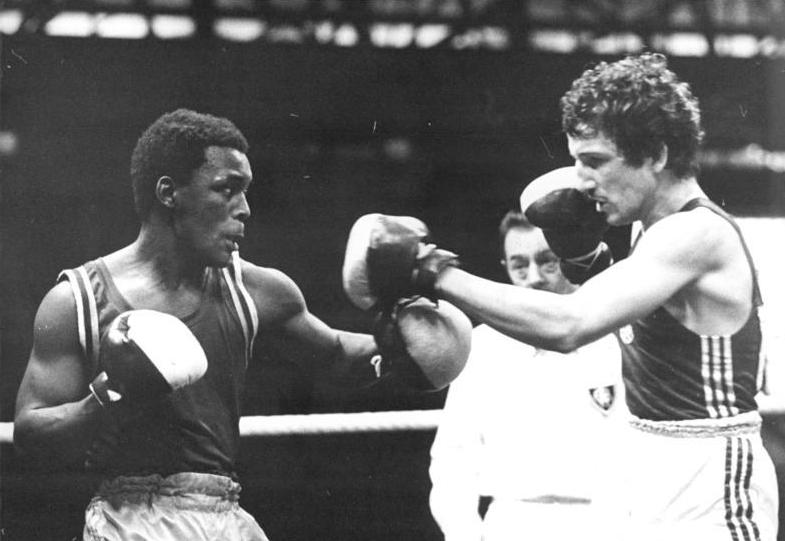
- Dietmar Schwarz (right) fighting Venezuela's José Magallanes

Personal information
- Nationality: German
- Born: 29 January 1960 (age 65); Warin, East Germany

Sport
- Sport: Boxing

Dietmar Schwarz (born 29 January 1960) is a German boxer. He competed in the men's light welterweight event at the 1980 Summer Olympics.
