= Serik Konakbayev =

Kazakhstani boxer (born 1959)

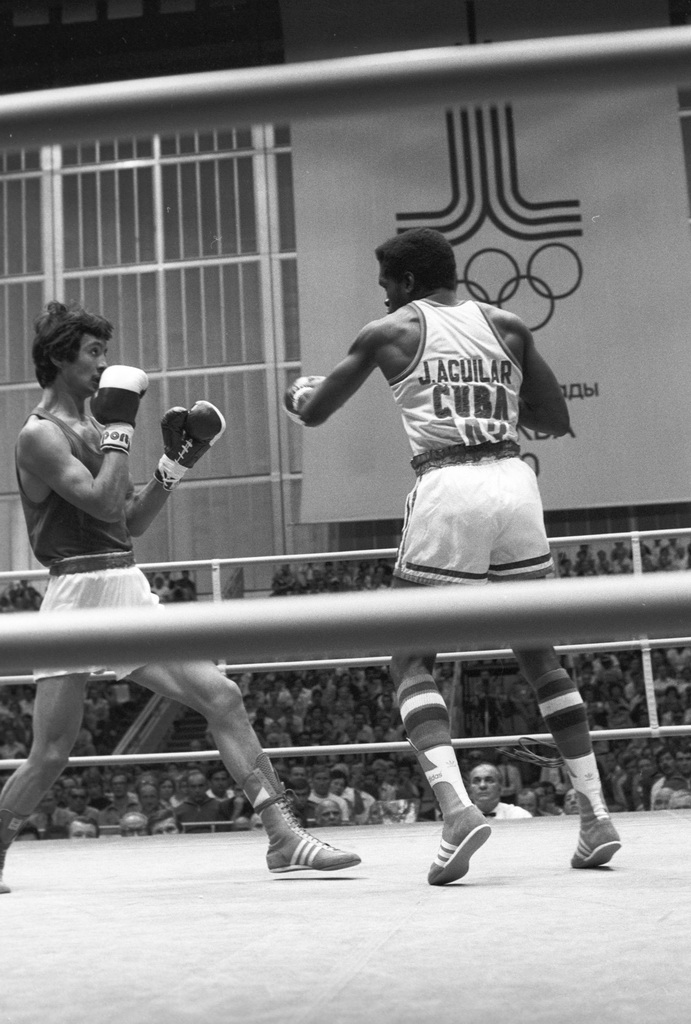
- Konakabayev (left) and Jose Aguilar boxing in 1980

Medal record

Men's amateur boxing

Representing Soviet Union

Olympic Games
Silver medal – second place	1980 Moscow	Light Welterweight

Friendship Games
Bronze medal – third place	1984 Havana	Welterweight

World Championships
Silver medal – second place	1982 Munich	Welterweight

World Cup
Gold medal – first place	1979 New York	Light Welterweight
Gold medal – first place	1981 Montreal	Welterweight

European Championships
Gold medal – first place	1979 Cologne	Light Welterweight
Gold medal – first place	1981 Tampere	Welterweight

Serık Kerımbekūly Qonaqbaev (Note: Often transliterated as Serik Kerimbekovich Konakbayev through a Russified Romanization of Серик Керимбекович Конакбаев.) (Kazakh: Серік Керімбекұлы Қонақбаев; born 25 October 1959) is a Kazakh politician and retired amateur boxer, who represented the USSR at the 1980 Summer Olympics in Moscow, Soviet Union and was later member of the Mäjilis. There he won the silver medal in the light welterweight division (– 63.5 kg), after being defeated in the final by Patrizio Oliva of Italy. Two years later he once again captured the silver medal, this time at the World Championships in Munich, West Germany.

== Olympics ==
=== 1980 Olympic results ===
- Defeated Simion Cuţov (Romania) by unanimous decision, 5–0
- Defeated Imre Bácskai (Hungary) RET 2
- Defeated José Angel Molina (Puerto Rico) by walkover
- Defeated José Aguilar (Cuba) by majority decision, 4–1
- Lost to Patrizio Oliva (Italy) by majority decision, 1–4

=== 1984 Olympics ===
Konakbayev came to attention of Howard Cosell, and after the Soviet Olympic authorities announced the USSR team wouldn't show up at the 1984 Los Angeles Olympics, where Konakbayev had genuine chances to compete for the gold medal at the welterweight event of the Games, Cosell said:

As for the Soviets, well, they are no longer dominant in boxing, they have a couple of good-ones, one of them a man named Konakbayev.

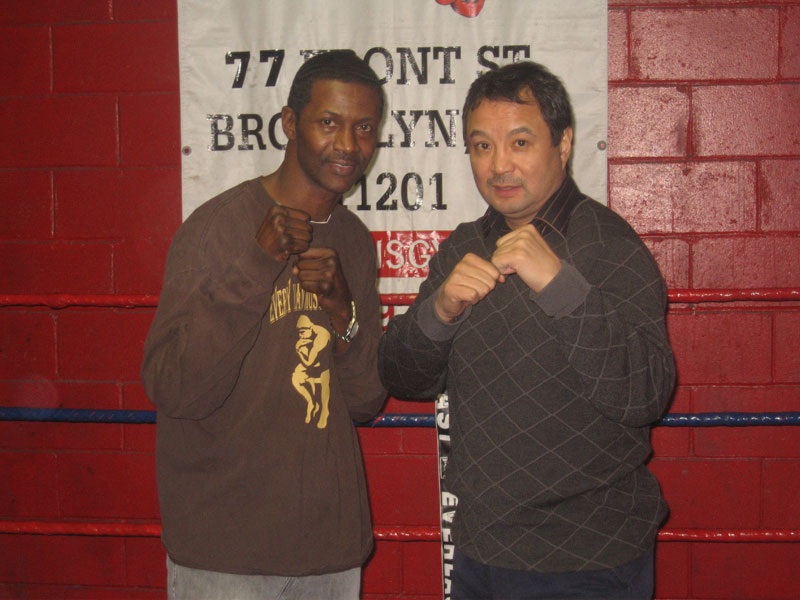
Konakbaev (right) and Mark Breland (left) in 2010
