= Adolfo Horta =

Cuban boxer (1957–2016)

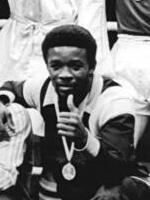
- Adolfo Horta at the awards ceremony of the 1985 Chemistry Cup

Personal information
- Nickname: El hombre del boxeo total
- Nationality: Cuba
- Born: Adolfo Horta Martínez; 3 October 1957 San Lorenzo, Santiago de Cuba Province
- Died: 28 November 2016 (aged 59) Camagüey, Cuba
- Height: 1.74 m (5 ft 9 in)
- Weight: Bantamweight; Featherweight; Lightweight

Boxing career
Medal record
Olympic Games
Silver medal – second place	1980 Moscow	Featherweight
World Amateur Championships
Gold medal – first place	1978 Belgrade	Bantamweight
Gold medal – first place	1982 Munich	Featherweight
Gold medal – first place	1986 Reno	Lightweight
Pan American Games
Gold medal – first place	1979 San Juan	Lightweight
Gold medal – first place	1983 Caracas	Featherweight

Adolfo Horta Martínez (3 October 1957 – 28 November 2016) was a Cuban amateur boxer, who won the silver medal in the Men's Featherweight division (– 57 kg) at age 22 at the 1980 Summer Olympics in Moscow. He was beaten by East Germany's Rudi Fink on points (1-4). Horta won eleven consecutive national championships and three gold medals in the World Amateur Boxing Championships in different weight classes, which appears to have been a unique achievement, but he would never return to the Olympics, as Cuba boycotted the 1984 Summer Olympics.

== 1980 Olympic results ==
- Round of 64: bye
- Round of 32: Odd Bengtsson (Sweden) by decision, 5-0
- Round of 16: Titi Cercel (Romania) by decision, 5-0
- Quarterfinal: Defeated Luis Pizarro (Puerto Rico) by decision, 5-0
- Semifinal: Defeated Krysztof Kosedowski (Poland) by walkover
- Final: Lost to Rudi Fink (East Germany) by decision, 1-4 (was awarded silver medal)
