= Bernardo Piñango =

Venezuelan boxer

Personal information
- Born: Bernardo José Piñango Figuera; 9 February 1960 (age 66) Caracas, Venezuela
- Height: 5 ft 6 1/2 in (169 cm)
- Weight: Bantamweight; Super bantamweight

Boxing career
- Reach: 66 in (168 cm)
- Stance: Orthodox

Boxing record
- Total fights: 32
- Wins: 23
- Win by KO: 15
- Losses: 5
- Draws: 3
- No contests: 1
Medal record
Men's Boxing
Representing Venezuela
Olympics
Silver medal – second place	1980 Moscow	Bantamweight

Bernardo José Piñango Figuera (born February 9, 1960) is a Venezuelan former professional boxer who competed from 1981 to 1990. He is a world champion in two weight classes, having held the WBA and The Ring bantamweight titles from 1986 to 1987 and the WBA super bantamweight title in 1988. As an amateur boxer, he won a silver medal in the bantamweight division (-54 kg) at the 1980 Summer Olympics in Moscow. In the final he lost to Cuba's Juan Hernández on points (0-5).

== Amateur career ==
- Amateur Record: 110-10 (73)
- Silver medalist at the Boxam de Espana (1977)
- Gold medalist at the 34th Central American Championships (1977)
- 1978 Venezuelan Featherweight Champion
- Silver medalist at the 1980 Moscow Olympic Games in the bantamweight class. His results were:
  - Round of 64: bye
  - Round of 32: Defeated Ernesto Alguera (Nicaragua) by decision, 4-1
  - Round of 16: Defeated Veli Koota (Finland) by disqualification, round 2
  - Quarterfinal: Defeated John Siryakibbe (Uganda) knockout in round 2
  - Semifinal: Defeated Dumitru Cipere (Romania) by decision, 3-2
  - Final: Lost to Juan Hernandez (Cuba) by decision, 0-5 (was awarded silver medal)

== Professional career ==
Piñango became a pro in 1981, and won the Lineal and WBA Bantamweight title on June 4, 1986 against Mexican-American boxer Gaby Canizales. He defended the title three times including against Italian boxer Ciro De Leva. which he lost on March 29, 1987. From February 27, 1988 until May 28, 1988 he was the holder of the WBA Super Bantamweight Belt. He boxed his last match on April 7, 1990 in Las Vegas.

== Professional boxing record ==
32 fights	23 wins	5 losses
By knockout	15	1
By decision	8	4
Draws	3	
No contests	1	

No.	Result	Record	Opponent	Type	Round	Date	Location	Notes
32	Loss	23–5–3 (1)	Troy Dorsey	TKO	8 (10)	Apr 7, 1990	Hilton Hotel, Las Vegas, Nevada, U.S.	
31	Win	23–4–3 (1)	Tommy Valoy	KO	6 (?)	Dec 19, 1989	San Juan, Puerto Rico	
30	Loss	22–4–3 (1)	Job Walters	UD	10	Nov 10, 1988	Kingston, Jamaica	
29	Loss	22–3–3 (1)	Juan José Estrada	UD	12	May 28, 1988	Plaza de Toros, Tijuana, Mexico	Lost WBA super bantamweight title
28	Win	22–2–3 (1)	Julio Gervacio	SD	12	Feb 27, 1988	Coliseo Roberto Clemente, San Juan, Puerto Rico	Won WBA super bantamweight title
27	Draw	21–2–3 (1)	Farid Benredjeb	TD	8 (?)	Oct 3, 1987	L'Espace International, Gravelines, France	
26	Win	21–2–2 (1)	Frankie Duarte	UD	15	Feb 3, 1987	Forum, Inglewood, California, U.S.	Retained WBA and The Ring bantamweight titles
25	Win	20–2–2 (1)	Simon Skosana	KO	15 (15)	Nov 22, 1986	Rand Stadium, Johannesburg, South Africa	Retained WBA and The Ring bantamweight titles
24	Win	19–2–2 (1)	Ciro De Leva	TKO	10 (15)	Oct 4, 1986	Pala Ruffini, Torino, Italy	Retained WBA and The Ring bantamweight titles
23	Win	18–2–2 (1)	Gaby Canizales	UD	15	Jun 4, 1986	Meadowlands Arena, East Rutherford, New Jersey, U.S.	Won WBA and The Ring bantamweight titles
22	Win	17–2–2 (1)	Benito Badilla	KO	6 (10)	Mar 1, 1986	Gimnasio Nuevo Panama, Panama City, Panama	
21	Win	16–2–2 (1)	Jose Meneses	TKO	5 (10)	Dec 14, 1985	Gimnasio Nuevo Panama, Panama City, Panama	
20	Win	15–2–2 (1)	Jose Meneses	KO	5 (10)	Jul 19, 1985	Arena Panama Al Brown, Colon City, Panama	
19	Win	14–2–2 (1)	Milton Torres	PTS	10	May 26, 1984	Mets Pavilion, Guaynabo, Puerto Rico	
18	Loss	13–2–2 (1)	Jesus Flores	PTS	10	Mar 12, 1984	Caracas, Valenzuela	
17	Win	13–1–2 (1)	Hector Vasquez	KO	2 (10)	Feb 27, 1984	Caracas, Valenzuela	
16	Win	12–1–2 (1)	Jose Maria Sandoval	KO	1 (?)	Feb 6, 1984	Caracas, Valenzuela	
15	Win	11–1–2 (1)	Raul Gonzalez	PTS	10	Oct 17, 1983	Caracas, Valenzuela	
14	Loss	10–1–2 (1)	Raul Gonzalez	PTS	10	Aug 8, 1983	Caracas, Valenzuela	
13	Win	10–0–2 (1)	Jun Resma	PTS	10	May 2, 1983	Caracas, Valenzuela	
12	Win	9–0–2 (1)	Rene Aroy	TKO	5 (?)	Apr 11, 1983	Catia La Mar, Valenzuela	
11	Win	8–0–2 (1)	Orlando Silva	KO	2 (?)	Mar 7, 1983	Poliedrito de La Rinconada, Caracas, Valenzuela	
10	Win	7–0–2 (1)	Arnel Arrozal	PTS	10	Feb 22, 1983	Valencia, Valenzuela	
9	Win	6–0–2 (1)	Tito Roque	TKO	5 (?)	Nov 8, 1982	Caracas, Valenzuela	
8	Draw	5–0–2 (1)	Antonio Esparragoza	PTS	10	Oct 4, 1982	Caracas, Valenzuela	
7	NC	5–0–1 (1)	Jose Mosqueda	NC	2 (?)	Jul 26, 1982	Cumana, Valenzuela	
6	Win	5–0–1	Jaime Guerrero	TKO	7 (?)	Jul 12, 1982	Porlamar, Valenzuela	
5	Win	4–0–1	William Gonzalez	KO	3 (?)	Aug 26, 1982	Caracas, Valenzuela	
4	Win	3–0–1	Angel Torres	PTS	6	Nov 2, 1981	Caracas, Valenzuela	
3	Win	2–0–1	Nelson Rodriguez	TKO	1 (?)	Oct 12, 1981	Caracas, Valenzuela	
2	Win	1–0–1	Angel Torres	TKO	1 (?)	Aug 31, 1981	Caracas, Valenzuela	
1	Draw	0–0–1	Angel Torres	PTS	6	Aug 1, 1981	El Poliedro, Caracas, Valenzuela	

== Titles in boxing ==
=== Major world titles ===
- WBA bantamweight champion (118 lbs)
- WBA super bantamweight champion (122 lbs)

=== The Ring magazine titles ===
- The Ring bantamweight champion (118 lbs)

== See also ==
- List of world bantamweight boxing champions
- List of world super-bantamweight boxing champions

Sporting positions
World boxing titles
Preceded by Gaby Canizales	WBA bantamweight champion June 4, 1986 - March 29, 1987; Vacated	Vacant Title next held by Takuya Muguruma
Preceded by Gaby Canizales	The Ring bantamweight champion June 4, 1986 - March 29, 1987; Vacated	Vacant Title next held by Shinsuke Yamanaka
Preceded by Julio Gervacio	WBA super bantamweight champion February 27, 1988 - May 28, 1988	Succeeded by Juan José Estrada
