= Ernesto Alguera =

Nicaraguan boxer

Personal information
- Nationality: Nicaraguan
- Born: 4 February 1961 (age 64)

Sport
- Sport: Boxing

Ernesto Alguera (born 4 February 1961) is a Nicaraguan boxer. He competed in the men's bantamweight event at the 1980 Summer Olympics. At the 1980 Summer Olympics, he lost to Bernardo Piñango of Venezuela.
