= Nelson Rodríguez (boxer) =

Venezuelan boxer

Personal information
- Nationality: Venezuelan
- Born: 10 May 1955 (age 69)

Sport
- Sport: Boxing

Nelson Rodríguez (born 10 May 1955) is a Venezuelan boxer. He competed in the men's light welterweight event at the 1980 Summer Olympics.
