= Charm Chiteule =

Zambian boxer (1953–2008)

Personal information
- Nickname: Shuffle
- Nationality: Zambian
- Born: Charm Chiteule; 10 October 1953 Kabwe, Zambia
- Died: 6 May 2008 (aged 54) Kabwe Mine Hospital
- Weight: feather/super featherweight

Boxing career

Boxing record
- Total fights: 40
- Wins: 34 (KO 13)
- Losses: 5 (KO 2)
- Draws: 1

Charm "Shuffle" Chiteule (10 October 1953 – 6 May 2008), born in Kabwe was a Zambian professional feather/super featherweight boxer of the 1970s and 1980s who won the Zambia featherweight title, and Commonwealth featherweight title, and was a challenger for the United States Boxing Association (USBA) super featherweight title against Refugio Rojas, his professional fighting weight varied from 124 lb (56 kg; 8 st 12 lb), i.e. featherweight to 129 3/4 lb (58.9 kg; 9 st 3.8 lb), i.e. super featherweight, he died of malaria in Kabwe Mine Hospital. Charm Chiteule was the President of the Zambia Boxing Federation (ZABF), and was awarded The President’s Insignia for Meritorious Achievement by Zambian President Levy Mwanawasa as part of the Zambian Independence celebrations on 24 October 2007.
