= Veli Koota =

Finnish boxer

Veli Veikko Koota (born September 14, 1957 in Kankaanpää) is a retired male boxer from Finland, who represented his native country at the 1980 Summer Olympics in Moscow, Soviet Union. There he lost in the third round of the men's bantamweight (– 54 kg) division to Venezuela's eventual silver medalist Bernardo Piñango.
