= Nicolas Owona =

Cameroonian cyclist

Personal information
- Full name: Robert Nicolas Owona
- Born: 14 February 1952 (age 74)

Cycling career
- Sport: Cycling

Robert Nicolas Owona (born 14 February 1952) is a Cameroonian former cyclist. He competed at the 1972, 1976 and 1980 Summer Olympics.
