= Rudi Fink =

East German boxer (born 1958)

Personal information
- Born: 6 June 1958 (age 68) Cottbus, East Germany
- Height: 168 cm (5 ft 6 in)

Sport
- Sport: Boxing
- Club: ASK Vorwärts Frankfurt
- Coached by: Manfred Wolke
Medal record
Representing East Germany
Olympic Games
| Gold medal – first place | 1980 Moscow | Featherweight |

Rudi Fink (born 6 June 1958) is a retired boxer, who won the gold medal in the featherweight division (−57 kg) for East Germany at the 1980 Summer Olympics.

== Biography ==
Fink took up boxing at the age of nine. He won the national title in 1977, 1979 and 1980, placing second in 1978. In 1980 he won the Olympic gold medal and was awarded the Patriotic Order of Merit in silver. After the 1981 European Amateur Boxing Championships, he retired from boxing with a record of 155 wins, 5 draws and 10 losses. He then worked as a car mechanic, educator, and boxing coach, briefly heading the national boxing team in 1993. Between 2003 and 2008 he worked as an assistant to his former coach Manfred Wolke. Fink is married and has one child.

== 1980 Olympic results ==
Below are the results of Rudi Fink, an East German featherweight boxer who competed at the 1980 Moscow Olympics:

- Round of 64: Defeated Hannu Kaislama (Finland) on points, 5–0
- Round of 32: Defeated Esmail Mohammad (Afghanistan) KO 1
- Round of 16: Defeated Carlos Gonzalez (Mexico) KO 2
- Quarterfinal: Defeated Winfred Kabunda (Zambia) on points, 4–1
- Semifinal: Defeated Viktor Rybakov (Soviet Union) on points, 4–1
- Final: Defeated Adolfo Horta (Cuba) on points, 4–1 (won gold medal)
