= Ravsalyn Otgonbayar =

Mongolian boxer (born 1955)

Personal information
- Nationality: Mongolia
- Born: Равсалын Отгонбаяр; 31 May 1955 Mongolia
- Died: 28 November 1993 (aged 38)
- Height: 169 cm (5 ft 7 in)

Sport
- Country: Mongolia
- Sport: Boxing
- Weight class: 57 kg

Achievements and titles
- World finals: (silver) (1982)
- Regional finals: (gold) (1980) (bronze) (1978)
Medal record
Men's amateur boxing
Representing Mongolia
World Championships
Silver medal – second place	1982 Munich	Featherweight
Asian Games
Bronze medal – third place	1978 Bangkok	Featherweight
Asian Championships
Gold medal – first place	1980 Bombay	Featherweight

Ravsalyn Otgonbayar (Mongolian: Равсалын Отгонбаяр; born 31 May 1955 – 28 November 1993) was a Mongolian boxer. He competed at the 1976 Summer Olympics and the 1980 Summer Olympics. At the 1980 Summer Olympics, he lost to Carlos Gonzalez of Mexico.
