= Joseph Ahanda =

Cameroonian boxer (born 1960)

Personal information
- Nationality: Cameroonian
- Born: 3 July 1960 (age 64)
- Height: 1.60 m (5 ft 3 in)
- Weight: 54 kg (119 lb)

Sport
- Sport: Boxing

Joseph Ahanda (born 3 July 1960) is a Cameroonian boxer. He competed in the 1980 Summer Olympics.
