= Lucky Mutale =

Zambian boxer (born 1955)

Lucky Mutale (born 17 February 1955) is a retired Zambian boxer. The 5 ft 3.5 in (162 cm) 106 lb (48 kg) Mutale competed in the Men's Bantamweight category for Zambia at the 1980 Summer Olympics. He won a gold medal at the All-Africa Games in 1978 in the Men's Flyweight division.

== 1980 Olympic results ==
Below are the results of Lucky Mutale, a flyweight boxer from Zambia who competed at the 1980 Moscow Olympics:

- Round of 64: defeated Moussa Sangare (Mali) on points, 5-0
- Round of 32: lost to Dumitru Cipere (Romania) on points, 0-5
