= Joseph Evouna =

Cameroonian cyclist

Personal information
- Born: 23 October 1952 (age 73)

Cycling career
- Sport: Cycling

Joseph Evouna (born 23 October 1952) is a Cameroonian former cyclist. He competed at the 1972 Summer Olympics and 1980 Summer Olympics.
