= Joseph Kono =

Cameroonian cyclist (born 1950)

Joe Kono
Personal information
- Born: 29 December 1960 (age 65)

Cycling career
- Sport: Cycling

Joseph Kono (born 29 December 1950) is a Cameroonian former cyclist. He competed at the 1972, 1976, 1980 and 1984 Summer Olympics.
