= Alberto Mercado =

Puerto Rican boxer (born 1961)

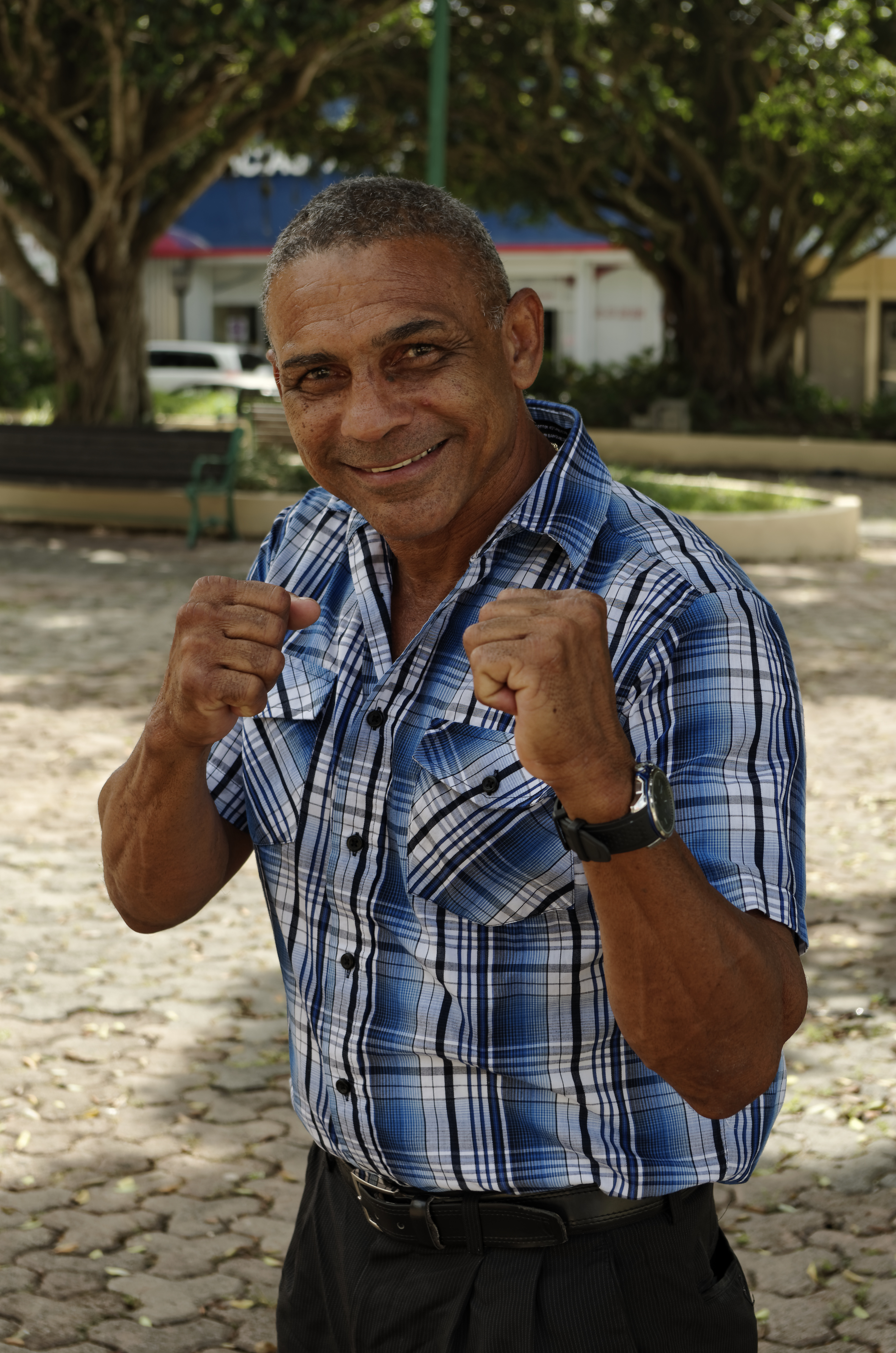

Personal information
- Full name: Alberto Mercado
- Nationality: Puerto Rico
- Born: January 2, 1961 (age 65) Cayey, Puerto Rico
- Height: 166 cm (5 ft 5 in)
- Weight: 51 kg (112 lb)

Sport
- Sport: Boxing
- Weight class: Flyweight
Medal record
Pan American Games
Gold medal – first place	1979 San Juan	Flyweight

Alberto Mercado Monserrate (born January 2, 1961) is a former Jr. Featherweight boxer who was on the verge of fighting for a world title at least twice in his career.

== Amateur boxing career ==
Mercado started boxing as an amateur at the age of 12, immediately winning a nationwide competition known as the "Olimpiadas Jíbaras de la Vivienda" ("Housing Complex Townspeoples' Olympics"). This motivated him to keep boxing as an amateur and hoping to win a world title in the future.

In 1978, Mercado represented Puerto Rico at the 1978 Central American and Caribbean Games held at Colombia. He won gold at these games and participated in a world cup tournament. Hoping to become the first Puerto Rican ever to win a gold medal at an Olympic Games, Mercado moved to Cuba periodically; there he trained hard towards that goal.

Around that era, Mercado befriended and worked alongside one of Jose Celso Barbosa's children; he criticized the Puerto Rican government which was led by Carlos Romero Barcelo of the Statehood supporting New Progressive Party and was fired from his job and taken by Puerto Rico Olympic Committee President German Rieckehoff Sampayo to live in Mexico for a while.

Mercado was one of only three American citizens to participate in the 1980 Olympics celebrated in Moscow, Soviet Union, bearing the flag of and competing in boxing for Puerto Rico after having won the gold medal at the 1979 Pan American Games. The other two were also representants from Puerto Rico and boxers: Luis Pizarro and José Angel Molina.

During a 2021 Interview with Cuban-Puerto Rican journalist Jesus "Chu" Garcia on YouTube, Mercado remembered how he and his fellow Puerto Rican boxers Pizarro and Molina were the first delegates of any kind to arrive in Russia and how he flew on Aeroflot from Cuba to Russia to get there.

== 1980 Olympic results ==
Below is the record of Alberto Mercado, a Puerto Rican boxer who competed in the flyweight division at the 1980 Moscow Olympics:

- Round of 32: bye
- Round of 16: lost to Gilberto Roman (Mexico) referee stopped contest

== Professional career ==
In the professional ranks Mercado had a winning record, but also had some bad luck. He lost to Refugio Rojas in a USBA Featherweight title try on points by split decision, and on a fight to decide the IBF's #1 challenger, he lost by a knockout in 7 rounds to eventual world champion Antonio Rivera, after leading the fight on all scorecards at the end of round 6.

Mercado trained at the famous Bairoa gym at Caguas and he was friends with gym-mate Juan Carazo.

== Later life ==
He had a professional record of 31 wins, 14 losses and 1 draw (tie), with 27 wins by knockout.

Mercado currently works at the gym of the University of Puerto Rico at Cayey. There were plans to build a small museum in Cayey dedicated to him; that museum, named "Casa Museo Alberto Mercado", was opened in 2018. Alberto has three kids, who are Wilnelia Mercado, Gloribel Mercado and Luis Mercado. (in Spanish)

=== Health problems ===
Mercado discussed in 2021 that he suffers epilepsy, sudden memory loss and balance problems as a consequence of his boxing career, but takes medication to control these health problems.

== See also ==
- Juan Carazo
- List of Puerto Ricans
- Miguel Angel Cotto
- Sports in Puerto Rico
- Boxing in Puerto Rico
