= Winfred Kabunda =

Zambian boxer

Personal information
- Nationality: Zambian

Sport
- Sport: Boxing
Medal record
Representing Zambia
Commonwealth Games
Bronze medal – third place	1982 Brisbane	Featherweight

Winfred Kabunda is a Zambian boxer. He competed in the men's featherweight event at the 1980 Summer Olympics.
