= Imre Bacskai (boxer, born 1961) =

Hungarian boxer

Personal information
- Nationality: Hungarian
- Born: 21 June 1961 (age 65) Budapest, Hungary

Sport
- Sport: Boxing
Medal record
Men's amateur boxing
Representing Hungary
World Cup
Silver medal – second place	1983 Rome	Light welterweight

Imre Bacskai (born 21 June 1961) is a Hungarian boxer. He competed in the men's light welterweight event at the 1980 Summer Olympics and in the men's welterweight event at the 1988 Summer Olympics.
