= Dumitru Cipere =

Romanian boxer

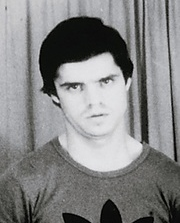

Personal information
- Born: 22 October 1957 (age 68) Drobeta-Turnu Severin, Romania
- Height: 165 cm (5 ft 5 in)

Sport
- Sport: Boxing
- Coached by: Constantin Draghici
Medal record
Representing Romania
Romania National Amateur Boxing Championships
Silver medal – second place	1977 Bucharest	-51 kg
Gold medal – first place	1980 Bucharest	-54 kg
Gold medal – first place	1981 Bucharest	-54 kg
Gold medal – first place	1982 Bucharest	-54 kg
Olympic Games
Bronze medal – third place	1980 Moscow	-54 kg
European Amateur Boxing Championships
Bronze medal – third place	1981 Tampere	-54 kg

Dumitru Cipere (born 22 October 1957) is a retired bantamweight boxer from Romania who won bronze medals at the 1980 Olympics and 1981 European Championships. Cipere also won three national senior titles. He took up boxing aged 12 at CSM Severin and after retiring from competitions he worked as a coach there.

== 1980 Olympic results ==
Below is the record of Dumitru Cipere, a Romanian bantamweight boxer who competed at the 1980 Moscow Olympics:

- Round of 64: defeated Mario Behrendt (East Germany) by decision, 5–0
- Round of 32: defeated Lucky Mutale (Zambia) by decision, 5–0
- Round of 16: defeated Ryszard Czerwinski (Poland) by decision, 5–0
- Quarterfinal: defeated Samson Khachatrian (Soviet union) by decision, 4–1
- Semifinal: lost to Bernardo Pinango (Venezuela) by decision, 2–3 (was awarded bronze medal)
