= Luis Pizarro =

Puerto Rican boxer (born 1962)

Personal information
- Born: October 26, 1962 (age 63) Río Grande, Puerto Rico
Medal record
Men's Boxing
Representing Puerto Rico
Pan American Games
Silver medal – second place	1979 San Juan	Bantamweight

Luis Pizarro (born October 26, 1962) in Río Grande, Puerto Rico is a retired boxer from Puerto Rico, who competed in the men's bantamweight (– 54 kg) and featherweight division (- 57 kg) during the late 1970s and early 1980s.

Pizarro captured the silver medal in the bantamweight category at the 1979 Pan American Games. The following year, he represented his native country at the 1980 Summer Olympics in Moscow, alongside two other boxers: Alberto Mercado and José Angel Molina.

== 1980 Olympic results ==
Below is the record of Luis Pizarro, a Puerto Rican featherweight boxer who competed at the 1980 Moscow Olympics:

- Round of 64: bye
- Round of 32: defeated Jean-Pierre Mbereke-Baban (Cameroon) referee stopped contest
- Round of 16: defeated Fitzroy Brown (Guyana) by decision, 5-0
- Quarterfinal: lost to Adolfo Horta (Cuba) by decision, 0-5
