= Bulgaria at the 1980 Summer Olympics =

- IOC code: BUL
- NOC: Bulgarian Olympic Committee

in Moscow
- Competitors: 271 (183 men and 88 women) in 20 sports
- Flag bearer: Aleksandar Tomov
- Medals Ranked 3rd: Gold 8 Silver 16 Bronze 17 Total 41

Summer Olympics appearances (overview)
- 1896; 1900–1920; 1924; 1928; 1932; 1936; 1948; 1952; 1956; 1960; 1964; 1968; 1972; 1976; 1980; 1984; 1988; 1992; 1996; 2000; 2004; 2008; 2012; 2016; 2020; 2024

Bulgaria competed at the 1980 Summer Olympics in Moscow, USSR. 271 competitors, 183 men and 88 women, took part in 151 events in 20 sports.

== Medalists ==
Medal	Name	Sport	Event	Date
Gold	Yanko Rusev	Weightlifting	Men's 67.5 kg	23 July
Gold	Georgi Raikov	Wrestling	Men's Greco-Roman 100 kg	23 July
Gold	Asen Zlatev	Weightlifting	Men's 75 kg	24 July
Gold	Stojan Deltshev	Gymnastics	Men's horizontal bar	25 July
Gold	Valentin Raychev	Wrestling	Men's freestyle 74 kg	30 July
Gold	Ismail Abilov	Wrestling	Men's freestyle 82 kg	31 July
Gold	Petar Lesov	Boxing	Men's flyweight	2 August
Gold	Lyubomir Lyubenov	Canoeing	Men's C-1 1000 metres	2 August
Silver	Stefan Dimitrov	Weightlifting	Men's 60 kg	22 July
Silver	Aleksandar Tomov	Wrestling	Men's Greco-Roman +100 kg	24 July
Silver	Nadya Filipova, Ginka Gyurova, Mariyka Modeva, Rita Todorova and Iskra Velinova	Rowing	Women's coxed four	26 July
Silver	Blagoi Blagoev	Weightlifting	Men's 82.5 kg	26 July
Silver	Dimitar Zapryanov	Judo	Men's +95kg	July 27
Silver	Rumen Aleksandrov	Weightlifting	Men's 90 kg	27 July
Silver	Valentin Hristov	Weightlifting	Men's 110 kg	29 July
Silver	Mikho Dukov	Wrestling	Men's freestyle 62 kg	29 July
Silver	Krasimira Bogdanova, Diana Dilova-Braynova, Vanya Dermendzhieva, Silviya Germanova, Nadka Golcheva, Petkana Makayeeva, Penka Metodieva, Angelina Mikhaylova, Snezhana Mikhaylova, Kostadinka Radkova, Evladiya Slavcheva, and Penka Stoyanova	Basketball	Women's tournament	30 July
Silver	Slavcho Chervenkov	Wrestling	Men's freestyle 100 kg	30 July
Silver	Georgi Gadshev, Svetoslav Ivanov, and Petar Mandazhiev	Equestrian	Team dressage	31 July
Silver	Ivan Yankov	Wrestling	Men's freestyle 68 kg	31 July
Silver	Mariya Petkova	Athletics	Women's discus throw	1 August
Silver	Lyubomir Lyubenov	Canoeing	Men's C-1 500 metres	1 August
Silver	Vanja Gesheva-Tsvetkova	Canoeing	Women's K-1 500 metres	1 August
Silver	Yordan Angelov, Dimitar Dimitrov, Stefan Dimitrov, Stoyan Gunchev, Khristo Iliev, Petko Petkov, Kaspar Simeonov, Khristo Stoyanov, Mitko Todorov, Tsano Tsanov, Emil Valchev, and Dimitar Zlatanov	Volleyball	Men's tournament	1 August
Bronze	Lyubcho Dyakov	Shooting	Mixed 50 metre pistol	20 July
Bronze	Petar Zapryanov	Shooting	Mixed 50 metre rifle prone	21 July
Bronze	Mladen Mladenov	Wrestling	Men's Greco-Roman 52 kg	23 July
Bronze	Mincho Pashov	Weightlifting	Men's 67.5 kg	23 July
Bronze	Stojan Deltshev	Gymnastics	Men's artistic individual all-around	24 July
Bronze	Pavel Pavlov	Wrestling	Men's Greco-Roman 82 kg	24 July
Bronze	Nedelcho Kolev	Weightlifting	Men's 75 kg	24 July
Bronze	Petar Petrov	Athletics	Men's 100 meters	25 July
Bronze	Siyka Kelbecheva and Stoyanka Kurbatova-Gruicheva	Rowing	Women's coxless pair	26 July
Bronze	Ani Bakova, Rumeliana Boncheva, Dolores Nakova, and Mariana Serbezova	Rowing	Women's quadruple sculls	26 July
Bronze	Bogdan Dobrev, Mincho Nikolov, Lyubomir Petrov, and Ivo Rusev	Rowing	Men's quadruple sculls	27 July
Bronze	Verka Borisova-Stoyanova, Tsvetana Bozhurina, Rositsa Dimitrova, Tanya Dimitrova-Todorova, Maya Georgieva-Stoeva, Tanya Gogova, Valentina Ilieva-Kharalampieva, Rumyana Kaisheva, Anka Kristolova-Uzunova, and Silva Petrunova	Volleyball	Women's tournament	29 July
Bronze	Nermedin Selimov	Wrestling	Men's freestyle 52 kg	30 July
Bronze	Ivailo Khristov	Boxing	Men's light flyweight	31 July
Bronze	Iliyan Nedkov	Judo	Men's 65kg	31 July
Bronze	Borislav Ananiev and Nikolay Ilkov	Canoeing	Men's C-2 500 metres	1 August
Bronze	Borislav Borisov, Lazar Khristov, Ivan Manev, and Bozhidar Milenkov	Canoeing	Men's K-4 1000 metres	2 August

== Archery ==
In its first appearance in Olympic archery, Bulgaria entered one man and one woman.

Men

Athlete	Event	Round 1		Round 2		Total score	
Athlete	Event	Score	Seed	Score	Seed	Score	Seed
Petyo Kishev	Individual	1117	30	1116	29	2233	30

Women

Athlete	Event	Round 1		Round 2		Total score	
Athlete	Event	Score	Seed	Score	Seed	Score	Seed
Tzvetanka Stoytcheva	Individual	1089	23	1055	29	2144	27

== Athletics ==
Men
Track & road events

Athlete	Event	Heat		Quarterfinal		Semifinal		Final	
Athlete	Event	Result	Rank	Result	Rank	Result	Rank	Result	Rank
Yanko Bratanov	400 m hurdles	50.56	5 q	—N/a		50.17	5 q	56.35	8
Vladimir Ivanov	200 m	21.28	4 q	20.96	5	Did not advance			
Ivaylo Karanyotov	100 m	10.66	4	Did not advance					
Binko Kolev	800 m	1:48.7	3 Q	1:47.3	3	Did not advance			
Plamen Krastev	110 m hurdles	13.95	3 Q	—N/a		13.99	6	Did not advance	
Stanimir Nenov	3000 m steeplechase	8:50.2	12	—N/a		Did not advance			
Pavel Pavlov	200 m	21.78	3 Q	21.35	8	Did not advance			
Petar Petrov	100 m	10.32	1 Q	10.13	2 Q	10.39	1 Q	10.39	Bronze medal
Petar Petrov	200 m	21.78	3 Q	21.89	8	Did not advance			
Pavel Pavlov; Vladimir Ivanov; Ivaylo Karanyotov; Petar Petrov	4 × 100 m relay	39.25	3 Q	—N/a				38.99	6

Field events

Athlete	Event	Qualification		Final	
Athlete	Event	Distance	Position	Distance	Position
Atanas Chochev	Triple jump	16.42	12 q	16.56	6
Emanuil Dyulgerov	Hammer throw	70.60	11 q	74.04	6
Nikola Khristov	Shot put	19.01	13	Did not advance	
Atanas Mladenov	High jump	2.10	24	Did not advance	
Valcho Stoev	Shot put	NM		Did not advance	
Stefan Stoykov	Javelin throw	78.74	12 q	79.04	11
Atanas Tarev	Pole vault	5.25	13	Did not advance	
Ivan Tuparov	Long jump	7.46	22	Did not advance	
Ivo Yanchev	Pole vault	NM		Did not advance	
Yordan Yanev	Long jump	7.84	10 q	8.02	8
Velko Velev	Discus throw	61.30	10 q	63.04	8
Emil Vladimirov	Discus throw	62.50	7 Q	63.18	7

Combined events – Decathlon

Athlete	Event	100 m	LJ	SP	HJ	400 m	100H	DT	PV	JT	1500 m	Final	Rank
Atanas Andonov	Result	11.38	6.86	15.59	2.00	50.36	14.83	47.62	4.70	53.34	4:29.2	7927	7
Atanas Andonov	Points											7927	7
Razvigor Yankov	Result	11.26	6.61	16.28	1.85	50.37	15.69	48.02	4.60	58.12	4:51.2	7624	14
Razvigor Yankov	Points											7624	14

Women
Track & road events

Athlete	Event	Heat		Quarterfinal		Semifinal		Final	
Athlete	Event	Result	Rank	Result	Rank	Result	Rank	Result	Rank
Malena Andonova	400 m	53.30	6	Did not advance					
Svobodka Damyanova	400 m	52.23	4	Did not advance					
Yordanka Donkova	100 m hurdles	13.24	6 Q	—N/a		13.39	6	Did not advance	
Liliyana Panayotova-Ivanova	200 m	23.17	2 Q	23.29	3 Q	23.07	6	Did not advance	
Galina Penkova	200 m	23.35	3 Q	23.37	5 Q	23.27	8	Did not advance	
Totka Petrova	800 m	2:00.6	3 Q	—N/a		2:00.0	6	Did not advance	
Totka Petrova	1500 m	4:13.8	8	Did not advance					
Sofka Popova	100 m	11.35	1 Q	11.42	4 Q	11.40	7	Did not advance	
Mariya Shishkova	100 m	11.57	3 Q	11.47	5 Q	11.65	7	Did not advance	
Nikolina Shtereva	800 m	1:58.9	3 Q	—N/a		1:58.9	4 Q	1:58.8	7
Nikolina Shtereva	1500 m	4:08.3	7	Did not advance					
Rositsa Stamenova	400 m	52.71	3 Q	—N/a		52.96	8	Did not advance	
Vesela Yatsinska	800 m	1:59.9	3 Q	—N/a		1:59.9	5	Did not advance	
Vesela Yatsinska	1500 m	4:04.7	6	Did not advance					
Daniela Valkova	100 m hurdles	13.66	5 Q	—N/a		13.79	6	Did not advance	
Sofka Popova; Liliyana Panayotova-Ivanova; Mariya Shishkova; Galina Penkova	4 × 100 m relay	—N/a						42.67	4
Svobodka Damyanova; Rositsa Stamenova; Malena Andonova; Bonka Dimova	4 × 400 m relay	3:28.7	2 Q	—N/a				DNF	

Field events

Athlete	Event	Qualification		Final	
Athlete	Event	Distance	Position	Distance	Position
Yordanka Blagoeva	High jump	1.80	16	Did not advance	
Svetla Bozhkova	Discus throw	60.84	5 Q	63.14	8
Lidiya Gusheva	Long jump	6.56	5 Q	6.24	12
Ekaterina Nedeva	Long jump	5.83	17	Did not advance	
Mariya Petkova	Discus throw	65.02	2 Q	67.90	Silver medal
Ivanka Petrova	Shot put	—N/a		18.34	11
Tsvetana Ralinska	Javelin throw	DNS		Did not advance	
Elena Stoyanova	Shot put	—N/a		20.22	6
Antoaneta Todorova	Javelin throw	60.56	5 Q	60.66	10
Ivanka Vancheva	Javelin throw	61.16	4 Q	65.38	5
Verzhinia Veselinova	Shot put	—N/a		20.72	5

Combined events – pentathlon

Athlete	Event	100H	LJ	SP	HJ	1500 m	Final	Rank
Valentina Dimitrova	Result	14.39	5.91	15.65	1.74	2:15.50	4458	7
Valentina Dimitrova	Points						4458	7
Emilia Kunova	Result	13.72	6.10	11.98	1.74	2:11.10	4431	8
Emilia Kunova	Points						4431	8

== Basketball ==
=== Women's tournament ===
The women's tournament was decided in a round robin group with all six teams. The first two places competed for the gold medal, while the third and fourth places for the bronze. The remaining teams retain their group ranks for the final standings. The host nation finished the group phase undefeated and won the gold against Bulgaria. Yugoslavia would go on to win the bronze medal against Hungary.

Competed for the gold medal
Competed for the bronze medal

Team	W	L	PF	PA	PD	Pts
Soviet Union	5	0	553	316	+237	10
Bulgaria	4	1	440	405	+35	9
Yugoslavia	3	2	356	364	−8	8
Hungary	2	3	344	407	−63	7
Cuba	1	4	346	403	−57	6
Italy	0	5	308	452	−144	5

July 20

Italy	65–102	Bulgaria

Olympiiski, Moscow

July 22

Bulgaria	83–122	Soviet Union

Olympiiski, Moscow

July 24

Bulgaria	84–64	Cuba

Olympiiski, Moscow

July 27

Hungary	75–90	Bulgaria

Olympiiski, Moscow

July 28

Yugoslavia	79–81	Bulgaria

Olympiiski, Moscow

==== Gold-medal match ====
July 30

Soviet Union	104–73	Bulgaria

Olympiiski, Moscow

== Boxing ==
Men's Light Flyweight (– 48 kg)

- Ismail Mustafov → Bronze Medal
  - First Round — Bye
  - Second Round – defeated Gerard Hawkins (Ireland) on points (5-0)
  - Quarter-finals – defeated Ahmed Siad (Algeria) on points (5-0)
  - Semi-finals – lost to Hipolito Ramos (Cuba) on points (1-4)

Men's flyweight (– 51 kg)

- Petar Lesov → Gold Medal
  - First Round – defeated Onofre Ramirez (Nicaragua) on points (5-0)
  - Second Round – defeated Hassen Sherif (Ethiopia) on points (5-0)
  - Quarter-finals – defeated Roman Gilberto (Mexico) on points (4-1)
  - Semi-finals – defeated Hugh Russell (Ireland) on points (5-0)
  - Final – defeated Viktor Miroshnichenko (Soviet Union) after referee stopped contest in 2nd round

Men's Bantamweight (– 54 kg)

- Aleksandr Radev
  - First Round — Bye
  - Second Round – lost to John Siryakibbe (Uganda) after referee stopped contest in first round

Men's featherweight (– 57 kg)

- Tsacho Andreikovski
  - First Round — Bye
  - Second Round – defeated William Azanor (Nigeria) after knock-out in first round
  - Third Round – defeated Barthelémy Adoukonu (Benin) after knock-out in second round
  - Quarter-finals – lost to Viktor Rybakov (Soviet Union) on points (1-4)

Men's lightweight (– 60 kg)

- Yordan Lesov
  - First Round – defeated Patrice Martin (Benin) after knock-out in first round
  - Second Round – defeated Tibor Dezamits (Hungary) on points (4-1)
  - Quarter-finals – lost to Viktor Demyanenko (Soviet Union) on points (0-5)

Men's light-welterweight (– 63.5 kg)

- Margarit Anastasov
  - First Round – lost to Ace Rusevski (Yugoslavia) on points (1-4)

Men's heavyweight (+ 81 kg)

- Petr Stoimenov
  - First Round – defeated Naasan Ajjoub (Syria) after referee stopped contest in second round
  - Quarter-finals – lost to Jürgen Fanghänel (East Germany) after referee stopped contest in second round

== Canoeing ==
=== Sprint ===
Men

Athlete	Event	Heats		Repechages		Semifinals		Final	
Athlete	Event	Time	Rank	Time	Rank	Time	Rank	Time	Rank
Lyubomir Lyubenov	C-1 500 m	1:54.31	1 Q	—N/a		BYE		1:53.49	Silver medal
Lyubomir Lyubenov	C-1 1000 m	4:06.82	2 Q	—N/a		BYE		4:12.38	Gold medal
Borislav Ananiev; Nikolai Ilkov	C-2 500 m	1:45.00	4 Q	—N/a		1:47.42	1 Q	1:44.83	Bronze medal
Raycho Karmadzhiev; Kaman Kutsev	C-2 1000 m	3:45.56	3 Q	—N/a		BYE		3:53.89	7
Ivan Manev	K-1 500 m	DNS		Did not advance					
Ivan Manev	K-1 1000 m	DNS		Did not advance					
Slavcho Mangarakov; Boiko Savov	K-2 500 m	DNS		Did not advance					
Lazar Khristov; Georgi Donchev	K-2 1000 m	DNS		Did not advance					
Borislav Borisov; Bozhidar Milenkov; Lazar Khristov; Ivan Manev	K-4 1000 m	3:07.19	5 Q	—N/a		3:12.00	3 Q	3:15.46	Bronze medal

Women

Athlete	Event	Heats		Repechages		Semifinals		Final	
Athlete	Event	Time	Rank	Time	Rank	Time	Rank	Time	Rank
Vanja Gesheva	K-1 500 m	1:58.40	2 Q	—N/a		BYE		1:59.48	Silver medal
Mariya Mincheva; Natasha Petrova	K-2 500 m	1:50.51	5 Q	—N/a		1:51.66	1 Q	1:53.12	9

== Cycling ==
Six cyclists represented Bulgaria in 1980.

=== Road ===
Athlete	Event	Time	Rank
Borislav Asenov	Men's road race	DNF	
Yordan Penchev	Men's road race	DNF	
Andon Petrov	Men's road race	DNF	
Nencho Staykov	Men's road race	DNF	
Borislav Asenov; Venelin Khubenov; Yordan Penchev; Nencho Staykov	Team time trial	2:05:55.2	6

=== Track ===
Time trial

Athlete	Event	Time	Rank
Stoyan Petrov	1 km time trial	1:08.682	12

== Diving ==
Men

Athlete	Event	Preliminaries		Final	
Athlete	Event	Points	Rank	Points	Rank
Petr Georgiev	3 m springboard	504.33	13	Did not advance	
Petr Georgiev	10 m platform	391.32	18	Did not advance	
Radoslav Radev	10 m platform	406.89	17	Did not advance	

== Equestrian ==
=== Dressage ===
Athlete	Horse	Event	Qualification		Final		Overall	
Athlete	Horse	Event	Score	Rank	Score	Rank	Score	Rank
Georgi Gadzhev	Vnimatelen	Individual	1146	9 Q	881	7	881	7
Svetoslav Ivanov	Aleko	Individual	1190	8 Q	850	8	850	8
Petar Mandajiev	Schibor	Individual	1244	7 Q	846	9	846	9
Georgi Gadzhev; Svetoslav Ivanov; Petar Mandajiev	See above	Team	3580	2	—N/a		3580	Silver medal

=== Eventing ===
Athlete	Horse	Event	Dressage		Cross-country			Jumping			Total	
Athlete	Horse	Event	Dressage		Cross-country			Final			Total	
Athlete	Horse	Event	Penalties	Rank	Penalties	Total	Rank	Penalties	Total	Rank	Penalties	Rank
Trifon Datsinski	Mentor-2	Individual	65.80	20	DNF			DNS			DNF	AC
Tzvetan Dontchev	Medisson	Individual	66.40	21	114.40	180.80	5	5.00	185.80	5	185.80	5
Dimo Khristov	Bogez	Individual	68.80	23	265.60	334.40	13	DNS			DNF	AC
Dzhenko Sabev	Normativ	Individual	59.40	12	DNF			DNS			DNF	AC
Tzvetan Dontchev; Dimo Khristov; Dzhenko Sabev; Trifon Datsinski	See above	Team	191.60	5	DNF		AC	DNF		AC	DNF	

=== Show jumping ===
Athlete	Horse	Event	Qualification		Final			
Athlete	Horse	Event	Penalties	Rank	Penalties	Rank	Penalties	Rank
Dimitar Ghenov	Makbet	Individual	DNF	AC	DNS			AC
Nikola Dimitrov	Vals	Individual	24.00	14	12.25	9	36.25	13
Boris Pavlov	Monblan	Individual	16.00	10	10.50	6	26.50	10
Dimitar Ghenov; Khristo Katchov; Nikola Dimitrov; Boris Pavlov	See above	Team	76.50	6	83.00	5	159.50	6

== Fencing ==
Four fencers, all men, represented Bulgaria in 1980.

Men's sabre

- Vasil Etropolski
- Khristo Etropolski
- Georgi Chomakov

Men's team sabre

- Khristo Etropolski, Nikolay Marincheshki, Vasil Etropolski, Georgi Chomakov

== Judo ==
Men

Athlete	Event	Round 1	Round 2	Round 3	Round 4	Repechage 1	Repechage 2	Final / BM	
Athlete	Event	Opposition Result	Opposition Result	Opposition Result	Opposition Result	Opposition Result	Opposition Result	Opposition Result	Rank
Iliyan Nedkov	−65kg	Jimmy Arévalo (ECU); W 1000-0000	José António Branco (POR); W 1000-0000	Nikolai Solodukhin (URS); L 0000-0010	BYE		Jaroslav Kříž (TCH); W 0100-0000	Torsten Reissmann (GDR); W 0010-0000	Bronze medal
Georgi Petrov	−78kg	BYE	Vladimír Bárta (TCH); W 0001-0000	Shota Khabareli (URS); L 0000-0001	BYE		Harald Heinke (GDR); L 0000-0010	Did not advance	7
Tsancho Atanasov	−95kg	Luiz Virgilio Moura (BRA); L 0000-1000	Did not advance						19
Dimitar Zapryanov	+95kg	BYE		Radomir Kovačević (YUG); W 1000-0000	Myong Gyu Kim (PRK); W 0001-0000	BYE		Angelo Parisi (FRA); L 0000–1000	Silver medal
Dimitar Zapryanov	Open	BYE	Walter Carmona (BRA); W 0001-0000	Arthur Mapp (GBR); L 0000–0100	Did not advance				8

== Modern pentathlon ==
Three male pentathletes represented Bulgaria in 1980.

Athlete	Event	Shooting (10 m air pistol)	Fencing (épée one touch)	Swimming (200 m freestyle)	Riding (show jumping)	Running (3000 m)	Total points	Final rank
Athlete	Event	Points	Points	Points	Points	Points	Total points	Final rank
Borislav Batikov	Men's	978	740	934	1164	982	4798	34
Simeon Monev	Men's	1010	636	1088	1148	1033	4915	28
Nikolai Nikolov	Men's	1004	740	1066	1028	994	4832	30
Borislav Batikov; Simeon Monev; Nikolai Nikolov	Team	2992	2116	3088	3340	3009	14545	10

== Rowing ==
Men

Athlete	Event	Heats		Repechage		Semifinals		Final	
Athlete	Event	Time	Rank	Time	Rank	Time	Rank	Time	Rank
Chavdar Radoev	Single sculls	8:04.96	5 R	7:28.96	3 Q	7:34.21	6 FB	7:23.50	10
Dimitar Petrov; Stoyko Khadilev	Double sculls	7:21.83	5 R	7:01.25	4 FB	—N/a		6:43.81	9
Tsvetan Petkov; Rumen Khristov; Todor Kishev	Coxed pair	7:58.31	2 Q	7:25.77	2 Q	—N/a		7:09.21	5
Mincho Nikolov; Lyubomir Petrov; Ivo Rusev; Bogdan Dobrev	Quadruple sculls	6:01.68	2 R	6:00.78	2 Q	—N/a		5:52.38	Bronze medal
Georgi Georgiev; Lachezar Boychev; Kiril Kirchev; Valentin Stoev	Coxless four	6:47.21	3 R	6:22.57	3 Q	—N/a		6:22.49	9
Khristo Aleksandrov; Vilkhelm Germanov; Georgi Petkov; Stoyan Stoyanov; Nenko Dobrev	Coxed Four	6:53.37	4 R	6:31.46	2 Q	—N/a		6:28.13	5
Dimitar Yanakiev; Todor Mrankov; Bozhidar Rangelov; Ivan Botev; Yani Ignatov; Mikhail Petrov; Petar Patsev; Veselin Shterev; Ventseslav Kanchev	Eight	6:03.99	4 R	5:46.28	2 Q	—N/a		6:04.05	6

Women

Athlete	Event	Heats		Repechage		Semifinals		Final	
Athlete	Event	Time	Rank	Time	Rank	Time	Rank	Time	Rank
Rositsa Spasova	Single sculls	4:01.33	1 Q	BYE		3:47.86	3 Q	3:47.22	4
Svetla Otsetova; Zdravka Yordanova	Double sculls	3:37.86	4 R	3:21.36	2 Q	—N/a		3:23.14	4
Siika Barboulova; Stoyanka Kubatova	Coxless pair	4:00.38	3 R	3:37.48	3 Q	—N/a		3:32.39	Bronze medal
Mariana Serbezova; Rumelyana Boncheva; Dolores Nakova; Anka Bakova; Anka Georgieva	Quadruple sculls	3:14.91	1 Q	BYE		—N/a		3:16.10	Bronze medal
Ginka Gyurova; Mariyka Modeva; Rita Todorova; Iskra Velinova; Nadiya Filipova	Coxed four	3:26.75	1 Q	BYE		—N/a		3:20.75	Silver medal
Daniela Stavreva; Stefka Koleva; Snezkha Khristeva; Rumyana Kostova; Todorka Vasileva; Vaneta Karamandzhukova; Mariana Mincheva; Valentina Aleksandrova; Stanka Georgieva	Eight	3:20.25	3 R	3:15.49	2 Q	—N/a		3:10.03	5

== Sailing ==
Open

Athlete	Event	Race							Net points	Final rank
Athlete	Event	1	2	3	4	5	6	7	Net points	Final rank
Nikolai Vasilev	Finn	~~DSQ~~	18	11	16	14	DNF	7	124.0	18
Mitko Kabakov; Dimitr Georgiev	Flying Dutchman	13	13	~~14~~	13	14	13	10	112.0	14
Tsviatko Penchev; Krasimir Krastev	Tornado	11	10	10	8	9	~~RET~~	10	94.0	10

== Shooting ==
Open

Athlete	Event	Final	
Athlete	Event	Score	Rank
Lyubcho Dyakov	50 m pistol	565	Bronze medal
Kiril Gechevski	Skeet	184	37
Ivan Mandov	25 m rapid fire pistol	592	12
Anton Manolov	Skeet	192	21
Nonka Matova	50 m rifle three positions	1163	6
Nonka Matova	50 m rifle prone	597	7
Stayko Nenov	Trap	187	18
Lyuben Popov	50 m pistol	575	11
Todor Stoimenov	25 m rapid fire pistol	590	16
Emiliyan Yankov	50 m rifle three positions	1142	22
Pencho Vichev	Trap	188	14
Petar Zapryanov	50 m rifle prone	598	Bronze medal

== Swimming ==
Men

Athlete	Event	Heat		Semifinal		Final	
Athlete	Event	Time	Rank	Time	Rank	Time	Rank
Plamen Alexandrov	100 metre breaststroke	1:07.45	20	Did not advance			
Tzvetan Golomeev	100 metre freestyle	53.50	30	Did not advance			
Tzvetan Golomeev	200 metre freestyle	1:55.88	29	Did not advance			
Petar Kochanov	200 metre freestyle	1:54.45	18	Did not advance			
Petar Kochanov	400 metre freestyle	4:05.28	23	Did not advance			
Branimir Popov	100 metre backstroke	1:00.06	21	Did not advance			
Yulian Vasilev	100 metre freestyle	53.61	31	Did not advance			
Yulian Vasilev	100 metre butterfly	57.27	17	Did not advance			
Petar Kochanov; Krasimir Tumanov; Petar Stoianov; Tsvetan Golomeev	4 × 200 m freestyle relay	DSQ		Did not advance			
Branimir Popov; Plamen Donchev; Yulian Vasilev; Tsvetan Golomeev	4 × 100 m medley relay	3:58.35	10	Did not advance			

Women

Athlete	Event	Heat		Final	
Athlete	Event	Time	Rank	Time	Rank
Tanya Bogomilova	100 metre breaststroke	1:13.52	13	Did not advance	
Tanya Bogomilova	200 metre breaststroke	2:39.11	13	Did not advance	
Sonya Dangalakova	200 metre freestyle	2:05.67	13	Did not advance	
Sonya Dangalakova	400 metre individual medley	4:56.26	8	4:49.25	6
Dobrinka Mincheva	200 metre freestyle	2:09.09	19	Did not advance	
Dobrinka Mincheva; Rumiana Nikolova; Ani Kostova; Sonya Dangalakova	4 × 100 m freestyle relay	3:59.65	8	3:56.34	7
Sonya Dangalakova; Tanya Bogomilova; Ani Moneva; Dobrinka Mincheva	4 × 100 m medley relay	4:24.69	7	4:22.38	8

== Volleyball ==
=== Men's team competition ===
==== Preliminary round ====
Pool A

Pos	Team	Pld	W	L	Pts	SW	SL	SR	SPW	SPL	SPR	Qualification
1	Soviet Union	4	4	0	8	12	1	12.000	193	122	1.582	Semifinals
2	Bulgaria	4	3	1	7	9	5	1.800	171	149	1.148	Semifinals
3	Cuba	4	1	3	5	6	9	0.667	181	178	1.017	5th–8th semifinals
4	Czechoslovakia	4	1	3	5	6	11	0.545	180	230	0.783	5th–8th semifinals
5	Italy	4	1	3	5	4	11	0.364	145	191	0.759	9th place match

Date	Venue		Score		Set 1	Set 2	Set 3	Set 4	Set 5	Total
22 Jul	MAC	Bulgaria	3–1	Cuba	15–7	15–8	6–15	15–8		51–38
24 Jul	DMA	Bulgaria	3–0	Czechoslovakia	15–12	15–5	15–7			45–24
26 Jul	MAC	Soviet Union	3–0	Bulgaria	15–6	15–8	15–10			45–24
28 Jul	MAC	Bulgaria	3–1	Italy	15–9	15–9	6–15	15–9		51–42

==== Semifinals ====
Date	Venue		Score		Set 1	Set 2	Set 3	Set 4	Set 5	Total
30 Jul	MAC	Bulgaria	3–0	Poland	15–13	15–13	15–7			45–33

==== Gold-medal match ====
Date	Venue		Score		Set 1	Set 2	Set 3	Set 4	Set 5	Total
01 Aug	MAC	Soviet Union	3–1	Bulgaria	15–7	15–13	14–16	15–11		59–47

==== Team roster ====
- Stoyan Gunchev
- Hristo Stoyanov
- Dimitar Zlatanov
- Dimitar Dimitrov
- Tsano Tsanov
- Stefan Dimitrov
- Petko Petkov
- Mitko Todorov
- Kaspar Simeonov
- Emil Valtchev
- Hristo Iliev
- Yordan Angelov

=== Women's team competition ===
==== Preliminary round ====
Teams in two groups played each other in a round to decide, for which place each of them should compete in the semi-finals and the finals.

Group B

Pos	Team	Pld	W	L	Pts	SW	SL	SR	SPW	SPL	SPR	Qualification
1	Bulgaria	3	2	1	5	7	4	1.750	138	114	1.211	1st–4th semifinals
2	Hungary	3	2	1	5	8	6	1.333	161	170	0.947	1st–4th semifinals
3	Romania	3	2	1	5	7	7	1.000	157	153	1.026	5th–8th semifinals
4	Brazil	3	0	3	3	4	9	0.444	152	171	0.889	5th–8th semifinals

Date	Venue		Score		Set 1	Set 2	Set 3	Set 4	Set 5	Total
21 July	MAC	Bulgaria	3–1	Romania	15–9	7–15	15–5	15–4	-	52–33
23 July	MAC	Bulgaria	3–0	Brazil	15–7	15–9	15–12	-	-	45–28
25 July	MAC	Bulgaria	1–3	Hungary	15–8	9–15	7–15	10–15	-	41–53

==== Semifinal ====
Date	Venue		Score		Set 1	Set 2	Set 3	Set 4	Set 5	Total
27 Aug	MAC	East Germany	3–2	Bulgaria	15–10	12–15	15–9	7-15	15–6	64–55

==== 3rd Place Match ====
Date	Venue		Score		Set 1	Set 2	Set 3	Set 4	Set 5	Total
29 Aug	MAC	Bulgaria	3–2	Hungary	15–5	13–15	6–15	15–4	15–8	64–47

==== Team roster ====
- Tania Dimitrova
- Valentina Ilieva
- Galina Stancheva
- Silva Petrunova
- Anka Khristolova
- Verka Borisova
- Margarita Gerasimova
- Rumiana Kaicheva
- Maia Georgieva
- Tania Gogova
- Tsvetana Bozhurina
- Rositsa Dimitrova

== Water polo ==
=== Group C ===
	Team	Points	G	W	D	L	GF	GA	Diff
1.	Yugoslavia	5	3	2	1	0	24	10	+14
2.	Cuba	5	3	2	1	0	19	11	+8
3.	Australia	2	3	1	0	2	15	20	–5
4.	Bulgaria	0	3	0	0	3	8	25	–17

=== Group B ===
	Team	Points	G	W	D	L	GF	GA	Diff
7.	Australia	9	5	4	1	0	30	19	+11
8.	Italy	8	5	4	0	1	26	18	+8
9.	Romania	7	5	3	1	1	36	26	+10
10.	Greece	4	5	2	0	3	28	28	0
11.	Sweden	2	5	1	0	4	23	40	–17
12.	Bulgaria	0	5	0	0	5	25	37	–12

- Team Roster
  - Volodia Sirakov
  - Andrei Andreev
  - Kiril Kiriakov
  - Asen Denchev
  - Vasil Nanov
  - Anton Partalev
  - Petar Kostadinov
  - Nikolai Stamatov
  - Biser Georgiev
  - Matei Popov
  - Georgi Gospodinov

== Weightlifting ==
Men

Athlete	Event	Snatch		Clean & Jerk		Total	Rank
Athlete	Event	Result	Rank	Result	Rank	Total	Rank
Stefan Dimitrov	−60 kg	127.5	2	160	1	287.5	Silver medal
Yanko Rusev	−67,5 kg	147.5	1	195	1	342.5	Gold medal
Mincho Pashov	−67,5 kg	142.5	5	182.5	3	325	Bronze medal
Asen Zlatev	−75 kg	160	1	200	2	360	Gold medal
Nedelcho Kolev	−75 kg	157.5	2	187.5	3	345	Bronze medal
Blagoy Blagoev	−82,5 kg	175	2	197.5	5	372.5	Silver medal
Krasimir Drandarov	−82,5 kg	155	4	200	4	355	5
Rumen Aleksandrov	−90 kg	170	2	205	3	375	Silver medal
Plamen Asparukhov	−100 kg	170	7	0	NVL	170	DNF
Valentin Khristov	−110 kg	185	1	220	2	405	Silver medal

== Wrestling ==
=== Men's freestyle ===
Athlete	Event	Elimination Pool							Final round	
Athlete	Event	Round 1 Result	Round 2 Result	Round 3 Result	Round 4 Result	Round 5 Result	Round 6 Result	Round 7 Result	Final round Result	Rank
Rumen Yordanov	−48 kg	Khaled El-Rifai (SYR); W T 7:53	Jorge Frías (MEX); L 10-12	Sergei Kornilayev (URS); L 6-8	—N/a				Did not advance	7
Nermedin Selimov	−52 kg	Mark Dunbar (GBR); W T 1:40	Ashok Kumar (IND); W T 2:25	Koce Efremov (YUG); W T 4:37	Jang Dok-Ryong (PRK); W 16-6	Anatoli Beloglazov (URS); L T 1:53	Lajos Szabó (HUN); W 19-3	—N/a	Władysław Stecyk (POL); L 5-6	Bronze medal
Ivan Tsochev	−57 kg	Sergei Beloglazov (URS); L T 4:46	Mahmoud El-Messouti (SYR); W T 4:26	Antonio La Bruna (ITA); W 13-1	Sándor Németh (HUN); W T 6:40	Dugarsürengiin Oyuunbold (MGL); L 6-9	—N/a		Did not advance	4
Miho Dukov	−62 kg	Jan Szymański (POL); W T 5:27	Raúl Cascaret (CUB); W 8-8	Zoltán Szalontai (HUN); W 16-8	Magomedgasan Abushev (URS); L 2-4	Aurel Şuteu (ROU); W 10-3	—N/a		Georgios Hatziioannidis (GRE); W T 2:04	Silver medal
Ivan Yankov	−68 kg	Oscar Segers (BEL); W 15-1	Eberhard Probst (GDR); W 11-3	José Ramos (CUB); W 11-3	Saipulla Absaidov (URS); L 1-6	Jagmander Balyan Singh (IND); W 11-7	—N/a		Šaban Sejdi (YUG); W 6-2	Silver medal
Valentin Raychev	−74 kg	Bartl Brötzner (AUT); W T 4:20	Riccardo Niccolini (ITA); W T 7:59	Reinhold Steingräber (GDR); W 25-6	Rajander Singh (IND); W 12-8	Ryszard Ścigalski (POL); W 9-4	Pavel Pinigin (URS); W T 1:59	Dan Karabin (YUG); W 10-6	Jamtsyn Davaajav (MGL); W 6-5	Gold medal
Ismail Abilov	−82 kg	Sören Claeson (SWE); W T 4:01	Vasile Ţigănaş (ROU); W T 0:46	Günter Busarello (AUT); W DQ 7:25	Abdula Memedi (YUG); W T 4:19	Magomedkhan Aratsilov (URS); W 8-4	—N/a		István Kovács (HUN); W T 1:48	Gold medal
Ivan Ginov	−90 kg	Kartar Singh (IND); W DQ 7:55	BYE	Sanasar Oganisyan (URS); L 6-12	Ion Ivanov (ROU); W 7-4	Uwe Neupert (GDR); L 3-4	—N/a		Did not advance	4
Slavcho Chervenkov	−100 kg	Antal Bodó (HUN); W DQ 6:42	Bourcard Bineli (CMR); W T 1:14	Ambroise Sarr (SEN); W T 1:08	Ilya Mate (URS); W 6-4	BYE	—N/a		Július Strnisko (TCH); W 11-3	Silver medal
Petar Ivanov	+100 kg	József Balla (HUN); L DQ 8:37	Youssef Dibo (SYR); W T 0:58	Roland Gehrke (GDR); L 3-5	—N/a				Did not advance	7

=== Men's Greco-Roman ===
Athlete	Event	Elimination Pool						Final round	
Athlete	Event	Round 1 Result	Round 2 Result	Round 3 Result	Round 4 Result	Round 5 Result	Round 6 Result	Final round Result	Rank
Pavel Hristov	−48kg	Kent Andersson (SWE); W DQ 8:16	Vincenzo Maenza (ITA); W DQ 14-4	Reijo Haaparanta (FIN); W 27-0	Constantin Alexandru (ROU); L DQ 7:34	Zhaksylyk Ushkempirov (URS); L 7-12	—N/a	Did not advance	4
Mladen Mladenov	−52kg	Haralambos Holidis (GRE); W T 8:28	Taisto Halonen (FIN); W 4-3	Vakhtang Blagidze (URS); L 2-7	Nicu Gingă (ROU); W 5-2	—N/a		Lajos Rácz (HUN); L 0-5	Bronze medal
Georgi Donev	−57kg	Pertti Ukkola (FIN); W T 7:23	Józef Lipień (POL); L T 17:7	Benni Ljungbeck (SWE); L 4-10	—N/a			Did not advance	8
Panaiot Kirov	−62kg	Radwan Karout (SYR); W DQ 5:37	István Tóth (HUN); L D 7:00	Kazimierz Lipień (POL); W 5-3	Ivan Frgić (YUG); L DQ 7:15	—N/a		Did not advance	5
Ivan Atanasov	−68kg	Ștefan Rusu (ROU); L T 5:35	Ferenc Čaba (YUG); W 7-2	Lionel Lacaze (FRA); W DQ 8:36	Lars-Erik Skiöld (SWE); L 10-10	—N/a		Did not advance	6
Yanko Chopov	−74kg	Karolj Kasap (YUG); W DQ 7:57	Kaj Jægergaard (DEN); W T 2:28	Ferenc Kocsis (HUN); W 4-3	Vítězslav Mácha (TCH); W 6-2	Anatoly Bykov (URS); L 4-5	—N/a	Did not advance	4
Pavel Pavlov	−82kg	Aduuchiin Baatarkhüü (MGL); W T 3:48	Detlef Kühn (GDR); W DQ 5:42	Mihály Toma (HUN); W DQ 8:01	Leif Andersson (SWE); W 4-3	Gennadi Korban (URS); L 4-11	—N/a	Jan Dołgowicz (POL); L T 1:28	Bronze medal
Stoyan Ivanov	−90kg	Igor Kanygin (URS); L DQ 7:09	Darko Nišavić (YUG); W DQ 4:58	Petre Dicu (ROU); L 2-6	—N/a			Did not advance	9
Georgi Raikov	−100kg	BYE	Tamás Gáspár (HUN); W DQ 8:05	Oldřich Dvořák (TCH); W DQ 6:39	Vasile Andrei (ROU); W 7-2	—N/a		Roman Bierła (POL); W D 7:52	Gold medal
Aleksandar Tomov	+100kg	Prvoslav Ilić (YUG); W DQ 3:57	József Farkas (HUN); W DQ 5:16	Roman Codreanu (ROU); W DQ 7:25	Hassan Bechara (LIB); W T 0:55	—N/a		Alexander Kolchinsky (URS); L 2-4	Silver medal
