= Bulgaria at the Olympics =

- IOC code: BUL
- NOC: Bulgarian Olympic Committee
- Website: www.bgolympic.org (in Bulgarian and English)
- Medals Ranked 26th: Gold 58 Silver 91 Bronze 90 Total 239

Summer appearances
- 1896; 1900–1920; 1924; 1928; 1932; 1936; 1948; 1952; 1956; 1960; 1964; 1968; 1972; 1976; 1980; 1984; 1988; 1992; 1996; 2000; 2004; 2008; 2012; 2016; 2020; 2024

Winter appearances
- 1936; 1948; 1952; 1956; 1960; 1964; 1968; 1972; 1976; 1980; 1984; 1988; 1992; 1994; 1998; 2002; 2006; 2010; 2014; 2018; 2022; 2026

Bulgaria first participated at the Olympic Games at the inaugural 1896 Games, with a single gymnast. However, since Charles Champaud was a Swiss national living in Sofia, some sources credit his appearance to Switzerland instead.

The Bulgarian Olympic Committee was created in 1923 and first sent a team to the Summer Olympic Games in 1924. The nation has participated in every Summer Games since then, except for 1932 (during the Great Depression), 1948 (Bulgaria's role in World War II) and 1984 (part of the Soviet-led boycott of the 1984 Summer Olympics). Bulgaria first participated in the Winter Olympic Games in 1936 and has attended every Winter Games since then.

Bulgarian athletes have won a total of 239 medals, with wrestling and weightlifting as the top medal-producing sports. After the fall of the communist regime in 1989–90, in Bulgaria's turbulent transition to free-market democracy, top-notch state support for Bulgarian Olympians disintegrated. Diminishing and marginalized medal returns were evident from the 2012 Summer Olympics, where Bulgaria, a former top-10 Olympic powerhouse in the late 1980s, fell out of its former high stature. Bulgaria's best performance to date has come in the 1980 Summer Olympics, where they finished third in the medal table. In the 1988 Summer Olympics, Bulgaria ranked 7th but won the nation's largest total of gold medals. Bulgaria's most successful Winter Olympics occurred in 1998 when the country ranked 15th in the medal table.

== Medal tables ==
=== Medals by Summer Games ===
Games	Athletes	Gold	Silver	Bronze	Total	Rank
(Kingdom of Greece) 1896 Athens	1	0	0	0	0	–
1900–1920	did not participate					
(French Third Republic) 1924 Paris	24	0	0	0	0	–
(Netherlands) 1928 Amsterdam	5	0	0	0	0	–
(United States) 1932 Los Angeles	did not participate					
(Nazi Germany) 1936 Berlin	26	0	0	0	0	–
(United Kingdom) 1948 London	did not participate					
(Finland) 1952 Helsinki	63	0	0	1	1	40
(Australia) 1956 Melbourne	43	1	3	1	5	19
(Italy) 1960 Rome	98	1	3	3	7	15
(Japan) 1964 Tokyo	63	3	5	2	10	11
1968 Mexico City	112	2	4	3	9	18
(West Germany) 1972 Munich	130	6	10	5	21	9
(Canada) 1976 Montreal	158	6	9	7	22	7
(Soviet Union) 1980 Moscow	270	8	16	17	41	3
(United States) 1984 Los Angeles	boycotted					
(South Korea) 1988 Seoul	171	10	12	13	35	7
(Spain) 1992 Barcelona	138	3	7	6	16	18
(United States) 1996 Atlanta	110	3	7	5	15	22
(Australia) 2000 Sydney	91	5	6	2	13	16
(Greece) 2004 Athens	95	2	1	9	12	33
(China) 2008 Beijing	72	1	1	3	5	42
(United Kingdom) 2012 London	63	0	2	1	3	63
(Brazil) 2016 Rio de Janeiro	51	0	1	2	3	65
(Japan) 2020 Tokyo	42	3	1	2	6	30
(France) 2024 Paris	46	3	1	3	7	26
(United States) 2028 Los Angeles	future event					
(Australia) 2032 Brisbane	future event					
Total (22/30)	1,872	57	89	85	231	23

=== Medals by Winter Games ===
Games	Athletes	Gold	Silver	Bronze	Total	Rank
(Nazi Germany) 1936 Garmisch-Partenkirchen	7	0	0	0	0	–
(Switzerland) 1948 St. Moritz	4	0	0	0	0	–
(Norway) 1952 Oslo	10	0	0	0	0	–
(Italy) 1956 Cortina d'Ampezzo	7	0	0	0	0	–
(United States) 1960 Squaw Valley	7	0	0	0	0	–
(Austria) 1964 Innsbruck	7	0	0	0	0	–
(France) 1968 Grenoble	6	0	0	0	0	–
(Japan) 1972 Sapporo	4	0	0	0	0	–
(Austria) 1976 Innsbruck	29	0	0	0	0	–
(United States) 1980 Lake Placid	8	0	0	1	1	17
(Socialist Federal Republic of Yugoslavia) 1984 Sarajevo	16	0	0	0	0	–
(Canada) 1988 Calgary	26	0	0	0	0	–
(France) 1992 Albertville	30	0	0	0	0	–
(Norway) 1994 Lillehammer	17	0	0	0	0	–
(Japan) 1998 Nagano	19	1	0	0	1	15
(United States) 2002 Salt Lake City	23	0	1	2	3	20
(Italy) 2006 Turin	21	0	1	0	1	21
(Canada) 2010 Vancouver	19	0	0	0	0	–
(Russia) 2014 Sochi	18	0	0	0	0	–
(South Korea) 2018 Pyeongchang	21	0	0	0	0	–
(China) 2022 Beijing	15	0	0	0	0	–
(Italy) 2026 Milano Cortina	20	0	0	2	2	28
(France) 2030 French Alps	future event					
(United States) 2034 Utah	future event					
Total (22/25)	334	1	2	5	8	41

=== Medals by summer sport ===
Sport	Gold	Silver	Bronze	Total
Wrestling	18	32	23	73
Weightlifting	13	17	9	39
Athletics	5	8	6	19
Boxing	5	5	10	20
Shooting	4	7	6	17
Canoeing	4	5	8	17
Gymnastics	3	5	8	16
Rowing	3	4	7	14
Swimming	1	1	1	3
Karate	1	0	0	1
Judo	0	1	2	3
Basketball	0	1	1	2
Football	0	1	1	2
Volleyball	0	1	1	2
Equestrian	0	1	0	1
Taekwondo	0	0	1	1
Tennis	0	0	1	1
Totals (17 entries)	57	89	85	231

=== Medals by winter sport ===
Sport	Gold	Silver	Bronze	Total
Biathlon	1	0	2	3
Short track speed skating	0	2	1	3
Cross country skiing	0	0	1	1
Snowboarding	0	0	1	1
Totals (4 entries)	1	2	5	8

== List of medalists ==
=== Summer Olympics ===
Medal	(Bulgaria) Name	Games	Sport	Event
Bronze	Boris Nikolov	1952 Helsinki	Boxing	Middleweight (-75kg)
Gold	Nikola Stanchev	1956 Melbourne	Wrestling	Freestyle 79 kg
Silver	Dimitar Dobrev	1956 Melbourne	Wrestling	Greco-Roman middleweight
Silver	Petko Sirakov	1956 Melbourne	Wrestling	Greco-Roman light heavyweight
Silver	Husein Mehmedov	1956 Melbourne	Wrestling	Freestyle +87 kg
Bronze	Football team: Stefan Bozhkov Todor Diev Georgi Dimitrov (footballer, born 1931) Milcho Goranov Ivan Petkov Kolev Nikola Kovachev Manol Manolov Dimitar Milanov Georgi Naydenov Panayot Panayotov Kiril Rakarov Gavril Stoyanov Krum Yanev Yosif Yosifov Iliya Kirchev Pavel Vladimirov	1956 Melbourne	Association Football	Men's team competition
Gold	Dimitar Dobrev	1960 Rome	Wrestling	Greco-Roman 79 kg
Silver	Krali Bimbalov	1960 Rome	Wrestling	Greco-Roman 87 kg
Silver	Nezhdet Zalev	1960 Rome	Wrestling	Freestyle 57 kg
Silver	Stancho Kolev	1960 Rome	Wrestling	Freestyle 62 kg
Bronze	Velik Kapsazov	1960 Rome	Gymnastics	Rings
Bronze	Dinko Petrov	1960 Rome	Wrestling	Greco-Roman 57 kg
Bronze	Enyu Valchev	1960 Rome	Wrestling	Freestyle 67 kg
Gold	Boyan Radev	1964 Tokyo	Wrestling	Greco-Roman 97 kg
Gold	Enyu Valchev	1964 Tokyo	Wrestling	Freestyle 70 kg
Gold	Prodan Gardzhev	1964 Tokyo	Wrestling	Freestyle 87 kg
Silver	Velichko Velichkov	1964 Tokyo	Shooting	50 metre rifle, three positions
Silver	Angel Kerezov	1964 Tokyo	Wrestling	Greco-Roman 52 kg
Silver	Kiril Petkov	1964 Tokyo	Wrestling	Greco-Roman 78 kg
Silver	Stancho Kolev	1964 Tokyo	Wrestling	Freestyle 63 kg
Silver	Lyutvi Ahmedov	1964 Tokyo	Wrestling	Freestyle +97 kg
Bronze	Alexander Nikolov	1964 Tokyo	Boxing	Light Heavyweight (– 81 kg)
Bronze	Said Mustafov	1964 Tokyo	Wrestling	Freestyle 97 kg
Gold	Petar Kirov	1968 Mexico City	Wrestling	Greco-Roman 52 kg
Gold	Boyan Radev	1968 Mexico City	Wrestling	Greco-Roman 97 kg
Silver	Football team: Stoyan Yordanov Atanas Gerov Georgi Hristakiev Milko Gaydarski Kiril Ivkov Ivaylo Georgiev Tsvetan Veselinov Evgeni Yanchovski Petar Zhekov Atanas Hristov Asparuh Donev Kiril Stankov Georgi Ivanov Todor Nikolov Yancho Dimitrov Ivan Zafirov Mihail Gyonin Georgi Vasilev	1968 Mexico City	Football	Men's team competition
Silver	Enyu Todorov	1968 Mexico City	Wrestling	Freestyle 63 kg
Silver	Enyu Valchev	1968 Mexico City	Wrestling	Freestyle 70 kg
Silver	Osman Duraliev	1968 Mexico City	Wrestling	Freestyle +97 kg
Bronze	Ivan Mihailov	1968 Mexico City	Boxing	Featherweight (– 57 kg)
Bronze	Georgi Stankov	1968 Mexico City	Boxing	Light Heavyweight (– 81 kg)
Bronze	Prodan Gardzhev	1968 Mexico City	Wrestling	Freestyle 87 kg
Gold	Georgi Kostadinov	1972 Munich	Boxing	Flyweight (– 51 kg)
Gold	Norair Nurikyan	1972 Munich	Weightlifting	60 kg
Gold	Yordan Bikov	1972 Munich	Weightlifting	75 kg
Gold	Andon Nikolov	1972 Munich	Weightlifting	90 kg
Gold	Petar Kirov	1972 Munich	Wrestling	Greco-Roman 52 kg
Gold	Georgi Markov (wrestler)	1972 Munich	Wrestling	Greco-Roman 62 kg
Silver	Diana Yorgova	1972 Munich	Athletics	Long jump
Silver	Yordanka Blagoeva	1972 Munich	Athletics	High jump
Silver	Angel Angelov	1972 Munich	Boxing	Light Welterweight(– 63.5 kg)
Silver	Mladen Kutchev	1972 Munich	Weightlifting	67.5 kg
Silver	Atanas Shopov	1972 Munich	Weightlifting	90 kg
Silver	Aleksandar Kraychev	1972 Munich	Weightlifting	110 kg
Silver	Ognyan Nikolov	1972 Munich	Wrestling	Freestyle 48 kg
Silver	Osman Duraliev	1972 Munich	Wrestling	Freestyle +100 kg
Silver	Stoyan Apostolov	1972 Munich	Wrestling	Greco-Roman 68 kg
Silver	Aleksandar Tomov	1972 Munich	Wrestling	Greco-Roman +100 kg
Bronze	Ivanka Khristova	1972 Munich	Athletics	Shot put
Bronze	Vasilka Stoeva	1972 Munich	Athletics	Discus throw
Bronze	Fedia Damianov; Ivan Burtchin	1972 Munich	Canoeing	C-2 1000 metres
Bronze	Ivan Krastev	1972 Munich	Wrestling	Freestyle 62 kg
Bronze	Stefan Angelov	1972 Munich	Wrestling	Greco-Roman 48 kg
Gold	Ivanka Khristova	1976 Montreal	Athletics	Shot put
Gold	Svetla Otsetova; Zdravka Yordanova	1976 Montreal	Rowing	Double sculls
Gold	Siyka Kelbecheva; Stoyanka Kurbatova-Gruicheva	1976 Montreal	Rowing	Coxless pairs
Gold	Norair Nurikyan	1976 Montreal	Weightlifting	56 kg
Gold	Yordan Mitkov	1976 Montreal	Weightlifting	75 kg
Gold	Hasan Isaev	1976 Montreal	Wrestling	Freestyle 48 kg
Silver	Nikolina Shtereva	1976 Montreal	Athletics	800 metres
Silver	Mariya Petkova	1976 Montreal	Athletics	Discus throw
Silver	Ginka Gyurova; Lilyana Vaseva; Reni Yordanova; Mariyka Modeva; Kapka Georgieva	1976 Montreal	Rowing	Coxed fours
Silver	Georgi Todorov	1976 Montreal	Weightlifting	60 kg
Silver	Trendafil Stoychev	1976 Montreal	Weightlifting	82.5 kg
Silver	Krastyu Semerdzhiev	1976 Montreal	Weightlifting	110 kg
Silver	Stoyan Nikolov	1976 Montreal	Wrestling	Greco-Roman 90 kg
Silver	Kamen Goranov	1976 Montreal	Wrestling	Greco-Roman 100 kg
Silver	Aleksandar Tomov	1976 Montreal	Wrestling	Greco-Roman +100 kg
Bronze	Yordanka Blagoeva	1976 Montreal	Athletics	High jump
Bronze	Basketball team: Krasimira Bogdanova Diana Dilova-Braynova Krasimira Gyurova Penka Metodieva Snezhana Mikhaylova Girgina Skerlatova Mariya Stoyanova Margarita Shtarkelova Petkana Makaveeva Nadka Golcheva Penka Stoyanova Todorka Yordanova	1976 Montreal	Basketball	Women's team competition
Bronze	Vladimir Kolev	1976 Montreal	Boxing	Light Welterweight(– 63.5 kg)
Bronze	Atanas Shopov	1976 Montreal	Weightlifting	90 kg
Bronze	Dimo Kostov	1976 Montreal	Wrestling	Freestyle 100 kg
Bronze	Stefan Angelov	1976 Montreal	Wrestling	Greco-Roman 48 kg
Bronze	Ivan Kolev	1976 Montreal	Wrestling	Greco-Roman 82 kg
Gold	Petar Lesov	1980 Moscow	Boxing	Flyweight (– 51 kg)
Gold	Lyubomir Lyubenov	1980 Moscow	Canoeing	C-1 1000 meters
Gold	Stoyan Deltchev	1980 Moscow	Gymnastics	Horizontal bar
Gold	Yanko Rusev	1980 Moscow	Weightlifting	67.5 kg
Gold	Asen Zlatev	1980 Moscow	Weightlifting	75 kg
Gold	Valentin Raychev	1980 Moscow	Wrestling	Freestyle 74 kg
Gold	Ismail Abilov	1980 Moscow	Wrestling	Freestyle 82 kg
Gold	Georgi Raykov	1980 Moscow	Wrestling	Greco-Roman 100 kg
Silver	Mariya Petkova	1980 Moscow	Athletics	Discus throw
Silver	Basketball team: Krasimira Bogdanova Vanya Dermendzhieva Silviya Germanova Petkana Makaveeva Nadka Golcheva Penka Stoyanova Evladiya Slavcheva Kostadinka Radkova Snezhana Mikhaylova Angelina Mikhaylova Penka Metodieva Diana Dilova-Braynova	1980 Moscow	Basketball	Women's team competition
Silver	Lyubomir Lyubenov	1980 Moscow	Canoeing	C-1 500 meters
Silver	Vanja Gesheva	1980 Moscow	Canoeing	K-1 500 meters
Silver	Petar Mandazhiev; Svetoslav Ivanov; Georgi Gadjev	1980 Moscow	Equestrian	Team Dressage
Silver	Dimitar Zapryanov	1980 Moscow	Judo	Heavyweight (+95 kg)
Silver	Ginka Gyurova; Mariyka Modeva; Rita Todorova; Iskra Velinova; Nadiya Filipova	1980 Moscow	Rowing	Coxed fours
Silver	Volleyball team: Yordan Angelov Dimitar Dimitrov Stefan Dimitrov Stoyan Gunchev Hristo Iliev Petko Petkov Kaspar Simeonov Hristo Stoyanov Mitko Todorov Tsano Tsanov Emil Valtchev Dimitar Zlatanov	1980 Moscow	Volleyball	Men's team competition
Silver	Stefan Dimitrov	1980 Moscow	Weightlifting	60 kg
Silver	Blagoy Blagoev	1980 Moscow	Weightlifting	82.5 kg
Silver	Rumen Aleksandrov	1980 Moscow	Weightlifting	90 kg
Silver	Valentin Hristov	1980 Moscow	Weightlifting	110 kg
Silver	Miho Dukov	1980 Moscow	Wrestling	Freestyle 62 kg
Silver	Ivan Yankov	1980 Moscow	Wrestling	Freestyle 68 kg
Silver	Slavcho Chervenkov	1980 Moscow	Wrestling	Freestyle 100 kg
Silver	Aleksandar Tomov	1980 Moscow	Wrestling	Greco-Roman +100 kg
Bronze	Petar Petrov	1980 Moscow	Athletics	100 metres
Bronze	Ivailo Marinov	1980 Moscow	Boxing	Light Flyweight (– 48 kg)
Bronze	Borislav Ananiev; Nikolai Ilkov	1980 Moscow	Canoeing	C-2 500 meters
Bronze	Borislav Borisov; Bozhidar Milenkov; Lazar Khristov; Ivan Manev	1980 Moscow	Canoeing	K-4 1000 meters
Bronze	Stoyan Deltchev	1980 Moscow	Gymnastics	Individual all-around
Bronze	Ilian Nedkov	1980 Moscow	Judo	Half Lightweight (65 kg)
Bronze	Mincho Nikolov; Lyubomir Petrov; Ivo Rusev; Bogdan Dobrev	1980 Moscow	Rowing	Quadruple sculls (coxless)
Bronze	Mariana Serbezova; Rumelyana Boncheva; Dolores Nakova; Anka Bakova; Anka Georgieva	1980 Moscow	Rowing	Quadruple sculls (coxed)
Bronze	Siyka Kelbecheva; Stoyanka Kurbatova-Gruicheva	1980 Moscow	Rowing	Coxless pairs
Bronze	Lyubcho Dyakov	1980 Moscow	Shooting	50 metre pistol
Bronze	Petar Zapryanov	1980 Moscow	Shooting	50 metre rifle prone
Bronze	Volleyball team: Verka Borisova Tsvetana Bozhurina Rositsa Dimitrova Tanya Dimitrova Maya Georgieva Margarita Gerasimova Tanya Gogova Valentina Ilieva Rumyana Kaisheva Anka Khristolova Silviya Petrunova Galina Stancheva	1980 Moscow	Volleyball	Women's team competition
Bronze	Mincho Pashov	1980 Moscow	Weightlifting	67.5 kg
Bronze	Nedelcho Kolev	1980 Moscow	Weightlifting	75 kg
Bronze	Nermedin Selimov	1980 Moscow	Wrestling	Freestyle 52 kg
Bronze	Mladen Mladenov	1980 Moscow	Wrestling	Greco-Roman 52 kg
Bronze	Pavel Pavlov	1980 Moscow	Wrestling	Greco-Roman 82 kg
Gold	Khristo Markov	1988 Seoul	Athletics	Triple jump
Gold	Yordanka Donkova	1988 Seoul	Athletics	100 metres hurdles
Gold	Ivailo Marinov	1988 Seoul	Boxing	Light Flyweight (– 48 kg)
Gold	Vanja Gesheva	1988 Seoul	Canoeing	K-1 500 metres
Gold	Lubomir Geraskov	1988 Seoul	Gymnastics	Pommel horse
Gold	Tanyu Kiryakov	1988 Seoul	Shooting	10 metre air pistol
Gold	Tanya Dangalakova	1988 Seoul	Swimming	100 metre breaststroke
Gold	Sevdalin Marinov	1988 Seoul	Weightlifting	52 kg
Gold	Borislav Gidikov	1988 Seoul	Weightlifting	75 kg
Gold	Atanas Komchev	1988 Seoul	Wrestling	Greco-Roman 90 kg
Silver	Stefka Kostadinova	1988 Seoul	Athletics	High jump
Silver	Aleksandar Khristov	1988 Seoul	Boxing	Bantamweight (– 54 kg)
Silver	Vanja Gesheva; Diana Paliiska	1988 Seoul	Canoeing	K-2 500 metres
Silver	Adriana Dunavska	1988 Seoul	Gymnastics	Individual all-around
Silver	Radka Stoyanova; Lalka Berberova	1988 Seoul	Rowing	Coxless pairs
Silver	Vesela Letcheva	1988 Seoul	Shooting	50 metre rifle three positions
Silver	Antoaneta Frenkeva	1988 Seoul	Swimming	100 metre breaststroke
Silver	Stefan Topurov	1988 Seoul	Weightlifting	60 kg
Silver	Ivan Tsonov	1988 Seoul	Wrestling	Freestyle 48 kg
Silver	Stoyan Balov	1988 Seoul	Wrestling	Greco-Roman 57 kg
Silver	Zhivko Vangelov	1988 Seoul	Wrestling	Greco-Roman 62 kg
Silver	Rangel Gerovski	1988 Seoul	Wrestling	Greco-Roman 130 kg
Bronze	Tsvetanka Khristova	1988 Seoul	Athletics	Discus throw
Bronze	Martin Marinov	1988 Seoul	Canoeing	C-1 500 metres
Bronze	Nikolay Bukhalov	1988 Seoul	Canoeing	C-1 1000 metres
Bronze	Vanja Gesheva; Diana Paliiska; Ogniana Petkova; Borislava Ivanova	1988 Seoul	Canoeing	K-4 500 metres
Bronze	Diana Doudeva	1988 Seoul	Gymnastics	Floor
Bronze	Magdalena Georgieva	1988 Seoul	Rowing	Single sculls
Bronze	Violeta Ninova; Stefka Madina	1988 Seoul	Rowing	Double sculls
Bronze	Antoaneta Frenkeva	1988 Seoul	Swimming	200 metre breaststroke
Bronze	Manuela Maleeva	1988 Seoul	Tennis	Women's singles
Bronze	Aleksandar Varbanov	1988 Seoul	Weightlifting	75 kg
Bronze	Simeon Shterev	1988 Seoul	Wrestling	Freestyle 62 kg
Bronze	Rahmat Sofiadi	1988 Seoul	Wrestling	Freestyle 74 kg
Bronze	Bratan Tsenov	1988 Seoul	Wrestling	Greco-Roman 48 kg
Gold	Nikolay Bukhalov	1992 Barcelona	Canoeing	C-1 500 metres
Gold	Nikolay Bukhalov	1992 Barcelona	Canoeing	C-1 1000 metres
Gold	Ivan Ivanov	1992 Barcelona	Weightlifting	52 kg
Silver	Tsvetanka Khristova	1992 Barcelona	Athletics	Discus throw
Silver	Daniel Petrov	1992 Barcelona	Boxing	Light Flyweight (– 48 kg)
Silver	Vesela Letcheva	1992 Barcelona	Shooting	10 metre air rifle
Silver	Nonka Matova	1992 Barcelona	Shooting	50 metre rifle three positions
Silver	Nikolay Peshalov	1992 Barcelona	Weightlifting	60 kg
Silver	Yoto Yotov	1992 Barcelona	Weightlifting	67.5 kg
Silver	Valentin Getsov	1992 Barcelona	Wrestling	Freestyle 68 kg
Bronze	Yordanka Donkova	1992 Barcelona	Athletics	100 metres hurdles
Bronze	Svilen Rusinov	1992 Barcelona	Boxing	Super Heavyweight (+91 kg)
Bronze	Martin Marinov; Blagovest Stoyanov	1992 Barcelona	Canoeing	C-2 500 metres
Bronze	Mariya Grozdeva	1992 Barcelona	Shooting	10 metre air pistol
Bronze	Stefan Botev	1992 Barcelona	Weightlifting	110 kg
Bronze	Valentin Yordanov	1992 Barcelona	Wrestling	Freestyle 52 kg
Gold	Stefka Kostadinova	1996 Atlanta	Athletics	High jump
Gold	Daniel Petrov	1996 Atlanta	Boxing	Light Flyweight (– 48 kg)
Gold	Valentin Yordanov	1996 Atlanta	Wrestling	Freestyle 52 kg
Silver	Serafim Todorov	1996 Atlanta	Boxing	Featherweight (– 57 kg)
Silver	Tontcho Tontchev	1996 Atlanta	Boxing	Lightweight (– 60 kg)
Silver	Krasimir Dounev	1996 Atlanta	Gymnastics	Horizontal bar
Silver	Ina Delcheva; Valentina Kevliyan; Maria Koleva; Maya Tabakova; Ivelina Taleva; Vjara Vatachka	1996 Atlanta	Gymnastics	Group all-around
Silver	Emil Milev	1996 Atlanta	Shooting	25 metre rapid fire pistol
Silver	Diana Iorgova	1996 Atlanta	Shooting	25 metre pistol
Silver	Yoto Yotov	1996 Atlanta	Weightlifting	76 kg
Bronze	Andrian Dushev; Milko Kazanov	1996 Atlanta	Canoeing	K-2 1000 metres
Bronze	Tanyu Kiryakov	1996 Atlanta	Shooting	10 metre air pistol
Bronze	Mariya Grozdeva	1996 Atlanta	Shooting	10 metre air pistol
Bronze	Sevdalin Minchev	1996 Atlanta	Weightlifting	54 kg
Bronze	Nikolay Peshalov	1996 Atlanta	Weightlifting	59 kg
Gold	Tereza Marinova	2000 Sydney	Athletics	Triple jump
Gold	Tanyu Kiryakov	2000 Sydney	Shooting	50 metre pistol
Gold	Mariya Grozdeva	2000 Sydney	Shooting	25 metre pistol
Gold	Galabin Boevski	2000 Sydney	Weightlifting	69 kg
Gold	Armen Nazaryan	2000 Sydney	Wrestling	Greco-Roman 58 kg
Silver	Petar Merkov	2000 Sydney	Canoeing	K-1 500 metres
Silver	Petar Merkov	2000 Sydney	Canoeing	K-1 1000 metres
Silver	Rumyana Neykova	2000 Sydney	Rowing	Single sculls
Silver	Georgi Markov	2000 Sydney	Weightlifting	69 kg
Silver	Alan Tsagaev	2000 Sydney	Weightlifting	105 kg
Silver	Serafim Barzakov	2000 Sydney	Wrestling	Freestyle 63 kg
Bronze	Yordan Yovchev	2000 Sydney	Gymnastics	Floor
Bronze	Yordan Yovchev	2000 Sydney	Gymnastics	Rings
Gold	Mariya Grozdeva	2004 Athens	Shooting	25 metre pistol
Gold	Milen Dobrev	2004 Athens	Weightlifting	94 kg
Silver	Yordan Yovchev	2004 Athens	Gymnastics	Rings
Bronze	Boris Georgiev	2004 Athens	Boxing	Light welterweight
Bronze	Yordan Yovchev	2004 Athens	Gymnastics	Floor
Bronze	Zhaneta Ilieva; Eleonora Kezhova; Zornitsa Marinova; Kristina Rangelova; Galina Tancheva; Vladislava Tancheva	2004 Athens	Gymnastics	Group all-around
Bronze	Georgi Georgiev	2004 Athens	Judo	Half-lightweight (66 kg)
Bronze	Ivo Yanakiev	2004 Athens	Rowing	Single sculls
Bronze	Rumyana Neykova	2004 Athens	Rowing	Single sculls
Bronze	Mariya Grozdeva	2004 Athens	Shooting	10 metre air pistol
Bronze	Velichko Cholakov	2004 Athens	Weightlifting	+105 kg
Bronze	Armen Nazaryan	2004 Athens	Wrestling	Greco-Roman 60 kg
Gold	Rumyana Neykova	2008 Beijing	Rowing	Single sculls
Silver	Stanka Zlateva	2008 Beijing	Wrestling	Freestyle 72 kg
Bronze	Radoslav Velikov	2008 Beijing	Wrestling	Freestyle 55 kg
Bronze	Kiril Terziev	2008 Beijing	Wrestling	Freestyle 74 kg
Bronze	Yavor Yanakiev	2008 Beijing	Wrestling	Greco-Roman 74 kg
Silver	Milka Maneva	2012 London	Weightlifting	Women's 63 kg
Silver	Stanka Zlateva	2012 London	Wrestling	Freestyle 72 kg
Bronze	Tervel Pulev	2012 London	Boxing	Heavyweight
Silver	Mirela Demireva	2016 Rio de Janeiro	Athletics	Women's high jump
Bronze	Elitsa Yankova	2016 Rio de Janeiro	Wrestling	Women's freestyle 48 kg
Bronze	Lyubomira Kazanova; Reneta Kamberova; Mihaela Maevska; Hristiana Todorova; Tsvetelina Naydenova	2016 Rio de Janeiro	Gymnastics	Group all-around
Gold	Ivet Goranova	2020 Tokyo	Karate	Women's 55 kg
Gold	Stoyka Krasteva	2020 Tokyo	Boxing	Women's flyweight
Gold	Simona Dyankova; Stefani Kiryakova; Madlen Radukanova; Laura Traets; Erika Zafirova	2020 Tokyo	Gymnastics	Group all-around
Silver	Antoaneta Kostadinova	2020 Tokyo	Shooting	Women's 10m air pistol
Bronze	Taybe Yusein	2020 Tokyo	Wrestling	Women's freestyle 62 kg
Bronze	Evelina Nikolova	2020 Tokyo	Wrestling	Women's freestyle 57 kg
Gold	Semen Novikov	2024 Paris	Wrestling	Greco-Roman 87 kg
Gold	Magomed Ramazanov	2024 Paris	Wrestling	Men's freestyle 86 kg
Gold	Karlos Nasar	2024 Paris	Weightlifting	Men's 89 kg
Silver	Boryana Kaleyn	2024 Paris	Gymnastics	Individual all-around
Bronze	Kimia Alizadeh	2024 Paris	Taekwondo	Women's 57 kg
Bronze	Bozhidar Andreev	2024 Paris	Weightlifting	Men's 73 kg
Bronze	Javier Ibáñez	2024 Paris	Boxing	Men's featherweight

=== Winter Olympics ===
Medal	(Bulgaria) Name	Games	Sport	Event
Bronze	Ivan Lebanov	1980 Lake Placid	Cross-country skiing	Cross-country skiing 30 km
Gold	Ekaterina Dafovska	1998 Nagano	Biathlon	Individual
Silver	Evgenia Radanova	2002 Salt Lake City	Short track speed skating	500 metres
Bronze	Irina Nikulchina	2002 Salt Lake City	Biathlon	Pursuit
Bronze	Evgenia Radanova	2002 Salt Lake City	Short track speed skating	1500 metres
Silver	Evgenia Radanova	2006 Turin	Short track speed skating	500 metres
Bronze	Tervel Zamfirov	2026 Milano Cortina	Snowboarding	Men's giant slalom
Bronze	Lora Hristova	2026 Milano Cortina	Biathlon	Women's individual

== Multiple medal winners ==
Athlete	Sport	Gender	Years	Games	1st place, gold medalist(s)	2nd place, silver medalist(s)	3rd place, bronze medalist(s)	Total
Maria Grozdeva	Shooting	F	1992, 1996, 2000, 2004, 2008, 2012, 2020	Summer	2	0	3	5
Nikolay Bukhalov	Canoeing	M	1988, 1992, 1996, 2000	Summer	2	0	1	3
Tanyu Kiryakov	Shooting	M	1988, 1992, 1996, 2000, 2004, 2008	Summer	2	0	1	3
Boyan Radev	Wrestling	M	1964, 1968	Summer	2	0	0	2
Petar Kirov	Wrestling	M	1968, 1972, 1976	Summer	2	0	0	2
Norair Nurikyan	Weightlifting	M	1972, 1976	Summer	2	0	0	2
Vanja Gesheva	Kayaking	F	1980, 1988	Summer	1	2	1	4
Enyu Valchev	Wrestling	M	1960, 1964, 1968	Summer	1	1	1	3
Rumyana Neykova	Rowing	F	1992, 1996, 2000, 2004, 2008	Summer	1	1	1	3
Dimitar Dobrev	Wrestling	M	1956, 1960	Summer	1	1	0	2
Lyubomir Lyubenov	Canoeing	M	1980	Summer	1	1	0	2
Stefka Kostadinova	Athletics	F	1988, 1992, 1996	Summer	1	1	0	2
Daniel Petrov	Boxing	M	1992, 1996	Summer	1	1	0	2
Prodan Gardzhev	Wrestling	M	1960, 1964, 1968	Summer	1	0	1	2
Ivanka Hristova	Athletics	F	1964, 1968, 1972, 1976	Summer	1	0	1	2
Siyka Kelbecheva	Rowing	F	1976, 1980	Summer	1	0	1	2
Stoyanka Kurbatova-Gruycheva	Rowing	F	1976, 1980	Summer	1	0	1	2
Stoyan Deltchev	Gymnastics	M	1976, 1980	Summer	1	0	1	2
Ivailo Marinov	Boxing	M	1980, 1988	Summer	1	0	1	2
Yordanka Donkova	Athletics	F	1980, 1988, 1992	Summer	1	0	1	2
Valentin Yordanov	Wrestling	M	1988, 1992, 1996	Summer	1	0	1	2
Armen Nazaryan	Wrestling	M	2000, 2004, 2008	Summer	1	0	1	2
Aleksandar Tomov	Wrestling	M	1972, 1976, 1980	Summer	0	3	0	3
Evgenia Radanova	Short track speed skating	F	1994, 1998, 2002, 2004, 2006, 2010	Winter	0	2	1	3
Stancho Kolev	Wrestling	M	1960, 1964	Summer	0	2	0	2
Osman Duraliev	Wrestling	M	1968, 1972	Summer	0	2	0	2
Mariya Petkova	Athletics	F	1976, 1980	Summer	0	2	0	2
Ginka Gyurova	Rowing	F	1976, 1980	Summer	0	2	0	2
Mariyka Modeva	Rowing	F	1976, 1980	Summer	0	2	0	2
Vesela Letcheva	Shooting	F	1988, 1992	Summer	0	2	0	2
Yoto Yotov	Weightlifting	M	1992, 1996	Summer	0	2	0	2
Petar Merkov	Canoeing	M	2000	Summer	0	2	0	2
Stanka Zlateva	Wrestling	F	2008, 2012	Summer	0	2	0	2
Yordan Yovchev	Gymnastics	M	1992, 1996, 2000, 2004, 2008, 2012	Summer	0	1	3	4
Yordanka Blagoeva	Athletics	F	1972, 1976	Summer	0	1	1	2
Atanas Shopov	Weightlifting	M	1972, 1976	Summer	0	1	1	2
Krasimira Bogdanova	Basketball	F	1976, 1980	Summer	0	1	1	2
Diana Dilova-Braynova	Basketball	F	1976, 1980	Summer	0	1	1	2
Penka Metodieva	Basketball	F	1976, 1980	Summer	0	1	1	2
Snezhana Mikhaylova	Basketball	F	1976, 1980	Summer	0	1	1	2
Petkana Makaveeva	Basketball	F	1976, 1980	Summer	0	1	1	2
Nadka Golcheva	Basketball	F	1976, 1980	Summer	0	1	1	2
Penka Stoyanova	Basketball	F	1976, 1980	Summer	0	1	1	2
Diana Paliiska	Canoeing	F	1988	Summer	0	1	1	2
Antoaneta Frenkeva	Swimming	F	1988	Summer	0	1	1	2
Tsvetanka Khristova	Athletics	F	1988, 1992	Summer	0	1	1	2
Nikolay Peshalov	Weightlifting	M	1992, 1996	Summer	0	1	1	2
Stefan Angelov	Wrestling	M	1972, 1976	Summer	0	0	2	2
Martin Marinov	Canoeing	M	1988, 1992	Summer	0	0	2	2

== Medals by sport and year ==
=== Summer Olympics ===
==== Athletics ====
Games	Gold	Silver	Bronze	Total
(Germany) 1972 Munich	0	2	2	4
(Canada) 1976 Montreal	1	2	1	4
(Soviet Union) 1980 Moscow	0	1	1	2
(South Korea) 1988 Seoul	2	1	1	4
(Spain) 1992 Barcelona	0	1	1	2
(United States) 1996 Atlanta	1	0	0	1
(Australia) 2000 Sydney	1	0	0	1
(Brazil) 2016 Rio de Janeiro	0	1	0	1
Total	5	8	6	19

==== Basketball ====
Games	Gold	Silver	Bronze	Total
(Canada) 1976 Montreal	0	0	1	1
(Soviet Union) 1980 Moscow	0	1	0	1
Total	0	1	1	2

==== Boxing ====
Games	Gold	Silver	Bronze	Total
(Finland) 1952 Helsinki	0	0	1	1
(Japan) 1964 Tokyo	0	0	1	1
1968 Mexico City	0	0	2	2
(Germany) 1972 Munich	1	1	0	2
(Canada) 1976 Montreal	0	0	1	1
(Soviet Union) 1980 Moscow	1	0	1	2
(South Korea) 1988 Seoul	1	1	0	2
(Spain) 1992 Barcelona	0	1	1	2
(United States) 1996 Atlanta	1	2	0	3
(Greece) 2004 Athens	0	0	1	1
(United Kingdom) 2012 London	0	0	1	1
(Japan) 2020 Tokyo	1	0	0	1
(France) 2024 Paris	0	0	1	1
Total	5	5	10	20

==== Canoeing ====
Games	Gold	Silver	Bronze	Total
(Germany) 1972 Munich	0	0	1	1
(Soviet Union) 1980 Moscow	1	2	2	5
(South Korea) 1988 Seoul	1	1	3	5
(Spain) 1992 Barcelona	2	0	1	3
(United States) 1996 Atlanta	0	0	1	1
(Australia) 2000 Sydney	0	2	0	2
Total	4	5	8	17

==== Equestrian ====
Games	Gold	Silver	Bronze	Total
(Soviet Union) 1980 Moscow	0	1	0	1
Total	0	1	0	1

==== Football ====
Games	Gold	Silver	Bronze	Total
(Australia) 1956 Melbourne	0	0	1	1
1968 Mexico City	0	1	0	1
Total	0	1	1	2

==== Gymnastics ====
Games	Gold	Silver	Bronze	Total
(Italy) 1960 Rome	0	0	1	1
(Soviet Union) 1980 Moscow	1	0	1	2
(South Korea) 1988 Seoul	1	1	1	3
(United States) 1996 Atlanta	0	2	0	2
(Australia) 2000 Sydney	0	0	2	2
(Greece) 2004 Athens	0	1	2	3
(Brazil) 2016 Rio de Janeiro	0	0	1	1
(Japan) 2020 Tokyo	1	0	0	1
(France) 2024 Paris	0	1	0	1
Total	3	5	8	16

==== Judo ====
Games	Gold	Silver	Bronze	Total
(Soviet Union) 1980 Moscow	0	1	1	2
(Greece) 2004 Athens	0	0	1	1
Total	0	1	2	3

==== Karate ====
Games	Gold	Silver	Bronze	Total
(Japan) 2020 Tokyo	1	0	0	1
Total	1	0	0	1

==== Rowing ====
Games	Gold	Silver	Bronze	Total
(Canada) 1976 Montreal	2	1	0	3
(Soviet Union) 1980 Moscow	0	1	3	4
(South Korea) 1988 Seoul	0	1	2	3
(Australia) 2000 Sydney	0	1	0	1
(Greece) 2004 Athens	0	0	2	2
(China) 2008 Beijing	1	0	0	0
Total	3	4	7	14

==== Shooting ====
Games	Gold	Silver	Bronze	Total
(Japan) 1964 Tokyo	0	1	0	1
(Soviet Union) 1980 Moscow	0	0	2	2
(South Korea) 1988 Seoul	1	1	0	2
(Spain) 1992 Barcelona	0	2	1	3
(United States) 1996 Atlanta	0	2	2	2
(Australia) 2000 Sydney	2	0	0	2
(Greece) 2004 Athens	1	0	1	2
(Japan) 2020 Tokyo	0	1	0	1
Total	4	7	6	17

==== Swimming ====
Games	Gold	Silver	Bronze	Total
(South Korea) 1988 Seoul	1	1	1	3
Total	1	1	1	3

==== Taekwondo ====
Games	Gold	Silver	Bronze	Total
(France) 2024 Paris	0	0	1	1
Total	0	0	1	1

==== Tennis ====
Games	Gold	Silver	Bronze	Total
(South Korea) 1988 Seoul	0	0	1	1
Total	0	0	1	1

==== Volleyball ====
Games	Gold	Silver	Bronze	Total
(Soviet Union) 1980 Moscow	0	1	1	2
Total	0	1	1	2

==== Weightlifting ====
Games	Gold	Silver	Bronze	Total
(Germany) 1972 Munich	3	3	0	6
(Canada) 1976 Montreal	2	3	1	6
(Soviet Union) 1980 Moscow	2	4	2	8
(South Korea) 1988 Seoul	2	1	1	4
(Spain) 1992 Barcelona	1	2	1	4
(United States) 1996 Atlanta	0	1	2	3
(Australia) 2000 Sydney	1	2	0	3
(Greece) 2004 Athens	1	0	1	2
(United Kingdom) 2012 London	0	1	0	1
(France) 2024 Paris	1	0	1	2
Total	13	17	9	39

==== Wrestling ====
Games	Gold	Silver	Bronze	Total
(Australia) 1956 Melbourne	1	3	0	4
(Italy) 1960 Rome	1	3	2	6
(Japan) 1964 Tokyo	3	4	1	8
1968 Mexico City	2	3	1	6
(Germany) 1972 Munich	2	4	2	8
(Canada) 1976 Montreal	1	3	3	7
(Soviet Union) 1980 Moscow	3	4	3	10
(South Korea) 1988 Seoul	1	4	3	8
(Spain) 1992 Barcelona	0	1	1	2
(United States) 1996 Atlanta	1	0	0	1
(Australia) 2000 Sydney	1	1	0	2
(Greece) 2004 Athens	0	0	1	1
(China) 2008 Beijing	0	1	3	4
(United Kingdom) 2012 London	0	1	0	1
(Brazil) 2016 Rio de Janeiro	0	0	1	1
(Japan) 2020 Tokyo	0	0	2	2
(France) 2024 Paris	2	0	0	2
Total	18	32	23	73

=== Winter Olympics ===
==== Biathlon ====
Games	Gold	Silver	Bronze	Total
(Japan) 1998 Nagano	1	0	0	1
(United States) 2002 Salt Lake City	0	0	1	1
(Italy) 2026 Milano Cortina	0	0	1	1
Total	1	0	2	3

==== Cross-country skiing ====
Games	Gold	Silver	Bronze	Total
(United States) 1980 Lake Placid	0	0	1	1
Total	0	0	1	1

==== Short track speed skating ====
Games	Gold	Silver	Bronze	Total
(United States) 2002 Salt Lake City	0	1	1	2
(Italy) 2006 Turin	0	1	0	1
Total	0	2	1	3

==== Snowboarding ====
Games	Gold	Silver	Bronze	Total
(Italy) 2026 Milano Cortina	0	0	1	1
Total	0	0	1	1

== Bulgarian Olympic Flag Bearers ==
#	Year	Season	(Bulgaria) Flag Bearer	Sport
34	2026	Winter	Alexandra Feigin; Vladimir Iliev	Figure skating Biathlon
33	2024	Summer	Stanimira Petrova; Lyubomir Epitropov	Boxing; Swimming
32	2022	Winter	Maria Zdravkova; Radoslav Yankov	Biathlon; Snowboarding
31	2020	Summer	Mariya Grozdeva; Josif Miladinov	Shooting; Swimming
30	2018	Winter	Radoslav Yankov	Snowboarding
29	2016	Summer	Ivet Lalova	Athletics
28	2014	Winter	Maria Kirkova	Alpine skiing
27	2012	Summer	Yordan Yovchev	Gymnastics
26	2010	Winter	Aleksandra Zhekova	Snowboarding
25	2008	Summer	Petar Stoychev	Swimming
24	2006	Winter	Ekaterina Dafovska	Biathlon
23	2004	Summer	Mariya Grozdeva	Shooting
22	2002	Winter	Stefan Georgiev	Alpine skiing
21	2000	Summer	Ivo Yanakiev	Rowing
20	1998	Winter	Lyubomir Popov	Alpine skiing
19	1996	Summer	Dimo Tonev	Volleyball
18	1994	Winter	Nadezhda Aleksieva	Biathlon
17	1992	Summer	Ivaylo Yordanov	Wrestling
16	1992	Winter	Iva Karagiozova-Shkodreva	Biathlon
15	1988	Summer	Vasil Etropolski	Fencing
14	1988	Winter	Vladimir Velichkov	Biathlon
13	1984	Winter	Vladimir Velichkov	Biathlon
12	1980	Summer	Aleksandar Tomov	Wrestling
11	1980	Winter	Petar Popangelov	Downhill skiing
10	1976	Summer	Aleksandar Tomov	Wrestling
9	1972	Summer	Dimitar Zlatanov	Volleyball
8	1968	Summer	Prodan Gardzhev	Wrestling
7	1964	Summer	Enyu Valchev	Wrestling
6	1960	Summer	Georgi Panov	Basketball
5	1956	Summer	Georgi Panov	Basketball
4	1952	Summer	Boris Nikolov	Boxing
3	1936	Summer	Lyuben Doychev	Athletics
2	1928	Summer	Todor Semov	Equestrian
1	1924	Summer	Kiril Petrunov	Athletics

== See also ==
- List of flag bearers for Bulgaria at the Olympics
- Category:Olympic competitors for Bulgaria
- Bulgaria at the Paralympics
