= Volleyball at the 1980 Summer Olympics – Men's tournament =

Men's volleyball at the Games of the XXII Olympiad
- Venue: Minor Arena of the Central Lenin Stadium and Druzhba Multipurpose Arena
- Date: 20 July – 1 August
- Competitors: 113 from 10 nations

Medalists
1st place, gold medalist(s)		Soviet Union (3rd title)
2nd place, silver medalist(s)		Bulgaria
3rd place, bronze medalist(s)		Romania

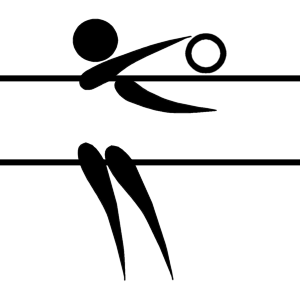

The men's tournament in Volleyball at the 1980 Summer Olympics was the 5th edition of the event at the Summer Olympics, organized by the world's governing body, the FIVB in conjunction with the IOC. It was held in Moscow, Soviet Union from 20 July to 1 August 1980.

== Qualification ==
Means of qualification	Date	Host	Vacancies	Qualified
Host Country	23 October 1974	(Austria) Vienna	1	Soviet Union
1976 Olympic Games	18–30 July 1976	(Canada) Montreal	1	Poland
1978 World Championship	20 September – 1 October 1978	Italy	1	Italy
1979 African Championship	November 1979	(Libya) Tripoli	1	~~Tunisia~~; Libya*
1979 Asian Championship	16–23 December 1979	(Bahrain) Manama	1	~~China~~; Czechoslovakia*
1979 European Championship	5–13 October 1979	France	1	Yugoslavia
1979 NORCECA Championship	21–28 April 1979	(Cuba) Havana	1	Cuba
1979 South American Championship	21–26 April 1979	Argentina	1	Brazil
World Qualifier	20–27 January 1980	Bulgaria	2	Bulgaria
World Qualifier	20–27 January 1980	Bulgaria	2	Romania
Total			10	

* Tunisia and China withdrew because of the US-led boycott and were replaced by Libya and Czechoslovakia respectively.

== Pools composition ==
Pool A	Pool B
Soviet Union (Hosts)	Poland
Czechoslovakia	Brazil
Romania	Bulgaria
Cuba	Yugoslavia
Italy	Libya

== Venues ==
Main venue	Sub venue
Moscow, Soviet Union	Moscow, Soviet Union
Minor Arena of the Central Lenin Stadium	Druzhba Multipurpose Arena
Capacity: 8,700	Capacity: 3,500

== Preliminary round ==
=== Pool A ===
Pos	Team	Pld	W	L	Pts	SW	SL	SR	SPW	SPL	SPR	Qualification
1	Soviet Union	4	4	0	8	12	1	12.000	193	122	1.582	Semifinals
2	Bulgaria	4	3	1	7	9	5	1.800	171	149	1.148	Semifinals
3	Cuba	4	1	3	5	6	9	0.667	181	178	1.017	5th–8th semifinals
4	Czechoslovakia	4	1	3	5	6	11	0.545	180	230	0.783	5th–8th semifinals
5	Italy	4	1	3	5	4	11	0.364	145	191	0.759	9th place match

Date	Venue		Score		Set 1	Set 2	Set 3	Set 4	Set 5	Total
20 Jul	DMA	Cuba	3–0	Italy	15–7	15–8	15–6			45–21
20 Jul	MAC	Soviet Union	3–1	Czechoslovakia	15–13	15–10	13–15	15–7		58–45
22 Jul	DMA	Italy	3–2	Czechoslovakia	8–15	15–5	10–15	15–8	15–7	63–50
22 Jul	MAC	Bulgaria	3–1	Cuba	15–7	15–8	6–15	15–8		51–38
24 Jul	DMA	Bulgaria	3–0	Czechoslovakia	15–12	15–5	15–7			45–24
24 Jul	MAC	Soviet Union	3–0	Italy	15–2	15–7	15–10			45–19
26 Jul	MAC	Czechoslovakia	3–2	Cuba	15–11	13–15	2–15	16–14	15–9	61–64
26 Jul	MAC	Soviet Union	3–0	Bulgaria	15–6	15–8	15–10			45–24
28 Jul	MAC	Bulgaria	3–1	Italy	15–9	15–9	6–15	15–9		51–42
28 Jul	MAC	Soviet Union	3–0	Cuba	15–10	15–13	15–11			45–34

=== Pool B ===
Pos	Team	Pld	W	L	Pts	SW	SL	SR	SPW	SPL	SPR	Qualification
1	Poland	4	3	1	7	11	5	2.200	221	172	1.285	Semifinals
2	Romania	4	3	1	7	10	5	2.000	215	138	1.558	Semifinals
3	Brazil	4	2	2	6	9	8	1.125	215	196	1.097	5th–8th semifinals
4	Yugoslavia	4	2	2	6	8	8	1.000	189	177	1.068	5th–8th semifinals
5	Libya	4	0	4	4	0	12	0.000	23	180	0.128	9th place match

Date	Venue		Score		Set 1	Set 2	Set 3	Set 4	Set 5	Total
20 Jul	DMA	Romania	3–0	Libya	15–3	15–1	15–1			45–5
20 Jul	MAC	Poland	3–1	Yugoslavia	15–11	11–15	15–3	15–7		56–36
22 Jul	DMA	Yugoslavia	3–2	Brazil	8–15	15–12	10–15	15–4	15–12	63–58
22 Jul	MAC	Poland	3–1	Romania	9–15	15–12	15–13	15–13		54–53
24 Jul	DMA	Poland	3–0	Libya	15–1	15–3	15–1			45–5
24 Jul	MAC	Romania	3–1	Brazil	13–15	15–4	15–12	15–3		58–34
26 Jul	DMA	Brazil	3–0	Libya	15–1	15–2	15–6			45–9
26 Jul	DMA	Romania	3–1	Yugoslavia	15–9	14–16	15–8	15–12		59–45
28 Jul	DMA	Brazil	3–2	Poland	13–15	18–20	17–15	15–11	15–5	78–66
28 Jul	DMA	Yugoslavia	3–0	Libya	15–2	15–1	15–1			45–4

== Final round ==
=== 9th–10th places ===
==== 9th place match ====
Date	Venue		Score		Set 1	Set 2	Set 3	Set 4	Set 5	Total
30 Jul	DMA	Italy	3–0	Libya	15–2	15–1	15–4			45–7

=== 5th–8th places ===
5th–8th semifinals
30 July
Cuba	2
Yugoslavia	3
30 July
Czechoslovakia	0
Brazil	3

5th place match
1 August
Yugoslavia	2
Brazil	3
7th place match
1 August
Cuba	3
Czechoslovakia	1

==== 5th–8th semifinals ====
Date	Venue		Score		Set 1	Set 2	Set 3	Set 4	Set 5	Total
30 Jul	DMA	Czechoslovakia	0–3	Brazil	14–16	11–15	9–15			34–46
30 Jul	DMA	Cuba	2–3	Yugoslavia	15–12	15–5	12–15	14–16	2–15	58–63

==== 7th place match ====
Date	Venue		Score		Set 1	Set 2	Set 3	Set 4	Set 5	Total
1 Aug	DMA	Cuba	3–1	Czechoslovakia	14–16	15–7	15–10	15–6		59–39

==== 5th place match ====
Date	Venue		Score		Set 1	Set 2	Set 3	Set 4	Set 5	Total
1 Aug	DMA	Yugoslavia	2–3	Brazil	16–14	9–15	15–8	10–15	8–15	58–67

=== Final four ===
Semifinals
30 July
Soviet Union	3
Romania	0
30 July
Bulgaria	3
Poland	0

Gold medal match
1 August
Soviet Union	3
Bulgaria	1
Bronze medal match
1 August
Romania	3
Poland	1

==== Semifinals ====
Date	Venue		Score		Set 1	Set 2	Set 3	Set 4	Set 5	Total
30 Jul	MAC	Bulgaria	3–0	Poland	15–13	15–13	15–7			45–33
30 Jul	MAC	Soviet Union	3–0	Romania	15–6	15–10	15–5			45–21

==== Bronze medal match ====
Date	Venue		Score		Set 1	Set 2	Set 3	Set 4	Set 5	Total
1 Aug	MAC	Romania	3–1	Poland	15–10	9–15	15–13	15–9		54–47

==== Gold medal match ====
Date	Venue		Score		Set 1	Set 2	Set 3	Set 4	Set 5	Total
1 Aug	MAC	Soviet Union	3–1	Bulgaria	15–7	15–13	14–16	15–11		59–47

== Final standing ==
Rank	Team
1st place, gold medalist(s)	Soviet Union
2nd place, silver medalist(s)	Bulgaria
3rd place, bronze medalist(s)	Romania
4	Poland
5	Brazil
6	Yugoslavia
7	Cuba
8	Czechoslovakia
9	Italy
10	Libya

1980 Men's Olympic champions

Soviet Union
3rd title

12–man Roster
Yuriy Panchenko, Vyacheslav Zaytsev, Aleksandr Borisovich Savin, Vladimir Dorokhov, Aleksandr Ermilov, Pāvels Seļivanovs, Oleg Moliboga, Vladimir Kondra, Vladimir Chernyshov, Fedir Lashchonov, Valeriy Kryvov, Viljar Loor
Head coach
Viacheslav Platonov

== Medalists ==
Gold	Silver	Bronze
Soviet Union Yuriy Panchenko; Vyacheslav Zaytsev; Aleksandr Savin; Vladimir Dorokhov; Aleksandr Ermilov; Pāvels Seļivanovs; Oleg Moliboga; Vladimir Kondra; Vladimir Chernyshov; Fedir Lashchonov; Valeriy Kryvov; Viljar Loor Head coach: Viacheslav Platonov	Bulgaria Stoyan Gunchev; Hristo Stoyanov; Dimitar Zlatanov; Dimitar Dimitrov; Tsano Tsanov; Stefan Dimitrov; Petko Petkov; Mitko Todorov; Kaspar Simeonov; Emil Valtchev; Hristo Iliev; Yordan Angelov Head coach: Todor Piterkov	Romania Corneliu Oros; Laurenţiu Dumănoiu; Dan Gîrleanu; Nicu Stoian; Sorin Macavei; Constantin Sterea; Nicolae Pop; Günther Enescu; Valter Chifu; Marius Căta-Chiţiga; Florin Mina; Viorel Manole Head coach: Nicolae Sotir
