= Levski Volley =

Volleyball team from Sofia, Bulgaria

VC Levski Sofia
- Full name: Волейболен Клуб Левски София; Volleyball Club Levski Sofia
- Nickname: Сините (The Blues)
- Founded: 1943
- Ground: Levski Sofia Sports Hall, Sofia (Capacity: 1,724)
- Chairman: (Bulgaria) Vladimir Nikolov
- Manager: (Bulgaria) Nikolay Jeliazkov
- League: Bulgarian Volleyball Super League
- 2023–24: Champion (Men)
- Website: Club home page

Uniforms
Home	Away

VC Levski Sofia (Bulgarian: ВК Левски София) is a professional Bulgarian volleyball team based in Sofia. It has both men's and women's teams, both playing in its respective Bulgarian Volleyball Leagues. Founded in 1943, the team plays its home games at Levski Sofia Sports Hall in Sofia. The women's team became the first Bulgarian volleyball club to be crowned European champion in the 1963–64 season. Levski is also the only Bulgarian club to have reached the European Cup finals four times, and the CEV Cup finals six times.

== Men's Volleyball ==
=== Honours ===
==== National competitions ====
- NVL: 18

1945, 1959, 1980, 1985, 1992, 1997, 1999, 2000, 2001, 2002, 2003, 2004, 2005, 2006, 2009, 2024, 2025. 2026

- Bulgarian Cup: 18

1960, 1966, 1968, 1972, 1980, 1983, 1987, 1989, 1996, 1997, 2000, 2001, 2003, 2004, 2006, 2012, 2014, 2025

- Bulgarian Super Cup: 4

2023, 2024, 2025, 2026

==== International competitions ====
- CEV Cup Runners-up: 1975, 1979, 1982, 1985, 1987, 1989
- CEV Champions League Third place: 1960

=== Team roster – season 2022/2023 ===
No.	Name	Date of birth	Position
1	(Bulgaria) Simeon Nikolov	November 24, 2006 (age 19)	setter
3	(Bulgaria) Lazar Buchkov	May 12, 2004 (age 22)	middle blocker
4	(Argentina) Alejandro Toro	July 20, 1989 (age 37)	outside hitter
5	(Bulgaria) Svetoslav Gotsev	August 31, 1990 (age 36)	middle blocker
6	(Australia) Igor Yudin	June 17, 1987 (age 39)	outside hitter
7	(Bulgaria) Konstantin Chipev	February 6, 2006 (age 20)	libero
9	(Bulgaria) Vladimir Garkov	October 2, 2003 (age 23)	outside hitter
10	(Bulgaria) Stoil Palev	May 21, 2003 (age 23)	setter
13	(Bulgaria) Aleksandar Kandev	February 17, 2005 (age 21)	outside hitter
15	(Bulgaria) Kaloyan Botev	October 28, 2004 (age 21)	libero
16	(Bulgaria) Vladislav Ivanov	March 14, 1987 (age 39)	libero
17	(Bulgaria) Nikolay Zahariev	March 18, 2001 (age 25)	middle blocker
18	(Bulgaria) Venislav Antov	April 6, 2004 (age 22)	opposite spiker
19	(Bulgaria) Kostadin Kozelov	July 4, 2005 (age 21)	middle blocker
22	(Bulgaria) Kaloyan Valchinov	August 16, 2004 (age 22)	opposite spiker
Head coach: (Bulgaria) Nikolay Jeliazkov; Assistant: (Bulgaria) Hristo Tsvetanov

=== Notable players ===
Players internationally capped for Bulgaria and Russia

- (Bulgaria) Hristo Iliev
- (Bulgaria) Mitko Todorov
- (Bulgaria) Hristo Stoyanov
- (Bulgaria) Yordan Angelov
- (Bulgaria) Plamen Konstantinov
- (Russia) Vladimir Alekno
- (Bulgaria) Vladimir Nikolov
- (Bulgaria) Hristo Tsvetanov
- (Bulgaria) Andrey Zhekov
- (Bulgaria) Boyan Yordanov
- (Bulgaria) Krasimir Gaydarski
- (Bulgaria) Metodi Ananiev
- (Bulgaria) Todor Aleksiev
- (Bulgaria) Martin Stoev
- (Bulgaria) Nikolay Uchikov
- (Bulgaria) Valentin Bratoev
- (Bulgaria) Georgi Bratoev
- (Bulgaria) Vladislav Ivanov
- (Bulgaria) Aleksandar Nikolov
- (Bulgaria) Simeon Nikolov

== Women's Volleyball ==
=== Honours ===
==== National competitions ====
- NVL: 28 (record)

1959, 1962, 1963, 1964, 1965, 1966, 1967, 1970, 1971, 1972, 1973, 1974, 1975, 1976, 1977, 1980, 1981, 1984, 1990, 1996, 1997, 1998, 1999, 2001, 2002, 2003, 2009, 2014

- Bulgarian Cup: 27 (record)

1959, 1960, 1961, 1966, 1967, 1970, 1972, 1973, 1974, 1978, 1980, 1987, 1990, 1991, 1992, 1994, 1997, 1998, 1999, 2001, 2002, 2003, 2005, 2006, 2009, 2014, 2016

==== International competitions ====
- CEV Champions League: 1

1963–64

- Runners-up: 1975, 1976, 1981

=== Notable players ===
Players internationally capped for Bulgaria

- (Bulgaria) Tanya Gogova
- (Bulgaria) Galina Stancheva
- (Bulgaria) Tanya Dimitrova
- (Bulgaria) Silviya Petrunova
- (Bulgaria) Rositsa Dimitrova

=== Team squad ===
Season 2016–2017, as of January 2017.

Number	Player	Position	Height (m)	Weight (kg)	Birth date
1	(Bulgaria) Nadezhda Petrova	Libero	1.73	83	22 May 1999 (age 27)
2	(Bulgaria) Desislava Georgieva	Middle blocker	1.85	70	11 June 1998 (age 28)
3	(Bulgaria) Kristiana Petrova	Outside hitter	1.81	70	13 July 1997 (age 29)
4	(Bulgaria) Zornitsa Yaneva	Middle blocker	1.82	61	2 September 1999 (age 27)
5	(Bulgaria) Maria Yordanova	Opposite	1.82	72	25 May 2002 (age 24)
6	(Bulgaria) Miroslava Paskova	Outside hitter	1.78	70	16 February 1996 (age 30)
7	(Bulgaria) Iva Nikolova	Outside hitter	1.82	65	13 June 1999 (age 27)
8	(Bulgaria) Mariana Yordanova	Setter	1.83	78	27 November 1999 (age 26)
9	(Bulgaria) Elena Becheva	Outside hitter	1.83	69	30 May 1998 (age 28)
10	(Bulgaria) Gergana Becheva	Setter	1.77	63	4 May 2000 (age 26)
11	(Bulgaria) Kathryn Dimitrova	Opposite	1.90	77	27 November 1999 (age 26)
12	(Bulgaria) Viktoriya Ivanova	Libero	1.69	60	23 May 2000 (age 26)
13	(Bulgaria) Denitsa Dimitrova	Middle blocker	1.88	75	23 March 1999 (age 27)
14	(Bulgaria) Mariela Gerenova	Libero	1.66	58	20 April 2000 (age 26)
15	(Bulgaria) Gergana Georgieva	Setter	1.77	60	15 October 1998 (age 28)
16	(Bulgaria) Anelia Dzhondrova	Middle blocker	1.93	84	18 December 1999 (age 26)
17	(Bulgaria) Monika Krasteva	Outside hitter	1.80	68	9 May 1999 (age 27)
18	(Bulgaria) Nasya Dimitrova	Middle blocker	1.89	70	6 November 1992 (age 33)
Coach: (Bulgaria) Radoslav Bakardzhiev
