= 1981 Women's European Volleyball Championship =

Tournament details
- Host country: Bulgaria
- Dates: 19 – 27 September
- Teams: 12
- Venue: Various (in 2 host cities)

Final positions
- Champions: Bulgaria (1st title)

The 1981 Women's European Volleyball Championship was the twelfth edition of the event, organised by Europe's governing volleyball body, the Confédération Européenne de Volleyball. It was hosted in several cities in Bulgaria from 19 to 27 September 1981, with the final round held in Sofia.

== Participating teams ==
- Bulgaria
- Czechoslovakia
- East Germany
- Hungary
- Italy
- Netherlands
- Poland
- Romania
- Soviet Union
- Turkey
- West Germany
- Yugoslavia

== Format ==
The tournament was played in two different stages. In the first stage, the twelve participants were divided into three groups of four teams each. In the second stage, two groups were formed, one containing the winners and runners-up from all first stage groups (six teams in total) to contest the tournament title. A second group was formed by the remaining six teams which played for position places (7th to 12th). All groups in both stages played a single round-robin format.

== Pools composition ==
Pool 1	Pool 2	Pool 3
Czechoslovakia	East Germany	Bulgaria
Romania	Italy	Hungary
Soviet Union	Netherlands	Turkey
Yugoslavia	Poland	West Germany

== Venues ==
Pool 1 and 7th–12th pool	Pools 2, 3 and Final Pool	Tournament host cities
Pernik	Sofia	Tournament host cities

== Preliminary round ==
=== Pool 1 ===
- venue location: Pernik, Bulgaria

Pos	Team	Pld	W	L	Pts	SW	SL	SR	SPW	SPL	SPR	Qualification
1	Soviet Union	3	3	0	6	9	0	MAX	135	57	2.368	Final pool
2	Czechoslovakia	3	2	1	5	6	4	1.500	124	125	0.992	Final pool
3	Romania	3	1	2	4	4	6	0.667	117	126	0.929	7th–12th pool
4	Yugoslavia	3	0	3	3	0	9	0.000	69	137	0.504	7th–12th pool

Date		Score		Set 1	Set 2	Set 3	Set 4	Set 5	Total	Report
19 Sep	Yugoslavia	0–3	Romania	6–15	4–15	13–15			23–45	Report
19 Sep	Soviet Union	3–0	Czechoslovakia	15–3	15–9	15–7			45–19	Report
20 Sep	Yugoslavia	0–3	Soviet Union	3–15	4–15	3–15			10–45	Report
20 Sep	Czechoslovakia	3–1	Romania	16–14	15–10	12–15	15–5		58–44	Report
21 Sep	Yugoslavia	0–3	Czechoslovakia	15–17	12–15	9–15			36–47	Report
21 Sep	Soviet Union	3–0	Romania	15–9	15–13	15–6			45–28	Report

=== Pool 2 ===
- venue location: Sofia, Bulgaria

Pos	Team	Pld	W	L	Pts	SW	SL	SR	SPW	SPL	SPR	Qualification
1	East Germany	3	3	0	6	9	4	2.250	171	155	1.103	Final pool
2	Poland	3	2	1	5	6	4	1.500	136	104	1.308	Final pool
3	Italy	3	1	2	4	5	6	0.833	133	131	1.015	7th–12th pool
4	Netherlands	3	0	3	3	3	9	0.333	114	164	0.695	7th–12th pool

Date		Score		Set 1	Set 2	Set 3	Set 4	Set 5	Total	Report
19 Sep	Poland	3–1	Netherlands	15–12	15–3	13–15	15–2		58–32	Report
19 Sep	East Germany	3–2	Italy	14–16	15–13	6–15	15–9	15–8	65–61	Report
20 Sep	East Germany	3–2	Netherlands	10–15	15–7	6–15	15–13	15–11	61–61	Report
20 Sep	Poland	3–0	Italy	15–12	15–5	15–10			45–27	Report
21 Sep	Italy	3–0	Netherlands	15–9	15–8	15–4			45–21	Report
21 Sep	East Germany	3–0	Poland	15–11	15–13	15–9			45–33	Report

=== Pool 3 ===
- venue location: Sofia, Bulgaria

Pos	Team	Pld	W	L	Pts	SW	SL	SR	SPW	SPL	SPR	Qualification
1	Bulgaria	3	3	0	6	9	2	4.500	155	101	1.535	Final pool
2	Hungary	3	2	1	5	8	3	2.667	148	98	1.510	Final pool
3	West Germany	3	1	2	4	3	6	0.500	96	111	0.865	7th–12th pool
4	Turkey	3	0	3	3	0	9	0.000	46	135	0.341	7th–12th pool

Date		Score		Set 1	Set 2	Set 3	Set 4	Set 5	Total	Report
19 Sep	Hungary	3–0	Turkey	15–2	15–3	15–4			45–9	Report
19 Sep	Bulgaria	3–0	West Germany	15–4	16–14	15–8			46–26	Report
20 Sep	Bulgaria	3–0	Turkey	15–4	15–9	15–4			45–17	Report
20 Sep	Hungary	3–0	West Germany	15–4	15–10	15–11			45–25	Report
21 Sep	West Germany	3–0	Turkey	15–10	15–9	15–1			45–20	Report
21 Sep	Bulgaria	3–2	Hungary	15–13	6–15	13–15	15–5	15–10	64–58	Report

== Final round ==
=== 7th–12th pool ===
- venue location: Pernik, Bulgaria

Pos	Team	Pld	W	L	Pts	SW	SL	SR	SPW	SPL	SPR
1	Romania	5	5	0	10	15	0	MAX	225	99	2.273
2	Italy	5	4	1	9	12	4	3.000	217	154	1.409
3	Netherlands	5	3	2	8	9	9	1.000	194	212	0.915
4	West Germany	5	2	3	7	8	11	0.727	233	232	1.004
5	Yugoslavia	5	1	4	6	6	12	0.500	177	249	0.711
6	Turkey	5	0	5	5	1	15	0.067	135	235	0.574

Date		Score		Set 1	Set 2	Set 3	Set 4	Set 5	Total	Report
23 Sep	Yugoslavia	0–3	Romania	6–15	4–15	13–15			23–45	Report
23 Sep	Italy	3–0	Netherlands	15–9	15–8	15–4			45–21	Report
23 Sep	West Germany	3–0	Turkey	15–10	15–9	15–1			45–20	Report
24 Sep	Yugoslavia	3–0	Turkey	19–17	15–10	15–2			49–29	Report
24 Sep	Netherlands	3–2	West Germany	10–15	8–15	15–10	15–11	15–10	63–61	Report
24 Sep	Romania	3–0	Italy	15–11	15–6	15–5			45–22	Report
25 Sep	Yugoslavia	2–3	West Germany	16–14	11–15	15–13	8–15	7–15	57–72	Report
25 Sep	Italy	3–0	Turkey	15–3	15–10	15–5			45–18	Report
25 Sep	Romania	3–0	Netherlands	15–8	15–3	15–3			45–14	Report
26 Sep	Yugoslavia	0–3	Netherlands	9–15	2–15	7–15			18–45	Report
26 Sep	Romania	3–0	Turkey	15–6	15–13	15–6			45–25	Report
26 Sep	Italy	3–0	West Germany	15–13	15–12	17–15			47–40	Report
27 Sep	Yugoslavia	1–3	Italy	3–15	15–13	6–15	6–15		30–58	Report
27 Sep	Netherlands	3–1	Turkey	6–15	15–12	15–5	15–11		51–43	Report
27 Sep	Romania	3–0	West Germany	15–4	15–9	15–2			45–15	Report

=== Final pool ===
- venue location: Sofia, Bulgaria

Pos	Team	Pld	W	L	Pts	SW	SL	SR	SPW	SPL	SPR
1	Bulgaria	5	5	0	10	15	4	3.750	265	161	1.646
2	Soviet Union	5	4	1	9	12	5	2.400	228	169	1.349
3	Hungary	5	3	2	8	13	8	1.625	263	215	1.223
4	East Germany	5	2	3	7	7	10	0.700	170	232	0.733
5	Poland	5	1	4	6	4	14	0.286	192	252	0.762
6	Czechoslovakia	5	0	5	5	5	15	0.333	191	280	0.682

Date		Score		Set 1	Set 2	Set 3	Set 4	Set 5	Total	Report
23 Sep	Soviet Union	3–0	Czechoslovakia	15–3	15–9	15–7			45–19	Report
23 Sep	East Germany	3–0	Poland	15–11	15–13	15–9			45–33	Report
23 Sep	Bulgaria	3–2	Hungary	15–13	6–15	13–15	15–5	15–10	64–58	Report
24 Sep	Hungary	3–1	Czechoslovakia	15–3	11–15	15–7	15–5		56–30	Report
24 Sep	Bulgaria	3–0	Poland	15–6	15–10	15–5			45–21	Report
24 Sep	Soviet Union	3–0	East Germany	15–7	15–10	15–7			45–24	Report
25 Sep	Soviet Union	3–0	Poland	15–10	15–7	17–15			47–32	Report
25 Sep	Hungary	3–0	East Germany	15–7	15–10	15–2			45–19	Report
25 Sep	Bulgaria	3–1	Czechoslovakia	10–15	15–3	15–2	15–9		55–29	Report
26 Sep	Poland	3–2	Czechoslovakia	15–8	15–12	11–15	8–15	15–10	64–60	Report
26 Sep	Bulgaria	3–1	East Germany	15–3	15–0	11–15	15–4		56–22	Report
26 Sep	Soviet Union	3–2	Hungary	15–12	8–15	15–0	7–15	15–7	60–49	Report
27 Sep	Hungary	3–1	Poland	15–10	10–15	15–10	15–7		55–42	Report
27 Sep	East Germany	3–1	Czechoslovakia	13–15	17–15	15–12	15–11		60–53	Report
27 Sep	Bulgaria	3–0	Soviet Union	15–6	15–13	15–12			45–31	Report

== Final ranking ==
Place	Team
1st place, gold medalist(s)	Bulgaria
2nd place, silver medalist(s)	Soviet Union
3rd place, bronze medalist(s)	Hungary
4.	East Germany
5.	Poland
6.	Czechoslovakia
7.	Romania
8.	Italy
9.	Netherlands
10.	West Germany
11.	Yugoslavia
12.	Turkey

1981 Women's European champions

Bulgaria
First title

Team Roster
Tanya Gogova, Verka Borisova, Maya Georgieva, Rumyana Kaisheva, Tsvetana Bozhurina, Anka Khristolova, Rositsa Dimitrova, Mila Rangelova, Galina Stancheva, Vanya Manova, Tanya Dimitrova and Zlatka Stoichkova.
Head coach: Vasil Simov.
