= Hristo Iliev =

Hristo Iliev may refer to:

- Hristo Iliev (footballer) (1936–1974), Bulgarian footballer
- Hristo Iliev (volleyball) (born 1951), Bulgarian former volleyball player
- Hristo Iliev Iliev (football president) (born 1982), President of Bulgarian football team Botev Vratsa
- Hristo Iliev (sprinter) (born 2005), Bulgarian sprinter
