= 1963–64 Volleyball Women's European Cup =

The 1963–64 Volleyball Women's European Cup was the fourth edition of the official competition for European women's volleyball national champions. It was contested by ten teams, and ran from 14 December 1963 to 7 March 1964. Levski Sofia defeated defending champion Dynamo Moscow in the semifinals and Dynamo Berlin in the final to become the first non-Soviet team to win the competition.

== Preliminary round ==
Team #1	Agg.	Team #2	1st	2nd
Red Star Belgrade (Socialist Federal Republic of Yugoslavia)	6–2	(Turkey) Galatasaray	3–0	3–2
Slovan-Olympia Wien (Austria)	0–6	(Czech Republic) Dynamo Prague	0–3	0–3

== Quarterfinals ==
Team #1	Agg.	Team #2	1st	2nd
Dynamo Moscow (Soviet Union)	6–2	(Hungary) Újpest Dósza	3–0	3–2
Levski Sofia (Bulgaria)	6–1	(Socialist Federal Republic of Yugoslavia) Red Star Belgrade	3–0	3–1
Dynamo Berlin (East Germany)	6–1	(Czech Republic) Dynamo Prague	3–0	3–1
AZS Warsaw (Poland)	?–?	(France) Tourcoing Sports	?–?	3–0

== Semifinals ==
Team #1	Agg.	Team #2	1st	2nd
Dynamo Moscow (Soviet Union)	3–3	(Bulgaria) Levski Sofia	3–0	0–3
Dynamo Berlin (East Germany)	4–3	(Poland) AZS Warsaw	3–0	1–3

== Final ==
Team #1	Agg.	Team #2	1st	2nd
Levski Sofia (Bulgaria)	4–3	(East Germany) Dynamo Berlin	3–0	1–3

Women's Volleyball European Cup
1963–64 Champions
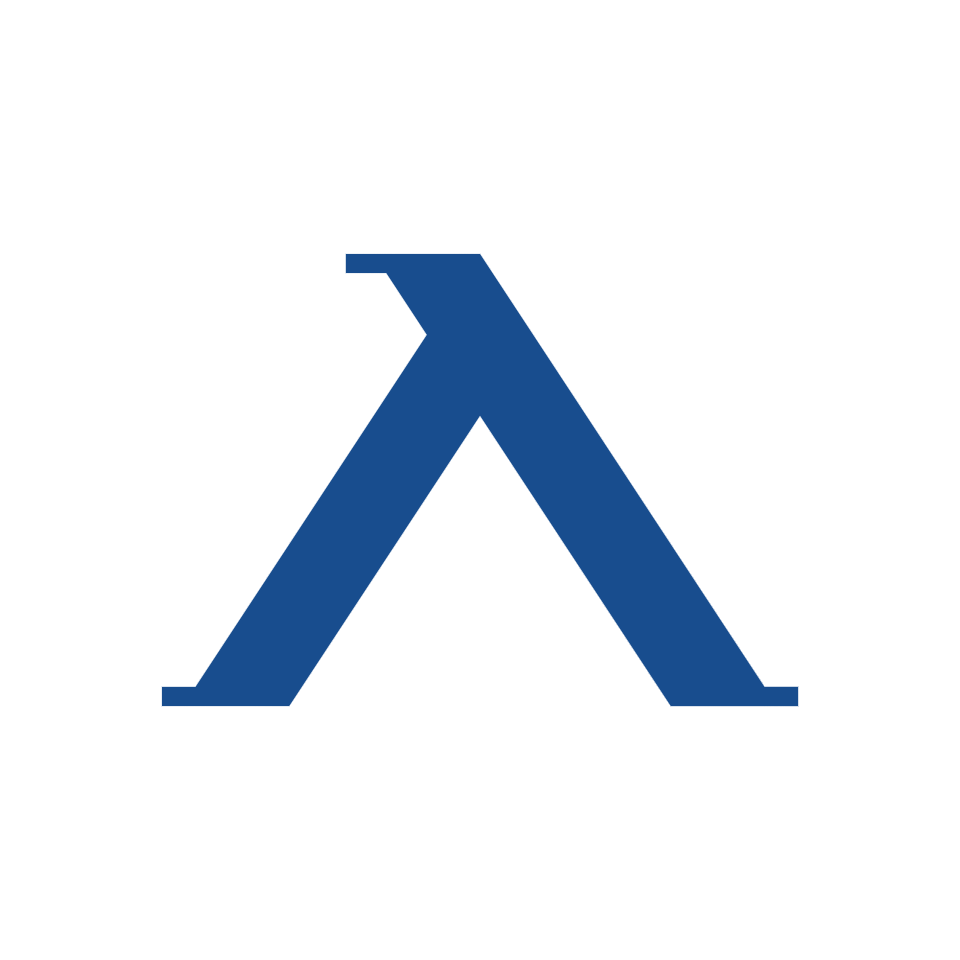
(Bulgaria) Levski Sofia
First title
