= Volleyball at the 1980 Summer Olympics =

Volleyball at the Games of the XXII Olympiad
- Venue: Minor Arena of the Central Lenin Stadium and Druzhba Multipurpose Arena
- Dates: 20 July – 1 August 1980
- No. of events: 2
- Competitors: 201 from 13 nations

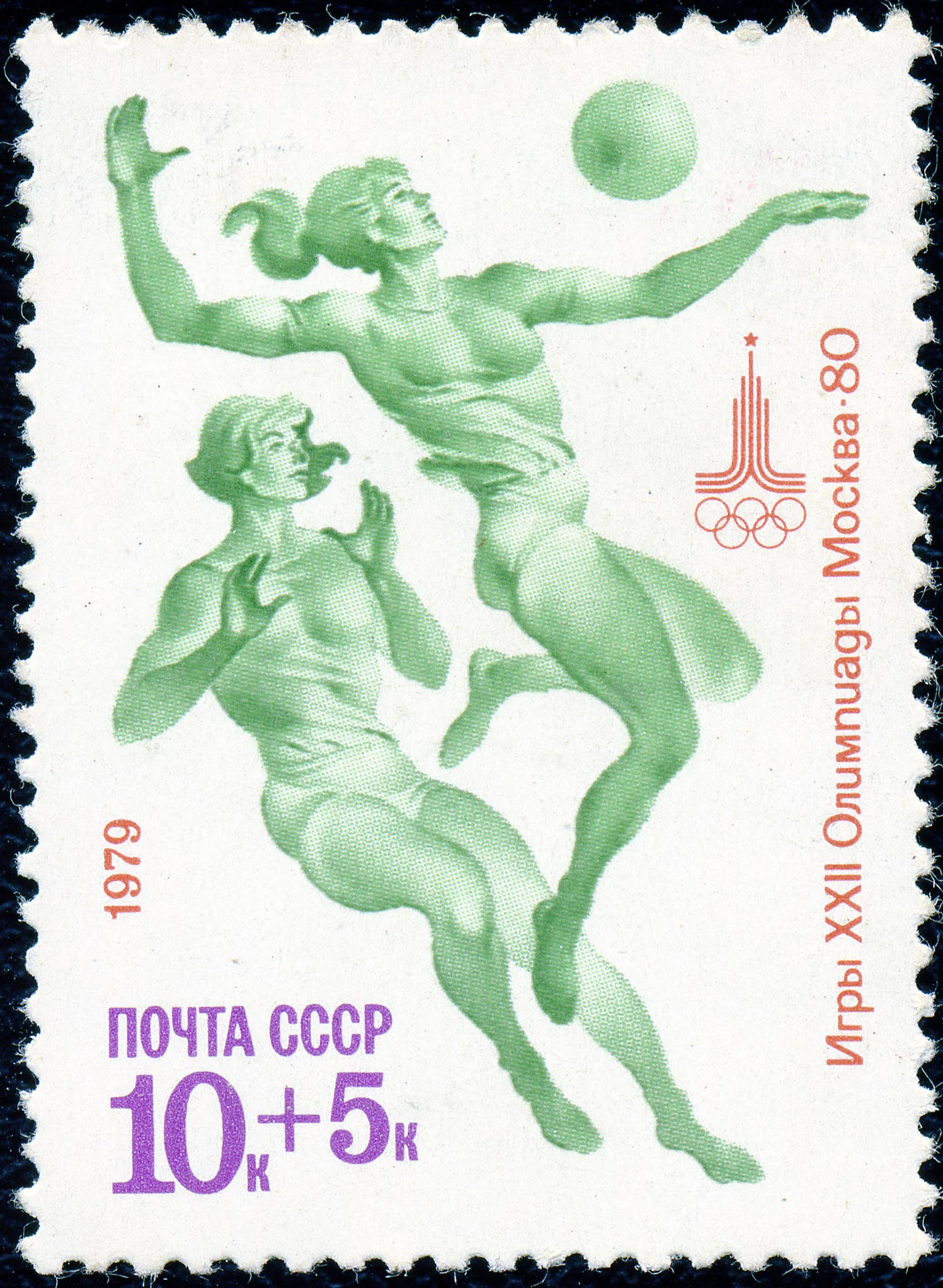
1979 USSR postage stamp depicting volleyball for the XXII Summer Olympics

Volleyball at the 1980 Summer Olympics was represented by two events. It was held at the Minor Arena of the Central Lenin Stadium and at the Druzhba (Friendship) Multi-Purpose Arena of the Central Lenin Stadium, both located at Luzhniki (south-western part of Moscow). The schedule started on July 20 and ended on August 1.

== Events ==
Two sets of medals were awarded in the following events:

- Indoor volleyball – men (10 teams, 113 athletes)
- Indoor volleyball – women (8 teams, 96 athletes)

== Medal table ==
Rank	Nation	Gold	Silver	Bronze	Total
1	Soviet Union	2	0	0	2
2	Bulgaria	0	1	1	2
3	East Germany	0	1	0	1
4	Romania	0	0	1	1
Totals (4 entries)		2	2	2	6

== Medal summary ==
Event	Gold	Silver	Bronze
Men's indoor	Soviet Union; Vladimir Chernyshov; Vladimir Dorokhov; Aleksandr Ermilov; Vladimir Kondra; Valeriy Kryvov; Fedir Lashchonov; Viljar Loor; Oleg Moliboga; Yuriy Panchenko; Aleksandr Savin; Pāvels Seļivanovs; Vyacheslav Zaytsev	Bulgaria; Yordan Angelov; Dimitar Dimitrov; Stefan Dimitrov; Stoyan Gunchev; Hristo Iliev; Petko Petkov; Kaspar Simeonov; Hristo Stoyanov; Mitko Todorov; Tsano Tsanov; Emil Valtchev; Dimitar Zlatanov	Romania; Marius Căta-Chiţiga; Valter Chifu; Laurenţiu Dumănoiu; Günther Enescu; Dan Gîrleanu; Sorin Macavei; Viorel Manole; Florin Mina; Corneliu Oros; Nicolae Pop; Constantin Sterea; Nicu Stoian
Women's indoor	Soviet Union; Elena Akhaminova; Elena Andreiuk; Svetlana Badulina; Liudmila Chernyshova; Liubov Kozyreva; Lidia Loginova; Irina Makogonova; Svetlana Nikishina; Larisa Pavlova; Nadezhda Radzevich; Natalia Razumova; Olga Solovova	East Germany; Katharina Bullin; Barbara Czekalla; Brigitte Fetzer; Andrea Heim; Ute Kostrzewa; Heike Lehmann; Christine Mummhardt; Karin Püschel; Karla Roffeis; Martina Schmidt; Annette Schultz; Anke Westendorf	Bulgaria; Verka Borisova; Tsvetana Bozhurina; Rositsa Dimitrova; Tanya Dimitrova; Maya Georgieva; Margarita Gerasimova; Tanya Gogova; Valentina Ilieva; Rumyana Kaisheva; Anka Khristolova; Silviya Petrunova; Galina Stancheva
