= Corneliu Oros =

Romanian volleyball player (born 1950)

Cornel Oros
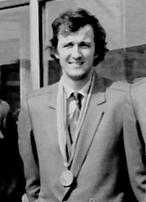

Personal information
- Full name: Corneliu Oros
- Born: 5 March 1950 (age 76) Oradea, Romania
- Height: 190 cm (6 ft 3 in)
- Weight: 80 kg (176 lb)

Sport
- Country: Romania
- Sport: Volleyball
- Club: Dinamo București
Medal record
Olympic Games
Bronze medal – third place	1980 Moscow	Team
European Championship
Bronze medal – third place	1971 Italy	Team

Corneliu "Cornel" Oros (born 5 March 1950) is a retired Romanian volleyball player. He competed at the 1972 and 1980 Olympics and won a bronze medal in 1980.

Oros took up volleyball in 1964 in Oradea Sports School. He then moved to Dinamo București and won with them eight national titles between 1972 and 1980. At the CEV Champions League, his team finished second in 1968, 1974 and 1977, and third in 1975. In 1968, he was included to the national team and won bronze medals at the 1969 junior and 1971 senior European championships. After retiring from competition, he worked as a volleyball coach, first at Dinamo București in Romania and then in Spain.
