= Viorel Manole =

Romanian volleyball player (born 1956)

Personal information
- Nationality: Romanian
- Born: 31 May 1956 (age 70) Brasov, Romania
Honours
Men's volleyball
Representing Romania
Olympic Games
Bronze medal – third place	1980 Moscow	Team

Viorel Manole (born 31 May 1956) is a Romanian former volleyball player who competed in the 1980 Summer Olympics.

Manole was born in Brasov.

In 1980, Manole was a member of the Romanian team that won the bronze medal in the Olympic tournament.
