= Florin Mina =

Romanian volleyball player (1959–2006)

Personal information
- Nationality: Romanian
- Born: 3 July 1959; Tulcea, Romania
- Died: 2006 (aged 46); Romania
Medal record
Men's volleyball
Representing Romania
Olympic Games
Bronze medal – third place	1980 Moscow	Team

Florin Mina (3 July 1959 – 2006) was a Romanian former volleyball player who competed in the 1980 Summer Olympics.

Mina was born in Tulcea.

In 1980, Mina was a member of the Romanian national team that won the bronze medal in the Olympic tournament.
