= Aleksandr Ermilov =

Russian volleyball player (born 1954)

Personal information
- Full name: Aleksandr Borisovich Ermilov
- Born: 12 December 1954 (age 71); Ivanovo, Russian SFSR, Soviet Union
- Height: 2.00 m (6 ft 7 in)

Volleyball information
- Position: Opposite
- Number: 5

National team
1975–1980	Soviet Union
Honours
Men's volleyball
Representing Soviet Union
Olympic Games
Gold medal – first place	1980 Moscow	Team
Silver medal – second place	1976 Montreal	Team
World Championship
Gold medal – first place	1978 Italy
European Championship
Gold medal – first place	1975 Yugoslavia
Gold medal – first place	1977 Finland
Gold medal – first place	1979 France

Aleksandr Borisovich Ermilov (Russian: Александр Борисович Ермилов, born 12 December 1954) is a Russian former volleyball player who competed for the Soviet Union in the 1976 Summer Olympics in Montreal and the 1980 Summer Olympics in Moscow.

In 1976, Ermilov was part of the Soviet team that won the silver medal in the Olympic tournament. He played all five matches.

Four years later, Ermilov won the gold medal with the Soviet team in the 1980 Olympic tournament. He played four matches.
