= Tsvetan Golomeev =

Bulgarian swimmer (1961–2010)

Personal information
- Born: 21 July 1961 Velingrad, Bulgaria
- Died: 16 September 2010 (aged 49) Kriti, Greece

Sport
- Sport: Swimming

Tsvetan Golomeev (Bulgarian: Цветан Голомеев; 21 July 1961 – 16 September 2010) was a Bulgarian swimmer. He competed at the 1980 Summer Olympics and the 1988 Summer Olympics.

His son Kristian Gkolomeev is also a professional swimmer.
