= Fedir Lashchonov =

Ukrainian volleyball player (born 1950)

Personal information
- Full name: Fedir Serafynovych Lashchonov
- Nickname: Федір Серафимович Лащонов
- Nationality: Russian
- Born: 4 November 1950 (age 75); Rovenky, Luhansk Oblast, Ukrainian SSR (present-day Ukraine)
- Height: 1.98 m (6 ft 6 in)

Volleyball information
- Number: 10

National team
1977–1980	Soviet Union
Honours
Men's volleyball
Representing Soviet Union
Olympic Games
Gold medal – first place	1980 Moscow	Team
World Championship
Gold medal – first place	1978 Italy
FIVB World Cup
Gold medal – first place	1977 Japan

Fedir Serafymovych Lashchonov (Ukrainian: Федір Серафимович Лащонов; Russian: Фёдор Серафимович Лащёнов Fyodor Serafimovich Lashchyonov, born 4 November 1950) is a Ukrainian former volleyball player who competed for the Soviet Union in the 1980 Summer Olympics in Moscow.

Lashchonov was born in Rovenky, Luhansk Oblast.

In 1980, Lashchonov was part of the Soviet team that won the gold medal in the Olympic tournament.
