= Borislav Asenov =

Bulgarian cyclist

Personal information
- Born: 16 June 1959 (age 67) Karapelit, Bulgaria

Cycling career
- Sport: Cycling

Borislav Asenov (Bulgarian: Борислав Асенов; born 16 June 1959) is a Bulgarian former cyclist. He competed in the individual road race and team time trial events at the 1980 Summer Olympics.
