= Yordan Penchev =

Bulgarian cyclist

Personal information
- Born: 26 August 1956 (age 70)

Cycling career
- Sport: Cycling

Yordan Penchev (Bulgarian: Йордан Пенчев, born 26 August 1956) is a Bulgarian former cyclist. He competed in the individual road race and team time trial events at the 1980 Summer Olympics.
