= Valeriy Kryvov =

Ukrainian volleyball player

Personal information
- Full name: Valeriy Mikhaylovych Kryvov
- Nickname: Валерій Михайлович Кривов
- Nationality: Soviet, Ukrainian
- Born: 29 September 1951 Krychaw, Belarus
- Died: 20 December 1994 (aged 43) Luhansk, Luhansk Oblast, Ukraine
- Height: 1.88 m (6 ft 2 in)

Volleyball information
- Position: Setter
- Number: 11

National team
- Years: Team
- 1977–1980: Soviet Union
Honours
Men's volleyball
Representing Soviet Union
Olympic Games
Gold medal – first place	1980 Moscow	Team
World Championship
Gold medal – first place	1978 Italy
European Championship
Gold medal – first place	1977 Finland

Valeriy Mikhaylovych Kryvov (Ukrainian: Валерій Михайлович Кривов, 29 September 1951 – 20 December 1994) was a Ukrainian volleyball player who competed for the Soviet Union in the 1980 Summer Olympics in Moscow.

Kryvov was born in Krychaw, Byelorussian SSR.

In 1980, Kryvov was part of the Soviet team that won the gold medal in the Olympic tournament.
