= Yulyan Vasilev =

Bulgarian swimmer

Personal information
- Born: 16 August 1961
- Died: 1 August 2021 (aged 59)

Sport
- Sport: Swimming

Yulyan Vasilev (Bulgarian: Юлиян Василев; 16 August 1961 – 1 August 2021) was a Bulgarian swimmer. He competed in three events at the 1980 Summer Olympics.
