= Branimir Popov =

Bulgarian swimmer

Personal information
- Born: 10 May 1962 (age 64) Sofia, Bulgaria

Sport
- Sport: Swimming

Branimir Popov (Bulgarian: Бранимир Попов, born 10 May 1962) is a Bulgarian swimmer. He competed in two events at the 1980 Summer Olympics.
