= Penka Metodieva =

Bulgarian basketball player

Medal record

Women's basketball

Representing Bulgaria

Olympic Games
Silver medal – second place	1980 Moskva	Team competition
Bronze medal – third place	1976 Montreal	Team competition

Penka Metodieva (Bulgarian: Пенка Методиева; born 12 October 1950 in Pernik, Bulgaria) is a Bulgarian former basketball player who competed in the 1976 Summer Olympics and in the 1980 Summer Olympics.
