= Krasimira Bogdanova =

Bulgarian basketball player

Medal record

Women's basketball

Representing Bulgaria

Olympic Games
Silver medal – second place	1980 Moskva	Team competition
Bronze medal – third place	1976 Montreal	Team competition

Krasimira Nikolova Georgieva-Bogdanova (Bulgarian: Красимира Николова Георгиева-Богданова, 5 June 1949 – 10 March 1992) was a Bulgarian basketball player who competed in the 1976 Summer Olympics and in the 1980 Summer Olympics. She was a wife of Petar Bogdanov.
