= Valentina Ilieva =

Bulgarian volleyball player (born 1962)

- Валентина Илиева
- Born: 12 March 1962 (age 64)
- Occupation: volleyball player

Valentina Ilieva
Medal record

Women's volleyball

Representing Bulgaria

Olympic Games
Bronze medal – third place	1980 Moscow	Team

Valentina Ilieva (Bulgarian: Валентина Илиева, born 12 March 1962), later Kharalampieva (Bulgarian: Харалампиева), is a Bulgarian female former volleyball player who competed in the 1980 Summer Olympics.

In 1980, Ilieva was part of the Bulgarian team that won the bronze medal in the Olympic tournament. She played two matches.
