= Vanya Dermendzhieva =

Bulgarian basketball player

Medal record

Women's basketball

Representing Bulgaria

Olympic Games
Silver medal – second place	1980 Moskva	Team competition

Vanya Dermendzhieva (Bulgarian: Ваня Дерменджиева, also transliterated Vania Dermendjieva, born 3 December 1958) is a Bulgarian former basketball player who competed in the 1980 Summer Olympics and in the 1988 Summer Olympics.
