= Nadiya Filipova =

Bulgarian rowing cox (born 1959)

Medal record

Women's rowing

Representing Bulgaria

Olympic Games
Silver medal – second place	1980 Moscow	Coxed four

Nadiya Filipova (Bulgarian: Надия Филипова, born 19 October 1959) is a Bulgarian rowing cox.
