= Snezhana Mikhaylova =

Bulgarian basketball player (born 1954)

Medal record

Women's basketball

Representing Bulgaria

Olympic Games
Silver medal – second place	1980 Moskva	Team competition
Bronze medal – third place	1976 Montreal	Team competition

Snezhana Mikhaylova (Bulgarian: Снежана Михайлова; born 29 January 1954) is a Bulgarian former basketball player who competed in the 1976 Summer Olympics and in the 1980 Summer Olympics.
