= Margarita Gerasimova =

Bulgarian volleyball player

Olympic medal record

Women's Volleyball
Bronze medal – third place	1980 Moscow	Team

Margarita Gerasimova (Bulgarian: Маргарита Герасимова, born January 6, 1951) is a Bulgarian former volleyball player who competed in the 1980 Summer Olympics.

In 1980, Gerasimova was a member of the Bulgarian team that won the bronze medal in the Olympic tournament.
