= Diana Dilova-Braynova =

Bulgarian basketball player

Personal information
- Full name: Diana Voutova Dilova-Braynova
- Born: 1 January 1952 (age 74) Sofia, Bulgaria
- Height: 185 cm (6 ft 1 in)
- Weight: 79 kg (174 lb)

Sport
- Sport: Basketball
- Club: BC Lokomotiv Sofia
Medal record
Women's basketball
Representing Bulgaria
Olympic Games
Silver medal – second place	1980 Moskva	Team competition
Bronze medal – third place	1976 Montreal	Team competition

Diana Voutova Dilova-Braynova (Bulgarian: Диана Брайнова-Дилова; born 1 January 1952) is a Bulgarian former basketball player who competed in the 1976 Summer Olympics and in the 1980 Summer Olympics.
