= Dolores Nakova =

Bulgarian rower (born 1957)

Personal information
- Born: Dolores Zdravkova Nakova; 15 June 1957 (age 69) Ruse, Bulgaria
- Height: 179 cm (5 ft 10 in)
- Weight: 80 kg (176 lb)

Sport
- Sport: Rowing
Medal record
Women's rowing
Representing Bulgaria
Olympic Games
Bronze medal – third place	1980 Moscow	Coxed quad sculls
World Rowing Championships
Gold medal – first place	1978 Karapiro	Coxed quad scull
Silver medal – second place	1979 Bled	Coxed quad sculls

Dolores Zdravkova Nakova (Bulgarian: Долорес Накова; born 15 June 1957 in Ruse) is a Bulgarian former rower who competed in the 1980 Summer Olympics.
