= Rumelyana Boncheva =

Bulgarian rower (born 1957)

Personal information
- Born: 25 April 1957 (age 69) Varna, Bulgaria
- Height: 176 cm (5 ft 9 in)
- Weight: 69 kg (152 lb)

Sport
- Sport: Rowing
Medal record
Women's rowing
Representing Bulgaria
Olympic Games
Bronze medal – third place	1980 Moscow	Coxed quad sculls
World Rowing Championships
Bronze medal – third place	1977 Amsterdam	Coxed quad sculls
Gold medal – first place	1978 Karapiro	Coxed quad scull
Silver medal – second place	1979 Bled	Coxed quad sculls

Rumelyana Boncheva Stefanova (Bulgarian: Румеляна Бончева; born 25 April 1957 in Varna) is a Bulgarian former rower who competed in the 1980 Summer Olympics.
