= Angelina Mikhaylova =

Bulgarian basketball player

Medal record

Women's basketball

Representing Bulgaria

Olympic Games
Silver medal – second place	1980 Moskva	Team competition

Angelina Mikhaylova (Bulgarian: Ангелина Михайлова, born 9 June 1960) is a Bulgarian former basketball player who competed in the 1980 Summer Olympics.
