= Anka Khristolova =

Bulgarian volleyball player (born 1955)

Anka Tomova Khristolova

Personal information
- Full name: Anka Tomova Hristolova (-Uzunova, -Tomova)
- Nationality: Bulgarian
- Born: 12 January 1955 (age 71)
- Height: 174 cm (5 ft 9 in)

Volleyball information
- Number: 5
Honours
Women's volleyball
Representing Bulgaria
Olympic Games
| Bronze medal – third place | 1980 Moscow | Team |
European Championship
| Gold medal – first place | 1981 Bulgaria | Team |
| Bronze medal – third place | 1979 France | Team |

Anka Tomova Khristolova (later Uzunova, later Tomova, Bulgarian: Анка Томова Христолова, later Узунова, later Томова, born 12 January 1955) is a Bulgarian former volleyball player who competed in the 1980 Summer Olympics.

In 1980, Khristolova was part of the Bulgarian that won the bronze medal in the Olympic tournament. She played all five matches.
