= Kaspar Simeonov =

Bulgarian volleyball player (born 1955)

Medal record

Men's Volleyball
| Silver medal – second place | 1980 Moscow | Team |

Kaspar Simeonov (Bulgarian: Каспар Симеонов, born May 17, 1955) is a Bulgarian former volleyball player who competed in the 1980 Summer Olympics.

Simeonov was born in Dimitrovgrad.

Simeonov played for Lokomotiv Plovdiv volleyball club from 1974 to 1984. In 1980, he was part of the Bulgarian team that won the silver medal in the Olympic tournament. He played three matches. He played in Italy from 1984 to 1988. He is the father of volleyball player Venceslav Simeonov.
