= Silviya Petrunova =

Bulgarian volleyball player (born 1956)

Medal record

Women's volleyball

Representing Bulgaria

Olympic Games
Bronze medal – third place	1980 Moscow	Team

Silviya Petrunova (Bulgarian: Силвия Петрунова, born 13 February 1956) is a Bulgarian former volleyball player who competed in the 1980 Summer Olympics.

In 1980, Petrunova was part of the Bulgarian team that won the bronze medal in the Olympic tournament. She played all five matches.
