= Dimitar Dimitrov (volleyball) =

Bulgarian volleyball player (born 1952)

Olympic medal record

Men's Volleyball
Silver medal – second place	1980 Moscow	Team

Dimitar Dimitrov (Bulgarian: Димитър Димитров, born January 12, 1952) is a Bulgarian former volleyball player who competed in the 1980 Summer Olympics.

In 1980, Dimitrov was part of the Bulgarian team that won the silver medal in the Olympic tournament. He played five matches.
