= Petko Petkov (volleyball) =

Bulgarian volleyball player (born 1958)

Olympic medal record

Men's Volleyball
Silver medal – second place	1980 Moscow	Team

Petko Petkov (Bulgarian: Петко Петков; born May 17, 1958) is a Bulgarian former volleyball player who competed in the 1980 Summer Olympics and 1988 Summer Olympics.

Petkov was born in Dimitrovgrad.

In 1980, Petkov won the silver medal with Bulgarian team in the Olympic tournament. He played all six matches.

Eight years later, Petkov was part of the Bulgarian team that finished sixth in the Olympic tournament. He played six matches.
