= Tsano Tsanov =

Bulgarian volleyball player (born 1949)

Personal information
- Born: March 25, 1949 (age 77) Bulgaria
- Height: 1.86 m (6 ft 1 in)
Medal record
Men's volleyball
Representing Bulgaria
Olympic Games
Silver medal – second place	1980 Moscow	Team

Tsano Tsanov (Bulgarian: Цано Цанов, born March 25, 1949) is a Bulgarian former volleyball player who competed in the 1972 Summer Olympics and in the 1980 Summer Olympics.

In 1972, Tsanov was part of the Bulgarian team that finished fourth in the Olympic tournament. He played all seven matches.

Eight years later, Tsanov won the silver medal with the Bulgarian team in the 1980 Olympic tournament. He played all six matches.
