= Verka Borisova =

Bulgarian volleyball player (born 1955)

Olympic medal record

Women's Volleyball
Bronze medal – third place	1980 Moscow	Team

Verka Borisova (later Stoyanova, Bulgarian: Верка Борисова, later Стоянова, born 26 February 1955) is a Bulgarian former volleyball player who competed in the 1980 Summer Olympics.

In 1980, Borisova was part of the Bulgarian team that won the bronze medal in the Olympic tournament. She played all five matches. She also won the best setter award of the tournament.
