= Stoyan Gunchev =

Bulgarian volleyball player (born 1958)

Personal information
- Nationality: Bulgarian
- Born: 11 February 1958 (age 68)
- Height: 178 cm (5 ft 10 in)

Volleyball information
- Position: Setter
- Number: 1

National team
1978-1984	Bulgaria
Honours
Men's volleyball
Representing Bulgaria
Olympic Games
Silver medal – second place	1980 Moscow	Team

Stoyan Gunchev (Bulgarian: Стоян Гунчев, born 11 February 1958) is a Bulgarian former volleyball player who competed in the 1980 Summer Olympics.

In 1980, Gunchev was part of the Bulgarian team that won the silver medal in the Olympic tournament. He played four matches.
