= Emil Valtchev =

Bulgarian volleyball player

Olympic medal record

Men's Volleyball
Silver medal – second place	1980 Moscow	Team

Emil Valtchev (Bulgarian: Емил Вълчев, February 23, 1950 – November 2, 2022) was a Bulgarian volleyball player who competed in the 1972 Summer Olympics and in the 1980 Summer Olympics. In 1972, Valtchev was part of the Bulgarian team that finished fourth in the Olympic tournament. He played all seven matches. Eight years later, Valtchev won the silver medal with the Bulgarian team in the 1980 Olympic tournament. He played all six matches.
