= Dimitar Zlatanov =

Bulgarian volleyball player

Personal information
- Full name: Dimitar Ivanov Zlatanov
- Born: 9 November 1948 (age 77); Ihtiman, Bulgaria
- Height: 195 cm (6 ft 5 in)

Volleyball information
- Position: Outside hitter
- Number: 3

Career
Teams
	CSKA

National team
1968–1982	Bulgaria
Medal record
Men's volleyball
Representing Bulgaria
Olympic Games
Silver medal – second place	1980 Moscow	Team
World Championship
Silver medal – second place	1970 Bulgaria

Dimitar Zlatanov (Bulgarian: Димитър Златанов; born 9 November 1948) is a retired Bulgarian volleyball player who is a three-time Olympian. Zlatanov won a silver medal at the 1980 Olympics, and also previously competed at the 1968 and 1972 Olympics. He won eight national championships with the club team CSKA of Sofia. He is widely regarded as one of the best players of all time.

Zlatanov was inducted into the International Volleyball Hall of Fame in 2007.

== Personal life ==
Zlatanov's son, Hristo Zlatanov, played for the Italian national team. Zlatanov's grandson, Manuel, broke the record as the youngest ever player in the Italian SuperLega.
