= Stefan Dimitrov (volleyball) =

Bulgarian former volleyball player

Olympic medal record

Men's Volleyball
Silver medal – second place	1980 Moscow	Team

Stefan Dimitrov (Bulgarian: Стефан Димитров, born 15 May 1956) is a Bulgarian former volleyball player who competed in the 1980 Summer Olympics.

In 1980, Dimitrov was part of the Bulgarian team that won the silver medal in the Olympic tournament. He played five matches.
