= Maya Georgieva (volleyball) =

Bulgarian volleyball player (1955–2023)

Olympic medal record

Women's Volleyball
Bronze medal – third place	1980 Moscow	Team

Maya Vladimirova Georgieva (Bulgarian: Мая Владимирова Георгиева, later Stoeva, Bulgarian: Стоева, 7 May 1955 – 21 September 2023) was a Bulgarian volleyball player who competed in the 1980 Summer Olympics.

== Biography ==
Georgieva was born in Sofia on 7 May 1955. In 1980, Georgieva was part of the Bulgarian team that won the bronze medal in the Olympic tournament. She played all five matches. Georgieva died on 21 September 2023, at the age of 68.

== Sources ==
- Evans, Hilary; Gjerde, Arild; Heijmans, Jeroen; Mallon, Bill; et al. "Maya Georgieva". Olympics at Sports-Reference.com. Sports Reference LLC. Archived from the original on 18 April 2020.
