= Rumyana Kaisheva =

Bulgarian volleyball player (born 1955)

Medal record

Women's volleyball

Representing Bulgaria

Olympic Games
Bronze medal – third place	1980 Moscow	Team

Rumyana Kaisheva (Bulgarian: Румяна Каишева, born 26 December 1955) is a Bulgarian female former volleyball player who competed in the 1980 Summer Olympics.

In 1980, Kaisheva was part of the Bulgarian team that won the bronze medal in the Olympic tournament. She played all five matches.
