= Tanya Gogova =

Bulgarian volleyball player (born 1950)

Olympic medal record

Women's Volleyball
Bronze medal – third place	1980 Moscow	Team

Tanya Gogova Ayshinova (Bulgarian: Таня Гогова Айшинова, born 28 April 1950) is a Bulgarian former volleyball player who competed in the 1980 Summer Olympics.

Ayshinova was born in Kardzhali.

In 1980, Ayshinova was part of the Bulgarian team that won the bronze medal in the Olympic tournament. She played all five matches.
