= Hristo Stoyanov =

Bulgarian volleyball player (born 1953)

Olympic medal record

Men's Volleyball
Silver medal – second place	1980 Moscow	Team

Hristo Stoyanov (Bulgarian: Христо Стоянов, born 5 July 1953) is a Bulgarian former volleyball player who competed in the 1980 Summer Olympics.

In 1980, Stoyanov was part of the Bulgarian team that won the silver medal in the Olympic tournament. He played all six matches.
