= Rositsa Dimitrova =

Bulgarian volleyball player (born 1955)

Olympic medal record

Women's Volleyball
Bronze medal – third place	1980 Moscow	Team

Rositsa Dimitrova (Bulgarian: Росица Димитрова, born 21 February 1955) is a Bulgarian former volleyball player who competed in the 1980 Summer Olympics.

In 1980, Dimitrova was part of the Bulgarian team that won the bronze medal in the Olympic tournament. She played four matches.
