= Tsvetana Bozhurina =

Bulgarian volleyball player (born 1952)

Personal information
- Full name: Tsvetana Bozhurina (later Fillippini)
- Nationality: Bulgarian
- Born: June 13, 1952 (age 74) Pernik, Bulgaria
- Height: 180 cm (5 ft 11 in)
- Weight: 75 kg (165 lb)

Volleyball information

National team
- Years: Team
- –: Bulgaria
Honours
Bronze medal – third place	1980 Moscow	Team

Tsvetana Bozhurina (Bulgarian: Цветана Божурина, later Fillippini, Bulgarian: Филипини, born June 13, 1952) is a Bulgarian former volleyball player who competed in the 1980 Summer Olympics. She was born in Pernik.

In 1980, Bozhurina was part of the Bulgarian team that won the bronze medal in the Olympic volleyball tournament. She participated in all five matches played.
