= Tanya Dimitrova =

Bulgarian volleyball player (born 1957)

Olympic medal record

Women's Volleyball
Bronze medal – third place	1980 Moscow	Team

Tanya Georgieva Dimitrova (later Todorova, Bulgarian: Таня Георгиева Димитрова, later Тодорова, born March 15, 1957) is a Bulgarian former volleyball player who competed in the 1980 Summer Olympics.

Dimitrova was born in Pernik.

In 1980, Dimitrova was part of the Bulgarian team that won the bronze medal in the Olympic tournament. She played three matches.
