= Yordan Angelov =

Bulgarian volleyball player (1953–2013)

Olympic medal record

Men's volleyball

Representing Bulgaria

Olympic Games
Silver medal – second place	1980 Moscow	Team

Yordan Angelov (Bulgarian: Йордан Ангелов, 28 August 1953 – 5 May 2013) was a Bulgarian volleyball player who competed in the 1980 Summer Olympics.

In 1980, Angelov was part of the Bulgarian team that won the silver medal in the Olympic tournament.
