= Mitko Todorov =

Bulgarian volleyball player (born 1956)

Olympic medal record

Men's Volleyball
Silver medal – second place	1980 Moscow	Team

Mitko Todorov (Bulgarian: Митко Тодоров, born 16 June 1956) is a Bulgarian former volleyball player who competed in the 1980 Summer Olympics.

Todorov was born in Pernik.

In 1980, Todorov was part of the Bulgarian national team that won the silver medal in the Olympic tournament. He played all six matches.
