= Galina Stancheva =

Bulgarian volleyball player

Medal record

Women's volleyball

Representing Bulgaria

Olympic Games
Bronze medal – third place	1980 Moscow	Team

Galina Stancheva (Bulgarian: Галина Станчева, born July 31, 1952) is a Bulgarian former volleyball player who competed in the 1980 Summer Olympics in Moscow, USSR.

In 1980, Stancheva was a member of the Bulgarian team that won the bronze medal in the Olympic tournament.
