= Hristo Iliev (volleyball) =

Bulgarian volleyball player (born 1951)

Olympic medal record

Men's Volleyball
Silver medal – second place	1980 Moscow	Team

Hristo Iliev (Bulgarian: Христо Илиев, born November 7, 1951) is a Bulgarian former volleyball player who competed in the 1980 Summer Olympics.

In 1980, Iliev was part of the Bulgarian team that won the silver medal in the Olympic tournament. He played all six matches.
