= North Korea at the 1980 Summer Olympics =

- IOC code: PRK
- NOC: Olympic Committee of the Democratic People's Republic of Korea

in Moscow
- Competitors: 47 in 8 sports
- Medals Ranked 26th: Gold 0 Silver 3 Bronze 2 Total 5

Summer Olympics appearances (overview)
- 1972; 1976; 1980; 1984–1988; 1992; 1996; 2000; 2004; 2008; 2012; 2016; 2020; 2024

North Korea competed as the Democratic People's Republic of Korea at the 1980 Summer Olympics in Moscow, USSR.

== Medalists ==
| Medal | Name | Sport | Event |
|---|---|---|---|
| Silver | Se-Hong Jang | Wrestling | Men's freestyle light flyweight |
| Silver | Ho-Pyong Li | Wrestling | Men's freestyle bantamweight |
| Silver | Bong-Chol Ho | Weightlifting | Men's flyweight |
| Bronze | Ri Byong-uk | Boxing | Men's light flyweight |
| Bronze | Gyong-Si Han | Weightlifting | Men's flyweight |

== Archery ==
1980 was the second time that North Korea competed in archery in the Olympics. Two women and one man competed.

Women's Individual Competition:

- O Gwang-sun — 2401 points (→ 5th place)
- Sok Chang-suk — 2269 points (→ 17th place)

Men's Individual Competition:

- Kim Gye-Yong — 2331 points (→ 22nd place)

== Athletics ==
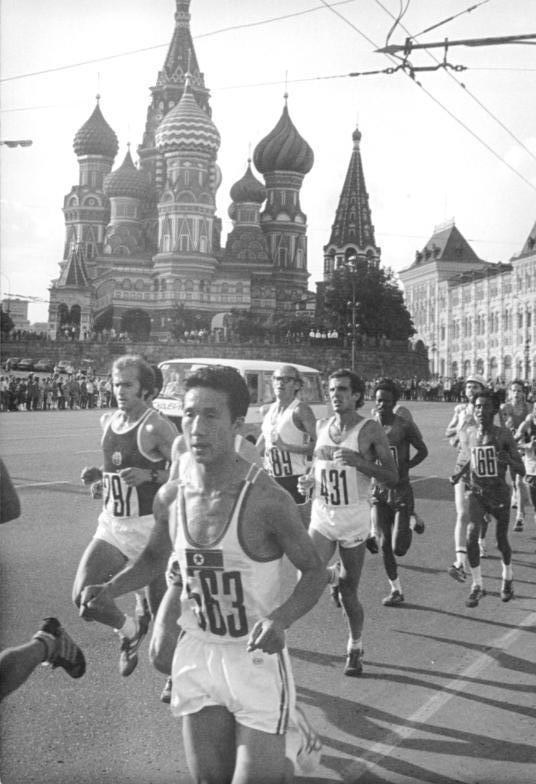
Marathon: Chun Son-Koh in front of Saint Basil's Cathedral

Men's Marathon

- Chun Son-Koh

- Final — 2:20:08 (→ 27th place)

- Jong Hyong-Li

- Final — 2:21:10 (→ 29th place)

- Chang Sop-Choe

- Final — 2:22:42 (→ 33rd place)

== Boxing ==
Men's Light Flyweight (48 kg)

- Li Byong-Uk → Bronze Medal
  1. First Round — Defeated Henryk Pielesiak (Poland) on points (3-2)
  2. Second Round — Defeated Gilberto Sosa (Mexico) on points (3-2)
  3. Quarter Finals — Defeated Dumitru Şchiopu (Romania) on points (4-1)
  4. Semi Finals — Lost to Shamil Sabirov (Soviet Union) on points (0-5)

Men's Flyweight (51 kg)

- Yo Ryon-Sik
  1. First Round — Defeated Amala Dass (India) on points (5-0)
  2. Second Round — Defeated Ramon Armando Guevara (Venezuela) on points (4-1)
  3. Quarter Finals — Lost to Hugh Russell (Ireland) on points (2-3)

Men's Featherweight (57 kg)

- Gu Yong-ju
  1. First Round — Bye
  2. Second Round — Lost to Krzysztof Kosedowski (Poland) on points (0-5)

Men's Lightweight (60 kg)

- Jong Jo-Ung
  1. First Round — Defeated Rabani Ghulam (Afghanistan) after referee stopped contest in second round
  2. Second Round — Lost to Viktor Demyanenko (Soviet Union) on points (0-5)

Men's Light-Welterweight (63,5 kg)

- Ryu Bun-Hwa
  1. First Round — Defeated Bishnu Malakar (Nepal) after referee stopped contest in first round
  2. Second Round — Lost to José Aguilar (Cuba) on points (1-4)

== Gymnastics ==
11 athletes have participated.

- Cho Hun
- Choe Jong-Sil
- Choe Myong-Hui
- Han Gwang-Song
- Kang Gwang-Song
- Kim Chun-Son
- Kim Gwang-Jin
- Li Su-Gil
- Lo Ok-Sil
- Sin-Myong-Ok
- Song Sun-Bong

== Judo ==
4 male athletes have participated.

- Kim Byong-Gun
- Kim Myong-Gyu
- Ko Hyong
- Pak Jong-Chol

== Wrestling ==
Men's freestyle 48 kg

- Jang Se-hong
  1. First Round — Defeated Gombyn Khishigbaatar (MGL), 7:43 (won by fall)
  2. Second Round — Defeated Mohammed Jabbar (IRQ), 2:41 (won by fall)
  3. Third Round — Defeated Mohammad Aktar (AFG), 8:30 (won by fall)
  4. Fourth Round — Lost to Claudio Pollio (ITA), 7:12 (won by passivity)
  5. Fifth Round — Defeated Jan Falandys (POL), 8 - 13
  6. Final
    1. Lost to Claudio Pollio (ITA), 7:12 (won by passivity)
    2. Defeated Sergey Kornilayev (URS), 7:23 (won by fall) → Silver Medal

Men's freestyle 52 kg

- Jang Dok-ryong
  1. First Round — Lost to Ashok Kumar (IND), 7 - 12
  2. Second Round — Defeated Mark Dunbar (GBR), 2 - 37
  3. Third Round — Defeated Mohammad Aynutdin (AFG), 6:28 (won by fall)
  4. Fourth Round — Lost to Nermedin Selimov (BUL), 16 - 6 → 5th place

Men's freestyle 57 kg

- Li Ho-pyong
  1. First Round — Defeated Cris Brown (AUS), 7:41 (won by fall)
  2. Second Round — Defeated Amrik Singh Gill (GBR), 5:03 (won by passivity)
  3. Third Round — Defeated Wiesław Kończak (POL), 9 - 5
  4. Fourth Round — Defeated Aurel Neagu (ROU), 3 - 10
  5. Fifth Round — Lost to Sergei Beloglazov (URS), 1:12 (won by fall)
  6. Final
    1. Lost to Sergei Beloglazov (URS), 1:12 (won by fall)
    2. Tied with Dugarsürengiin Oyuunbold (MGL), 7 - 7 → Silver Medal
