= Algeria at the 1980 Summer Olympics =

- IOC code: ALG
- NOC: Algerian Olympic Committee

in Moscow
- Competitors: 54 (54 men) in 9 sports
- Flag bearer: Djamel Yahiouche
- Medals: Gold 0 Silver 0 Bronze 0 Total 0

Summer Olympics appearances (overview)
- 1964; 1968; 1972; 1976; 1980; 1984; 1988; 1992; 1996; 2000; 2004; 2008; 2012; 2016; 2020; 2024

Other related appearances
- France (1896–1960)

Algeria competed at the 1980 Summer Olympics in Moscow, USSR. The nation returned to the Olympic Games after boycotting the 1976 Summer Olympics. Algeria did not participate in the US-led boycott of the Moscow games and instead sending athletes to compete in Moscow. 54 competitors, all men, took part in 28 events in 9 sports.

== Athletics ==
Men
Track & road events

Athlete	Event	Heat		Semifinal		Final	
Athlete	Event	Result	Rank	Result	Rank	Result	Rank
El-Hachemi Abdenouz	5000 m	13:42.07	1 Q	14:15.85	12	Did not advance	
Mehdi Aidet	800 m	1:50.4	3 Q	1:48.11	8	Did not advance	
Mehdi Aidet	1500 m	3:43.86	2 Q	3:44.85	9	Did not advance	
Lahcen Babaci	3000 m steeplechase	8:38.68	7 Q	8:25.47	6 Q	8:31.80	11
Derradji Harek	800 m	1:49.9	5 Q	1:51.81	8	Did not advance	
Derradji Harek	1500 m	3:45.29	8	Did not advance			
Rachid Habchaoui	5000 m	13:59.85	9	Did not advance			
Rachid Habchaoui	10000 m	29:12.9	6	—N/a		Did not advance	
Abdel Madjid Mada	10000 m	30:23.4	6	—N/a		Did not advance	
Abdel Madjid Mada	Men's marathon	—N/a				DNF	
Abderrahmane Morceli	1500 m	3:45.96	7	Did not advance			

Field events

Athlete	Event	Qualification		Final	
Athlete	Event	Distance	Position	Distance	Position
Abdel Hamid Sahil	High jump	2.18	21	Did not advance	
Othmane Belfaa	High jump	2.05	28	Did not advance	

== Boxing ==
Men's Light Flyweight (– 48 kg)

- Ahmed Siad
  - First round — Bye
  - Second round — Defeated Lincoln Salcedo (Ecuador) on points (5-0)
  - Quarter Finals — Lost to Ismail Mustafov (Bulgaria) on points (0-5)

Men's Light-Welterweight (– 63,5 kg)

- Boualem Bel Alouane
  - First round — Defeated Barrington Cambridge (Guyana) on points (5-0)
  - Second round — Lost to Ace Rusevski (Yugoslavia) on points (0-5)

Light Heavyweight (– 81 kg)

- Mohamed Bouchiche
  - First round — Lost to Pawel Skrzecz (Poland) after walkover

== Fencing ==
One fencer represented Algeria in 1980.

Men's foil

- Tahar Hamou

== Football ==
=== Team Squad ===
Head coach: Mahieddine Khalef

No.	Pos.	Player	DoB	Age	Caps	Club	Tournament games	Tournament goals	Minutes played	Sub off	Sub on	Cards yellow/red
1	GK	Mourad Amara	Feb 19, 1959	21	0	(Algeria) JE Tizi-Ouzou	4	0	360	0	0	0
2	DF	Mahmoud Guendouz	Feb 24, 1953	27	?	(Algeria) MA Hussein Dey	4	0	360	0	0	1Y
4	DF	Bouzid Mahyouz	Jan 13, 1952	28	?	(Algeria) MP Alger	4	0	314	2	0	2Y
5	DF	Chaabane Merzekane	March 8, 1959	21	?	(Algeria) MA Hussein Dey	4	1	349	1	0	1Y
6	DF	Mohamed Khedis	Feb 29, 1952	28	?	(Algeria) MA Hussein Dey	3	0	270	0	0	0
7	FW	Rabah Madjer	Dec 15, 1958	21	?	(Algeria) MA Hussein Dey	4	1	348	1	0	1Y
8	MD	Ali Fergani	Sep 19, 1952	27	?	(Algeria) JE Tizi-Ouzou	4	0	360	0	0	1Y
9	FW	Tedj Bensaoula	Dec 25, 1954	25	?	(Algeria) MP Oran	4	0	360	0	0	0
10	MD	Lakhdar Belloumi	Dec 29, 1958	21	?	(Algeria) MP Alger	4	2	310	1	1	0
11	FW	Salah Assad	March 13, 1958	22	?	(Algeria) RS Kouba	4	0	343	1	0	0
12	GK	Mohamed Rahmani	Dec 10, 1958	21	?	(Algeria) EP Setif	0	0	0	0	0	0
13	DF	Salah Larbès	Sep 16, 1952	27	?	(Algeria) JE Tizi-Ouzou	4	0	360	0	0	0
14	FW	Djamel Menad	Jul 19, 1960	20	?	(Algeria) CM Belcourt	3	0	40	0	3	0
15	FW	M'hamed Bouhalla	Sep 29, 1954	25	?	(Algeria) ASO Chlef	0	0	0	0	0	0
16	DF	Abderrahmane Derouaz	Dec 12, 1955	24	?	(Algeria) USK Alger	3	0	108	0	2	0
17	MD	Hocine Yahi	Apr 25, 1960	20	?	(Algeria) CM Belcourt	0	0	0	0	0	0
15	MD	Mohamed Ouamar Ghrib	Jan 24, 1960	20	0	(Algeria) DNC Alger	1	0	90	0	0	0

=== Group results ===
July 20, 1980
12:00

Algeria	3 – 0	Syria
Belloumi 36'; Madjer 48'; Merzekane 73' (pen.)	Report

Dinamo Stadium, Minsk
Referee: Vojtech Christov (Czechoslovakia)
July 22, 1980
12:00

East Germany	1 – 0	Algeria
Terletzki 61'	Report

Republican Stadium, Kiev
Attendance: 70.000
Referee: Romualdo Arppi Filho (Brazil)
July 24, 1980
12:00

Spain	1 – 1	Algeria
Rincón 38'	Report	Belloumi 63'

Dinamo Stadium, Minsk
Referee: Eldar Azimzade (Soviet Union)

=== Group standings ===
Group C

Team	Pld	W	D	L	GF	GA	GD	Pts
East Germany	3	2	1	0	7	1	+6	5
Algeria	3	1	1	1	4	2	+2	3
Spain	3	0	3	0	2	2	0	3
Syria	3	0	1	2	0	8	−8	1

=== Quarter-final ===
July 27, 1980
12:00

Yugoslavia	3 – 0	Algeria
Miročević 5'; Šestić 19'; Zoran Vujović 70'	Report

Dinamo Stadium, Minsk
Referee: Klaus Scheurell (East Germany)

== Handball ==
Men's Team Competition

- Preliminary Round (Group B)
  - Lost to Yugoslavia (18-22)
  - Lost to Romania (18-26)
  - Lost to Soviet Union (10-33)
  - Lost to Switzerland (18-26)
  - Defeated Kuwait (30-17)
- Classification Match
  - 9th/10th place: Lost to Denmark (20-29) → 10th place

Team Roster

- Ahmed Farfar
- Abdelkerim Hamiche
- Azeddine Bouzerar
- Omar Azeb
- Ali Akacha
- Ahcene Djeffal
- Kamel Hebri
- Mouloud Meknache
- Abdelmadjid Slimani
- Abdelkrim Bendjemil
- Abdelatif Bergheul
- Abdelatif Bakir
- Rachid Mokrani
- Mohamed Machou

== Judo ==
Men

Athlete	Event	Round of 32	Round of 16	Quarterfinals	Semifinals	Repechage	Repechage semifinal	Final / BM	
Athlete	Event	Opposition Result	Opposition Result	Opposition Result	Opposition Result	Opposition Result	Opposition Result	Opposition Result	Rank
Ahmed Moussa	−60 kg	Bye	Sissoko (MLI); W 1:08	Emizh (URS); L 5:00	Did not advance				11

== Swimming ==
Men

Athlete	Event	Heat		Semifinal		Final	
Athlete	Event	Time	Rank	Time	Rank	Time	Rank
Mohamed Halimi	100 m freestyle	55:16	31	—N/a		Did not advance	
Reda Yadi	200 m freestyle	2:06.26	37	—N/a		Did not advance	
Mohamed Bendahmane	400 m freestyle	DNS		—N/a		Did not advance	
Abdelhakim Bitat; Reda Yadi; Mohamed Bendahmane; Mohamed Halimi	4 × 200 m freestyle relay	8:23.22	12	—N/a		Did not advance	

== Weightlifting ==
Bantamweight (56 kg)

- Ahmed Tarbi → Total: 240.0 kg → 11th place

Featherweight (60 kg)

- Mohamed Gouni → Total: 247.5 kg → 11th place

Heavyweight I (100 kg)

- Omar Yousfi → Total: 320.0 kg → 13th place

== Wrestling ==
Men's freestyle

Athlete	Event	Elimination Pool						Final round	
Athlete	Event	Round 1 Result	Round 2 Result	Round 3 Result	Round 4 Result	Round 5 Result	Round 6 Result	Final round Result	Rank
Mohamed Hachaichi	−52 kg	Thieng (VIE); W 15-8	Efremov (YUG); L T 4:30	Beloglazov (URS); L T 1:22	—N/a			Did not advance	10

Men's Greco-Roman

Athlete	Event	Elimination Pool						Final round	
Athlete	Event	Round 1 Result	Round 2 Result	Round 3 Result	Round 4 Result	Round 5 Result	Round 6 Result	Final round Result	Rank
Mohamed Moualek	−68 kg	Gaál (HUN); L T 0:58	Nalbandyan (URS); L DQ 4:56	—N/a				Did not advance	13
