= Wrestling at the 1980 Summer Olympics – Men's freestyle 48 kg =

Men's freestyle 48 kg at the Games of the XXII Olympiad
- Venue: Central Sports Club of the Army
- Dates: 27–29 July 1980
- Competitors: 14 from 14 nations

Medalists
| 1st place, gold medalist(s) | | Claudio Pollio | Italy |
| 2nd place, silver medalist(s) | | Jang Se-Hong | North Korea |
| 3rd place, bronze medalist(s) | | Sergei Kornilayev | Soviet Union |

The Men's Freestyle 48 kg at the 1980 Summer Olympics as part of the wrestling program were held at the Athletics Fieldhouse, Central Sports Club of the Army.

== Medalists ==
| Gold | Claudio Pollio; Italy |
| Silver | Jang Se-Hong; North Korea |
| Bronze | Sergei Kornilayev; Soviet Union |

== Tournament results ==
The competition used a form of negative points tournament, with negative points given for any result short of a fall. Accumulation of 6 negative points eliminated the loser wrestler. When only three wrestlers remain, a special final round is used to determine the order of the medals.

Legend

- TF — Won by Fall
- IN — Won by Opponent Injury
- DQ — Won by Passivity
- D1 — Won by Passivity, the winner is passive too
- D2 — Both wrestlers lost by Passivity
- FF — Won by Forfeit
- DNA — Did not appear
- TPP — Total penalty points
- MPP — Match penalty points

Penalties

- 0 — Won by Fall, Technical Superiority, Passivity, Injury and Forfeit
- 0.5 — Won by Points, 8-11 points difference
- 1 — Won by Points, 1-7 points difference
- 2 — Won by Passivity, the winner is passive too
- 3 — Lost by Points, 1-7 points difference
- 3.5 — Lost by Points, 8-11 points difference
- 4 — Lost by Fall, Technical Superiority, Passivity, Injury and Forfeit

=== Round 1 ===
| TPP | MPP | | Score | | MPP | TPP |
|---|---|---|---|---|---|---|
| 0 | 0 | Sergei Kornilayev (URS) | TF / 2:35 | Jorge Frías (MEX) | 4 | 4 |
| 4 | 4 | Khaled El-Ali El-Rifai (SYR) | TF / 7:53 | Rumen Yordanov (BUL) | 0 | 0 |
| 0 | 0 | László Bíró (HUN) | TF / 4:39 | Nguyễn Văn Công (VIE) | 4 | 4 |
| 3 | 3 | Gheorghe Raşovan (ROU) | 5 - 12 | Mahabir Singh (IND) | 1 | 1 |
| 3 | 3 | Jan Falandys (POL) | 4 - 8 | Claudio Pollio (ITA) | 1 | 1 |
| 0 | 0 | Mohammad Aktar (AFG) | TF / 1:27 | Mohammed Qassim Jabbar (IRQ) | 4 | 4 |
| 4 | 4 | Gombyn Khishigbaatar (MGL) | TF / 7:43 | Jang Se-Hong (PRK) | 0 | 0 |

=== Round 2 ===
| TPP | MPP | | Score | | MPP | TPP |
|---|---|---|---|---|---|---|
| 0 | 0 | Sergei Kornilayev (URS) | TF / 0:44 | Khaled El-Rifai (SYR) | 4 | 8 |
| 5 | 1 | Jorge Frías (MEX) | 12 - 10 | Rumen Yordanov (BUL) | 3 | 3 |
| 4 | 4 | László Bíró (HUN) | TF / 7:18 | Gheorghe Raşovan (ROU) | 0 | 3 |
| 8 | 4 | Nguyen Van Cong (VIE) | TF / 3:56 | Mahabir Singh (IND) | 0 | 1 |
| 3 | 0 | Jan Falandys (POL) | 23 - 0 | Mohammad Aktar (AFG) | 4 | 4 |
| 2 | 1 | Claudio Pollio (ITA) | 17 - 10 | Gombyn Khishigbaatar (MGL) | 3 | 7 |
| 8 | 4 | Mohammed Jabbar (IRQ) | TF / 2:41 | Jang Se-Hong (PRK) | 0 | 0 |

=== Round 3 ===
| TPP | MPP | | Score | | MPP | TPP |
|---|---|---|---|---|---|---|
| 1 | 1 | Sergei Kornilayev (URS) | 8 - 6 | Rumen Yordanov (BUL) | 3 | 6 |
| 8 | 3 | Jorge Frías (MEX) | 11 - 12 | László Bíró (HUN) | 1 | 5 |
| 7 | 4 | Gheorghe Raşovan (ROU) | TF / 1:47 | Jan Falandys (POL) | 0 | 3 |
| 1.5 | 0.5 | Mahabir Singh (IND) | 15 - 5 | Claudio Pollio (ITA) | 3.5 | 5.5 |
| 8 | 4 | Mohammad Aktar (AFG) | TF / 8:30 | Jang Se-Hong (PRK) | 0 | 0 |

=== Round 4 ===
| TPP | MPP | | Score | | MPP | TPP |
|---|---|---|---|---|---|---|
| 1 | 0 | Sergei Kornilayev (URS) | 17 - 4 | László Bíró (HUN) | 4 | 9 |
| 5 | 3.5 | Mahabir Singh (IND) | 5 - 14 | Jan Falandys (POL) | 0.5 | 3.5 |
| 5.5 | 0 | Claudio Pollio (ITA) | DQ / 7:12 | Jang Se-Hong (PRK) | 4 | 4 |

=== Round 5 ===
| TPP | MPP | | Score | | MPP | TPP |
|---|---|---|---|---|---|---|
| 1 | 0 | Sergei Kornilayev (URS) | 21 - 1 | Mahabir Singh (IND) | 4 | 9 |
| 6.5 | 3 | Jan Falandys (POL) | 8 - 13 | Jang Se-Hong (PRK) | 1 | 5 |
| 5.5 | | Claudio Pollio (ITA) | | Bye | | |

=== Final ===
Results from the preliminary round are carried forward into the final (shown in yellow).

| TPP | MPP | | Score | | MPP | TPP |
|---|---|---|---|---|---|---|
| | 0 | Claudio Pollio (ITA) | DQ / 7:12 | Jang Se-Hong (PRK) | 4 | |
| 3 | 3 | Claudio Pollio (ITA) | 1 - 5 | Sergei Kornilayev (URS) | 1 | |
| 4 | 0 | Jang Se-Hong (PRK) | TF / 7:23 | Sergei Kornilayev (URS) | 4 | 5 |

== Final standings ==
1. Claudio Pollio (ITA)
2. Jang Se-Hong (PRK)
3. Sergei Kornilayev (URS)
4. Jan Falandys (POL)
5. Mahabir Singh (IND)
6. László Bíró (HUN)
7. Rumen Yordanov (BUL)
8. Gheorghe Raşovan (ROU)
