= Wrestling at the 1980 Summer Olympics =

Wrestling at the Games of the XXII Olympiad
- Venue: CSKA Sports Complex
- Dates: 20–31 July
- Competitors: 266 from 35 nations

Wrestling at the 1980 Summer Olympics was represented by twenty events (all — men's individual). They were split into two disciplines (ten events each): Freestyle and Greco-Roman. All events were held in the Wrestling hall of the Sports Complex of the Central Sports Club of the Army (north-western part of Moscow) between 20 and 31 July.

== Medal summary ==
=== Freestyle ===
Games	Gold	Silver	Bronze
48 kg	Claudio Pollio; Italy	Jang Se-hong; North Korea	Sergey Kornilaev; Soviet Union
52 kg	Anatoli Beloglazov; Soviet Union	Władysław Stecyk; Poland	Nermedin Selimov; Bulgaria
57 kg	Sergei Beloglazov; Soviet Union	Li Ho-pyong; North Korea	Dugarsürengiin Oyuunbold; Mongolia
62 kg	Magomedgasan Abushev; Soviet Union	Miho Dukov; Bulgaria	Georgios Hatziioannidis; Greece
68 kg	Saipulla Absaidov; Soviet Union	Ivan Yankov; Bulgaria	Šaban Sejdiu; Yugoslavia
74 kg	Valentin Raychev; Bulgaria	Jamtsyn Davaajav; Mongolia	Dan Karabin; Czechoslovakia
82 kg	Ismail Abilov; Bulgaria	Magomedkhan Aratsilov; Soviet Union	István Kovács; Hungary
90 kg	Sanasar Oganisyan; Soviet Union	Uwe Neupert; East Germany	Aleksander Cichoń; Poland
100 kg	Illya Mate; Soviet Union	Slavcho Chervenkov; Bulgaria	Július Strnisko; Czechoslovakia
+100 kg	Soslan Andiyev; Soviet Union	József Balla; Hungary	Adam Sandurski; Poland

=== Greco-Roman ===
Games	Gold	Silver	Bronze
48 kg	Zhaqsylyq Üshkempirov; Soviet Union	Constantin Alexandru; Romania	Ferenc Seres; Hungary
52 kg	Vakhtang Blagidze; Soviet Union	Lajos Rácz; Hungary	Mladen Mladenov; Bulgaria
57 kg	Shamil Serikov; Soviet Union	Józef Lipień; Poland	Benni Ljungbeck; Sweden
62 kg	Stelios Mygiakis; Greece	István Tóth; Hungary	Boris Kramarenko; Soviet Union
68 kg	Ștefan Rusu; Romania	Andrzej Supron; Poland	Lars-Erik Skiöld; Sweden
74 kg	Ferenc Kocsis; Hungary	Anatoly Bykov; Soviet Union	Mikko Huhtala; Finland
82 kg	Gennadi Korban; Soviet Union	Jan Dołgowicz; Poland	Pavel Pavlov; Bulgaria
90 kg	Norbert Növényi; Hungary	Ihar Kanyhin; Soviet Union	Petre Dicu; Romania
100 kg	Georgi Raikov; Bulgaria	Roman Bierła; Poland	Vasile Andrei; Romania
+100 kg	Oleksandr Kolchynskyy; Soviet Union	Aleksandar Tomov; Bulgaria	Hassan Bechara; Lebanon

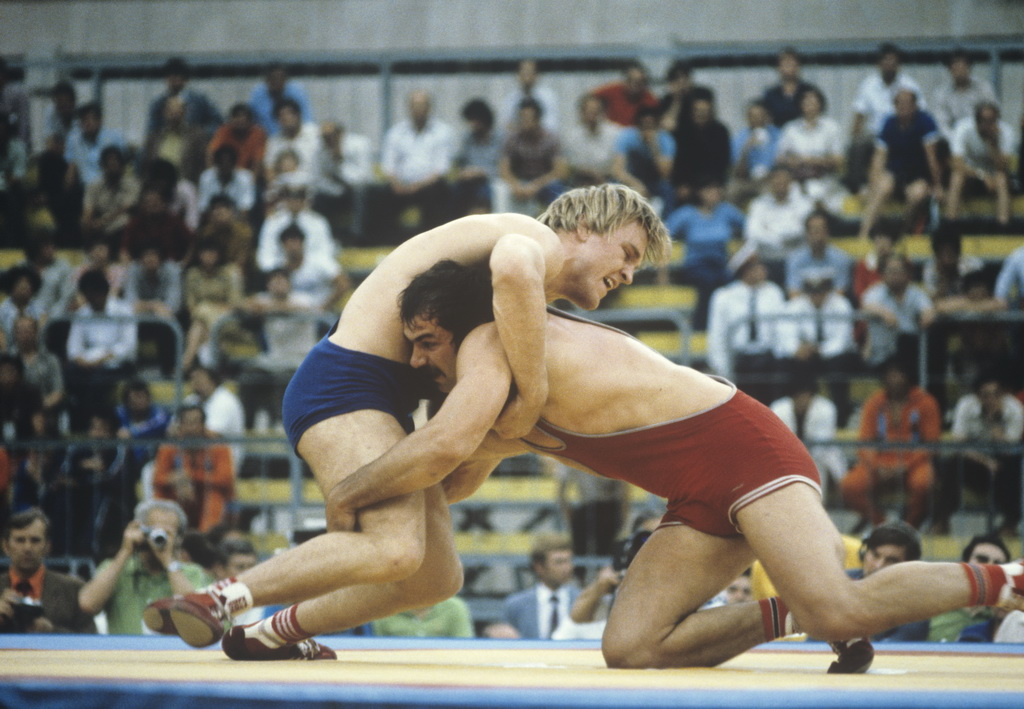
Illya Mate (USSR, in red) and Július Strnisko (Czechoslovakia, in blue) at the 1980 Summer Olympics. RIAN photo.

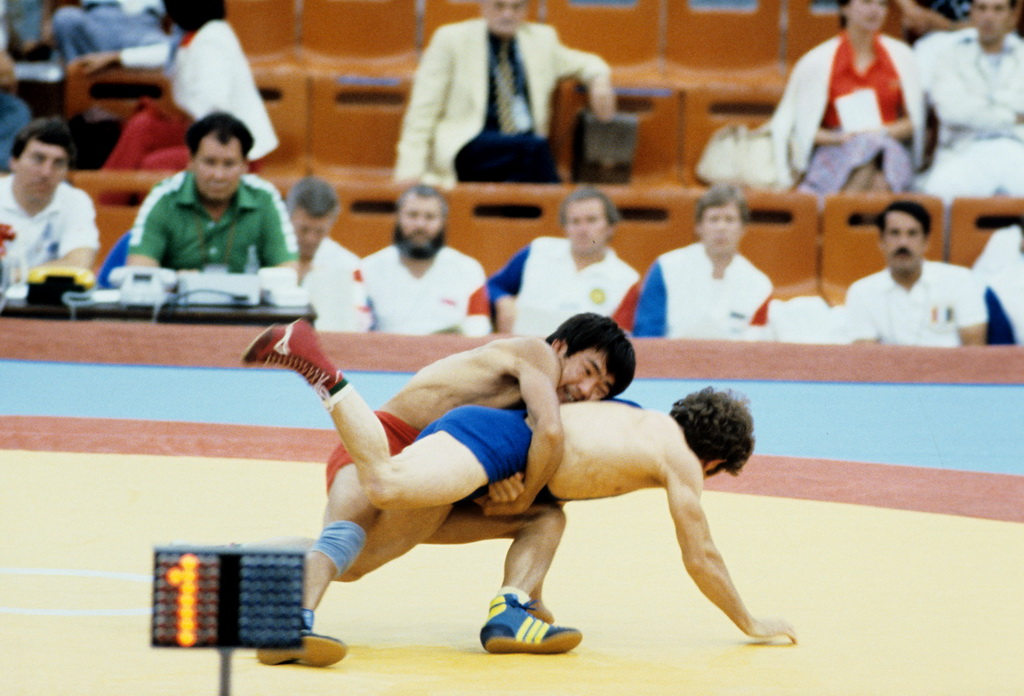
Zhaksylyk Ushkempirov (USSR, in red) and Pavel Hristov (Bulgaria, in blue) at the 1980 Summer Olympics. RIAN photo.

== Medals ==
Rank	Nation	Gold	Silver	Bronze	Total
1	Soviet Union	12	3	2	17
2	Bulgaria	3	4	3	10
3	Hungary	2	3	2	7
4	Romania	1	1	2	4
5	Greece	1	0	1	2
6	Italy	1	0	0	1
7	Poland	0	5	2	7
8	North Korea	0	2	0	2
9	Mongolia	0	1	1	2
10	East Germany	0	1	0	1
11	Czechoslovakia	0	0	2	2
11	Sweden	0	0	2	2
13	Finland	0	0	1	1
13	Lebanon	0	0	1	1
13	Yugoslavia	0	0	1	1
Totals (15 entries)		20	20	20	60

== Participating nations ==
A total of 266 wrestlers from 35 nations competed at the Moscow Games:

- Afghanistan (8)
- Algeria (3)
- Australia (3)
- Austria (5)
- Belgium (3)
- Bulgaria (20)
- Cameroon (6)
- Cuba (10)
- Czechoslovakia (8)
- Denmark (2)
- East Germany (9)
- Finland (8)
- France (2)
- Great Britain (6)
- Greece (5)
- Hungary (19)
- India (6)
- Iraq (9)
- Italy (6)
- Lebanon (1)
- Mexico (2)
- Mongolia (13)
- Nigeria (1)
- North Korea (3)
- Peru (2)
- Poland (20)
- Romania (20)
- Senegal (3)
- Soviet Union (20)
- Spain (2)
- Sweden (8)
- Switzerland (1)
- Syria (17)
- Vietnam (5)
- Yugoslavia (10)

== See also ==
- List of World and Olympic Champions in men's freestyle wrestling
- List of World and Olympic Champions in Greco-Roman wrestling

== Sources ==
- "Wrestling" (PDF). Olympic Review (154). Lausanne: International Olympic Committee: 436–438. August 1980. Archived from the original (pdf) on 2 January 2013.
