= Wrestling at the 1976 Summer Olympics – Men's freestyle 48 kg =

Men's freestyle 48 kg at the Games of the XXI Olympiad
- Venue: Maurice Richard Arena
- Dates: 27–31 July
- Competitors: 18 from 18 nations

Medalists
1st place, gold medalist(s)		Hasan Isaev	Bulgaria
2nd place, silver medalist(s)		Roman Dmitriyev	Soviet Union
3rd place, bronze medalist(s)		Akira Kudo	Japan

The Men's Freestyle 48 kg at the 1976 Summer Olympics as part of the wrestling program were held at the Maurice Richard Arena.

== Medalists ==
Gold	Hasan Isaev; Bulgaria
Silver	Roman Dmitriyev; Soviet Union
Bronze	Akira Kudo; Japan

== Tournament results ==
The competition used a form of negative points tournament, with negative points given for any result short of a fall. Accumulation of 6 negative points eliminated the loser wrestler. When only three wrestlers remain, a special final round is used to determine the order of the medals.

Legend

- TF — Won by Fall
- IN — Won by Opponent Injury
- DQ — Won by Passivity
- D1 — Won by Passivity, the winner is passive too
- D2 — Both wrestlers lost by Passivity
- FF — Won by Forfeit
- DNA — Did not appear
- TPP — Total penalty points
- MPP — Match penalty points

Penalties

- 0 — Won by Fall, Technical Superiority, Passivity, Injury and Forfeit
- 0.5 — Won by Points, 8-11 points difference
- 1 — Won by Points, 1-7 points difference
- 2 — Won by Passivity, the winner is passive too
- 3 — Lost by Points, 1-7 points difference
- 3.5 — Lost by Points, 8-11 points difference
- 4 — Lost by Fall, Technical Superiority, Passivity, Injury and Forfeit

=== Round 1 ===
TPP	MPP		Score		MPP	TPP
4	4	John de Jesús (PUR)	TF / 2:13	Gombyn Khishigbaatar (MGL)	0	0
4	4	Constantin Alexandru (ROU)	TF / 7:52	Kuddusi Özdemir (TUR)	0	0
4	4	William Rosado (USA)	TF / 5:35	Roman Dmitriyev (URS)	0	0
3	3	Mihály Gyulai (HUN)	4 - 10	Ray Takahashi (CAN)	1	1
4	4	Miguel Alonso (CUB)	8 - 25	Hasan Isaev (BUL)	0	0
0	0	Sobhan Rouhi (IRI)	TF / 6:15	Jorge Frias (MEX)	4	4
3	3	Kim Hwa-gyeong (KOR)	10 - 11	Li Yong-nam (PRK)	1	1
4	4	Claudio Pollio (ITA)	TF / 7:14	Akira Kudo (JPN)	0	0
4	4	Jürgen Möbius (GDR)	TF / 4:55	Willi Heckmann (FRG)	0	0

=== Round 2 ===
TPP	MPP		Score		MPP	TPP
8	4	John de Jesus (PUR)	TF / 1:56	Kuddusi Özdemir (TUR)	0	0
1	1	Gombyn Khishigbaatar (MGL)	13 - 11	William Rosado (USA)	3	7
0	0	Roman Dmitriyev (URS)	TF / 8:00	Mihály Gyulai (HUN)	4	7
4.5	3.5	Ray Takahashi (CAN)	2 - 13	Miguel Alonso (CUB)	0.5	4.5
0	0	Hasan Isaev (BUL)	TF / 5:35	Sobhan Rouhi (IRI)	4	4
8	4	Jorge Frías (MEX)	TF / 2:31	Kim Hwa-Kyung (KOR)	0	3
1	0	Li Yong-Nam (PRK)	35 - 7	Claudio Pollio (ITA)	4	8
0	0	Akira Kudo (JPN)	DQ / 6:50	Jürgen Möbius (GDR)	4	8
0		Willi Heckmann (FRG)		Bye		
4		Constantin Alexandru (ROU)		DNA		

=== Round 3 ===
TPP	MPP		Score		MPP	TPP
4	4	Willi Heckmann (FRG)	TF / 7:24	Gombyn Khishigbaatar (MGL)	0	1
4	4	Kuddusi Özdemir (TUR)	DQ / 7:00	Roman Dmitriyev (URS)	0	0
8.5	4	Ray Takahashi (CAN)	3 - 18	Hasan Isaev (BUL)	0	0
8.5	4	Miguel Alonso (CUB)	11 - 38	Kim Hwa-Kyung (KOR)	0	0
5	1	Sobhan Rouhi (IRI)	14 - 13	Li Yong-Nam (PRK)	3	4
0		Akira Kudo (JPN)		Bye		

=== Round 4 ===
TPP	MPP		Score		MPP	TPP
0	0	Akira Kudo (JPN)	25 - 2	Willi Heckmann (FRG)	4	8
2	1	Gombyn Khishigbaatar (MGL)	11 - 11	Kuddusi Özdemir (TUR)	3	7
1	1	Roman Dmitriyev (URS)	9 - 7	Hasan Isaev (BUL)	3	3
9	4	Sobhan Rouhi (IRI)	TF / 2:37	Kim Hwa-Kyung (KOR)	0	3
4		Li Yong-Nam (PRK)		Bye		

=== Round 5 ===
TPP	MPP		Score		MPP	TPP
8	4	Li Yong-Nam (PRK)	2 - 16	Akira Kudo (JPN)	0	0
6	4	Gombyn Khishigbaatar (MGL)	TF / 4:16	Roman Dmitriyev (URS)	0	1
4	1	Hasan Isaev (BUL)	16 - 13	Kim Hwa-Kyung (KOR)	3	6

=== Final ===
Results from the preliminary round are carried forward into the final (shown in yellow).

TPP	MPP		Score		MPP	TPP
	1	Roman Dmitriyev (URS)	9 - 7	Hasan Isaev (BUL)	3	
	4	Akira Kudo (JPN)	D2 / 8:00	Roman Dmitriyev (URS)	4	5
3	0	Hasan Isaev (BUL)	DQ / 7:06	Akira Kudo (JPN)	4	8

== Final standings ==
1. Hasan Isaev (BUL)
2. Roman Dmitriyev (URS)
3. Akira Kudo (JPN)
4. Gombyn Khishigbaatar (MGL)
5. Kim Hwa-Kyung (KOR)
6. Li Yong-Nam (PRK)
7. Kuddusi Özdemir (TUR)
8. Willi Heckmann (FRG)
