= Wrestling at the Friendship Games =

Wrestling at the Friendship Games was contested in three disciplines: freestyle, Greco-Roman and sambo wrestling. Freestyle events took place at the Winter Sports Palace in Sofia, Bulgaria between 20 July and 22 July 1984 (with 80 competitors in 10 events). Greco-Roman events were contested at the Budapest Sportcsarnok in Budapest, Hungary between 13 and 15 July 1984 (with 61 competitors in 10 events). Sambo took part in Ulaanbaatar, Mongolia between 1 and 2 September 1984.

== Medal summary ==
=== Freestyle ===
Event	Gold	Silver	Bronze
48 kg	Kim Cher Huan (PRK)	Sergei Kornilayev (URS)	Jan Falandys (POL)
52 kg	Anatoliy Beloglazov (URS)	Władysław Stecyk (POL)	Lee Cher (PRK)
57 kg	Sergei Beloglazov (URS)	Stefan Ivanov (BUL)	Bernd Bobrich (GDR)
62 kg	Simeon Shterev (BUL)	Avirmediin Enkhee (MGL)	Viktor Alexeev (URS)
68 kg	Arsen Fadzaev (URS)	Kamen Penev (BUL)	Buyandelgeriin Bold (MGL)
74 kg	Taram Magomadov (URS)	Raul Cascaret (CUB)	Luvsangiin Enkhbayar (MGL)
82 kg	Efraim Kamberov (BUL)	Lukhman Dzhabrailov (URS)	Jozef Lohyňa (TCH)
90 kg	Sanasar Oganisyan (URS)	Yordan Doynov (BUL)	Jan Górski (POL)
100 kg	Aslan Khadartsev (URS)	Georgi Jantschev (BUL)	Roland Gehrke (GDR)
+100 kg	Malkhaz Mermanishvili (URS)	Adam Sandurski (POL)	József Balla (HUN)

=== Greco-Roman ===
Event	Gold	Silver	Bronze
48 kg	Bratan Tzenov (BUL)	Csaba Vadász (HUN)	Reinaldo Jimenez (CUB)
52 kg	Benur Pashayan (URS)	Velin Dogandzhiyski (BUL)	Roman Kierpacz (POL)
57 kg	Kamil Fatkulin (URS)	Petar Balov (BUL)	Piotr Michalik (POL)
62 kg	Kamandar Madzhidov (URS)	Zhivko Vangelov (BUL)	Günter Reichelt (GDR)
68 kg	Mikhail Prokudin (URS)	Julius Jasko (TCH)	Jerzy Kopański (POL)
74 kg	Mikhail Mamiashvili (URS)	Andrzej Supron (POL)	Borislav Velichkov (BUL)
82 kg	Taimuraz Apkhasava (URS)	Angel Bonchev (BUL)	Tibor Komáromi (HUN)
90 kg	Igor Kanygin (URS)	Norbert Növényi (HUN)	Jindřich Durčák (TCH)
100 kg	Tamás Gáspár (HUN)	Nikolay Balboshin (URS)	Roman Wrocławski (POL)
+100 kg	Nikola Dinev (BUL)	Candido Mesa (CUB)	Evgeni Artyukhin (URS)

=== Sambo ===
Event	Gold	Silver	Bronze
48 kg	Nurislam Khaliulin (URS)	Ch. Ochirbat (MPR)	Dimitar Dimitrov (PRB)
52 kg	Nanzadyn Büregdaa (MPR)	Sergey Ternovykh (URS)	Rumen Stoilov (PRB)
57 kg	Viktor Astakhov (URS)	Emil Methodiev (PRB)	Khaltmaagiin Battulga (MPR)
62 kg	Aleksandr Aksenov (URS)	P. Botev (PRB)	Sh. Ganbaatar (MPR)
68 kg	Vladimir Panshin (URS)	Galdangin Zhamsran (MPR)	N. Hristov (PRB)
74 kg	Zhambalyn Ganbold (MPR)	Lubomir Delchev (PRB)	Nikolai Vladimirovich Baranov (URS)
82 kg	Guram Chertkoev (URS)	Zunduin Dalgerdalay (MPR)	Anatoly Zhelyazkov (PRB)
90 kg	Odvogin Balzhinnyam (MPR)	Alexander Pushnitsa (URS)	M. Milinin (PRB)
100 kg	Anton Novik (URS)	Khurelbaatar (MPR)	Mitko Stoyanov (PRB)
+100 kg	Vladimir Sobodyrev (URS)	Dagvatserengiin Hadbaatar (MPR)	Marine Gerchev (PRB)

== Medal table ==
* Host nation (People's Republic of Bulgaria, Mongolian People's Republic and Hungarian People's Republic)

Rank	Nation	Gold	Silver	Bronze	Total
1	Soviet Union (URS)	21	5	3	29
2	Bulgaria (BUL)*	4	11	9	24
3	Mongolia (MGL)*	3	6	3	12
4	Hungary (HUN)*	1	2	2	5
5	North Korea (PRK)	1	0	1	2
6	Poland (POL)	0	3	6	9
7	Cuba (CUB)	0	2	1	3
8	Czechoslovakia (TCH)	0	1	2	3
9	East Germany (GDR)	0	0	3	3
Totals (9 entries)		30	30	30	90

== See also ==
- Wrestling at the 1984 Summer Olympics

== Sources ==
- Chmielewski, Zbigniew; et al. (1987). Na olimpijskim szlaku 1984. Sarajewo, Los Angeles (in Polish). Warsaw: Sport i Turystyka. pp. 167–168, 221–222. ISBN 83-217-2610-0.
- Trzciński, Tomasz; et al. (1985). Gwiazdy sportu '84 (in Polish). Warsaw: Krajowa Agencja Wydawnicza. pp. 93–94. ISBN 83-03-01177-4.
