= Jan Falandys =

Polish wrestler (born 1956)

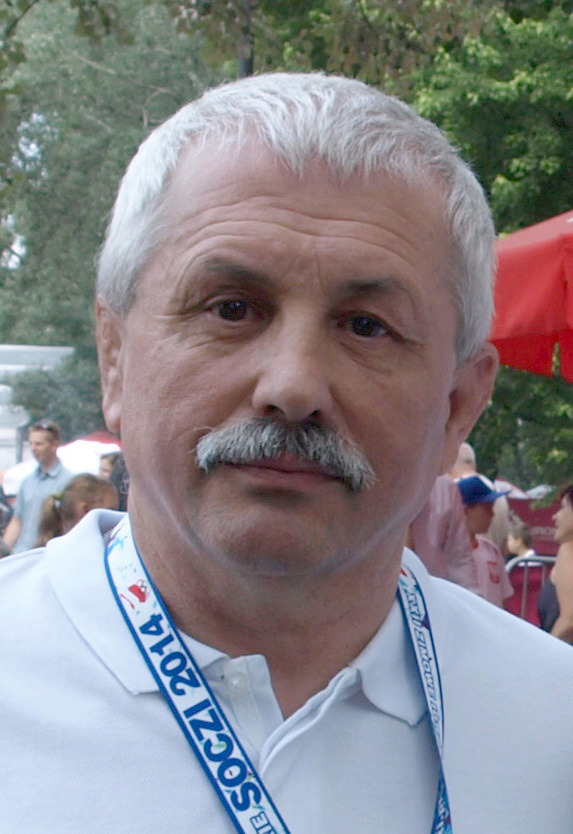
- Falandys in 2013

Personal information
- Born: 18 June 1956 (age 70) Sokołów Małopolski, Poland
- Height: 156 cm (5 ft 1 in)

Sport
- Sport: Freestyle wrestling
- Club: Stal Rzeszów
Medal record
Men's freestyle wrestling
Representing Poland
World Championships
Bronze medal – third place	1979 San Diego	-48 kg
Bronze medal – third place	1983 Kiev	-48 kg
European Championships
Silver medal – second place	1979 Bucharest	-48 kg

Jan Falandys (born 18 June 1956) is a retired light-flyweight freestyle wrestler from Poland. He won bronze medals at the world championships in 1979 and 1983 and placed fourth at the 1980 Summer Olympics.

== 1979 World Championships ==
Flandys competed in the 1979 World Wrestling Championships, representing Poland, and won bronze in the 48 kg category.

1979 World Championship Matches
Round	Opponent	Country	Outcome
1			
2			
3	Bob Weaver	United States	Defeat
4			
5			
Final	Bob Weaver	United States	Defeat

== 1980 Summer Olympics ==
Falandys competed in the freestyle wrestling competition at the 1980 Olympics, and placed 4th overall. He was eliminated from the competition after a defeat to Jang Se-hong, who would place 2nd in the competition.

1980 Olympics Matches
Round	Opponent	Country	Outcome
1	Claudio Pollio	Italy	Defeat
2	Mohammad Aktar	Afghanistan	Victory
3	Gheorghe Rasovan	Romania	Victory
4	Mahabir Singh	India	Victory
5	Jang Se-hong	North Korea	Defeat

== 1983 World Championships ==
Flandys competed in the 1983 World Wrestling Championships, representing Poland, and won bronze in the 48 kg category.

1983 World Championship Matches
Round	Opponent	Country	Outcome
1			
2			
3	Niku Hincu	Romania	Victory
4			
5	Kim Chul-Hwan	North Korea	Defeat
Final	Laszlo Biro	Romania	Victory
