= Wrestling at the 1980 Summer Olympics – Men's freestyle 57 kg =

Men's freestyle 57 kg at the Games of the XXII Olympiad
- Venue: Central Sports Club of the Army
- Dates: 29–31 July 1980
- Competitors: 16 from 16 nations

Medalists
1st place, gold medalist(s)		Sergei Beloglazov	Soviet Union
2nd place, silver medalist(s)		Li Ho-pyong	North Korea
3rd place, bronze medalist(s)		Dugarsürengiin Oyuunbold	Mongolia

The Men's Freestyle 57 kg at the 1980 Summer Olympics as part of the wrestling program were held at the Athletics Fieldhouse, Central Sports Club of the Army.

== Medalists ==
Gold	Sergei Beloglazov; Soviet Union
Silver	Li Ho-pyong; North Korea
Bronze	Dugarsürengiin Oyuunbold; Mongolia

== Tournament results ==
The competition used a form of negative points tournament, with negative points given for any result short of a fall. Accumulation of 6 negative points eliminated the loser wrestler. When only three wrestlers remain, a special final round is used to determine the order of the medals.

Legend

- TF — Won by Fall
- IN — Won by Opponent Injury
- DQ — Won by Passivity
- D1 — Won by Passivity, the winner is passive too
- D2 — Both wrestlers lost by Passivity
- FF — Won by Forfeit
- DNA — Did not appear
- TPP — Total penalty points
- MPP — Match penalty points

Penalties

- 0 — Won by Fall, Technical Superiority, Passivity, Injury and Forfeit
- 0.5 — Won by Points, 8–11 points difference
- 1 — Won by Points, 1–7 points difference
- 2 — Won by Passivity, the winner is passive too
- 3 — Lost by Points, 1–7 points difference
- 3.5 — Lost by Points, 8–11 points difference
- 4 — Lost by Fall, Technical Superiority, Passivity, Injury and Forfeit

=== Round 1 ===
TPP	MPP		Score		MPP	TPP
4	4	Cris Brown (AUS)	TF / 7:41	Li Ho-Pyong (PRK)	0	0
0	0	Wiesław Kończak (POL)	24–3	Amrik Singh Gill (GBR)	4	4
0	0	Sergei Beloglazov (URS)	TF / 4:46	Ivan Tsochev (BUL)	4	4
0	0	Antonio La Bruna (ITA)	DQ / 7:28	Mahmoud El-Messouti (SYR)	4	4
0	0	Sándor Németh (HUN)	TF / 6:48	Karim Salman Muhsin (IRQ)	4	4
0	0	Juan Rodríguez (CUB)	DQ / 7:23	Phạm Văn Tý (VIE)	4	4
1	1	Carlos Hurtado (PER)	12–11	Mohammad Halilula (AFG)	3	3
1	1	Dugarsürengiin Oyuunbold (MGL)	10–10	Aurel Neagu (ROU)	3	3

=== Round 2 ===
TPP	MPP		Score		MPP	TPP
8	4	Cris Brown (AUS)	1–33	Wiesław Kończak (POL)	0	0
0	0	Li Ho-Pyong (PRK)	DQ / 5:03	Amrik Singh Gill (GBR)	4	8
0	0	Sergei Beloglazov (URS)	TF / 2:05	Antonio La Bruna (ITA)	4	4
4	0	Ivan Tsochev (BUL)	TF / 4:26	Mahmoud El-Messouti (SYR)	4	8
1	1	Sándor Németh (HUN)	9–7	Juan Rodríguez (CUB)	3	3
4	0	Karim Muhsin (IRQ)	TF / 5:59	Phạm Văn Tý (VIE)	4	8
5	4	Carlos Hurtado (PER)	TF / 2:08	Dugarsürengiin Oyuunbold (MGL)	0	1
7	4	Mohammad Halilula (AFG)	FF	Aurel Neagu (ROU)	0	3

=== Round 3 ===
TPP	MPP		Score		MPP	TPP
1	1	Li Ho-Pyong (PRK)	9–5	Wiesław Kończak (POL)	3	3
0	0	Sergei Beloglazov (URS)	TF / 1:36	Sándor Németh (HUN)	4	5
4	0	Ivan Tsochev (BUL)	13–1	Antonio La Bruna (ITA)	4	8
4	0	Karim Muhsin (IRQ)	TF / 1:49	Carlos Hurtado (PER)	4	9
7	4	Juan Rodríguez (CUB)	IN / 0:39	Dugarsürengiin Oyuunbold (MGL)	0	1
3		Aurel Neagu (ROU)		Bye		

=== Round 4 ===
TPP	MPP		Score		MPP	TPP
6	3	Aurel Neagu (ROU)	3–10	Li Ho-Pyong (PRK)	1	2
7	4	Wiesław Kończak (POL)	TF / 3:23	Sergei Beloglazov (URS)	0	0
4	0	Ivan Tsochev (BUL)	TF / 6:40	Sándor Németh (HUN)	4	9
8	4	Karim Muhsin (IRQ)	TF / 2:01	Dugarsürengiin Oyuunbold (MGL)	0	1

=== Round 5 ===
TPP	MPP		Score		MPP	TPP
6	4	Li Ho-Pyong (PRK)	TF / 1:12	Sergei Beloglazov (URS)	0	0
7	3	Ivan Tsochev (BUL)	6–9	Dugarsürengiin Oyuunbold (MGL)	1	2

=== Final ===
Results from the preliminary round are carried forward into the final (shown in yellow).

TPP	MPP		Score		MPP	TPP
	4	Li Ho-Pyong (PRK)	TF / 1:12	Sergei Beloglazov (URS)	0	
5	1	Li Ho-Pyong (PRK)	7–7	Dugarsürengiin Oyuunbold (MGL)	3	
0	0	Sergei Beloglazov (URS)	DQ / 7:00	Dugarsürengiin Oyuunbold (MGL)	4	7

== Final standings ==
1. Sergei Beloglazov (URS)
2. Li Ho-Pyong (PRK)
3. Dugarsürengiin Oyuunbold (MGL)
4. Ivan Tsochev (BUL)
5. Aurel Neagu (ROU)
6. Wiesław Kończak (POL)
7. Karim Muhsin (IRQ)
8. Sándor Németh (HUN)
