= Wrestling at the 1980 Summer Olympics – Men's freestyle 90 kg =

Men's freestyle 90 kg at the Games of the XXII Olympiad
- Venue: Central Sports Club of the Army
- Dates: 27–29 July 1980
- Competitors: 15 from 15 nations

Medalists
1st place, gold medalist(s)		Sanasar Oganisyan	Soviet Union
2nd place, silver medalist(s)		Uwe Neupert	East Germany
3rd place, bronze medalist(s)		Aleksander Cichoń	Poland

The Men's Freestyle 90 kg at the 1980 Summer Olympics as part of the wrestling program were held at the Athletics Fieldhouse, Central Sports Club of the Army.

== Medalists ==
Gold	Sanasar Oganisyan; Soviet Union
Silver	Uwe Neupert; East Germany
Bronze	Aleksander Cichoń; Poland

== Tournament results ==
The competition used a form of negative points tournament, with negative points given for any result short of a fall. Accumulation of 6 negative points eliminated the loser wrestler. When only three wrestlers remain, a special final round is used to determine the order of the medals.

Legend

- TF — Won by Fall
- IN — Won by Opponent Injury
- DQ — Won by Passivity
- D1 — Won by Passivity, the winner is passive too
- D2 — Both wrestlers lost by Passivity
- FF — Won by Forfeit
- DNA — Did not appear
- TPP — Total penalty points
- MPP — Match penalty points

Penalties

- 0 — Won by Fall, Technical Superiority, Passivity, Injury and Forfeit
- 0.5 — Won by Points, 8-11 points difference
- 1 — Won by Points, 1-7 points difference
- 2 — Won by Passivity, the winner is passive too
- 3 — Lost by Points, 1-7 points difference
- 3.5 — Lost by Points, 8-11 points difference
- 4 — Lost by Fall, Technical Superiority, Passivity, Injury and Forfeit

=== Round 1 ===
TPP	MPP		Score		MPP	TPP
0	0	Rafael Gómez (CUB)	TF / 4:33	Keith Peache (GBR)	4	4
4	4	Ion Ivanov (ROU)	TF / 2:59	Uwe Neupert (GDR)	0	0
0	0	Christophe Andanson (FRA)	DQ / 7:26	Safaa Ali Nema (IRQ)	4	4
0	0	Dashdorjiin Tserentogtokh (MGL)	DQ / 4:58	Ibrahim Shudzandin (AFG)	4	4
4	4	Amadou Diop (SEN)	TF / 3:58	Aleksander Cichoń (POL)	0	0
4	4	Jean-Claude Biloa (CMR)	DQ / 4:03	Mick Pikos (AUS)	0	0
4	4	Kartar Singh (IND)	DQ / 7:55	Ivan Ginov (BUL)	0	0
0		Sanasar Oganisyan (URS)		Bye		

=== Round 2 ===
TPP	MPP		Score		MPP	TPP
0	0	Sanasar Oganisyan (URS)	DQ / 8:02	Rafael Gómez (CUB)	4	4
8	4	Keith Peache (GBR)	TF / 1:18	Ion Ivanov (ROU)	0	4
0.5	0.5	Uwe Neupert (GDR)	14 - 5	Christophe Andanson (FRA)	3.5	3.5
7	3.5	Safaa Ali Ne'ma (IRQ)	4 - 13	Dashdorjiin Tserentogtokh (MGL)	0.5	0.5
7	3	Ibrahim Shudzandin (AFG)	4 - 7	Amadou Diop (SEN)	1	5
0	0	Aleksander Cichoń (POL)	TF / 2:56	Jean-Claude Biloa (CMR)	4	8
0	0	Mick Pikos (AUS)	TF / 1:00	Kartar Singh (IND)	4	8
0		Ivan Ginov (BUL)		Bye		

=== Round 3 ===
TPP	MPP		Score		MPP	TPP
3	3	Ivan Ginov (BUL)	6 - 12	Sanasar Oganisyan (URS)	1	1
7.5	3.5	Rafael Gómez (CUB)	4 - 15	Ion Ivanov (ROU)	0.5	4.5
0.5	0	Uwe Neupert (GDR)	TF / 3:35	Dashdorjiin Tserentogtokh (MGL)	4	4.5
3.5	0	Christophe Andanson (FRA)	TF / 1:37	Amadou Diop (SEN)	4	9
0	0	Aleksander Cichoń (POL)	DQ / 7:56	Mick Pikos (AUS)	4	4

=== Round 4 ===
TPP	MPP		Score		MPP	TPP
4	1	Ivan Ginov (BUL)	7 - 4	Ion Ivanov (ROU)	3	7.5
2	1	Sanasar Oganisyan (URS)	9 - 9	Uwe Neupert (GDR)	3	3.5
7	3.5	Christophe Andanson (FRA)	1 - 12	Aleksander Cichoń (POL)	0.5	0.5
4.5	0	Dashdorjiin Tserentogtokh (MGL)	TF / 1:42	Mick Pikos (AUS)	4	8

=== Round 5 ===
TPP	MPP		Score		MPP	TPP
7	3	Ivan Ginov (BUL)	3 - 4	Uwe Neupert (GDR)	1	4.5
2	0	Sanasar Oganisyan (URS)	TF / 4:03	Dashdorjiin Tserentogtokh (MGL)	4	8.5
0.5		Aleksander Cichoń (POL)		Bye		

=== Final ===
Results from the preliminary round are carried forward into the final (shown in yellow).

TPP	MPP		Score		MPP	TPP
	1	Sanasar Oganisyan (URS)	9 - 9	Uwe Neupert (GDR)	3	
	3.5	Aleksander Cichoń (POL)	3 - 12	Sanasar Oganisyan (URS)	0.5	1.5
4	1	Uwe Neupert (GDR)	6 - 2	Aleksander Cichoń (POL)	3	6.5

== Final standings ==
1. Sanasar Oganisyan (URS)
2. Uwe Neupert (GDR)
3. Aleksander Cichoń (POL)
4. Ivan Ginov (BUL)
5. Dashdorjiin Tserentogtokh (MGL)
6. Christophe Andanson (FRA)
7. Ion Ivanov (ROU)
8. Mick Pikos (AUS)
