= Wrestling at the 1980 Summer Olympics – Men's freestyle 52 kg =

Men's freestyle 52 kg at the Games of the XXII Olympiad
- Venue: Central Sports Club of the Army
- Dates: 28–30 July 1980
- Competitors: 16 from 16 nations

Medalists
1st place, gold medalist(s)		Anatoli Beloglazov	Soviet Union
2nd place, silver medalist(s)		Władysław Stecyk	Poland
3rd place, bronze medalist(s)		Nermedin Selimov	Bulgaria

The Men's Freestyle 52 kg at the 1980 Summer Olympics as part of the wrestling program were held at the Athletics Fieldhouse, Central Sports Club of the Army.

== Medalists ==
Gold	Anatoli Beloglazov; Soviet Union
Silver	Władysław Stecyk; Poland
Bronze	Nermedin Selimov; Bulgaria

== Tournament results ==
The competition used a form of negative points tournament, with negative points given for any result short of a fall. Accumulation of 6 negative points eliminated the loser wrestler. When only three wrestlers remain, a special final round is used to determine the order of the medals.

Legend

- TF — Won by Fall
- IN — Won by Opponent Injury
- DQ — Won by Passivity
- D1 — Won by Passivity, the winner is passive too
- D2 — Both wrestlers lost by Passivity
- FF — Won by Forfeit
- DNA — Did not appear
- TPP — Total penalty points
- MPP — Match penalty points

Penalties

- 0 — Won by Fall, Technical Superiority, Passivity, Injury and Forfeit
- 0.5 — Won by Points, 8-11 points difference
- 1 — Won by Points, 1-7 points difference
- 2 — Won by Passivity, the winner is passive too
- 3 — Lost by Points, 1-7 points difference
- 3.5 — Lost by Points, 8-11 points difference
- 4 — Lost by Fall, Technical Superiority, Passivity, Injury and Forfeit

=== Round 1 ===
TPP	MPP		Score		MPP	TPP
0	0	Nanzadyn Büregdaa (MGL)	26 - 5	Ahmad Dahrouj (SYR)	4	4
0.5	0.5	Anatoli Beloglazov (URS)	14 - 3	Hartmut Reich (GDR)	3.5	3.5
1	1	Mohamed Hachaichi (ALG)	15 - 8	Nguyễn Kim Thiềng (VIE)	3	3
0	0	Koce Efremov (YUG)	TF / 2:51	Mohammad Aynutdin (AFG)	4	4
4	4	Mark Dunbar (GBR)	TF / 1:40	Nermedin Selimov (BUL)	0	0
3	3	Jang Dok-Ryong (PRK)	7 - 12	Kumar Ashok (IND)	1	1
0	0	Władysław Stecyk (POL)	DQ / 8:08	Petru Ciarnău (ROU)	4	4
4	4	Luis Ocaña (CUB)	TF / 7:09	Lajos Szabó (HUN)	0	0

=== Round 2 ===
TPP	MPP		Score		MPP	TPP
3	3	Nanzadyn Buregdaa (MGL)	4 - 8	Anatoli Beloglazov (URS)	1	1.5
8	4	Ahmad Dahrouj (SYR)	TF / 3:31	Hartmut Reich (GDR)	0	3.5
5	4	Mohamed Hachaichi (ALG)	TF / 4:30	Koce Efremov (YUG)	0	0
7	4	Nguyen Kim Thieng (VIE)	TF / 8:38	Mohammad Aynutdin (AFG)	0	4
8	4	Mark Dunbar (GBR)	2 - 37	Jang Dok-Ryong (PRK)	0	3
0	0	Nermedin Selimov (BUL)	TF / 2:25	Kumar Ashok (IND)	4	5
0	0	Władysław Stecyk (POL)	20 - 3	Luis Ocaña (CUB)	4	8
8	4	Petru Ciarnău (ROU)	TF / 0:27	Lajos Szabó (HUN)	0	0

=== Round 3 ===
TPP	MPP		Score		MPP	TPP
4	1	Nanzadyn Buregdaa (MGL)	12 - 5	Hartmut Reich (GDR)	3	6.5
1.5	0	Anatoli Beloglazov (URS)	TF / 1:22	Mohamed Hachaichi (ALG)	4	9
4	4	Koce Efremov (YUG)	TF / 4:37	Nermedin Selimov (BUL)	0	0
8	4	Mohammad Aynutdin (AFG)	TF / 6:28	Jang Dok-Ryong (PRK)	0	3
9	4	Kumar Ashok (IND)	3 - 17	Władysław Stecyk (POL)	0	0
0		Lajos Szabó (HUN)		Bye		

=== Round 4 ===
TPP	MPP		Score		MPP	TPP
1	1	Lajos Szabó (HUN)	12 - 9	Nanzadyn Buregdaa (MGL)	3	7
1.5	0	Anatoli Beloglazov (URS)	TF / 0:42	Koce Efremov (YUG)	4	8
0.5	0.5	Nermedin Selimov (BUL)	16 - 6	Jang Dok-Ryong (PRK)	3.5	6.5
0		Władysław Stecyk (POL)		Bye		

=== Round 5 ===
TPP	MPP		Score		MPP	TPP
0	0	Władysław Stecyk (POL)	DQ / 8:13	Lajos Szabó (HUN)	4	5
1.5	0	Anatoli Beloglazov (URS)	TF / 1:53	Nermedin Selimov (BUL)	4	4.5

=== Round 6 ===
TPP	MPP		Score		MPP	TPP
4	4	Władysław Stecyk (POL)	TF / 0:57	Anatoli Beloglazov (URS)	0	1.5
9	4	Lajos Szabó (HUN)	3 - 19	Nermedin Selimov (BUL)	0	4.5

=== Final ===
Results from the preliminary round are carried forward into the final (shown in yellow).

TPP	MPP		Score		MPP	TPP
	0	Anatoli Beloglazov (URS)	TF / 1:53	Nermedin Selimov (BUL)	4	
	4	Władysław Stecyk (POL)	TF / 0:57	Anatoli Beloglazov (URS)	0	0
5	1	Władysław Stecyk (POL)	6 - 5	Nermedin Selimov (BUL)	3	7

== Final standings ==
1. Anatoli Beloglazov (URS)
2. Władysław Stecyk (POL)
3. Nermedin Selimov (BUL)
4. Lajos Szabó (HUN)
5. Jang Dok-Ryong (PRK)
6. Nanzadyn Buregdaa (MGL)
7. Koce Efremov (YUG)
8. Hartmut Reich (GDR)
