= Wrestling at the 1980 Summer Olympics – Men's Greco-Roman 48 kg =

Men's Greco-Roman 48 kg at the Games of the XXII Olympiad
- Venue: Central Sports Club of the Army
- Dates: 20–22 July 1980
- Competitors: 10 from 10 nations

Medalists
1st place, gold medalist(s)		Zhaksylyk Ushkempirov	Soviet Union
2nd place, silver medalist(s)		Constantin Alexandru	Romania
3rd place, bronze medalist(s)		Ferenc Seres	Hungary

The Men's Greco-Roman 48 kg at the 1980 Summer Olympics as part of the wrestling program were held at the Athletics Fieldhouse, Central Sports Club of the Army.

== Medalists ==
Gold	Zhaksylyk Ushkempirov; Soviet Union
Silver	Constantin Alexandru; Romania
Bronze	Ferenc Seres; Hungary

== Tournament results ==
The competition used a form of negative points tournament, with negative points given for any result short of a fall. Accumulation of 6 negative points eliminated the loser wrestler. When only three wrestlers remain, a special final round is used to determine the order of the medals.

Legend

- TF — Won by Fall
- IN — Won by Opponent Injury
- DQ — Won by Passivity
- D1 — Won by Passivity, the winner is passive too
- D2 — Both wrestlers lost by Passivity
- FF — Won by Forfeit
- DNA — Did not appear
- TPP — Total penalty points
- MPP — Match penalty points

Penalties

- 0 — Won by Fall, Technical Superiority, Passivity, Injury and Forfeit
- 0.5 — Won by Points, 8-11 points difference
- 1 — Won by Points, 1-7 points difference
- 2 — Won by Passivity, the winner is passive too
- 3 — Lost by Points, 1-7 points difference
- 3.5 — Lost by Points, 8-11 points difference
- 4 — Lost by Fall, Technical Superiority, Passivity, Injury and Forfeit

=== Round 1 ===
TPP	MPP		Score		MPP	TPP
3	3	Vincenzo Maenza (ITA)	9 - 10	Reijo Haaparanta (FIN)	1	1
0	0	Pavel Hristov (BUL)	DQ / 8:16	Kent Andersson (SWE)	4	4
0	0	Alfredo Olvera (MEX)	TF / 4:44	Saber Nakdali (SYR)	4	4
0	0	Ferenc Seres (HUN)	TF / 1:32	Roman Kierpacz (POL)	4	4
3	3	Constantin Alexandru (ROU)	2 - 6	Zhaksylyk Ushkempirov (URS)	1	1

=== Round 2 ===
TPP	MPP		Score		MPP	TPP
6.5	3.5	Vincenzo Maenza (ITA)	4 - 14	Pavel Hristov (BUL)	0.5	0.5
1	0	Reijo Haaparanta (FIN)	TF / 8:36	Kent Andersson (SWE)	4	8
3.5	3.5	Alfredo Olvera (MEX)	5 - 13	Ferenc Seres (HUN)	0.5	0.5
8	4	Saber Nakdali (SYR)	TF / 1:16	Constantin Alexandru (ROU)	0	3
7	3	Roman Kierpacz (POL)	10 - 13	Zhaksylyk Ushkempirov (URS)	1	2

=== Round 3 ===
TPP	MPP		Score		MPP	TPP
5	4	Reijo Haaparanta (FIN)	0 - 27	Pavel Hristov (BUL)	0	0.5
7.5	4	Alfredo Olvera (MEX)	TF / 2:29	Constantin Alexandru (ROU)	0	3
4	3.5	Ferenc Seres (HUN)	6 - 17	Zhaksylyk Ushkempirov (URS)	0.5	2.5

=== Round 4 ===
TPP	MPP		Score		MPP	TPP
9	4	Reijo Haaparanta (FIN)	2 - 17	Ferenc Seres (HUN)	0	4
4.5	4	Pavel Hristov (BUL)	DQ / 7:34	Constantin Alexandru (ROU)	2	5
2.5		Zhaksylyk Ushkempirov (URS)		Bye		

=== Round 5 ===
TPP	MPP		Score		MPP	TPP
3.5	1	Zhaksylyk Ushkempirov (URS)	12 - 7	Pavel Hristov (BUL)	3	7.5
7	3	Ferenc Seres (HUN)	5 - 10	Constantin Alexandru (ROU)	1	6

=== Final ===
Results from the preliminary round are carried forward into the final (shown in yellow).

TPP	MPP		Score		MPP	TPP
	3	Constantin Alexandru (ROU)	2 - 6	Zhaksylyk Ushkempirov (URS)	1	
	3.5	Ferenc Seres (HUN)	6 - 17	Zhaksylyk Ushkempirov (URS)	0.5	1.5
6.5	3	Ferenc Seres (HUN)	5 - 10	Constantin Alexandru (ROU)	1	4

== Final standings ==
1. Zhaksylyk Ushkempirov (URS)
2. Constantin Alexandru (ROU)
3. Ferenc Seres (HUN)
4. Pavel Hristov (BUL)
5. Reijo Haaparanta (FIN)
6. Alfredo Olvera (MEX)
7. Vincenzo Maenza (ITA)
8. Roman Kierpacz (POL)
