= 1981 World Wrestling Championships =

Freestyle
- Host city: (Socialist Federal Republic of Yugoslavia) Skopje, Yugoslavia
- Dates: 11–13 September 1981

Greco-Roman
- Host city: Oslo, Norway
- Dates: 28–30 August 1981

Champions
- Freestyle: Soviet Union
- Greco-Roman: Soviet Union

The following is the final results of the 1981 World Wrestling Championships. Freestyle competition were held in Skopje, Yugoslavia (present-day North Macedonia) and Greco-Roman competition were held in Oslo, Norway.

== Medal table ==
Rank	Nation	Gold	Silver	Bronze	Total
1	Soviet Union	12	0	4	16
2	West Germany	2	0	0	2
3	Bulgaria	1	5	1	7
4	Yugoslavia	1	2	1	4
5	Japan	1	1	2	4
5	United States	1	1	2	4
7	East Germany	1	1	1	3
7	Hungary	1	1	1	3
9	Finland	0	2	2	4
9	Poland	0	2	2	4
11	Czechoslovakia	0	1	0	1
11	Iran	0	1	0	1
11	South Korea	0	1	0	1
11	Sweden	0	1	0	1
11	Turkey	0	1	0	1
16	Romania	0	0	2	2
17	Austria	0	0	1	1
17	Mongolia	0	0	1	1
Totals (18 entries)		20	20	20	60

== Team ranking ==
Rank	Men's freestyle		Men's Greco-Roman	
Rank	Team	Points	Team	Points
1	Soviet Union	42	Soviet Union	49
2	Bulgaria	33	Hungary	23
3	United States	28	Finland	21
4	East Germany	17	Bulgaria	18
5	Iran	17	Poland	17
6	Japan	15	Yugoslavia	15

== Medal summary ==
=== Freestyle ===
Event	Gold	Silver	Bronze
48 kg	Sergey Kornilaev; Soviet Union	Son Gab-do; South Korea	William Rosado; United States
52 kg	Toshio Asakura; Japan	Hartmut Reich; East Germany	Nanzadyn Büregdaa; Mongolia
57 kg	Sergey Beloglazov; Soviet Union	Stefan Ivanov; Bulgaria	Hideaki Tomiyama; Japan
62 kg	Simeon Shterev; Bulgaria	Marian Skubacz; Poland	Viktor Alekseev; Soviet Union
68 kg	Saypulla Absaidov; Soviet Union	Šaban Sejdiu; Yugoslavia	Kamen Penev; Bulgaria
74 kg	Martin Knosp; West Germany	Valentin Raychev; Bulgaria	Leroy Kemp; United States
82 kg	Chris Campbell; United States	Efraim Kamberov; Bulgaria	Grigory Danko; Soviet Union
90 kg	Sanasar Oganisyan; Soviet Union	Ivan Ginov; Bulgaria	Uwe Neupert; East Germany
100 kg	Roland Gehrke; East Germany	Greg Gibson; United States	Ilya Mate; Soviet Union
+100 kg	Salman Khasimikov; Soviet Union	Reza Soukhtehsaraei; Iran	Adam Sandurski; Poland

=== Greco-Roman ===
Event	Gold	Silver	Bronze
48 kg	Zhaksylyk Ushkempirov; Soviet Union	Salih Bora; Turkey	Fumikazu Sasaki; Japan
52 kg	Vakhtang Blagidze; Soviet Union	Atsuji Miyahara; Japan	Lajos Rácz; Hungary
57 kg	Pasquale Passarelli; West Germany	Josef Krysta; Czechoslovakia	Ilpo Seppälä; Finland
62 kg	István Tóth; Hungary	Ryszard Świerad; Poland	Pertti Ukkola; Finland
68 kg	Gennady Ermilov; Soviet Union	Tapio Sipilä; Finland	Ștefan Rusu; Romania
74 kg	Aleksandr Kudryavtsev; Soviet Union	Mikko Huhtala; Finland	Karolj Kasap; Yugoslavia
82 kg	Gennady Korban; Soviet Union	Momir Petković; Yugoslavia	Ion Draica; Romania
90 kg	Igor Kanygin; Soviet Union	Frank Andersson; Sweden	Franz Pitschmann; Austria
100 kg	Mikhail Saladze; Soviet Union	Tamás Gáspár; Hungary	Roman Wrocławski; Poland
+100 kg	Refik Memišević; Yugoslavia	Nikola Dinev; Bulgaria	Evgeny Artyukhin; Soviet Union
