= Granik =

Granik is a surname. Notable people with the surname include:

- Debra Granik (born 1963), American filmmaker
- Russ Granik (born 1948), American sports executive

== See also ==
- Granit (name)
