= 1982 World Sambo Championships =

Sambo competitions

The 1982 World Sambo Championships were held in Paris, France, in July 1982. Championships were organized by FILA.

== Medal overview ==
men	Gold	Silver	Bronze
-48 kg	(Soviet Union) Andrey Khodyrev (URS)^{RUS}	(Mongolia) Dunkhüügiin Tegshee (MGL)	(Italy) Angelo Arlandi (ITA)
-52 kg	(Mongolia) Nanzadyn Büregdaa (MGL)	(Soviet Union) Vladimir Belov (URS)^{RUS}	(Bulgaria) Georgi Yusev (BUL)
-57 kg	(Soviet Union) Viktor Astakhov (URS)^{RUS}	(France) René Rambier (FRA)	(Spain) Miguel Ángel García (ESP)
-62 kg	(Soviet Union) Yevgeny Yesin (URS)^{RUS}	(Bulgaria) Valentin Minev (BUL)	(Mongolia) Galdangiin Jamsran (MGL)
-68 kg	(Bulgaria) Georgi Tsvetkov (BUL)	(Soviet Union) Rafik Madyarov (URS)^{RUS}	(Mongolia) Tsendiin Damdin (MGL)
-74 kg	(Mongolia) Jambalyn Ganbold (MGL)	(Spain) Jon Idarreta (ESP)	(Soviet Union) Roman Basirov (URS)^{RUS}
-82 kg	(Soviet Union) Magomed Ramazanov (URS)^{BLR}	(France) Joseppino Massida (FRA)	(Mongolia) Zunduyn Delgerdalay (MGL)
-90 kg	(Soviet Union) Valery Pashkin (URS)^{RUS}	(Mongolia) Dambajavyn Tsend-Ayuush (MGL)	(Spain) José Valero (ESP)
-100 kg	(United States) Greg Gibson (USA)	(Soviet Union) Gennady Malenkin (URS)^{RUS}	(Bulgaria) I. Iliev (BUL)
+100 kg	(Soviet Union) Vitaly Kuznetsov (URS)^{RUS}	(Spain) Pedro Soler (ESP)	(Netherlands) Chris Dolman (NED)
