= 1981 World Sambo Championships =

Sambo competitions

The 1981 World Sambo Championships were held in Madrid, Spain on February/March 1981. Championships were organized by FILA.

== Medal overview ==
men	Gold	Silver	Bronze
-48 kg	(Soviet Union) Andrey Khodyrev (URS)^{RUS}	(Mongolia) Dunkhüügiin Tegshee (MGL)	(Japan) Nishi (JPN)
-52 kg	(Soviet Union) Mukhamed Khallyyev (URS)^{KGZ}	(Mongolia) Nanzadyn Büregdaa (MGL)	(Bulgaria) Georgi Yusev (BUL)
-57 kg	(Soviet Union) Viktor Astakhov (URS)^{RUS}	(Bulgaria) S. Saladinov (BUL)	(Venezuela) Ochoa (VEN)
-62 kg	(Soviet Union) Garnik Ovanesyan (URS)^{ARM}	(Mongolia) Galdangiin Jamsran (MGL)	(Japan) Ituya (JPN)
-68 kg	(Soviet Union) Mykhaylo Levitsky (URS)^{UKR}	(Mongolia) Tsendiin Damdin (MGL)	(Spain) José Campo (ESP)
-74 kg	(Mongolia) Ravdangiin Davaadalay (MGL)	(Soviet Union) Nikolay Baranov (URS)^{RUS}	(Japan) Yamada (JPN)
-82 kg	(Spain) José Antonio Cecchini (ESP)	(Soviet Union) Magomed Ramazanov (URS)^{BLR}	(Mongolia) Zunduyn Delgerdalay (MGL)
-90 kg	(Mongolia) Dambajavyn Tsend-Ayuush (MGL)	(Soviet Union) Alexander Pushnitsa (URS)^{RUS}	(Japan) Sakamoto (JPN)
-100 kg	(Soviet Union) Gennady Malenkin (URS)^{RUS}	(Spain) Santiago Morales (ESP)	(Netherlands) Henk Numan (NED)
+100 kg	(Soviet Union) Vladimir Sobodyrev (URS)^{UZB}	(Netherlands) Chris Dolman (NED)	(Japan) Yakokura (JPN)
