= Rafael Gómez =

Rafael Gómez may refer to:

- Rafael Gómez Ortega (1882–1960), Spanish bullfighter
- Rafael Gómez Nieto (1921–2020), Spanish soldier and veteran
- Rafael Gómez (wrestler) (born 1960), Cuban wrestler
- Rafe Gomez (born 1960), American business writer and DJ
- Rafael Gómez (golfer) (born 1967), Argentine golfer
- Rafa Gómez (footballer, born 1974), Spanish football goalkeeper
- Rafa Gómez (footballer, born 1983), Spanish football forward
- Sijo Gómez (Rafael Emilio Gómez, born 1900), Dominican baseball player

== See also ==
- Rafael Gomes (born 1980), Brazilian football defender
- Rafaela Gómez (born 1997), Ecuadorian tennis player
