= 1983 World Sambo Championships =

Sambo competitions

- Location: KIEV

The 1983 World Sambo Championships were held in Kiev, Soviet Union in September/October 1983. Championships were organized by FILA.

== Medal overview ==
men	Gold	Silver	Bronze
-48 kg	(Soviet Union) Nurislam Khaliulin (URS)^{RUS}	(Bulgaria) Dimitar Dimitrov (BUL)	(Mongolia) Dunkhüügiin Tegshee (MGL)
-52 kg	(Mongolia) Khaltmaagiin Battulga (MGL)	(Soviet Union) Gennady Beloglazov (URS)^{RUS}	(Bulgaria) Emil Metodiev (BUL)
-57 kg	(Spain) Miguel Ángel García (ESP)	(Soviet Union) Aleksandr Aksenov (URS)^{RUS}	(Bulgaria) A. Petrov (BUL)
-62 kg	(Bulgaria) Valentin Minev (BUL)	(Soviet Union) Khusein Marayev (URS)^{RUS}	(Mongolia) G. Khurulbaatar (MGL)
-68 kg	(Mongolia) Galdangiin Jamsran (MGL)	(Soviet Union) Mychaylo Levitsky (URS)^{UKR}	(Italy) D. Manzzo (ITA)
-74 kg	(Soviet Union) Nikolay Baranov (URS)^{RUS}	(Mongolia) Tsendiin Damdin (MGL)	(Bulgaria) L. Delchev (BUL)
-82 kg	(Soviet Union) Arkady Buzin (URS)^{RUS}	(Mongolia) Zunduyn Delgerdalay (MGL)	(Bulgaria) P. Milikin (BUL)
-90 kg	(Soviet Union) Alexander Pushnitsa (URS)^{RUS}	(United States) Michael Gatling (USA)	(Mongolia) Dambajavyn Tsend-Ayuush (MGL)
-100 kg	(Soviet Union) Mikhail Baranov (URS)^{BLR}	(Mongolia) Odvogiin Baljinnyam (MGL)	(Italy) Giorgio D'Alessandro (ITA)
+100 kg	(Soviet Union) Vladimir Sobodyrev (URS)^{UZB}	(Mongolia) Sarangereliin Khürelbaatar (MGL)	(Bulgaria) Marin Gerchev (BUL)
