= Stal Rzeszów =

Stal Rzeszów may refer to:

- Stal Rzeszów (multi-sports club)
- Stal Rzeszów (football)
- Stal Rzeszów (motorcycle speedway)
