= Haaparanta =

Haaparanta may refer to:

== Places ==
- Haparanda Municipality in northern Sweden, also named Haaparanta in Finnish
- Haparanda, the seat of Haparanda Municipality

== People ==
- Leila Haaparanta (born 1954), Finnish philosopher
- Mikko Haaparanta (born 1997), Finnish hockey player
- Reijo Haaparanta (born 1958), Finnish wrestler
