= Christophe Andanson =

French wrestler

Personal information
- Nationality: French
- Born: 12 July 1957 (age 67)

Sport
- Sport: Wrestling

Christophe Andanson (born 12 July 1957) is a French wrestler. He competed in two events at the 1980 Summer Olympics.
