= 1979 World Sambo Championships =

Sambo competitions

The 1979 World Sambo Championships were held in Madrid, Spain on December 11 to 14 1979. Championships were organized by FILA.

== Medal overview ==
men	Gold	Silver	Bronze
-48 kg	(Mongolia) Dunkhüügiin Tegshee (MGL)	(Soviet Union) Nurislam Khaliulin (URS)^{RUS}	(Bulgaria) Ivan Paraskov (BUL)
-52 kg	(Soviet Union) Yury Kruglov (URS)^{RUS}	(Bulgaria) Georgi Yusev (BUL)	(Japan) K. Saito (JPN)
-57 kg	(Soviet Union) Khalim Gareyev (URS)^{RUS}	(Mongolia) Yandzhmaagiin Dorj (MGL)	(Bulgaria) A. Andopov (BUL)
-62 kg	(Soviet Union) Yevgeny Yesin (URS)^{RUS}	(Mongolia) Galdangiin Jamsran (MGL)	(Bulgaria) Valentin Minev (BUL)
-68 kg	(Mongolia) Tsendiin Damdin (MGL)	(Soviet Union) Konstantin Gerasimov (URS)^{RUS}	(Bulgaria) Georgi Tsvetkov (BUL)
-74 kg	(Soviet Union) Nikolay Baranov (URS)^{RUS}	(Mongolia) Ravdangiin Davaadalay (MGL)	(Japan) J. Watanabe (JPN)
-82 kg	(Spain) José Antonio Cecchini (ESP)	(Bulgaria) Georgi Petrov (BUL)	(United States) Dan Lewis (USA)
-90 kg	(Soviet Union) Alexander Pushnitsa (URS)^{RUS}	(Mongolia) Dambajavyn Tsend-Ayuush (MGL)	(Bulgaria) G. Chervenkov (BUL)
-100 kg	(Soviet Union) Gennady Malenkin (URS)^{RUS}	(Spain) Miguel Tejera (ESP)	(Bulgaria) Delcho Kolev (BUL)
+100 kg	(Soviet Union) Vladimir Shkalov (URS)^{RUS}	(Bulgaria) Dimitar Zapryanov (BUL)	(United States) Carl Dambman (USA)
