= Phạm Văn Tý =

Vietnamese wrestler

Personal information
- Nationality: Vietnamese
- Born: 15 May 1955 (age 71)

Sport
- Sport: Wrestling

Phạm Văn Tý (born 15 May 1955) is a Vietnamese wrestler. He competed in the men's freestyle 57 kg at the 1980 Summer Olympics.
