= Kim Hwa-kyung =

South Korean wrestler (born 1949)

Personal information
- Nationality: South Korean
- Born: 18 July 1949 (age 76)

Sport
- Sport: Wrestling
Medal record
Men's freestyle wrestling
Representing South Korea
Asian Games
Bronze medal – third place	1970 Bangkok	48 kg
Bronze medal – third place	1978 Bangkok	48 kg

Kim Hwa-kyung (born 18 July 1949) is a South Korean wrestler. He competed in the men's freestyle 48 kg at the 1976 Summer Olympics.
