= Kuddusi Özdemir =

Turkish wrestler

Personal information
- Nationality: Turkish
- Born: 1956 (age 69–70)

Sport
- Sport: Wrestling

Kuddusi Özdemir (born 1956) is a Turkish wrestler. He competed in the men's freestyle 48 kg at the 1976 Summer Olympics.
