= Ahmad Dahrouj =

Syrian wrestler

Personal information
- Nationality: Syrian
- Born: 15 March 1952 (age 74)

Sport
- Sport: Wrestling

Ahmad Dahrouj (born 15 March 1952) is a Syrian wrestler. He competed in the men's freestyle 52 kg at the 1980 Summer Olympics, losing both his matches.
