= Khaled El-Ali El-Rifai =

Syrian wrestler

Personal information
- Nationality: Syrian
- Born: 9 August 1955 (age 70)

Sport
- Sport: Wrestling

Khaled El-Ali El-Rifai (born 9 August 1955) is a Syrian wrestler. He competed in the men's freestyle 48 kg at the 1980 Summer Olympics, and lost both of his matches.
