= John de Jesús =

Puerto Rican wrestler

Personal information
- Nationality: Puerto Rican
- Born: 3 June 1955 (age 71)

Sport
- Sport: Wrestling

John de Jesús (born 3 June 1955) is a Puerto Rican wrestler. He competed in the men's freestyle 48 kg at the 1976 Summer Olympics.
