= Ri Yong-nam =

North Korean wrestler

Personal information
- Nationality: North Korean
- Born: 4 June 1956 (age 70)

Deputy of the Supreme People's Assembly from the 18th constituency
- Incumbent
- Assumed office 21 March 2026

Sport
- Sport: Wrestling

Ri Yong-nam (born 4 June 1956) is a North Korean wrestler and politician. He competed in the men's freestyle 48 kg at the 1976 Summer Olympics. Later on, in the 2026 North Korean parliamentary election, he was elected to represent the 18th constituency in the Supreme People's Assembly.
