= Jean-Claude Biloa =

Cameroonian wrestler (born 1949)

Personal information
- Nationality: Cameroonian
- Born: 3 August 1949 (age 76)

Sport
- Sport: Wrestling

Achievements and titles
- Olympic finals: 1980 Summer Olympics

Jean-Claude Biloa (born 3 August 1949) is a Cameroonian wrestler. He competed in the men's freestyle 90 kg at the 1980 Summer Olympics.
