= Mihály Gyulai =

Hungarian wrestler

Personal information
- Nationality: Hungarian
- Born: 2 November 1953 Budapest, Hungary
- Died: September 1994 (aged 40)

Sport
- Sport: Wrestling

Mihály Gyulai (2 November 1953 – September 1994) was a Hungarian wrestler. He competed in the men's freestyle 48 kg at the 1976 Summer Olympics.
