= Nanzadyn Büregdaa =

Mongolian wrestler

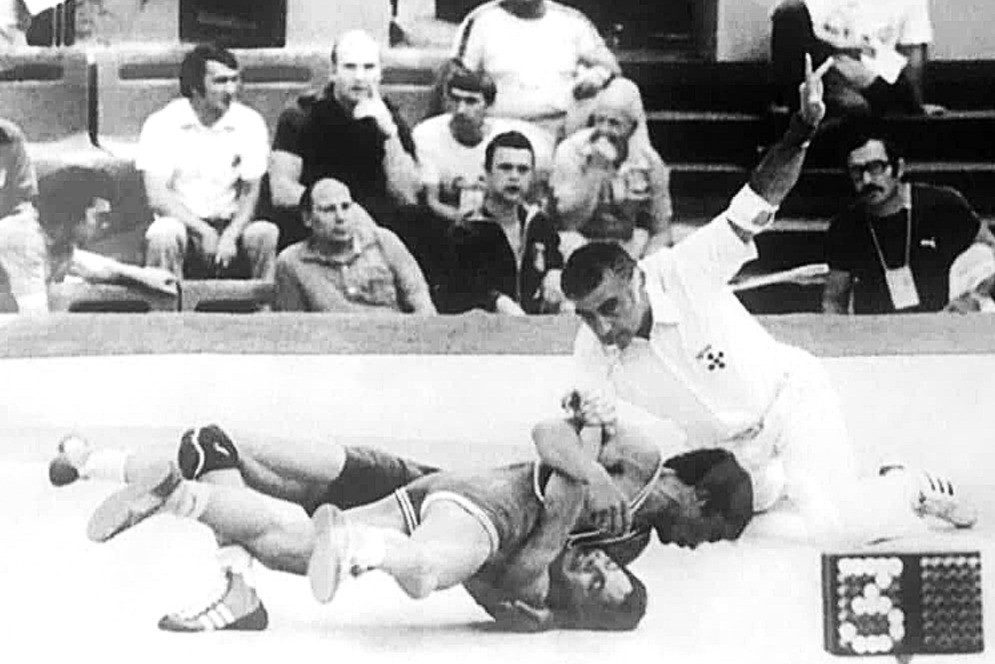

Personal information
- Native name: Нанзадын Бүрэгдаа
- Nationality: Mongolian
- Born: 9 May 1953 (age 73) Govi-Altai, Delger
- Education: Mongolian State University of Education Academy of Management, specializing in Public Administration.

Sport
- Country: Mongolia
- Sport: Freestyle wrestling, sambo
- Position: Taigam Altai Group” LLC — General Director Serkh-Taigam Group" LLC — General Director
- Weight class: 52 kg
Medal record
Representing Mongolia
Men's freestyle wrestling
World Championships
Bronze medal – third place	1981 Skopje	52 kg
World Cup
Silver medal – second place	1986 Toledo	52 kg
Bronze medal – third place	1981 Toledo	52 kg
Men's sambo
World Championships
Silver medal – second place	1981 Madrid	52 kg
Gold medal – first place	1982 Paris	52 kg
Friendship Games
Gold medal – first place	1984 Ulaanbaatar	52 kg

Nanzadyn Büregdaa (born 9 May 1953) is a Mongolian wrestler. He competed in the men's freestyle 52 kg at the 1980 Summer Olympics, placing sixth. He won gold in sambo at the 1982 World Championships and Friendship Games in 1984. Honored Athlete of Mongolia Nanzadyn Burgedaa was born on May 9, 1953, at Bazgiin Khudag, Delger sum, Gobi-Altai Province, as the second son of Nanzad. He has three siblings:

- Elder brother N. Jalbajav — former Member of Parliament, Advisor to the Minister of Defense, Major General, Honorary Doctor and Professor of the Military Institute.
- Younger sister N. Lida — Leading Physics and Mathematics teacher of Mongolia.
- Younger brother N. Namsrai — served as a UN Peacekeeper (“Blue Helmet”) in international peacekeeping operations in Iraq.

Burgedaa graduated from the Mongolian State University of Education in 1985 with a degree in Physical Education (as a coach and teacher), and later completed the Academy of Management, specializing in Public Administration. He holds a Doctorate in Education. Nanzadyn Burgedaa is a ten-time national champion of Mongolia and has won around 50 medals from international competitions, making him one of Mongolia’s most accomplished and respected athletes, coaches, and sports leaders. From 1979 to 1998, he was a member of Mongolia’s national freestyle wrestling team. From 1998 to 2000, he served as a coach and trainer in both domestic and international sports organizations. From 2000 to 2011, he was Director of “Taigam Altai” LLC, a company active in construction, road building, and production services. Since 2011, he has been the General Director of “Taigam Altai Group” LLC.

He used to serve as:

- Vice President of the Mongolian Freestyle Wrestling Federation,
- Advisor Coach to the Men’s National Team,
- Advisor to the Ministry of Health and Sports.

== Athletic Achievements ==
- 1980 – 5th place at the XXII Moscow Summer Olympic Games (freestyle wrestling)
- 1981 – Silver Medal at the Freestyle Wrestling World Cup
- 1985 – Bronze Medal at the Freestyle Wrestling World Cup
- 1983, 1985 – 5th place at the World Wrestling Championships
- 1981 – Silver Medal at the World Sambo Championships
- 1982 – Gold Medal at the World Sambo Championships
- 1984 – Gold Medal at the International Friendship-84 Tournament

== Titles and Honors ==
- Honored Athlete of Mongolia
- Honored Athlete of the Republic of Buryatia (Russia)
- Order of the Red Banner of Labor
- Order of the Polar Star (Altan Gadas)
- Medal of Labor Honor
- 800th Anniversary Medal of the Great Mongol Empire
- Government Honorary Certificate
- Olympic Committee’s “Aldan Ochir” Medal
