= Akira Kudo =

Japanese freestyle wrestler

Personal information
- Born: 1 January 1954 (age 72) Iwate Prefecture, Japan
Medal record
Men's freestyle wrestling
Representing Japan
Olympic Games
Bronze medal – third place	1976 Montreal	light flyweight
World Cup
Gold medal – first place	1973 Toledo	light flyweight

Akira Kudo (工藤 章, born 1 January 1954 in Iwate Prefecture) is a Japanese former wrestler who competed in the 1976 Summer Olympics.
