= Safaa Ali Nema =

Iraqi wrestler

Personal information
- Nationality: Iraqi
- Born: 1959 (age 66–67)

Sport
- Sport: Wrestling

Safaa Ali Nema (Arabic: صفاء علي نعمة, born 1959) is an Iraqi wrestler. He competed in the men's freestyle 90 kg at the 1980 Summer Olympics.
