= Willi Heckmann =

German wrestler

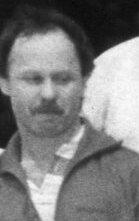
- Heckmann in 1988

Personal information
- Nationality: German
- Born: 23 February 1952 (age 74) Nußloch, Germany

Sport
- Sport: Wrestling

Willi Heckmann (born 23 February 1952) is a German former wrestler. He competed in the men's freestyle 48 kg at the 1976 Summer Olympics.
