= Juan Rodríguez (wrestler) =

Cuban wrestler

Personal information
- Nationality: Cuban
- Born: 23 May 1958 (age 68)

Sport
- Sport: Wrestling

Juan Rodríguez (born 23 May 1958) is a Cuban wrestler. He competed in the men's freestyle 57 kg at the 1980 Summer Olympics.
