= Lajos Szabó (wrestler) =

Hungarian wrestler

Personal information
- Nationality: Hungarian
- Born: 23 April 1956 (age 70) Berettyóújfalu, Hungary

Sport
- Sport: Wrestling

Lajos Szabó (born 23 April 1956) is a Hungarian wrestler. He competed in the men's freestyle 52 kg at the 1980 Summer Olympics.
