= Hasan Isaev =

Bulgarian wrestler (born 1952)

Medal record

Men's freestyle wrestling

Representing Bulgaria

Olympic Games
Gold medal – first place	1976 Montreal	48 kg

Hasan Isaev (Bulgarian: Хасан Исаев; born November 9, 1952) is a Bulgarian freestyle wrestler. He became Olympic champion in 1976 in the freestyle light flyweight class.
