= Mahmoud El-Messouti =

Syrian wrestler

Personal information
- Nationality: Syrian
- Born: 17 April 1960 (age 66)

Sport
- Sport: Wrestling

Mahmoud El-Messouti (born 17 April 1960) is a Syrian wrestler. He competed in the men's freestyle 57 kg at the 1980 Summer Olympics, where he lost both of his matches.
