= Rumen Yordanov =

Bulgarian wrestler

Personal information
- Nationality: Bulgarian
- Born: 17 October 1957 Popovo, Bulgaria
- Died: 2 August 2010 (aged 52)

Sport
- Sport: Wrestling

Rumen Yordanov (17 October 1957 – 2 August 2010) was a Bulgarian wrestler. He competed in the men's freestyle 48 kg at the 1980 Summer Olympics.
