= Alexander Pushnitsa =

Russian sambo practitioner (1949–2023)

Alexander Pushnitsa Александр Пушница
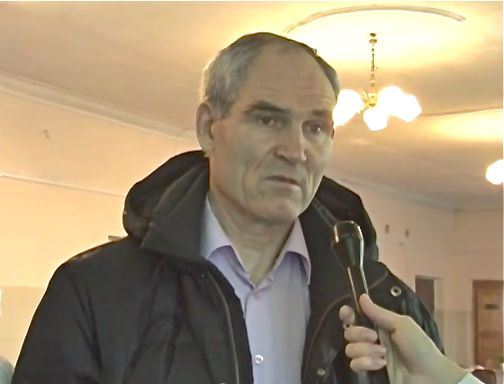
- Pushnitsa in 2013
- Born: 1 November 1949; Korenovo, Vengerovsky District, Novosibirsk Oblast, Russian SFSR, Soviet Union
- Died: 27 January 2023 (aged 73); Omsk, Russia
- Nationality: Russian
- Height: 184 cm (6 ft 0 in)
- Weight: 90–100 kg (198–220 lb; 14 st 2 lb – 15 st 10 lb)
- Division: Light heavyweight
- Style: Sambo
- Team: Dynamo
- Trainer: Savely Galkin, Vasily Grozin (Solovyov)
- Rank: Merited Master of Sports of the USSR
- Years active: 1968–1988

Alexander Pushnitsa
Medal record

Men's Sambo

World Championships
Gold medal – first place	1974	-90 kg
Gold medal – first place	1979	-90 kg
Silver medal – second place	1981	-90 kg
Gold medal – first place	1983	-90 kg

European Championships
Gold medal – first place	1976	-90 kg
Gold medal – first place	1984	-90 kg

Friendship Games
Silver medal – second place	1984 Ulaanbaatar	-90 kg

USSR Championships
Gold medal – first place	1974	-90 kg
Gold medal – first place	1975	-90 kg
Gold medal – first place	1976	-100 kg
Gold medal – first place	1977	-90 kg
Gold medal – first place	1978	-90 kg
Gold medal – first place	1979	-90 kg
Gold medal – first place	1980	-90 kg
Bronze medal – third place	1981	-90 kg
Silver medal – second place	1982	-90 kg
Gold medal – first place	1983	-90 kg
Gold medal – first place	1984	-90 kg
Silver medal – second place	1986	-90 kg
Silver medal – second place	1987	-90 kg

Alexander Mikhailovich Pushnitsa (Russian: Алекса́ндр Миха́йлович Пушни́ца; 1 November 1949 – 27 January 2023) was the most competitively successful sambist in history of sambo, Merited Master of Sports of the USSR (1980), nine-time champion of the USSR, two-time European champion and three-time world champion. He was a permanent captain of the Soviet Union Sambo team for 15 years. In 1997, in Paris he won the European Championship for sambo veterans. He was a graduate of the Omsk State Institute of Physical Culture (1987). Honorary Citizen of the city of Omsk, Deputy Chairman of Sambo Federation of the Omsk region, and head of the sports school Sambo 2000. An annual sambo tournament has been held in Omsk since 2000 in his honour.

== Biography ==
Alexander's father and mother were rural teachers. Alexander grew up in a village. He liked to fight since childhood. Boys usually fought on the ground, not observing any rules. Most often Alexander struggled with his twin brother Vladimir [subsequently International Master of Sports in Sambo and three-time bronze medalist (1977, 1978, 1982) of the USSR Championships]. There was no television in that village, and the brothers knew nothing about Sambo. Father of Alexander and Vladimir, a veteran of World War II, instilled in them a love of peasant labor and sports. Brothers loved not only to fight, but also cross-country skiing, playing soccer and hockey. Alexander was endowed with agility, endurance, speed, tenacity, determination and patience. His desire to win competitions began to manifest itself in early childhood. When he was fifteen, Alexander began to win in the village self-made championships. Adult men participated in those competitions. In the final fight Alexander usually met with his brother Vladimir.

=== Labor way ===
- 1964–1968 — A Mechanic (Temirtau);
- 1968–1970 — Served in the Soviet Army;
- 1970–1971 — Concrete Worker (Frunze);
- 1971–1973 — Inspector of Investigation Group (Frunze);
- 1973–1993 — Inspector of Combat and Physical Training (Omsk);
- 1993–2023 — Sambo coach, head of the sports club Sambo 2000 (Omsk).

=== Sports path ===
Alexander started training Sambo while serving in the Soviet Army (1968).
In 1971 he became Master of Sports of the USSR.
In 1980 he was awarded the title of Merited Master of Sports of the USSR.
Results of competitions
1973 — Champion of sports society Dynamo (USSR).
1974 — World Champion and Champion of the USSR.
1975 — Champion of the USSR.
1976 — European Champion and Champion of the USSR.
1977 — Champion of the USSR.
1978 — Champion of the USSR.
1979 — World Champion and Champion of the USSR.
1980 — Champion of the USSR.
1981 — Bronze Medalist of the USSR Championship.
1982 — Silver Medalist of the USSR Championship.
1983 — World Champion and Champion of the USSR.
1984 — European Champion and Champion of the USSR, Friendship Games silver medalist.
1986 — Silver Medalist of the USSR Championship.
1987 — Silver Medalist of the USSR Championship.
The style of fighting
Famous Sambo coach Yevgeny Chumakov (the most successful disciple of Anatoly Kharlampiev) said that the style and the results of fights of Alexander Pushnitsa best propaganda of Sambo in the international sports arena.
