= Ion Ivanov =

Romanian wrestler

Personal information
- Nationality: Romanian
- Born: 21 January 1956 (age 70)

Sport
- Sport: Wrestling
Medal record
Representing Romania
Summer Universiade
Bronze medal – third place	1977 Sofia	90 kg

Ion Ivanov (born 21 January 1956) is a Romanian wrestler. He competed in the men's freestyle 90 kg at the 1980 Summer Olympics.
