= Ivan Tsochev =

Bulgarian wrestler

Personal information
- Nationality: Bulgarian
- Born: 9 July 1954 (age 72) Sofia, Bulgaria

Sport
- Sport: Wrestling

Ivan Tsochev (born 9 July 1954) is a Bulgarian wrestler. He competed in the men's freestyle 57 kg at the 1980 Summer Olympics.
