= Aleksander Cichoń =

Polish freestyle wrestler

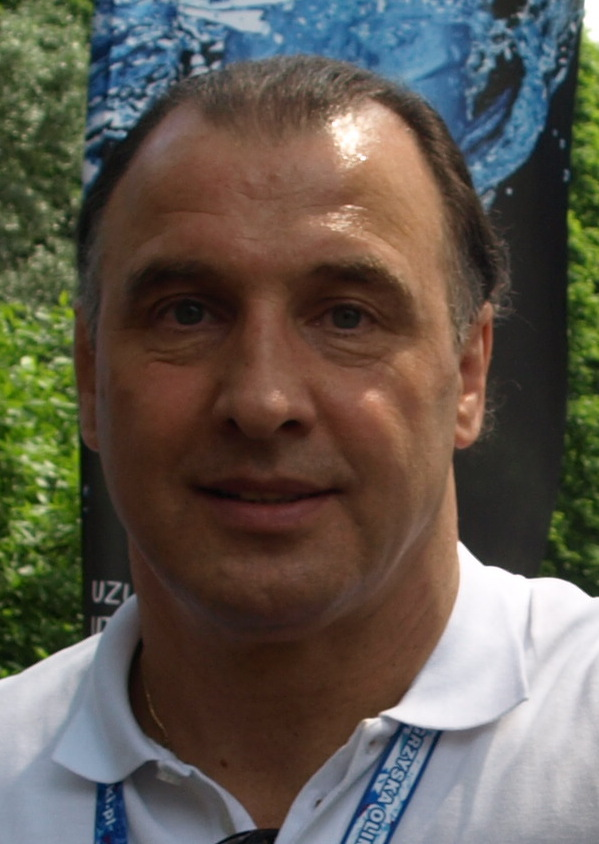
- Cichoń in 2013

Personal information
- Full name: Aleksander Jan Cichoń
- Born: 9 December 1958 (age 67) Rzeszów, Poland
- Height: 180 cm (5 ft 11 in)
- Weight: 84 kg (185 lb)
Medal record
Men's freestyle wrestling
Representing Poland
Olympic Games
Bronze medal – third place	1980 Moscow	90 kg

Aleksander Jan Cichoń (born 9 December 1958 in Rzeszów) is a Polish wrestler who competed in the 1980 Summer Olympics.

He was a bronze medalist in wrestling at the 1980 Summer Olympics in the freestyle 90 kg category (light-heavyweight).
