= Sándor Németh (wrestler) =

Hungarian wrestler

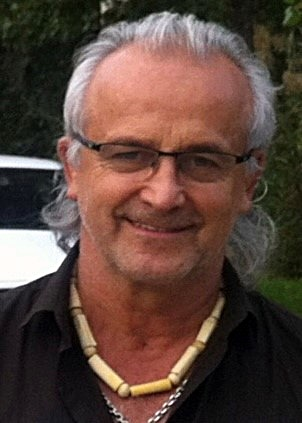

Personal information
- Nationality: Hungarian
- Born: 31 January 1957 (age 69) Kenyeri, Hungary

Sport
- Sport: Wrestling

Sándor Németh (born 31 January 1957) is a Hungarian wrestler. He competed in the men's freestyle 57 kg at the 1980 Summer Olympics.
