= Luis Ocaña (wrestler) =

Cuban wrestler (born 1955)

Personal information
- Full name: Luis Ocaña Zulueta
- Nationality: Cuban
- Born: 3 January 1955 (age 71)

Sport
- Sport: Wrestling
Medal record
Men's freestyle wrestling
Representing Cuba
Pan American Games
Silver medal – second place	1979 San Juan	52 kg

Luis Ocaña Zulueta (born 3 January 1955) is a Cuban wrestler. He competed in the men's freestyle 52 kg at the 1980 Summer Olympics.
