= José Antonio Cecchini =

Spanish judoka

José Antonio Cecchini (born October 8, 1955) is a retired Spanish wrestler who represented his country in sambo, judo and Greco-Roman wrestling. At 1979 and 1981, he won gold medal at World Sambo Championships. He participated at the 1980 Summer Olympics in judo and was eliminated in second round by Slavko Obadov from Yugoslavia.
