= Nguyễn Văn Công (wrestler) =

Vietnamese wrestler

Personal information
- Nationality: Vietnamese
- Born: 10 April 1960 (age 66)

Sport
- Sport: Wrestling

Nguyễn Văn Công (born 10 April 1960) is a Vietnamese wrestler. He competed in the men's freestyle 48 kg at the 1980 Summer Olympics.
