= Stal Rzeszów (multi-sports club) =

ZKS Stal Rzeszów
- Full name: Works Sports Club Stal Rzeszów (Polish: Zakładowy Klub Sportowy Stal Rzeszów)
- Founded: 1944; 82 years ago
- Based in: Rzeszów, Poland
- Colors

ZKS Stal Rzeszów is a multi-sports club, currently known for its association football and motorcycle speedway sections, although with successes in diving and wrestling as well.

== Acrobatic gymnastics ==
The club possesses an acrobatics section.

== Association football ==
Founded in 1944 as one of the first sections of the club. They won the Polish Cup in 1975, and despite limited success overall, remains a popular club in the city.

== Boxing ==
The boxing section of the club boast several national championship medals, and boasts professional boxer Łukasz Różański.

== Cycling ==
The club possesses a cycling section.

== Diving ==
=== History ===
The diving section of the ZKS Stal Rzeszów club, was established in 1985. Then, coach Ryszard Wojtaszewski selected several children from the acrobatics section with whom he began training at the pool. The first successes came in the first year of the section's existence, when Marta Tomkiewicz won the second place in the springboard jumping competition at the 12th National Youth Spartakade. In the following years, the section developed very dynamically, bringing up many great athletes. One of the achievements of the sports section is the education of the Olympian Grzegorz Kozdranski.

=== Achievements ===
- 1992 - Olympic Games in Barcelona - junior athlete Grzegorz Kozdrański takes part in jumping competitions from a 3m springboard and a 10m tower,
- 1993 - Junior European Championships, gold medal for 10m tower jumps for Grzegorz Kozdranski,
- 1994 - Junior European Championships, bronze puck for 7.5m tower jumps for Daniel Kozak,
- 1997 - Junior European Championships, two silver medals of Dariusz Górniak for 7.5m tower jumps and 3m trampolines,
- 1998 - Junior European Championships, 1st place and the title of Junior European Champion for Dariusz Górniak on a 3-meter trampoline,
- 2001 - Junior European Championships, bronze medal won by Grzegorz Szczepek on the 1m springboard,
- 2008 - Junior European Championships, bronze medal won by Andrzej Rzeszutek on a 1-meter springboard,
- 2009 - Junior European Championships, silver medal won by Andrzej Rzeszutek on a 1-meter springboard,
- 2009 - Senior World Championships, 8th place for Andrzej Rzeszutek on a 1-meter trampoline.
- 2011 - Junior European Championships, silver medal for Kacper Lesiak on a 1-meter trampoline.
- 2011 - Senior World Championships, 8th place for Andrzej Rzeszutek on a 1-meter trampoline.

== Ice hockey ==
Ice hockey section of the club existed between 1953 and 1961.

== Motorcycle speedway ==
The motorcycle speedway was a former section of the sports club and is now an independent club.

== Wrestling ==
The wrestling section of Stal Rzeszów was established in 1959, and its creators were coach Jan Małek and activists Waldemar Pasternak and Józef Ziembicki. After three years, in 1962, the team was promoted to the regional league of Kraków and Rzeszów. In 1967 the Stal team was promoted to the 1st league. Promotion was won by athletes who were at the beginning of their careers, winning medals at the Polish Junior Championships. In 1967, Stal won the silver medal at the Central Spartakiad. After a year of performances in the highest league, Stal were relegated, but in 1968 they were promoted to the first league. In 1969 Stal won the Polish team championship for the first time. In total, Stal Rzeszów became an 18-time Polish team wrestling champion (last time in 1990). Moreover, the team won the silver medal several times (1970, 1978, 1984, 1991).

In the early 1990s, Wojciech Małek was the leading coach in the wrestling section of Stal. Other well-known athletes of the section are Jan Falandys.

== Bibliography ==
- Marek Bluj (19 December 1984). "Cztery czterdziestolecia "Stali" Rzeszów 1944–1984". Sygnatura Oryginału: 3 Ii Wia/1984. 35. Wiadomości Fabryczne: 4.
