= Granit (name) =

Granit may refer to the following people:

== Given name ==
- Granit Lekaj (born 1990), Kosovo–born Swiss–Albanian football player
- Granit Rugova (born 1985), Kosovan basketball player
- Granit Taropin (born 1940), Russian wrestling coach
- Granit Xhaka (born 1992), Swiss-Albanian football player

== Surname ==
- Ragnar Granit (1900–1991), Finnish scientist
- Yalçın Granit (1932–2020), Turkish basketball player, coach and sports journalist
