= Zhaksylyk Ushkempirov =

Kazakhstani wrestler (1951–2020)

Jaqsylyq Üşkempırov
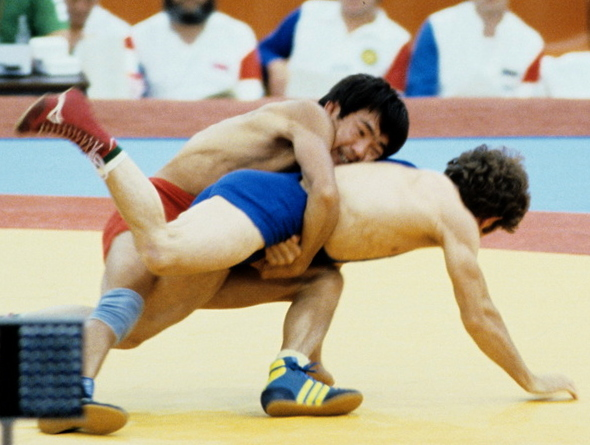
- Ushkempirov (left) at the 1980 Olympics

Personal information
- Born: 6 May 1951 Tegistik, Bayzak District, Kazakh SSR, Soviet Union
- Died: 2 August 2020 (aged 69) Nur-Sultan, Kazakhstan
- Height: 156 cm (5 ft 1 in)
- Weight: 48 kg (106 lb)

Sport
- Sport: Greco-Roman wrestling
Medal record
Men's Greco-Roman wrestling
Representing the Soviet Union
Olympic Games
Gold medal – first place	1980 Moscow	48 kg
World Championships
Gold medal – first place	1981 Oslo	48 kg
European Championships
Silver medal – second place	1980 Prievidza	48 kg

Zhaksylyk Ushkempirov (Kazakh: Jaqsylyq Ämırälıūly Üşkempırov / Жақсылық Әмірәліұлы Үшкемпіров; 6 May 1951 – 2 August 2020) was a light-flyweight Greco-Roman wrestler from Kazakhstan. He won an Olympic gold medal in 1980 and a world title in 1981.

Ushkempirov took up wrestling in 1969 and won the Soviet title in 1975 and 1980. After retiring from competitions he worked as director of a sports school in Almaty in 1984–1993. In 1993 he founded the sports club Zhaksylyk and served as its president. Since 2001, an annual junior wrestling tournament has been held in Almaty in his honor.

== Memory ==
In 2019, a feature film "Zhaksylyk" (Kazakhstan) was shot about the life of Zhaksylyk Ushkempirov. Ushkempirov was played by Elnar Nazarkul and Sanurzhan Suleimenov in his youth and adolescence, and the role of a 60-year-old athlete was played by Doszhan Zhanbotaev.

On December 2, 2020, the Martial Arts Palace in Nur Sultan was renamed in honor of Zhaksylyk Ushkempirov.

On September 8, 2021, a monument was unveiled next to him
