= Ivan Ginov =

Bulgarian wrestler

Personal information
- Nationality: Bulgarian
- Born: 10 February 1956 (age 70) Burgas, Bulgaria

Sport
- Sport: Wrestling

Ivan Ginov (born 10 February 1956) is a Bulgarian wrestler. He competed in the men's freestyle 90 kg at the 1980 Summer Olympics.
