= Wiesław Kończak =

Polish wrestler

Personal information
- Nationality: Polish
- Born: 5 October 1951 (age 74) Wrocław, Poland

Sport
- Sport: Wrestling

Wiesław Kończak (born 5 October 1951) is a Polish wrestler. He competed in the men's freestyle 57 kg at the 1980 Summer Olympics.
