= Rafael Gómez (wrestler) =

Cuban wrestler

Personal information
- Nationality: Cuban
- Born: 14 May 1960 (age 66)

Sport
- Sport: Wrestling

Rafael Gómez (born 14 May 1960) is a Cuban wrestler. He competed in the men's freestyle 90 kg at the 1980 Summer Olympics.
