= Abdel Atif Bergheul =

Algerian handball player

Personal information
- Nationality: Algerian

Sport
- Sport: Handball

Abdel Atif Bergheul is an Algerian handball player. He competed in the men's tournament at the 1980 Summer Olympics.
