= Nguyễn Kim Thiềng =

Vietnamese wrestler

Personal information
- Nationality: Vietnamese
- Born: 30 October 1960 (age 65)

Sport
- Sport: Wrestling

Nguyễn Kim Thiềng (born 30 October 1960) is a Vietnamese former wrestler. He competed in the men's freestyle 52 kg at the 1980 Summer Olympics.

== Post-career ==
In 1988 and 1989, Nguyễn Kim Thiềng was the coach of Vietnamese national wrestling team. As of 2021, he coaches a wrestling club in Thạch Thất district, with about 100 youngsters participated.
