= Koce Efremov =

Yugoslav wrestler (1956–2018)

Personal information
- Nationality: Yugoslav
- Born: 17 March 1956 Kočani
- Died: 7 October 2018 (aged 62)

Sport
- Sport: Wrestling

Koce Efremov (17 March 1956 — 7 October 2018) was a Yugoslav wrestler. He competed in the men's freestyle 52 kg at the 1980 Summer Olympics.
