= Rashid Mokhrani =

Algerian handball player (born 1960)

Personal information
- Nationality: Algerian
- Born: 7 June 1960 (age 64)

Sport
- Sport: Handball

Rashid Mokhrani (born 7 June 1960) is an Algerian handball player. He competed at the 1980 Summer Olympics and the 1984 Summer Olympics.
