= Ferenc Seres =

Hungarian wrestler (born 1945)

Medal record

Representing Hungary

Men's Greco-Roman wrestling

Olympic Games
Bronze medal – third place	1980 Moscow	Flyweight

Ferenc Seres (born 3 November 1945) is a Hungarian wrestler. He was born in Tiszakécske. He won an Olympic bronze medal in Greco-Roman wrestling in 1980. He won a bronze medal at the 1973 World Wrestling Championships.
