= Ali Akacha =

Algerian handball player (born 1954)

Personal information
- Nationality: Algeria
- Born: 23 January 1954 (age 71)
- Height: 1.85 m (6 ft 1 in)
- Weight: 80 kg (180 lb)

Sport
- Sport: Handball

Ali Akacha (born 23 January 1954) is an Algerian handball player. He competed in the 1980 Summer Olympics.
