= Saber Nakdali =

Syrian wrestler (born 1960)

Saber Nakdali (born 1 March 1960) is a Syrian former wrestler who competed in the 1980 Summer Olympics, where he lost both of his matches.
