= Reijo Haaparanta =

Finnish wrestler

Personal information
- Nationality: Finnish
- Born: 25 August 1958 (age 67) Kauhajoki, Finland

Sport
- Sport: Wrestling

Reijo Haaparanta (born 25 August 1958) is a Finnish wrestler. He competed in the men's Greco-Roman 48 kg at the 1980 Summer Olympics.
