= Abdel Atif Bakir =

Algerian handball player (born 1957)

Personal information
- Nationality: Algerian
- Born: 18 May 1957 (age 67)

Sport
- Sport: Handball

Abdel Atif Bakir (born 18 May 1957) is an Algerian handball player. He competed in the men's tournament at the 1980 Summer Olympics.
