= Carlos Hurtado (wrestler) =

Peruvian wrestler

Carlos Hurtado (born 7 October 1951) is a Peruvian former wrestler who competed in the 1972 Summer Olympics and in the 1980 Summer Olympics.
