= Granit Taropin =

Russian wrestler

Granit Taropin was born in the city of Peltun on North Sakhalin Island in Russia on February 23, 1940.

In high school Taropin first became interested in wrestling after reading a booklet about a wrestler from Tula. After he graduated in 1958, he went to Tula in the hopes of finding this wrestler. While there, he became a Master of Sports in wrestling at the age of 20.

Then, in 1961 he entered a sports college in Malakhovka near Moscow. After he graduated in 1963, he went to the Institute of Sports in Smolensk, where he stayed until he graduated in 1967.

After he received his degree from the Institute of Sports, he began his first job as a professional coach in Kaliningrad where he would spend the next 10 years.

While in Kaliningrad, he worked at a children’s sports school with over two hundred wrestlers at a time. It was at this time when he first met his most famous wrestlers, Anatoly and Sergei Beloglazov.

When Taropin finally left Kaliningrad in 1977, he moved to Kiev as the head coach of Club Dynamo as well as one of the national team coaches of the Soviet Union.

Granit Taropin stayed in Kiev until 1986 when he left to become the head wrestling coach in India where he spent the next four years.

Shortly after he left as the head coach of India he moved to Scotland where he became the head coach of the Great Britain national team. A position he held until 1996 when he moved to Boston, MA and became an assistant coach at Harvard University.

Granit Taropin has been recognized as a Merited Coach in the Soviet Union, Russia and the Ukraine, receiving the honor of an ordinances form the USSR 3 times. His wrestlers have won 11 world gold medals and 3 Olympic gold medals. Further, except for 1984 (when the Soviet Union did not send a team) and for 2000, Granit Taropin has participated as a coach in every Olympics in the last 25 years.

He was formerly married to Larisa Taropina and Lyubov Taropina, and has two daughters Anzhella and Anna. Currently lives in Somerville, MA.
