= Grzegorz Kozdrański =

Polish diver (born 1976)

Personal information
- Nationality: Polish
- Born: 7 June 1976 (age 49) Rzeszów, Poland

Sport
- Sport: Diving

Grzegorz Kozdrański (born 7 June 1976) is a Polish diver. He competed in two events at the 1992 Summer Olympics.
