= Amadou Diop =

Senegalese wrestler

Personal information
- Nationality: Senegalese
- Born: 11 February 1953 (age 73)
- Died: 15 June 2026 Senegal

Sport
- Sport: Wrestling

Amadou Diop (born 11 February 1953) is a Senegalese wrestler. He competed at the 1980 Summer Olympics and the 1984 Summer Olympics. He died on 15 June 2026.
