= Mohammad Aynutdin =

Afghan wrestler (born 1955)

Mohammad Aynutdin (born 15 April 1955) is a former Afghanistan wrestler, who competed at the 1980 Summer Olympics in the flyweight event.
