= Sanasar Oganisyan =

Armenian wrestler (born 1960)

Personal information
- Born: 5 February 1960 (age 66) Moscow, Russian SFSR, Soviet Union
- Height: 1.80 m (5 ft 11 in)
- Weight: 90 kg (198 lb)

Sport
- Sport: Wrestling
- Event: Freestyle
- Club: Spartak Moscow
Medal record
Men's freestyle wrestling
Representing Soviet Union
Olympic Games
Gold medal – first place	1980 Moscow	90 kg
World Championships
Gold medal – first place	1981 Skopje	90 kg
European Championships
Gold medal – first place	1986 Piraeus	90 kg
World Cup
Gold medal – first place	1981 Toledo	90 kg
Silver medal – second place	1986 Toledo	100 kg

Sanasar Oganisyan (Armenian: Սանասար Հովհաննիսյան, born 5 February 1960) is a Soviet Armenian former freestyle wrestler and Olympic, World and European Champion. He became an Honoured Master of Sports of the USSR in 1980.

== Early life ==
Oganisyan was born on February 5, 1960, in Moscow, Russian SFSR. He graduated from the Moscow Engineering and Construction Institute. As an espoir he became a European Champion in 1978 and as a junior a World Champion in 1979. Oganisyan played for the Spartak Moscow wrestling club.

== Career ==
At the age of 20, Oganisyan was selected by the Soviet Olympic team to compete at the 1980 Summer Olympics. Oganisyan won an Olympic gold medal. He became the first Armenian freestyle wrestler and the second Armenian wrestler to become an Olympic Champion.

Oganisyan won a gold medal at the 1981 World Wrestling Championships and 1981 Wrestling World Cup the following year. However, he also received a serious back injury in 1982 and had to take some time off. It took almost two years for Oganisyan is recover, after which he qualified for the 1984 Soviet Olympic team but missed the Olympics due to the Soviet boycott. Instead he competed in wrestling at the Friendship Games and won gold as light-heavyweight, and later won the World Cup that year as well.

He won a gold medal at the 1986 European Wrestling Championships, but then re-injured his back and again missed several seasons. After recovering, Oganisyan made another comeback attempt, now as a heavyweight, but with less success, not qualifying for the 1988 Soviet Olympic team, although he did win silver at the 1989 World Cup. Oganisyan won his second USSR Championship in 1989 and retired after the fall of the Soviet Union.

== Sports results ==
- The 1977 USSR Championship (Junior), 87 kg — Gold;
- The 1978 USSR Championship (Espoir), 90 kg — Gold;
- The 1978 European Championship (Espoir), 90 kg — Gold;
- The 1979 USSR Championship (Espoir), 90 kg — Gold;
- The 1979 World Championship (Juniors), 90 kg — Gold;
- The 1980 Tbilisi International Tournament, 90 kg — Gold;
- The 1980 European Championship, 90 kg — Gold;
- The 1980 USSR Championship, 90 kg — Silver;
- The 1980 Olympic Games, 90 kg — Gold;
- The 1981 World Championship, 90 kg — Gold;
- The 1981 World Cup, 90 kg — Gold;
- The 1981 Tbilisi International Tournament, 90 kg — Gold;
- The 1981 USSR Championship, 90 kg — Gold;
- The 1982 USSR Championship, 90 kg — Silver;
- The 1983 World Cup, 90 kg — Gold;
- The Friendship-84, 90 kg — Gold;
- The 1984 World Cup, 90 kg — Gold;
- The 1984 USSR Championship, 90 kg — Silver;
- The 1986 European Championship, 90 kg — Gold;
- The 1986 USSR Championship, 90 kg — Bronze;
- The 1986 USSR Cup, 90 kg — Gold;
- The 1987 Tbilisi International Tournament, 90 kg — Gold;
- The 1987 International Tournament in Turkey, 90 kg — Gold;
- The 1988 USSR Championship, 90 kg — Silver;
- The 1989 Tbilisi International Tournament, 100 kg — Gold;
- The 1989 USSR Championship, 100 kg — Gold.

== Personal life ==
Sanasar's younger brother is Gor Chahal, a famous artist.
