= Kamel Hebri =

Algerian handball player

Personal information
- Nationality: Algerian

Sport
- Sport: Handball

Kamel Hebri is an Algerian former handball player. He competed in the men's tournament at the 1980 Summer Olympics.
