= Aurel Neagu =

Romanian wrestler

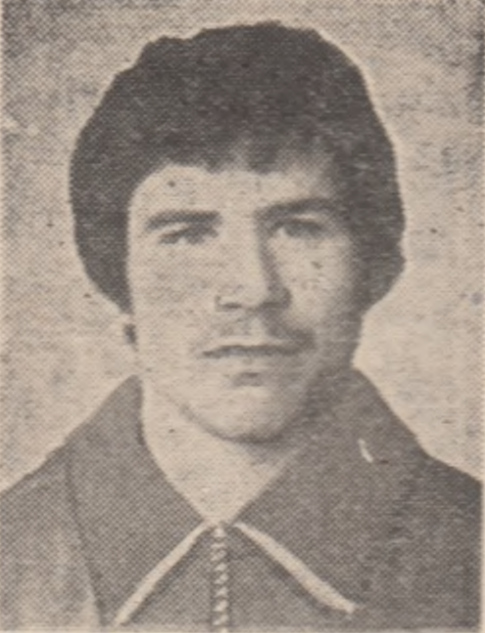
- Aurel Neagu in 1979

Personal information
- Nationality: Romanian
- Born: 8 July 1954 (age 72) Văcăreni, Romania

Sport
- Sport: Wrestling
Medal record
Representing Romania
Summer Universiade
Bronze medal – third place	1981 Bucharest	57 kg

Aurel Neagu (born 8 July 1954) is a Romanian wrestler. He competed in the men's freestyle 57 kg at the 1980 Summer Olympics.
