= Mohammed Qassim Jabbar =

Iraqi wrestler

Personal information
- Nationality: Iraqi
- Born: 1957 (age 68–69)

Sport
- Sport: Wrestling

Mohammed Qassim Jabbar (Arabic: محمد قاسم جبار, born 1957) is an Iraqi wrestler. He competed in the men's freestyle 48 kg at the 1980 Summer Olympics.
