= Ahmed Farfar =

Algerian handball player (born 1953)

Personal information
- Nationality: Algerian
- Born: 7 January 1953 (age 73) Skikda, Algeria
- Height: 188 cm (74 in)

Sport
- Sport: Handball
- Position: Goalkeeper

Senior clubs
- Years: Team
- –: DNC Alger
National team
- Years: Team
- 1970–1980: Algeria

Teams managed
- –: ERC Alger
- –: SR Annaba
- –: El Wakra

Ahmeds Farfar (born 7 January 1953) is an Algerian handball player. He competed in the men's tournament at the 1980 Summer Olympics.
