= Uwe Neupert =

East German wrestler (born 1957)

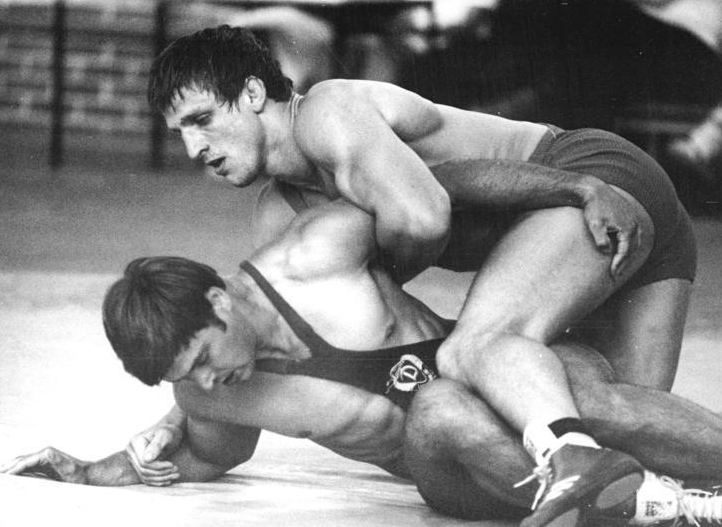
- Neupert (top) in 1982

Personal information
- Born: 5 August 1957 (age 69) Greiz, Bezirk Gera, East Germany
- Height: 188 cm (6 ft 2 in)

Sport
- Sport: Freestyle wrestling
- Club: Tus Jena
Medal record
Men's freestyle wrestling
Representing East Germany
Olympic Games
Silver medal – second place	1980 Moscow	90 kg
World Championships
Gold medal – first place	1978 Mexico City	90 kg
Gold medal – first place	1982 Edmonton	90 kg
Silver medal – second place	1977 Lausanne	90 kg
Silver medal – second place	1979 San Diego	90 kg
Bronze medal – third place	1981 Skopje	90 kg
Bronze medal – third place	1983 Kiev	90 kg
Bronze medal – third place	1985 Budapest	100 kg
Bronze medal – third place	1989 Martigny	100 kg
European Championships
Gold medal – first place	1978 Sofia	90 kg
Gold medal – first place	1979 Bucharest	90 kg
Gold medal – first place	1981 Lodz	90 kg
Silver medal – second place	1980 Prievidza	90 kg
Silver medal – second place	1982 Varna	100 kg
Silver medal – second place	1984 Jönköping	100 kg
Silver medal – second place	1985 Leipzig	100 kg
Bronze medal – third place	1983 Budapest	90 kg
Bronze medal – third place	1986 Piraeus	100 kg
Bronze medal – third place	1988 Manchester	100 kg

Uwe Neupert (born 5 August 1957) is an East German retired heavyweight freestyle wrestler. He competed at the 1980 and 1988 Olympics and placed second and fourth, respectively. Between 1978 and 1989 he collected 18 medals at the world and European championships, including five gold medals. He won both the European and world title in 1978.
