= Gheorghe Rașovan =

Romanian wrestler

Personal information
- Nationality: Romanian
- Born: 6 March 1955 (age 71) Caraș-Severin, Romania

Sport
- Sport: Wrestling

Gheorghe Rașovan (born 6 March 1955) is a Romanian wrestler. He competed in the men's freestyle 48 kg at the 1980 Summer Olympics.
