= Mohamed Hachaichi =

Algerian wrestler

Personal information
- Nationality: Algerian
- Born: 26 February 1951
- Died: 6 June 2013 (aged 62)

Sport
- Sport: Wrestling

Mohamed Hachaichi (26 February 1951 – 6 June 2013) was an Algerian wrestler. He competed in the men's freestyle 52 kg at the 1980 Summer Olympics.
