= Mohammad Halilula =

Afghan wrestler (born 1952)

Mohammad Halilula (born 14 February 1952) is a former Afghanistan wrestler, who competed at the 1980 Summer Olympics in the bantamweight event.
