= Abdel Madjid Slimani =

Algerian handball player (born 1959)

Personal information
- Nationality: Algerian
- Born: 5 April 1959 (age 65)

Sport
- Sport: Handball

Abdel Madjid Slimani (born 5 April 1959) is an Algerian handball player. He competed in the men's tournament at the 1980 Summer Olympics.
