= Omar Yousfi =

Algerian weightlifter (born 1956)

Personal information
- Nationality: Algerian
- Born: 18 May 1956 (age 69)

Sport
- Sport: Weightlifting

Omar Yousfi (born 18 May 1956) is an Algerian weightlifter. He competed at the 1980 Summer Olympics and the 1988 Summer Olympics.
