= Li Ho-pyong =

North Korean wrestler (born 1951)

- Hangul: 리호평
- RR: Ri Hopyeong
- MR: Ri Hop'yŏng

Olympic medal record

Men's freestyle wrestling

Representing North Korea

Olympic Games
Silver medal – second place	1980 Moscow	57 kg

Li Ho-Pyong (Korean: 리호평, born 16 October 1951) is a Korean former wrestler who competed in the 1980 Summer Olympics.
