= Władysław Stecyk =

Polish wrestler (born 1951)

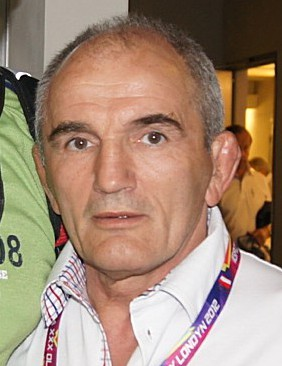

Medal record

Men's freestyle wrestling

Representing Poland

Olympic Games
Silver medal – second place	1980 Moscow	Flyweight

Władysław Stecyk (born 14 July 1951 in Radowo Małe) is a Polish wrestler who competed in the 1976 Summer Olympics, 1980 Summer Olympics and 1988 Summer Olympics.

Silver medalist at the 1980 Summer Olympics in wrestling in 52 kg category (flyweight).
