= Sergei Beloglazov =

Russian freestyle wrestler

Medal record

Men's freestyle wrestling

Representing Soviet Union

Olympic Games
| Gold medal – first place | 1980 Moscow | 57 kg |
| Gold medal – first place | 1988 Seoul | 57 kg |

World Championships
| Gold medal – first place | 1981 Skopje | 57 kg |
| Gold medal – first place | 1982 Edmonton | 62 kg |
| Gold medal – first place | 1983 Kyiv | 57 kg |
| Gold medal – first place | 1985 Budapest | 57 kg |
| Gold medal – first place | 1986 Budapest | 57 kg |
| Gold medal – first place | 1987 Clermont-Ferrand | 57 kg |
| Silver medal – second place | 1979 San Diego | 57 kg |

Sergei Alekseyevich Beloglazov (Russian: Серге́й Алексеевич Белоглазов, born 16 September 1956 in Kaliningrad) is a Soviet and Russian former Olympic wrestler and World Champion. He trained at the Armed Forces sports society in Kaliningrad in 1976–77 and at Dynamo in Kiev since 1979. He was a two-time Olympic Champion in 1980 and 1988, a six-time World Champion and a World Silver medalist. He has a twin brother Anatoly Beloglazov, who was an Olympic Champion in 1980 and a three-time World Champion. He wrestled for coach Granit Taropin for the former Soviet Union. He is regarded by many to be one of the greatest freestyle wrestlers of all time.

His son, Sergei S. Beloglazov, died in a car accident at the age of 26 in Sonoma, CA.

As of April 2009, Sergei is the National Head Coach of the Wrestling Federation of Singapore.

On August 31, 2018, Beloglazov was named the Cliff Keen Wrestling Club head coach in Ann Arbor, Michigan.[3]

== Coaching career ==
Following his retirement from competitive wrestling, Sergei Beloglazov embarked on a distinct international coaching career. In 1990, he became the first Soviet Union wrestler to coach at an American university, Lehigh University. He served as the head coach of the US national team from 2003 to 2006.

Beloglazov's coaching career includes leading national teams across multiple countries. Sergei coached the Japanese freestyle team from 1994 to 1998 before returning to Russia to coach their national team. After coaching the Russian women's national team, he then departed to Kazakhstan where he coached from 2013 to 2016.

In 2009, Beloglazov was appointed as the inaugural national head coach of the Wrestling Federation of Singapore, contributing to the country's first wrestling medal at the Southeast Asian Games that year.

Since August 2018, he has been serving as the head coach at the Cliff Keen Wrestling Club in Ann Arbor, Michigan, where he continues to mentor elite collegiate and freestyle wrestlers.

== See also ==
- Wrestling at the 1980 Summer Olympics
