= Jorge Frias =

Mexican wrestler (born 1956)

Personal information
- Nationality: Mexican
- Born: 15 March 1956 (age 69)

Sport
- Sport: Wrestling

Jorge Frias (born 15 March 1956) is a Mexican wrestler. He competed at the 1976 Summer Olympics and the 1980 Summer Olympics.
