= Dugarsürengiin Oyuunbold =

Mongolian freestyle wrestler

Personal information
- Born: October 5, 1958 Sükhbaatar Province, Mongolia
- Died: 2002 (aged 43–44)

Sport
- Sport: Freestyle wrestling
Medal record
Representing Mongolia
Olympic Games
Bronze medal – third place	1980 Moscow	57 kg
World Championships
Bronze medal – third place	1978 Mexico	57 kg
Summer Universiade
Bronze medal – third place	1981 Bucharest	62 kg

Dugarsurengiin Oyunbold (Mongolian: Дугарсүрэнгийн Оюунболд; October 5, 1958 – 2002) was a Mongolian wrestler. At the 1980 Summer Olympics he won the bronze medal in the men's Freestyle Bantamweight category.
