= Sergey Kornilaev =

Russian wrestler (born 1955)

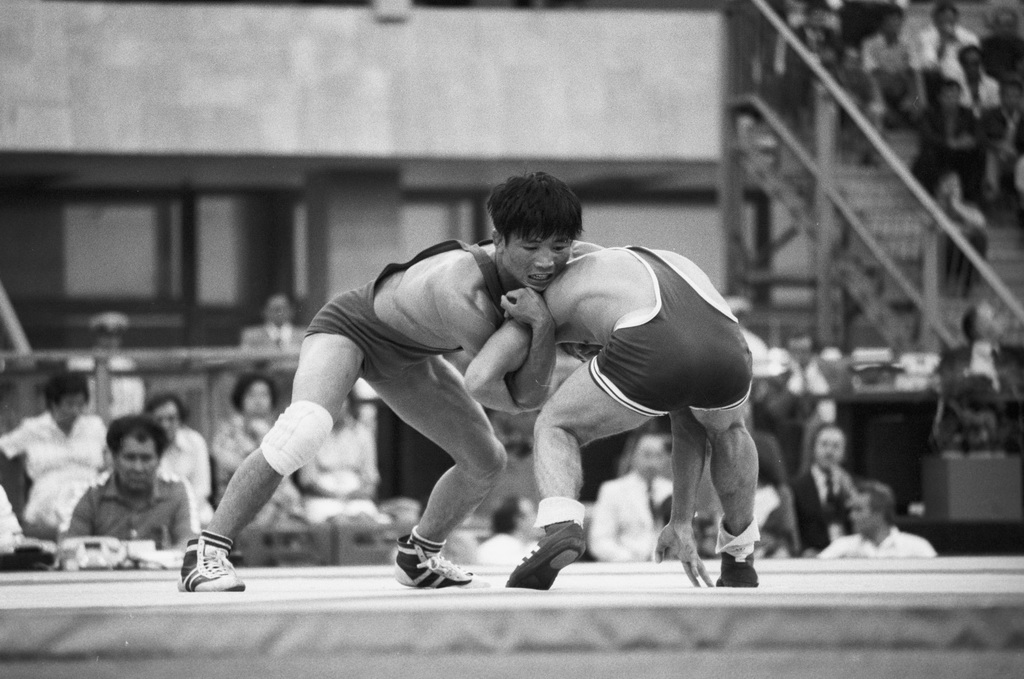
- Jang Se-Hong (left) vs. Sergey Kornilaev

Medal record

Men's freestyle wrestling

Representing the Soviet Union

Olympic Games
Bronze medal – third place	1980 Moscow	Light-flyweight

World Wrestling Championships
Gold medal – first place	1978 Mexico City	Light-flyweight
Gold medal – first place	1979 San Diego	Light-flyweight
Gold medal – first place	1981 Skopje	Light-flyweight
Gold medal – first place	1982 Edmonton	Light-flyweight

European Wrestling Championships
Silver medal – second place	1977 Bursa	Light-flyweight
Gold medal – first place	1985 Leipzig	Light-flyweight

Sergey Grigoryevich Kornilaev (born 20 February 1955) is a Russian former wrestler who competed in the 1980 Summer Olympics.
