= Jang Dok-ryong =

North Korean wrestler (born 1953)

- Hangul: 장덕룡
- RR: Jang Deokryong
- MR: Chang Tŏngnyong

Jang Dok-ryong (born 7 August 1953) is a North Korean former wrestler who competed in the 1972 Summer Olympics and in the 1980 Summer Olympics.
