= Constantin Alexandru =

Romanian Greco-Roman wrestler

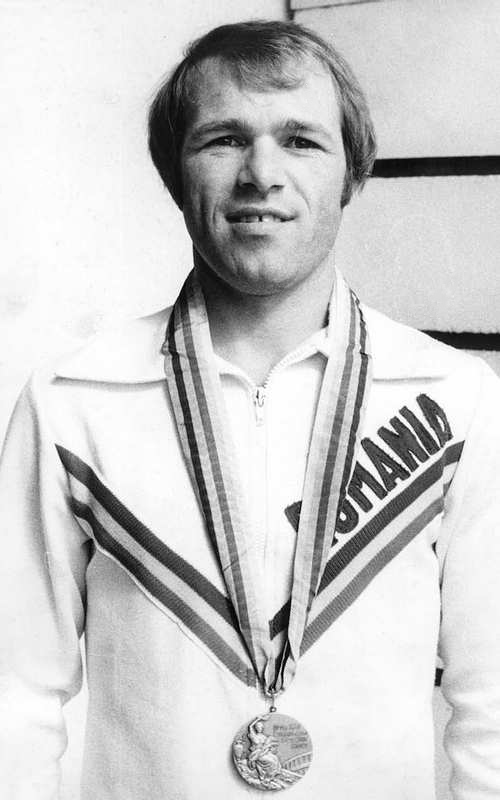
- Alexandru at the 1980 Olympics

Personal information
- Born: 15 December 1953 Constanţa, Romania
- Died: 10 August 2014 (aged 60)
- Height: 157 cm (5 ft 2 in)

Sport
- Sport: Greco-Roman wrestling
- Club: Farul Constanţa; CSA Steaua București
- Coached by: Constantin Ofiterescu
Medal record
Representing Romania
Olympic Games
Silver medal – second place	1980 Moscow	-48 kg
World Championships
Silver medal – second place	1974 Katowice	-48 kg
Gold medal – first place	1978 Mexico City	-48 kg
Gold medal – first place	1979 San Diego	-48 kg
European Championships
Gold medal – first place	1974 Madrid	-48 kg
Gold medal – first place	1975 Ludwigshafen	-48 kg
Silver medal – second place	1976 Leningrad	-48 kg
Gold medal – first place	1977 Bursa	-48 kg
Gold medal – first place	1978 Sofia	-48 kg
Gold medal – first place	1979 Bucharest	-48 kg
Summer Universiade
Gold medal – first place	1977 Sofia	-48kg
Silver medal – second place	1981 Bucharest	-48kg

Constantin Alexandru (15 December 1953 – 10 August 2014) was a light-flyweight Greco-Roman wrestler from Romania who won a silver medal at the 1980 Olympics. He was the world champion in 1978 and 1979 and European champion in 1974–1975 and 1977–1979.

Alexandru took up wrestling at Farul Constanţa, but then moved to CSA Steaua București, where he later worked as a coach. He also trained the national team and served as an international referee.
