= Mahabir Singh =

Indian wrestler

Personal information
- Nationality: Indian
- Born: 1 September 1964 (age 60)

Sport
- Sport: Wrestling

Mahabir Singh (born 1 September 1964) is an Indian wrestler. He competed at the 1980 Summer Olympics and the 1984 Summer Olympics.
