= Nermedin Selimov =

Bulgarian wrestler

Medal record

Men's freestyle wrestling

Representing Bulgaria

Olympic Games
Bronze medal – third place	1980 Moscow	flyweight

Nermedin Selimov (Bulgarian: Нермедин Селимов; born 3 January 1954) is a Bulgarian former wrestler who competed at the 1976 Summer Olympics and the 1980 Summer Olympics.
