= Tsendiin Damdin =

Mongolian judoka (1957–2018)

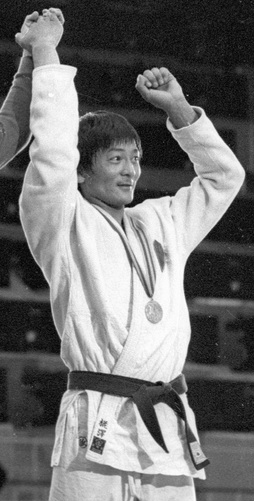

Personal information
- Born: 31 March 1957 Bayan-Adarga sum, Khentii Province, Mongolian People’s Republic
- Died: 22 February 2018 (aged 60)
- Occupation: Judoka

Sport
- Country: Mongolia
- Sport: Judo
- Weight class: ‍–‍65 kg

Achievements and titles
- Olympic Games: (silver) (1980)
- World Champ.: R16 (1983)
Medal record
Men's judo
Representing Mongolia
Olympic Games
Silver medal – second place	1980 Moscow	‍–‍65 kg
Men's sambo
World Championships
Gold medal – first place	1979 Madrid	‍–‍68 kg

Profile at external databases
- IJF: 54220
- JudoInside.com: 5558
- Updated on 19 June 2023

Tsendiin Damdin (Mongolian: Цэндийн Дамдин; 31 March 1957 – 22 February 2018) was a Mongolian wrestler who represented his country in sambo and judo. At the 1980 Summer Olympics he won the silver medal in the men's Half Lightweight (‍–‍65 kg) category.

At the 1980 Olympics in an aggressive and very competitive final match against the reigning World champion Nikolay Solodukhin of Soviet Union, Tsendiin Damdin scored one yuko, Solodukhin also by that time scored one yuko, then at the 7th minute with the score tied Damdin received a shido (penalty), which automatically brought to Soviet wrestler a score koka and the victory according to the old rules of judo.

In 1979 he took a winner title at the World Sambo Championships in lightweight category. At the 1978 International Judo Tournament in Ulaanbaatar, Mongolia, he won the reigning Olympic champion Héctor Rodríguez of Cuba by yuko.
