= Mohammad Aktar =

Afghan wrestler (born 1962)

Mohammad Aktar (born 2 August 1962) is an Afghan former wrestler, who competed at the 1980 Summer Olympics in the light-flyweight event.
