= Gombyn Khishigbaatar =

Mongolian wrestler

Personal information
- Nationality: Mongolian
- Born: 24 August 1953 (age 73)

Sport
- Sport: Wrestling
Medal record
Representing Mongolia
Men's Freestyle wrestling
World Cup
Gold medal – first place	1975 Toledo	48 kg

Gombyn Khishigbaatar (born 24 August 1953) is a Mongolian wrestler. He competed at the 1976 Summer Olympics and the 1980 Summer Olympics.

At the 1973 ″Olympic Hopes″ tournament, Khishigbaatar won the gold medal in the men's freestyle 48 kg, beating future Olympic Champion Anatoly Beloglazov in the final.

At the 1975 World Cup, Khishigbaatar won the gold medal in the men's freestyle 48 kg, he defeated 1974 European and multiple USSR National Champion Vitali Tokchinakov of Soviet Union, 1975 Pan-American Games silver medalist and multiple AAU U.S. National Champion David Range of USA.
