= Claudio Pollio =

Italian wrestler (born 1958)

Medal record

Men's freestyle wrestling

Representing Italy

Olympic Games
| Gold medal – first place | 1980 Moscow | 48 kg |

Claudio Pollio (born 27 May 1958 in Naples) is an Italian wrestler and Olympic champion in men's freestyle wrestling.

== Olympics ==
Pollio competed at the 1980 Summer Olympics in Moscow where he received a gold medal in freestyle wrestling in the 48 kg weight class.
