= Jang Se-hong =

North Korean freestyle wrestler

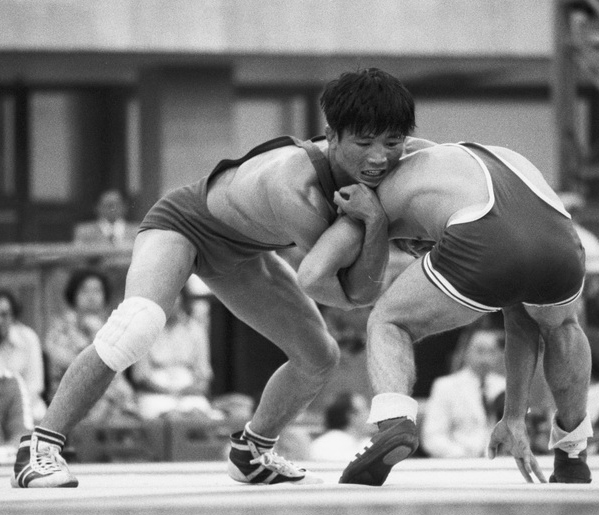
- Jang Se-hong (left) at the 1980 Olympics

Personal information
- Born: 23 October 1953 (age 72)
- Height: 155 cm (5 ft 1 in)

Sport
- Sport: Freestyle wrestling
Medal record
Representing North Korea
Olympic Games
Silver medal – second place	1980 Moscow	-48 kg
Asian Games
Silver medal – second place	1978 Bangkok	-48 kg

Jang Se-hong (Korean: 장세홍, born 23 October 1953) is a retired light-flyweight freestyle wrestler from North Korea. He won silver medals at the 1978 Asian Games and 1980 Olympics.
