= Romania at the 1980 Summer Olympics =

- IOC code: ROU (ROM used at these Games)
- NOC: Romanian Olympic Committee

in Moscow
- Competitors: 228 (154 men and 74 women) in 20 sports
- Flag bearer: Vasile Andrei (Wrestling)
- Medals Ranked 7th: Gold 6 Silver 6 Bronze 13 Total 25

Summer Olympics appearances (overview)
- 1900; 1904–1920; 1924; 1928; 1932; 1936; 1948; 1952; 1956; 1960; 1964; 1968; 1972; 1976; 1980; 1984; 1988; 1992; 1996; 2000; 2004; 2008; 2012; 2016; 2020; 2024; 2028

Romania competed at the 1980 Summer Olympics in Moscow, USSR. 228 competitors, 154 men and 74 women, took part in 135 events in 20 sports.

== Medalists ==
Medal	Name	Sport	Event	Date
Gold	Toma Simionov and Ivan Patzaichin	Canoeing	C2 1000m	
Gold	Nadia Comăneci	Gymnastics	Balance Beam	
Gold	Nadia Comăneci	Gymnastics	Floor Exercises	
Gold	Sanda Toma	Rowing	Single sculls	
Gold	Corneliu Ion	Shooting	Rapid-Fire Pistol	
Gold	Ștefan Rusu	Wrestling	Greco-Roman Lightweight	
Silver	Vasile Dîba, Nicușor Eșanu, Ion Geanta, and Mihai Zafiu	Canoeing	K4 1000m	
Silver	Petre Capusta and Ivan Patzaichin	Canoeing	C2 500m	
Silver	Nadia Comăneci	Gymnastics	All-Around Individual	
Silver	Emilia Eberle	Gymnastics	Asymmetrical Bars	
Silver	Nadia Comăneci, Rodica Dunca, Emilia Eberle, Cristina Elena Grigoraș, Melita Ruhn, and Dumitriţa Turner	Gymnastics	Team Combined Exercises	
Silver	Constantin Alexandru	Wrestling	Greco-Roman Light Flyweight	
Bronze	Dumitru Cipere	Boxing	Bantamweight	
Bronze	Valentin Silaghi	Boxing	Middleweight	
Bronze	Vasile Dîba	Canoeing	K1 500m	
Bronze	Ion Bîrlădeanu	Canoeing	K1 1000m	
Bronze	Anghelache Donescu, Petre Rosca and Durnitru Velicu	Equestrian	Dressage Team	
Bronze	Melita Ruhn	Gymnastics	Side Horse Vault	
Bronze	Melita Ruhn	Gymnastics	Uneven Bars	
Bronze	Ştefan Birtalan, Iosif Boros, Adrian Cosma, Cezar Draganita, Marian Dumitru, Cornel Durau, Alexandru Fölker, Claudiu Eugen Ionescu, Nicolae Munteanu, Vasile Stinga, Lucian Vasilache, Neculai Vasilca, Radu Voina, and Maricel Voinea	Handball	Team Competition	
Bronze	Olga Homeghi and Valeria Răcilă	Rowing	Double Sculls	
Bronze	Angelica Aposteanu, Elena Bondar, Florica Bucur, Maria Constantinescu, Elena Dobrițoiu, Rodica Frintu, Ana Iliuță, and Marlena Zagoni-Predescu	Rowing	Eights	
Bronze	Marius Cata-Chitiga, Valter-Corneliu Chifu, Laurentiu Dumanoiu, Günther Enescu, Dan Girleanu, Sorin Macavei, Corneliu Oros, Neculae Vasile Pop, Constantin Sterea, and Nicu Stoian	Volleyball	Team Competition	
Bronze	Petre Dicu	Wrestling	Greco-Roman Light Heavyweight	
Bronze	Vasile Andrei	Wrestling	Greco-Roman Heavyweight	

Medals by sport
Sport	1st place, gold medalist(s)	2nd place, silver medalist(s)	3rd place, bronze medalist(s)	Total
Boxing	0	0	2	2
Canoeing	1	2	2	5
Equestrian	0	0	1	1
Gymnastics	2	3	2	7
Handball	0	0	1	1
Rowing	1	0	2	3
Shooting	1	0	0	1
Volleyball	0	0	1	1
Wrestling	1	1	2	4
Total	6	6	13	25

Medals by gender
Gender	1st place, gold medalist(s)	2nd place, silver medalist(s)	3rd place, bronze medalist(s)	Total
Male				
Female				
Total	6	6	13	25

== Archery ==
In its first appearance at the Olympic archery competition, Romania was represented by two men and two women. The best result for the nation was earned by Aurora Chin, at 13th place.

Women's Individual Competition:

- Aurora Chin – 2319 pts (→ 13th place)
- Terezia Preda – 2195 pts (→ 24th place)

Men's Individual Competition:

- Andrei Berki – 2389 pts (→ 15th place)
- Mihai Birzu – 2280 pts (→ 25th place)

== Athletics ==
Men's 10,000 metres

- Ilie Floroiu

- Heat — 29:03.1
- Final — 28:16.3 (→ 10th place)

Men's 400 m Hurdles

- Horia Toboc

- Heat — 50.89
- Semifinals — 50.58
- Final — 49.84 (→ 6th place)

Men's 3,000 m Steeplechase

- Vasile Bichea

- Heat — 8:35.4
- Semifinals — 8:24.3
- Final — 8:23.9 (→ 9th place)

- Paul Copu

- Heat — 8:45.6
- Semifinals — 8:45.0 (→ did not advance)

- Nicolae Voicu

- Heat — 8:49.0 (→ did not advance)

Men's High Jump

- Adrian Proteasa

- Qualification — 2.21 m
- Final — 2.21 m (→ 7th place)

- Sorin Matei

- Qualification — 2.21 m
- Final — 2.18 m (→ 13th place)

Men's Discus Throw

- Iosif Nagy

- Qualification — 59.34 m (→ did not advance, 14th place)

Women's 800 metres

- Doina Melinte

- Heat — 2:01.9
- Semifinals — 2:00.8 (→ did not advance)

- Fiţa Lovin

- Heat — 2:00.2
- Semifinals — 1:59.2 (→ did not advance)

Women's 1,500 metres

- Maricica Puică

- Heat — 4:01.7
- Final — 4:01.3 (→ 7th place)

- Ileana Silai

- Heat — 4:04.7
- Final — 4:03.0 (→ 8th place)

- Natalia Mărășescu

- Heat — 4:05.9
- Final — 4:04.8 (→ 9th place)

Women's High Jump

- Cornelia Popa

- Qualification — 1.88 m
- Final — 1.88 m (→ 8th place)

Women's Discus Throw

- Florenţa Ţacu

- Qualification — 60.40 m
- Final — 64.38 m (→ 6th place)

Women's Javelin Throw

- Éva Ráduly-Zörgő

- Qualification — 63.84 m
- Final — 64.08 m (→ 7th place)

== Boxing ==
Men's Light Flyweight (48 kg)

- Dumitru Şchiopu

- First Round — Defeated Adel Hammoude (Syria) after knock-out in second round
- Second Round — Defeated Antti Juntumaa (Finland) on points (4-1)
- Quarter Finals — Lost to Li Byong-Uk (North Korea) on points (4-1)

Men's Flyweight (51 kg)

- Daniel Radu

- First Round — Bye
- Second Round — Defeated Keith Wallace (Great Britain) on points (4-1)
- Quarter Finals — Lost to János Váradi (Hungary) on points (1-4)

Men's Bantamweight (54 kg)

- Dumitru Cipere → Bronze Medal

- First Round — Defeated Mario Behrendt (East Germany) on points (5-0)
- Second Round — Defeated Lucky Mutale (Zambia) on points (5-0)
- Third Round — Defeated Ryszard Czerwinski (Poland) on points (5-0)
- Quarter Finals — Defeated Samson Khachatrian (Soviet Union) on points (4-1)
- Semi Finals — Lost to Bernardo Piñango (Venezuela) on points (2-3)

Men's Featherweight (57 kg)

- Titi Cercel

- First Round — Bye
- Second Round — Defeated Róbert Gönczi (Hungary) on points (5-0)
- Third Round — Lost to Adolfo Horta (Cuba) on points (0-5)

Men's Lightweight (60 kg)

- Florian Livadaru

- First Round — Defeated Tadesse Haile (Ethiopia) after disqualification in third round
- Second Round — Defeated Sean Doyle (Ireland) after referee stopped contest in first round
- Quarter Finals — Lost to Kazimierz Adach (Poland) after referee stopped contest in third round

Men's Light-Welterweight (63,5 kg)

- Simion Cuçov

- First Round — Lost to Serik Konakbaev (Soviet Union) on points (0-5)

Men's Heavyweight (+ 81 kg)

- Teodor Pîrjol

- First Round — Lost to Francesco Damiani (Italy) on points (1-4)

== Cycling ==
Three cyclists represented Romania in 1980.

Individual road race

- Mircea Romaşcanu
- Teodor Vasile
- Stan Nicolae

== Diving ==
Men's Springboard

- Alexandru Adrian Bagiu

- Preliminary round — 427.35 points (→ 23rd place, did not advance)

== Fencing ==
18 fencers, 13 men and 5 women, represented Romania in 1980.

Men's foil

- Petru Kuki
- Mihai Ţiu
- Tudor Petruş

Men's team foil

- Petru Kuki, Mihai Ţiu, Sorin Roca, Tudor Petruş

Men's épée

- Ioan Popa
- Anton Pongratz
- Octavian Zidaru

Men's team épée

- Ioan Popa, Octavian Zidaru, Anton Pongratz, Costică Bărăgan

Men's sabre

- Cornel Marin
- Ioan Pop
- Marin Mustaţă

Men's team sabre

- Ioan Pop, Marin Mustaţă, Cornel Marin, Ion Pantelimonescu, Alexandru Nilca

Women's foil

- Ecaterina Stahl-Iencic
- Marcela Moldovan-Zsak
- Suzana Ardeleanu

Women's team foil

- Ecaterina Stahl-Iencic, Marcela Moldovan-Zsak, Viorica Ţurcanu, Suzana Ardeleanu, Aurora Dan

== Handball ==
Men's team competition

- Preliminary round (Group B)

- Defeated Kuwait (32-12)
- Defeated Algeria (26-18)
- Lost to Yugoslavia (21-23)
- Defeated Soviet Union (22-19)
- Defeated Switzerland (18-16)

- Classification Match

- Bronze medal match: Defeated Hungary (20-18) → Bronze Medal

- Team Roster

- Nicolae Munteanu
- Marian Dumitru
- Iosif Boros
- Maricel Voinea
- Vasile Stîngă
- Radu Voina
- Cezar Draganita
- Cornel Durau
- Ştefan Birtalan
- Alexandru Fölker
- Neculai Vasilca
- Lucian Vasilache
- Adrian Cosma
- Claudiu Eugen Ionescu

== Modern pentathlon ==
Three male pentathletes represented Romania in 1980.

Men's Individual Competition:

- Dumitru Spîrlea — 5058 pts, 22nd place
- Gyula Galovici — 4,935 pts, 27th place
- Cezar Răducanu — 4,397 pts, 41st place

Men's Team Competition:

- Spîrlea, Câllovits, and Râducanu — 14,390 pts, 11th place

== Sailing ==
Open

Athlete	Event	Race							Net points	Final rank
Athlete	Event	1	2	3	4	5	6	7	Net points	Final rank
Mihai Butucaru	Finn	10	~~19~~	18	10	13	19	8	114.0	15
Mircea Carp; Adrian Arendt	Flying Dutchman	12	12	13	11	13	~~14~~	13	110.0	13
Andrei Chjliman; Catalin Luchian	Tornado	10	~~11~~	11	10	11	9	11	98.0	11

== Shooting ==
Open

Athlete	Event	Final	
Athlete	Event	Score	Rank
Mircea Ilca	50 metre rifle prone	596	11
Corneliu Ion	25 m rapid fire pistol	596+148	Gold medal
Daniel Iuga	50 m pistol	555	17
Marin Stan	25 m rapid fire pistol	595	7
Ioan Toman	Skeet	192	22

== Swimming ==
Women's 100 m Breaststroke

- Brigitte Prass

- Heats — 1:15.10 (→ did not advance)

Women's 400m Individual Medley

- Irinel Panulescu

- Heats — 5:07.74 (→ did not advance)

- Mariana Paraschiv

- Heats — 5:04.56 (→ did not advance)

== Volleyball ==
Women's Team Competition

- Preliminary round (Group B)

- Lost to Bulgaria (1-3)
- Defeated Hungary (3-2)
- Defeated Brazil (3-2)

- Classification Matches

- 5th/8th place: Lost to Peru (0-3)
- 7th/8th place: Lost to Brazil (0-3) → 8th place

- Team Roster

- Mariana Ionescu
- Gabriela Coman
- Doina Savoiu
- Victoria Georgescu
- Ileana Dobroschi
- Victoria Banciu
- Irina Petculet
- Crina Georgescu
- Iuliana Enescu
- Ioana Liteanu
- Corina Crivat
- Elena Piron
Men's Team Competition

- Preliminary round, Group B

- Defeated Libya 3-0 (3, 1, 1)
- Lost to Poland 1-3 (9,-12, -13, -13)
- Defeated Brazil 3-1 (-11, 4, 12, 3)
- Defeated Yugoslavia 3-1 (9, -14, 8, 12)

- Semi-final

- Lost to Soviet Union 0-3 (-6, -10, -5)

- Bronze Medal Match

- Defeated Poland 3-1 (10, -9, 13,9) (→ Bronze Medal)

- Team Roster

- Corneliu Oros
- Laurențiu Dumănoiu
- Dan Gîrleanu
- Nicu Stoian
- Sorin Macovei
- Constantin Sterea
- Neculae Pop
- Günther Enescu
- Corneliu Chifu
- Marius Căta-Chițiga
- Florin Mina
- Viorel Manole

== Water polo ==
Men's team competition

- Preliminary round (Group B)

- Drew with Hungary (6-6)
- Defeated Greece (6-4)
- Lost to Netherlands (3-5)

- Final Round (Group B)

- Lost to Italy (3-5)
- Drew with Australia (4-4)
- Defeated Sweden (8-3)
- Defeated Bulgaria (10-6)
- Defeated Greece (11-8) → 9th place

- Team Roster

- Doru Spînu
- Vasile Ungureanu
- Dorin Viorel Costras
- Adrian Nastasiu
- Dinu Popescu
- Claudiu loan Rusu
- Ilie Slâvei
- Liviu Râducanu
- Viorel Rus
- Adrian Schervan
- Florin Slâvei
