= Volleyball at the 1980 Summer Olympics – Women's team rosters =

The following teams and players took part in the women's volleyball tournament at the 1980 Summer Olympics, in Moscow.

== Rosters ==
=== Brazil ===
- Denise Mattioli
- Ivonete das Neves
- Lenice Oliveira
- Regina Vilela
- Fernanda Silva
- Ana Paula Mello
- Isabel Salgado
- Eliana Aleixo
- Dora Castanheira
- Jacqueline Silva
- Vera Mossa
- Rita Teixeira

Head coach

=== Bulgaria ===
- Tanya Dimitrova
- Valentina Ilieva
- Galina Stancheva
- Silviya Petrunova
- Anka Khristolova
- Verka Borisova
- Margarita Gerasimova
- Rumyana Kaisheva
- Maya Georgieva
- Tanya Gogova
- Tsvetana Bozhurina
- Rositsa Dimitrova

Head coach

=== Cuba ===
- Mercedes Pérez
- Imilsis Téllez
- Ana Díaz
- Mercedes Pomares
- Mavis Guilarte
- Libertad González
- Erenia Díaz
- Maura Alfonso
- Josefina Capote
- Nelly Barnet
- Ana María García
- Lucila Urgelles

Head coach

- Eugenio George

=== East Germany ===
- Ute Kostrzewa
- Andrea Heim
- Annette Schultz
- Christine Mummhardt
- Heike Lehmann
- Barbara Czekalla
- Karla Roffeis
- Martina Schmidt
- Anke Westendorf
- Karin Püschel
- Brigitte Fetzer
- Katharina Bullin

Head coach

=== Hungary ===
- Juliana Szalonna
- Éva Sebők-Szalay
- Gyöngyi Bardi-Gerevich
- Ágnes Juhász-Balajcza
- Lucia Bánhegyi-Radó
- Gabriella Csapó-Fekete
- Emőke Énekes-Szegedi
- Emerencia Siry-Király
- Ágnes Torma
- Erzsébet Pálinkás-Varga
- Gabriella Lengyel
- Bernadett Kőszegi

Head coach

- Gabriella Kotsis

=== Peru ===
- Carmen Pimentel
- Gaby Cárdeñas
- Rosa García
- Raquel Chumpitaz
- Ana Cecilia Carrillo
- María del Risco
- Cecilia Tait
- Silvia León
- Denisse Fajardo
- Aurora Heredia
- Gina Torrealva
- Natalia Málaga

Head coach

=== Romania ===
- Mariana Ionescu
- Gabriela Coman
- Doina Săvoiu
- Victoria Georgescu
- Ileana Dobrovschi
- Victoria Banciu
- Irina Petculeţ
- Corina Georgescu
- Iuliana Enescu
- Ioana Liteanu
- Corina Crivăţ
- Elena Piron

Head coach

=== Soviet Union ===
- Nadezhda Radzevich
- Nataliya Razumova
- Olga Solovova
- Yelena Akhaminova
- Larisa Pavlova
- Yelena Andreyuk
- Irina Makogonova
- Lyubov Kozyreva
- Svetlana Nikishina
- Lyudmila Chernyshyova
- Svetlana Badulina
- Lidiya Loginova

Head coach

- Nikolay Karpol
