= Archery at the 1976 Summer Olympics – Women's individual =

Archery at the Olympics

Women's individual at the Games of the XXI Olympiad
- Venue: Olympic Archery Field, Joliette
- Dates: 27–30 July 1976
- Competitors: 27 from 16 nations
- Winning score: 2499

Medalists
1st place, gold medalist(s)		Luann Ryon	United States
2nd place, silver medalist(s)		Valentina Kovpan	Soviet Union
3rd place, bronze medalist(s)		Zebiniso Rustamova	Soviet Union

The women's individual archery event at the 1976 Summer Olympics was part of the archery programme. The event consisted of a double FITA round. For each round, the archer shot 36 arrows at each of four distances—70, 60, 50, and 30 metres. The highest score for each arrow was 10 points, giving a possible maximum of 2880 points. 16 nations sent 27 athletes to the women's competition in archery.

Luann Ryon of the United States broke both of her countrywoman Doreen Wilber's Olympic records in the event (FITA round and double FITA round) on her way to the second straight gold medal for an American in the women's competition. The Soviet women repeated their bronze medal from 1972 and gained a silver medal as well.

== Records ==
The following new Olympic records were set during this competition.

Record	Round	Name	Nationality	Score	OR
Single FITA round	Second	Luann Ryon	United States	1282	OR
Double FITA round	Combined	Luann Ryon	United States	2499	OR

== Results ==
Rank	Archer	Nation	Round 1 Score	Round 1 Rank	Round 2 Score	Round 2 Rank	Total Score
1st place, gold medalist(s)	Luann Ryon	United States	1217	1	1282 (OR)	1	2499 (OR)
2nd place, silver medalist(s)	Valentyna Kovpan	Soviet Union	1182	7	1278	2	2460
3rd place, bronze medalist(s)	Zebiniso Rustamova	Soviet Union	1202	3	1205	7	2407
4	Jang Sun-yong	North Korea	1200	5	1205	6	2405
5	Lucille Lemay	Canada	1181	8	1220	3	2401
6	Jadwiga Wilejto	Poland	1200	4	1195	9	2395
7	Linda Myers	United States	1180	9	1213	5	2393
8	Maria Urban	West Germany	1216	2	1160	15	2376
9	Leane Suniar	Indonesia	1134	15	1218	4	2352
10	Han Sun-hi	North Korea	1163	10	1184	11	2347
11	Anna-Lisa Berglund	Sweden	1199	6	1141	17	2340
12	Franca Capetta	Italy	1152	13	1187	10	2339
13	Lena Sjöholm	Sweden	1123	19	1199	8	2322
14	Minako Sato	Japan	1128	17	1180	13	2308
15	Carole Toy	Australia	1123	20	1182	12	2305
16	Wanda Allan	Canada	1154	12	1149	16	2303
17	Marie-Christine Ventrillon	France	1163	11	1135	19	2298
18	Amornrat Kaewbaidhoon	Thailand	1110	21	1172	14	2282
19	Ida Da Poian	Italy	1147	14	1135	20	2282
20	Irena Szydłowska	Poland	1127	8	1137	18	2264
21	Patricia Conway	Great Britain	1131	16	1126	21	2257
22	Natjav Dariimaa	Mongolia	1105	22	1104	22	2209
23	Rachael Fenwick	Great Britain	1095	23	1104	23	2199
24	Gombosure Enkhtaivan	Mongolia	1062	25	1094	24	2156
25	Maureen Adams	Australia	1076	24	1038	25	2114
26	Kyoko Yamazaki	Japan	1060	26	1034	26	2094
27	Maria Medina	Puerto Rico	962	27	1031	27	1993
