= Archery at the 1980 Summer Olympics – Women's individual =

Archery at the Olympics

Women's individual at the Games of the XXII Olympiad
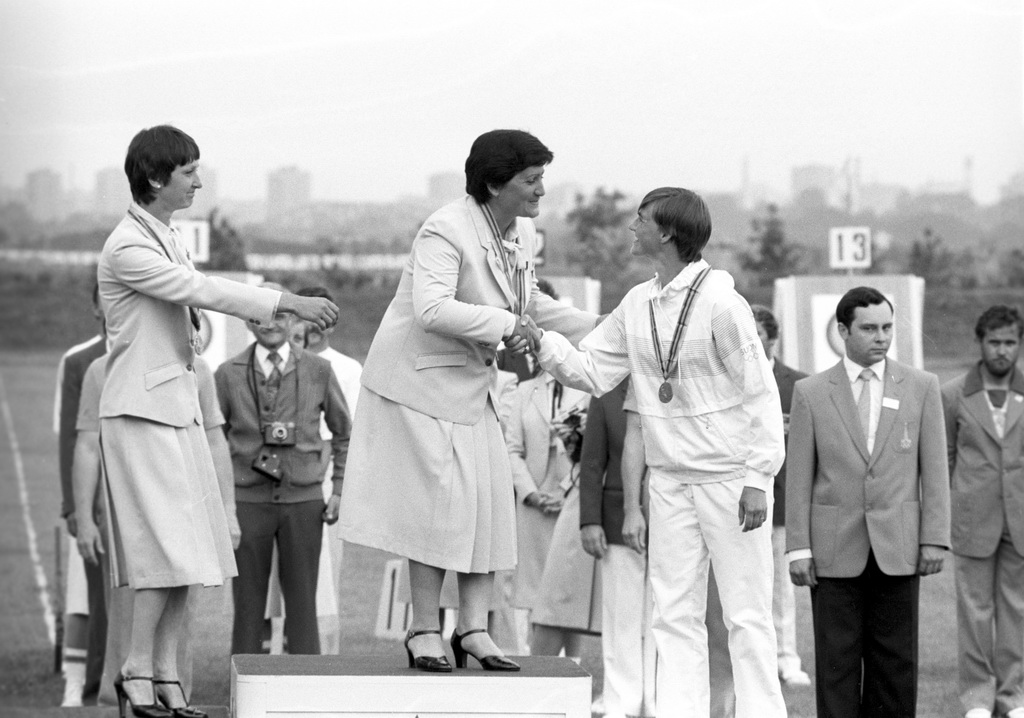
- Venue: Krylatskoye Sports Complex Archery Field
- Dates: 30 July – 2 August 1980
- Competitors: 29 from 18 nations
- Winning score: 2491

Medalists
1st place, gold medalist(s)		Keto Losaberidze	Soviet Union
2nd place, silver medalist(s)		Natalya Butuzova	Soviet Union
3rd place, bronze medalist(s)		Päivi Meriluoto	Finland

The women's individual archery event at the 1980 Summer Olympics was part of the archery programme. The event consisted of a double FITA round. For each round, the archer shot 36 arrows at each of four distances—70, 60, 50, and 30 metres. The highest score for each arrow was 10 points, giving a possible maximum of 2880 points.

The gold medal went to Ketevan Losaberidze, the top Soviet archer of the 1970s. Losaberidze also won World team titles in 1973 and 1981, a European individual title in 1972 and European team titles in 1972, 1978 and 1980. The silver medal in Moscow went to her teammate, Natalya Butuzova, later the 1981 World Champion, and winner of the European Championship in 1980 and 1982.

== Results ==
Rank	Archer	Nation	Round 1 Score	Round 1 Rank	Round 2 Score	Round 2 Rank	Total Score
1st place, gold medalist(s)	Keto Losaberidze	Soviet Union	1257	1	1234	1	2491
2nd place, silver medalist(s)	Natalya Butuzova	Soviet Union	1251	2	1226	3	2477
3rd place, bronze medalist(s)	Päivi Meriluoto	Finland	1217	3	1232	2	2449
4	Zdeňka Padevětová	Czechoslovakia	1206	4	1199	5	2405
5	Gwang Sun-o	North Korea	1195	5	1206	4	2401
6	Catharina Floris	Netherlands	1186	7	1196	6	2382
7	Maria Szeliga	Poland	1190	6	1175	8	2365
8	Lotti Tschanz	Switzerland	1184	8	1162	13	2346
9	Terene Donovan	Australia	1172	10	1171	10	2343
10	Franca Capetta	Italy	1164	12	1178	7	2342
11	Jadwiga Wilejto	Poland	1165	11	1163	12	2328
12	Judit Kovács	Hungary	1155	13	1168	11	2323
13	Aurora Chin	Romania	1174	9	1145	17	2319
14	Carita Jussila	Finland	1140	15	1158	15	2298
15	Carole Toy	Australia	1123	17	1162	14	2285
16	Anna-Lisa Berglund	Sweden	1140	14	1143	18	2283
17	Sok Chang-suk	North Korea	1119	18	1150	16	2269
18	Erika Ulrich	Switzerland	1069	27	1171	9	2240
19	Hazel Greene	Ireland	1123	16	1106	22	2229
20	Jitka Dolejsi	Czechoslovakia	1102	21	1117	20	2219
21	Margit Szobi	Hungary	1082	26	1134	19	2216
22	Gillian Patterson	Great Britain	1114	19	1102	23	2216
23	Chagdaryne Biambasuren	Mongolia	1108	20	1108	21	2216
24	Terezia Preda	Romania	1097	22	1098	26	2195
25	Christine Harris	Great Britain	1087	24	1100	25	2187
26	Arci Kempner	Brazil	1084	25	1102	24	2186
27	Tsvetanka Stoycheva	Bulgaria	1089	23	1055	29	2144
28	Joanna Agius	Malta	1052	29	1067	27	2119
29	Tsedendorj Bazarsuren	Mongolia	1053	28	1059	28	2112
