= Lena Sjöholm =

Swedish archer (born 1946)

Lena Sjöholm (born 7 August 1946) represented Sweden internationally at archery.

== Career ==
Sjöholm competed in the 1973 and 1975 World Archery Championships in the women's individual and team events.

She finished thirteenth in the women's individual event at the 1976 Summer Olympics with a score of 2322 points.
