= Linda Myers =

Linda Myers may refer to:

- Linda K. Myers (born 1940), American politician in Vermont
- Linda Myers (archer) (born 1947), American archer
