= Vasilache =

Vasilache is a surname. Notable people with the surname include:

- Ciprian Vasilache (born 1983), Romanian footballer
- Lucian Vasilache (born 1954), Romanian handball player
- Ştefan Vasilache (born 1979), Romanian high jumper
- Vasile Vasilache (1926–2008), Moldovan writer
