= Pat Conway (disambiguation) =

Pat Conway (1931–1981) was an American actor.

Pat Conway, Patricia Conway, or Patrick Conway may also refer to:

- Pat Conway (politician) (born 1947), American politician
- Patricia Conway (architect), American architect
- Patricia Conway (archer) (born 1944), British Olympic archer
- Patrick Conway (1865–1929), American bandleader
- Patrick H. Conway (born 1974), American physician
