= List of Olympic venues in archery =

For the Summer Olympics, there are 20 venues that have been or will be used for archery.

Games	Venue	Other sports hosted at venue for games	Capacity	Ref.
1900 Paris	Bois de Vincennes	None	Not listed.	
1904 St. Louis	Francis Field	Athletics, Cycling, Football, Gymnastics, Lacrosse, Roque, Tennis, Tug of war, Weightlifting, and Wrestling	19,000.	
1908 London	White City Stadium	Athletics, Cycling (track), Diving, Field hockey, Football, Gymnastics, Lacrosse, Rugby union, Swimming, Tug of war, Water polo (final), Wrestling	97,000.	
1920 Antwerp	Nachtegalen Park	None	Not listed.	
1972 Munich	Bogenschießanlage	None	1,100	
1976 Montreal	Olympic Archery Field, Joliette	None	2,000	
1980 Moscow	Krylatskoye Sports Complex Archery Field	None	3,000	
1984 Los Angeles	El Dorado Park	None	4,000	
1988 Seoul	Hwarang Archery Field	None	1,200	
1992 Barcelona	Olympic Archery Field	None	Not listed.	
1996 Atlanta	Stone Mountain Park Archery Center and Velodrome	Cycling (track)	5,200 (archery); 6,000 (cycling track)	
2000 Sydney	Sydney International Archery Park	None	17,500	
2004 Athens	Panathinaiko Stadium	Athletics (marathon finish)	7,500 (archery); 34,500 (athletics marathon finish)	
2008 Beijing	Olympic Green Archery Field	None	5,000	
2012 London	Lord's Cricket Ground	None	6,500 (temporary)	
2016 Rio de Janeiro	Sambódromo	Athletics (marathon)	36,000	
2020 Tokyo	Dream Island Archery Field	None	5,600	
2024 Paris	Les Invalides	Athletics (marathon finish)	6,000	
2028 Los Angeles	South Bay Sports Park Stadium	Rugby sevens	27,000	
2032 Brisbane	TBD, Maryborough	None	4,000	

== Gallery of venues ==
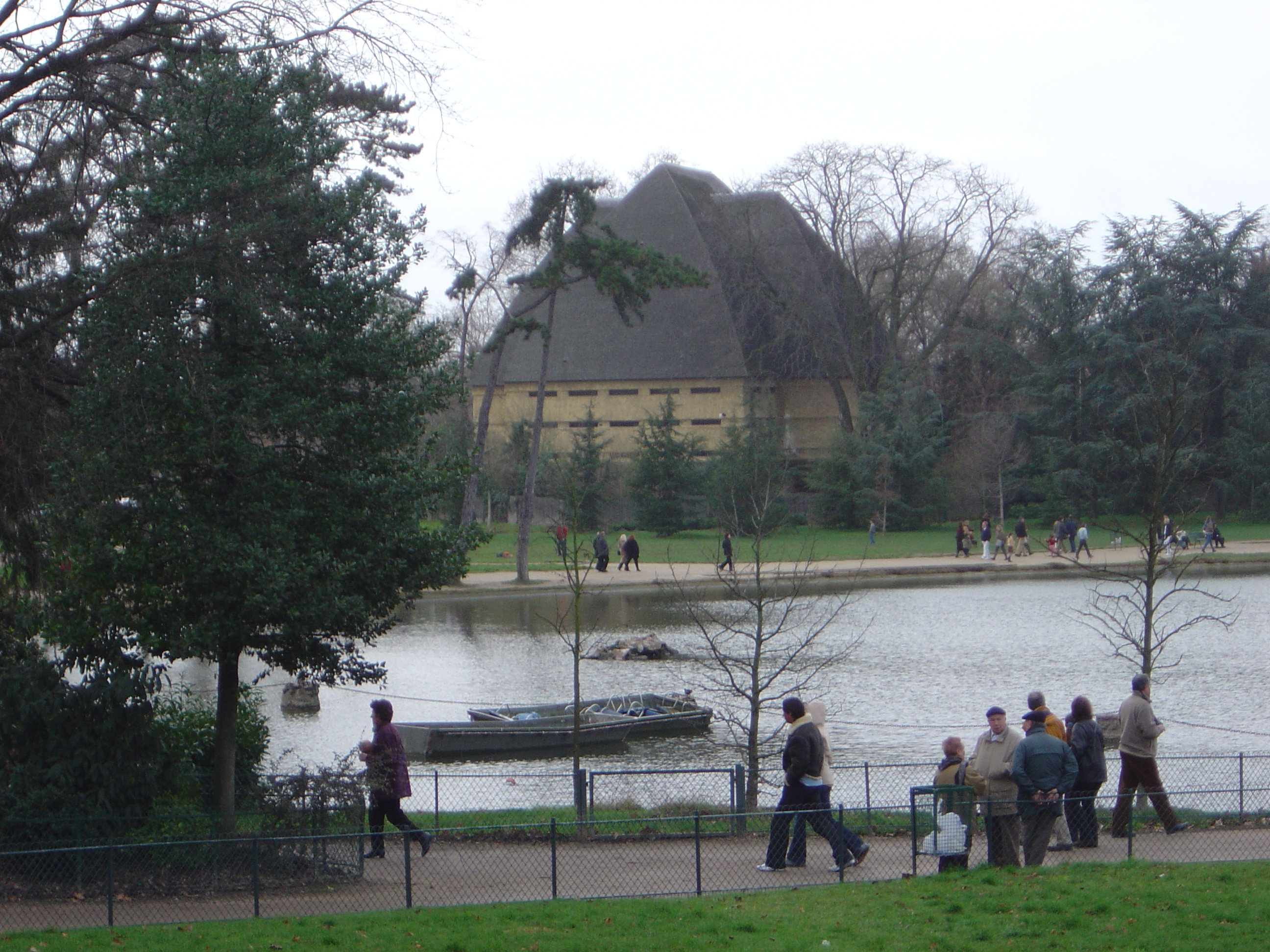
Bois de Vincennes hosted the first archery competitions at the 1900 Summer Olympics in Paris.

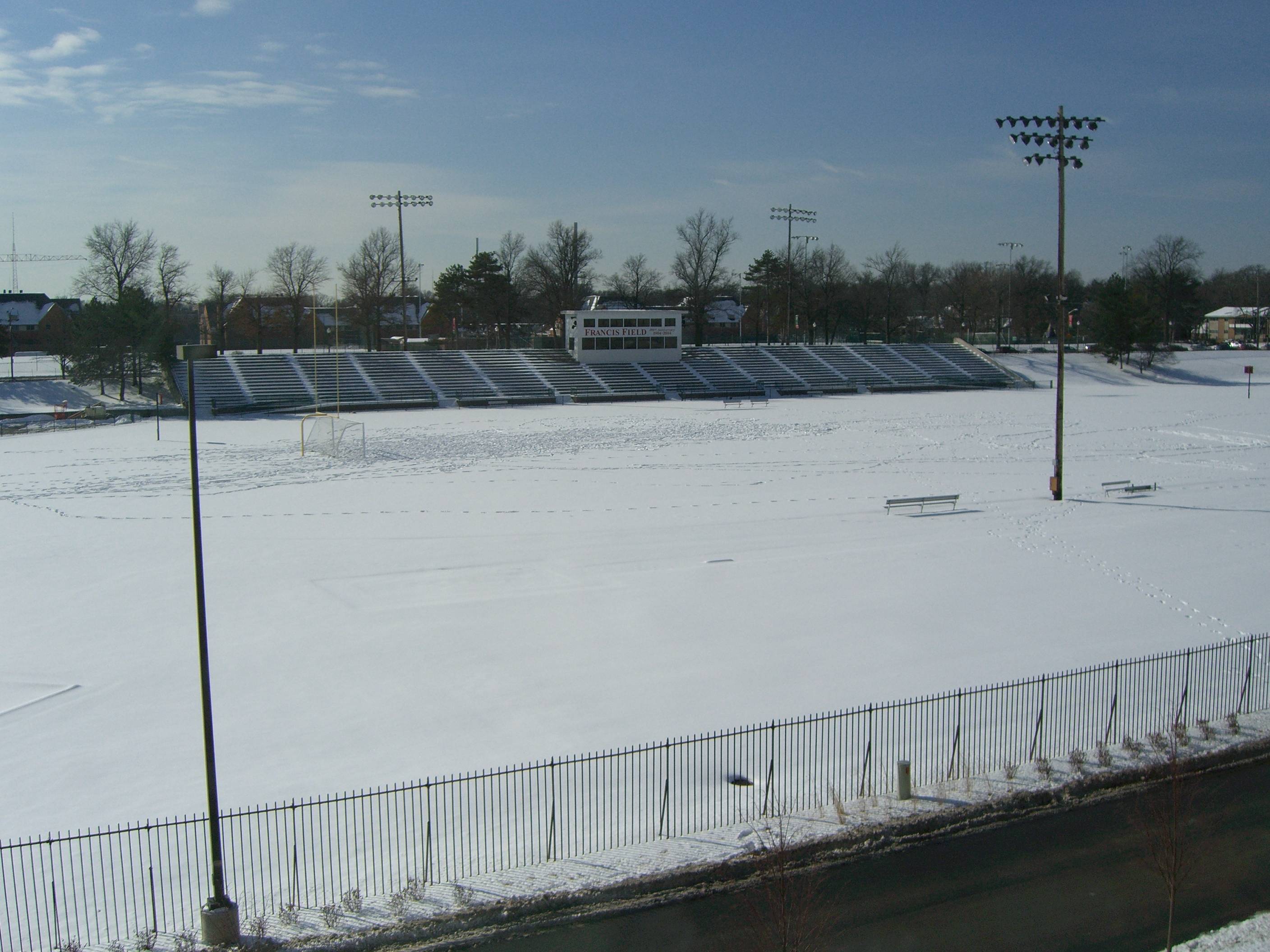
Francis Field hosted archery at the 1904 Summer Olympics in St. Louis.

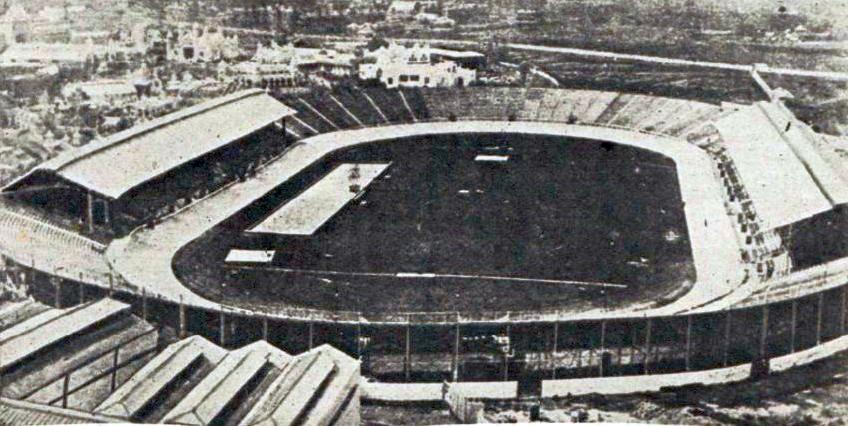
White City Stadium hosted archery at the 1908 Summer Olympics in London.

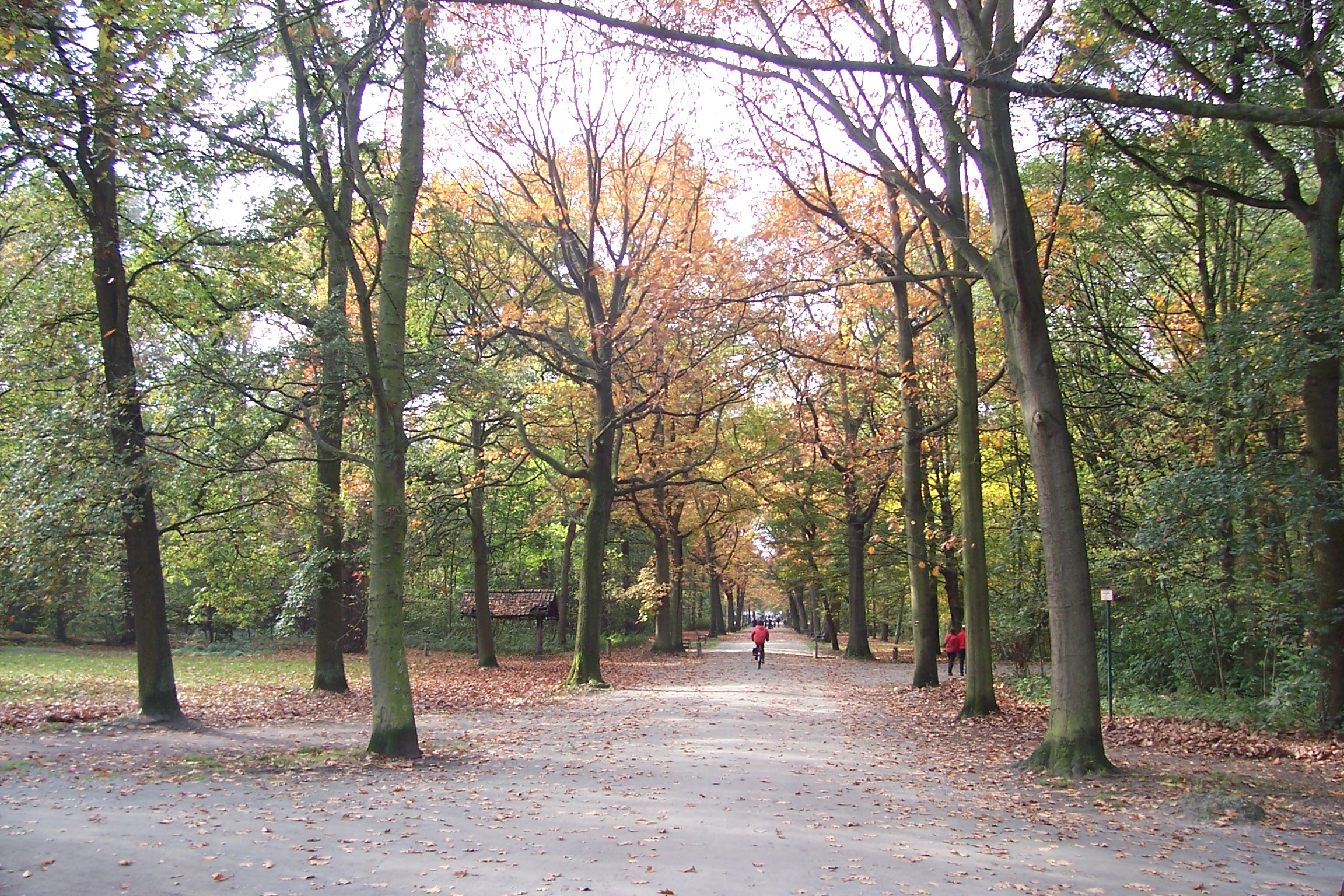
Nachtegalen Park hosted archery at the 1920 Summer Olympics in Antwerp.

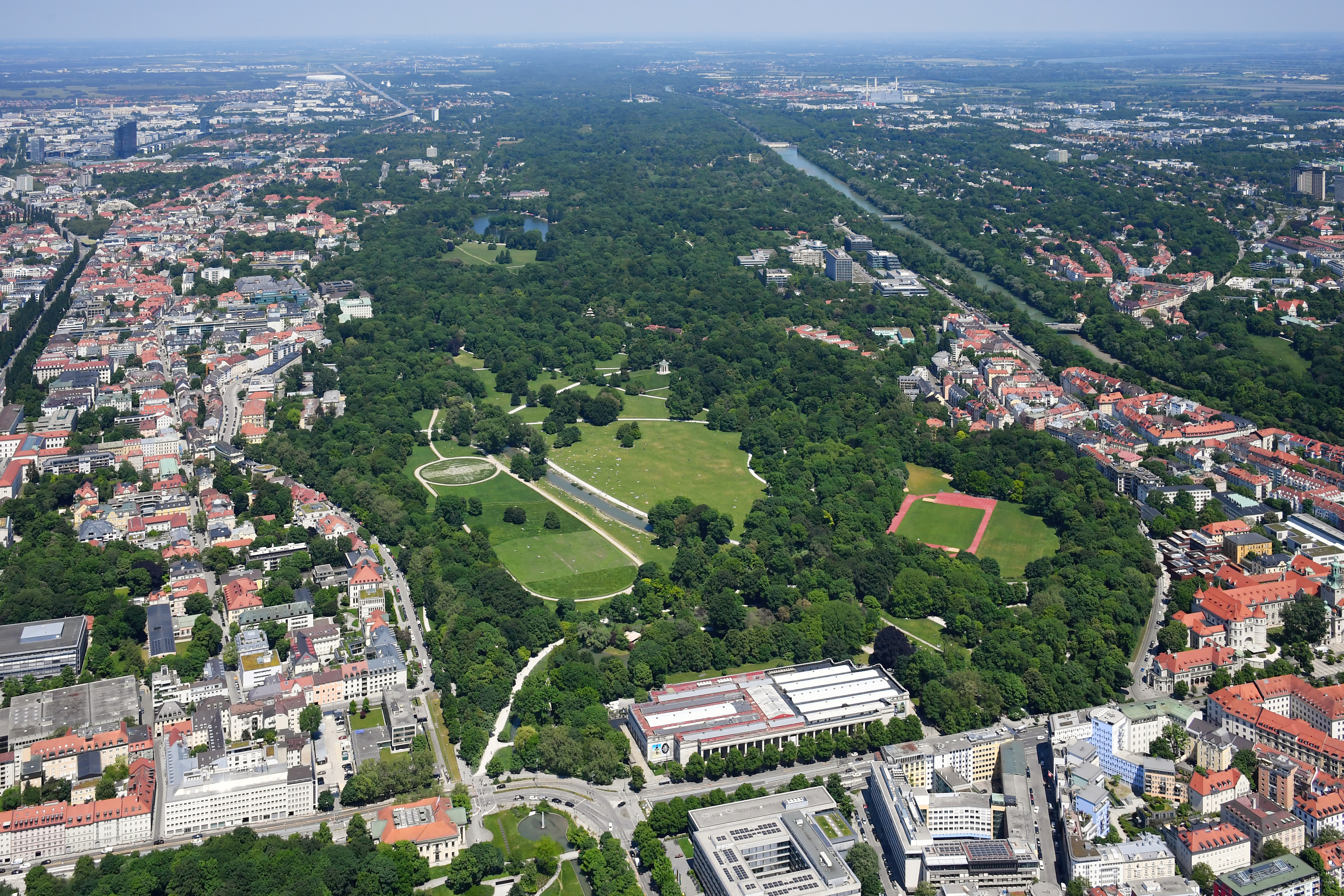
Englischer Garten hosted archery at the 1972 Summer Olympics in Munich.

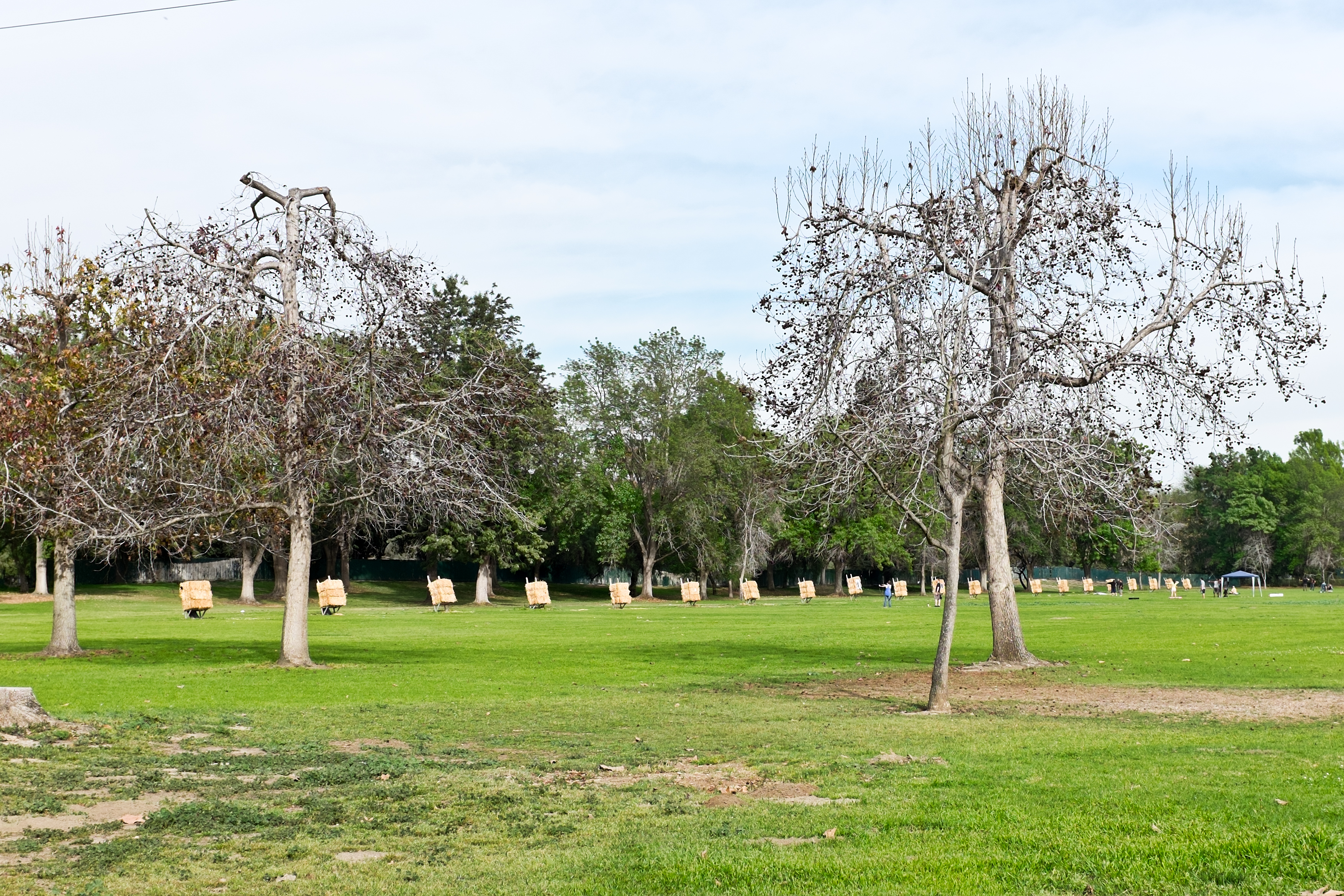
El Dorado Regional Park hosted archery at the 1984 Summer Olympics in Los Angeles.

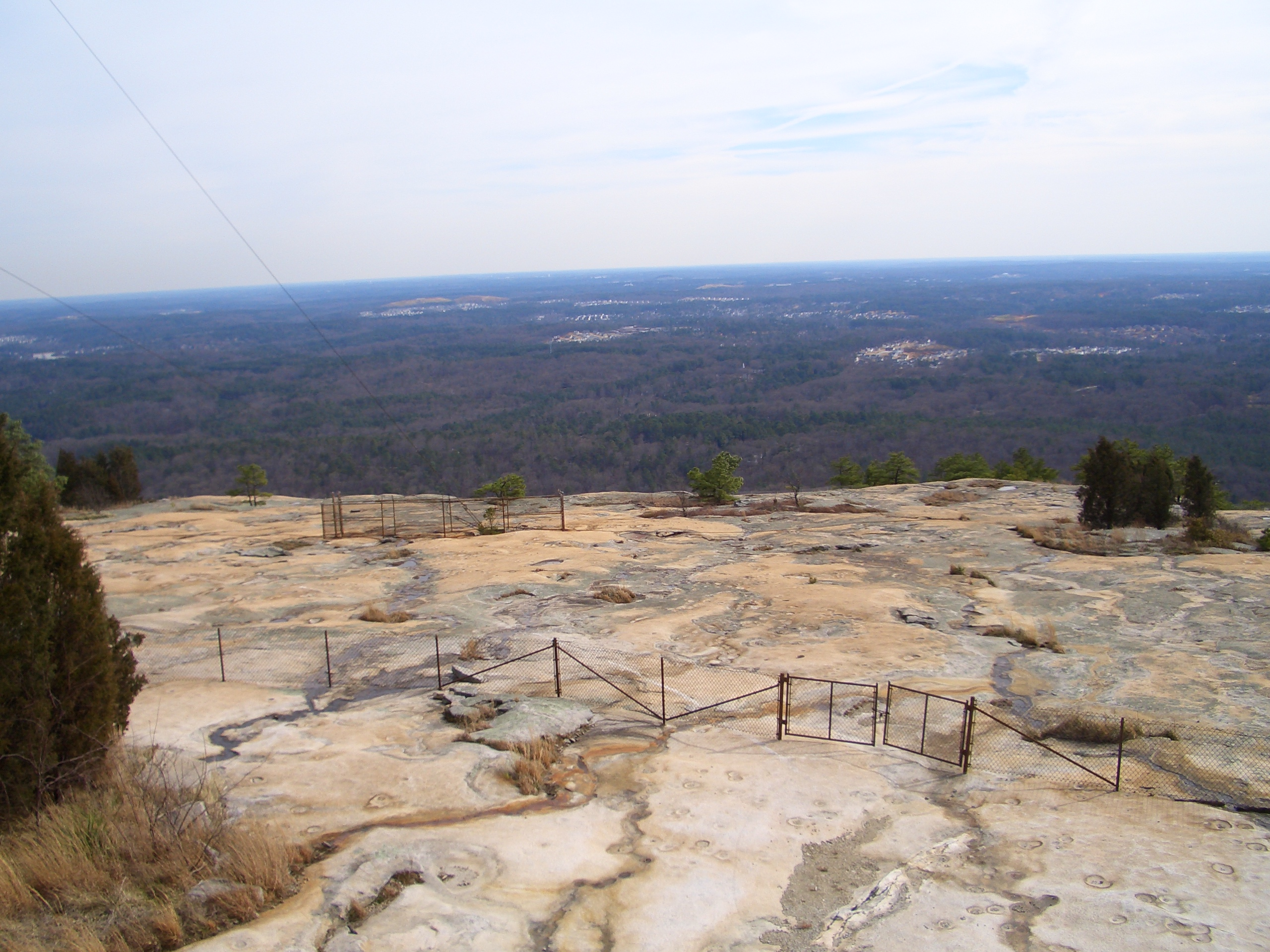
Stone Mountain Park hosted archery at the 1996 Summer Olympics in Atlanta.

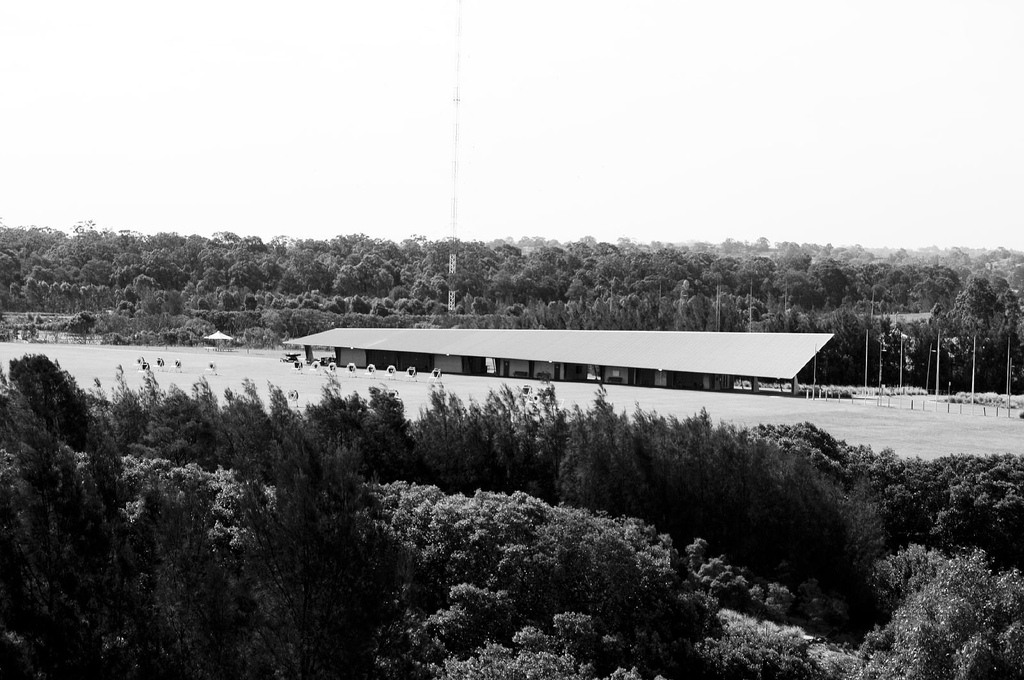
Sydney International Archery Park hosted archery at the 2000 Summer Olympics.

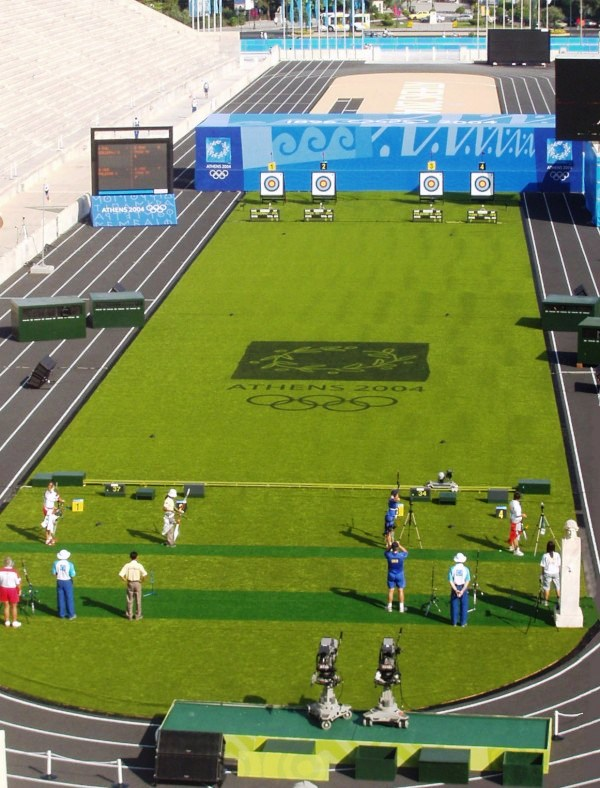
Panathinaiko Stadium hosted the archery competitions and the marathon finish for the 2004 Summer Olympics in Athens.

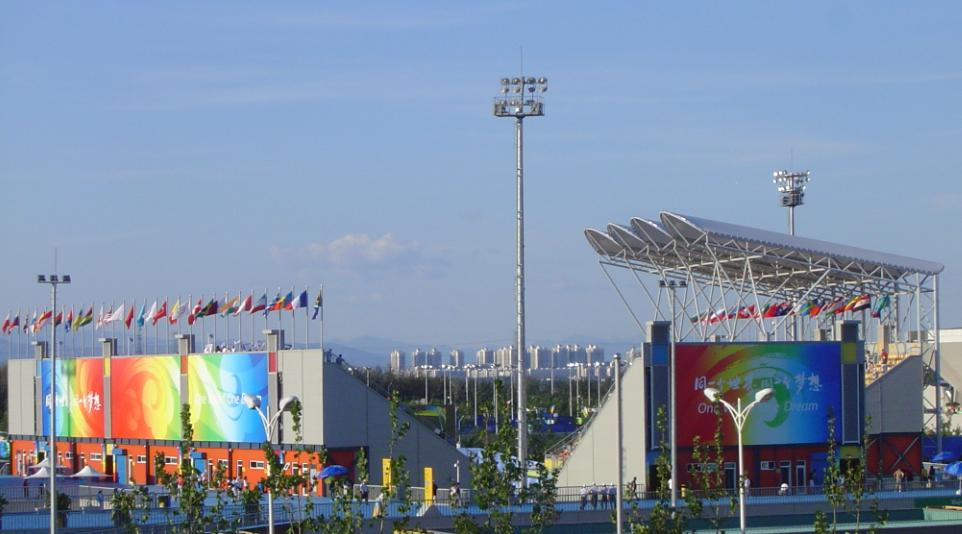
Olympic Green Archery Field hosted archery at the 2008 Summer Olympics in Beijing.

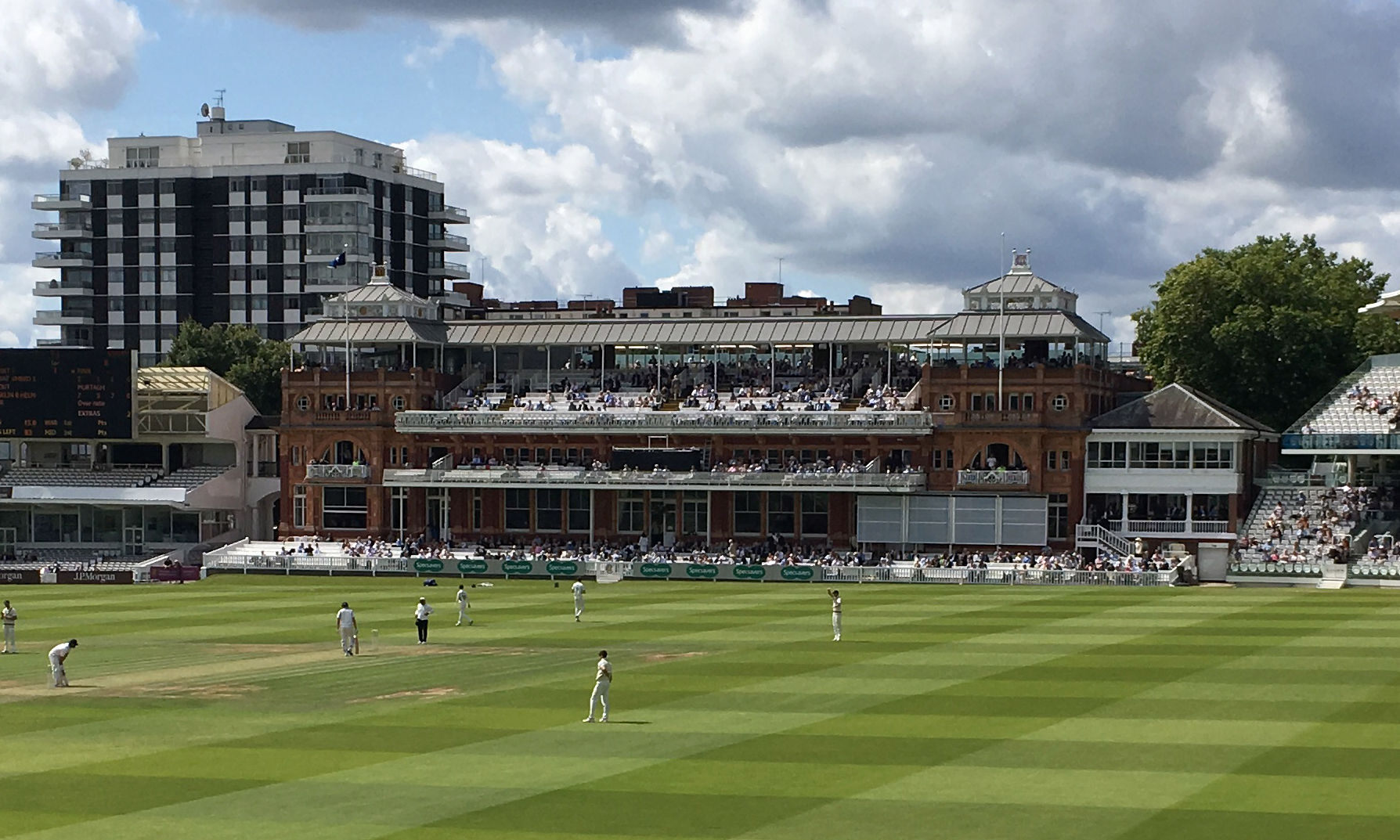
Lords Cricket Ground hosted archery at the 2012 Summer Olympics in London.

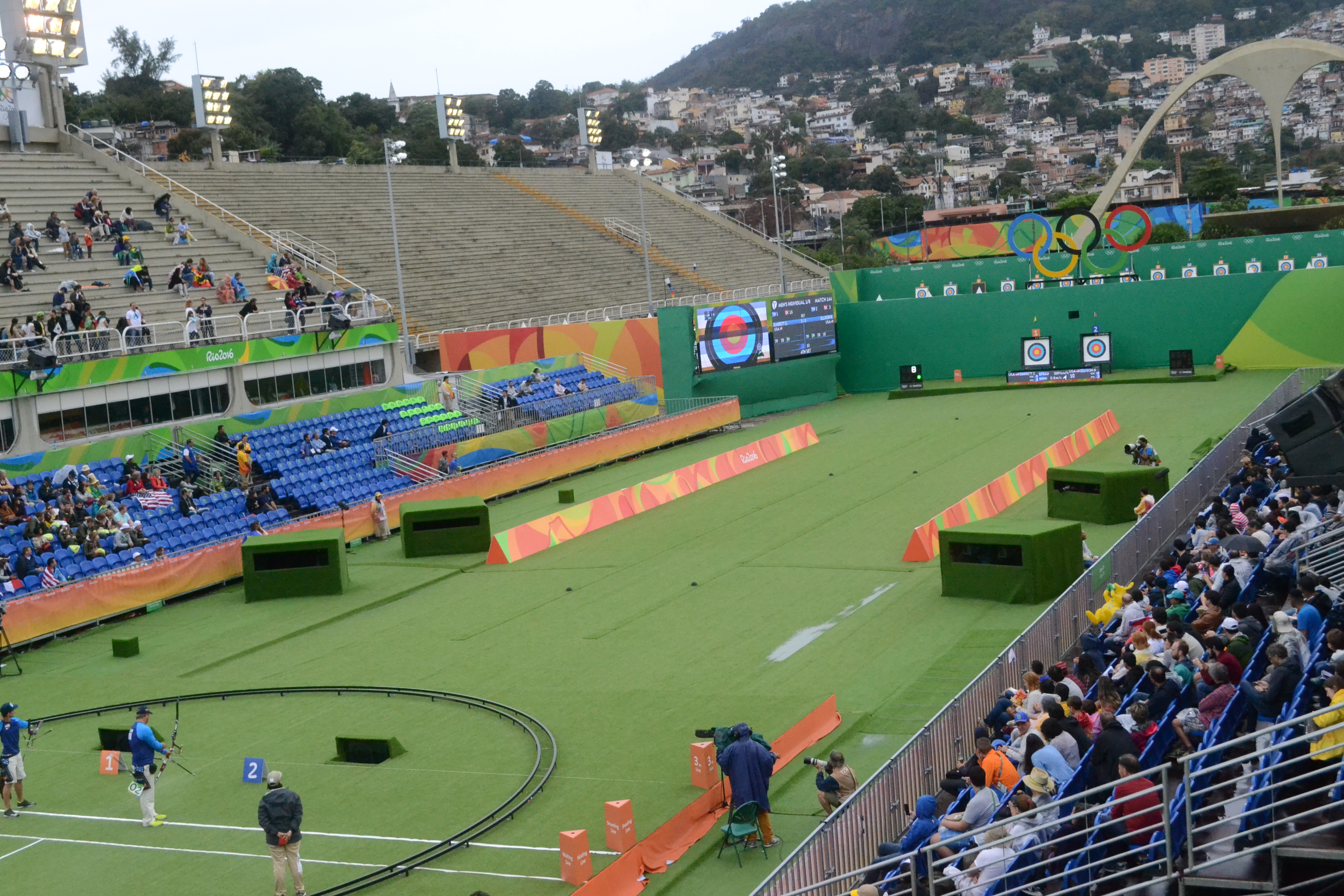
Sambódromo hosted the archery competitions and the marathon finish for the 2016 Summer Olympics in Rio de Janeiro.

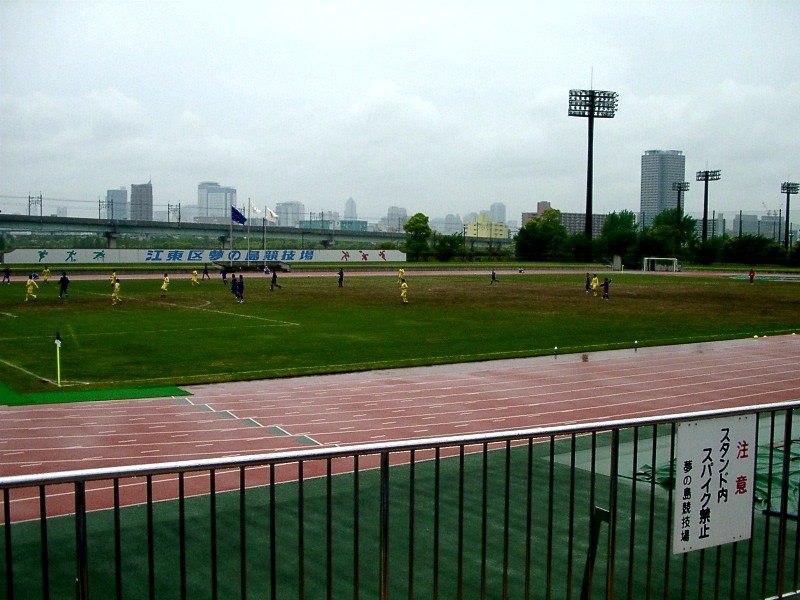
Yumenoshima Park hosted archery at the 2020 Summer Olympics in Tokyo.

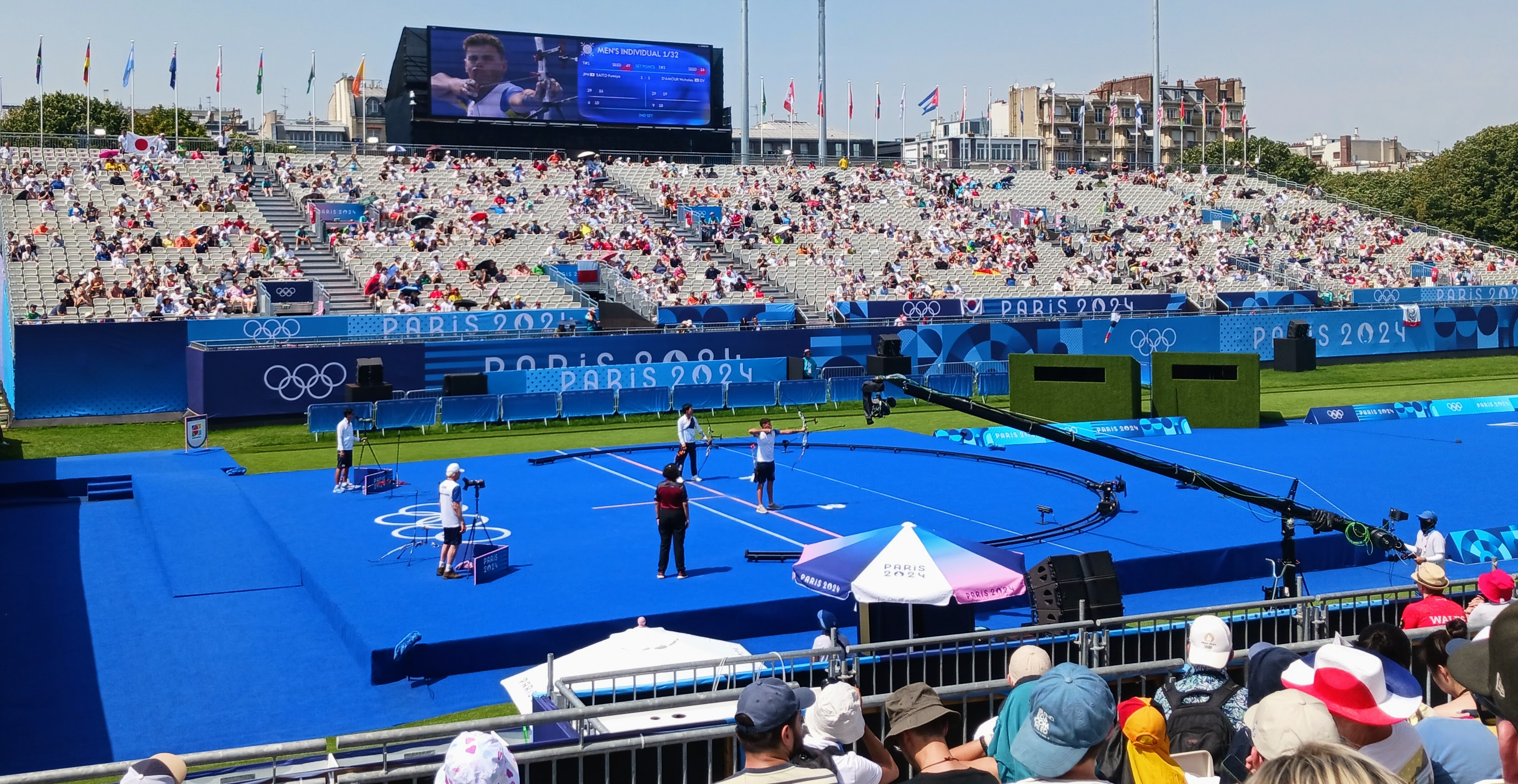
Les Invalides hosted archery at the 2024 Summer Olympics in Paris.

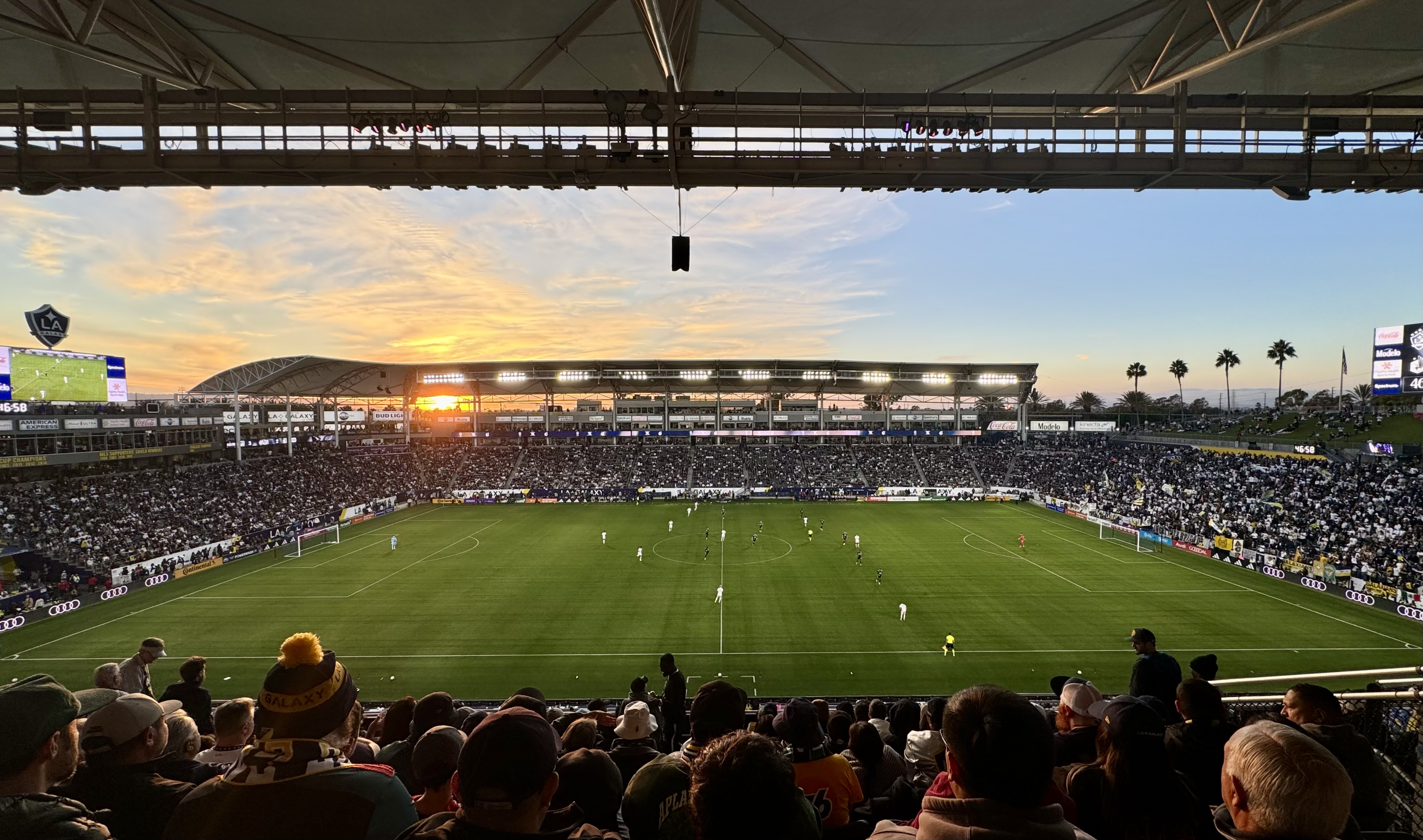
Dignity Health Sports Park will host archery at the 2028 Summer Olympics in Los Angeles.
