= 1975 World Archery Championships =

- Location: Interlaken, Switzerland
- Start date: 25 June
- End date: 28 June
- Competitors: 232

The 1975 World Archery Championships was the 28th edition of the event. It was held in Interlaken, Switzerland on 25–28 June 1975 and was organised by World Archery Federation (FITA).

== Medals summary ==
=== Recurve ===
| Event | Gold | Silver | Bronze |
|---|---|---|---|
| Men's individual | Darrell Pace; United States | Richard McKinney; United States | Kauko Laasonen; Finland |
| Women's individual | Zebiniso Rustamova; Soviet Union | Valentina Kovpan; Soviet Union | Han Sun-hi; North Korea |
| Men's team | United States; Darrell Pace; Richard McKinney; Rodney Baston | Japan; Hirose Akira; Tezima Masaki; Nishi Takanobu | Finland; Kauko Laasonen; Olli Tahvonen; Jukka Inkert |
| Women's team | Soviet Union; Zebiniso Rustamova; Valentina Kovpan; Wirwe Holtsmeier | North Korea; Han Sun-hi; Kim Hyang-min; Djang Sun-yung | United States; Linda Myers; Irene Lorensen; Ruth Rowe |

== Medals table ==
| Rank | Nation | Gold | Silver | Bronze | Total |
|---|---|---|---|---|---|
| 1 | United States | 2 | 1 | 1 | 4 |
| 2 | Soviet Union | 2 | 1 | 0 | 3 |
| 3 | North Korea | 0 | 1 | 1 | 2 |
| 4 | Japan | 0 | 1 | 0 | 1 |
| 5 | Finland | 0 | 0 | 2 | 2 |
| Totals (5 entries) | | 4 | 4 | 4 | 12 |
