= Gillian Patterson =

British archer (born 1963)

Gillian Patterson (born 26 September 1963) is a former British archer.

== Early life ==
She originated from Boldon, attending Boldon School, and took 6 O-levels.

Her father Stan, her coach, represented the Grand National Archery Society on the British Olympic Association. She was picked with Christine Harris (archer) from Bristol

== Career ==
Patterson joined Cleadon Archers. In 1976 Patterson became a senior Master Bowman at the age of thirteen. She was selected for the Great British archery team in 1979 and competed in the World Archery Championships the same year and finished 28th.

At the 1980 Summer Olympic Games she took part in the women's individual event and finished 22nd with 2216 points scored.
