= Wanda Allan =

Canadian archer (born 1955)

Wanda Marie Allan-Parsons (born 24 January 1955) is a Canadian archer.

== Career ==
She finished fourth in the women's team at the 1975 World Archery Championships.

Allan competed in the women's individual event at the 1976 Summer Olympics finishing sixteenth and also in the women's individual event at the 1984 Summer Olympics where she came 36th.

She was inducted into the Victoria Sports Hall of Fame in 2017 while working as a quilter.
