= Minako Sato =

Japanese archer

Minako Sato (佐藤 美奈子, Satō Minako, born 20 September 1955) is a Japanese archer who competed in two Olympic Games.

== Career ==
Sato finished 14th in the women's individual event at the 1976 Summer Olympics with a score of 2308 points. She came tenth in the women's individual event at the 1984 Summer Olympics with a score of 2481 points.
