= Andrei Șeran =

Romanian footballer

Personal information
- Full name: Andrei Lorel Șeran
- Date of birth: 11 March 1985 (age 41)
- Place of birth: Târgoviște, Romania
- Height: 1.92 m (6 ft 3 1/2 in)
- Position: Defender

Team information
- Current team: Chindia Târgoviște
- Number: 21

Senior career*
Years	Team	Apps	(Gls)
2007–2008	Forex Brașov	2	(0)
2008–2012	SKA-Energiya Khabarovsk	53	(0)
2012–2013	Voința Sibiu	2	(0)
2013	Chindia Târgoviște	8	(1)
- * Club domestic league appearances and goals as of 14:00, 7 June 2017 (UTC)

Andrei Lorel Șeran (born 11 March 1985 in Târgoviște) is a Romanian professional football player.
