= Marie-Christine Ventrillon =

French archer

Personal information
- Nationality: French
- Born: 11 March 1949 (age 76); France
- Height: 172 cm (5 ft 8 in)
- Weight: 66 kg (146 lb)

Sport
- Country: France
- Sport: Archery

Marie-Christine Ventrillon is a French Olympic archer. She represented her country in the women's individual competition at the 1976 Summer Olympics. She came 17th place after both rounds, finishing with 2298 points.
