= 1973 World Archery Championships =

- Location: Grenoble, France
- Start date: 23 July
- End date: 29 July
- Competitors: 183

The 1973 World Archery Championships was the 27th edition of the event. It was held in Grenoble, France on 23–29 July 1973 and was organised by World Archery Federation (FITA).

It was the first World Championships to be held since Archery became an Olympic sport.

== Medals summary ==
=== Recurve ===
| Event | Gold | Silver | Bronze |
|---|---|---|---|
| Men's individual | Victor Sidoruk; Soviet Union | Kyösti Laasonen; Finland | Stephen Lieberman; United States |
| Women's individual | Linda Myers; United States | Valentina Kovpan; Soviet Union | Emma Gapchenko; Soviet Union |
| Men's team | United States; Stephen Lieberman; Edwin Murray Eliason; Larry Smith | Soviet Union; Victor Sidoruk; Alexandr Panzhin; Alexandr Aulov | Finland; Kyösti Laasonen; Aaro Myllymaki; Emiel Vercaigne |
| Women's team | Soviet Union; Valentina Kovpan; Emma Gapchenko; Keto Lossaberidze | United States; Linda Myers; Doreen Wilber; Debbie Green | United Kingdom; Pauline Edwards; Barbara Strickland; Pam White |

== Medals table ==
| Rank | Nation | Gold | Silver | Bronze | Total |
|---|---|---|---|---|---|
| 1 | Soviet Union | 2 | 2 | 1 | 5 |
| 2 | United States | 2 | 1 | 1 | 4 |
| 3 | Finland | 0 | 1 | 1 | 2 |
| 4 | Great Britain | 0 | 0 | 1 | 1 |
| Totals (4 entries) | | 4 | 4 | 4 | 12 |
