= Victor Sidoruk =

Ukrainian archer (born 1937)

Medal record

Men's Archery

Representing Soviet Union

World Championships
Gold medal – first place	1973 Grenoble	Individual
Silver medal – second place	1973 Grenoble	Team

Victor Vasilevich Sidoruk (Cyrillic:Виктор Васильевич Сидорук; born 4 September 1937 in Lviv, Ukraine SSR, USSR) is a Ukrainian archer who represented the Soviet Union.

== Career ==
Sidoruk won the inaugural USSR national championships in Tallinn in 1963, before going on to represent the USSR at the 1972 Olympics, where he finished 7th. The next year, he became World Champion at the 1973 World Archery Championships in Grenoble.

In 1976 he returned to the Olympics as coach to the USSR team. He also coached the surprise gold medal winning Spanish team at the 1992 Olympics, and as of 2013 is the head national coach of Ukraine.
