= Arci Kempner =

Brazilian archer (born 1934)

Arci Zélia Mensch Kempner (born 3 February 1934) is a Brazilian archer. She won a bronze medal in the 1979 Pan American Games.

== Career ==
Kempner won a bronze medal alongside Claudia Nunez and Daisy Schmidt in the women's recurve event.

She finished 26th in the women's individual event with 2186 points scored.

Kempner tried to compete at the 2007 Pan American Games but was unable to due to having breast cancer.
