= Franca Capetta =

Italian archer (1936–2023)

- Born: 8 December 1936; Este, Padua, Italy
- Died: 5 July 2023 (aged 86); Milan, Italy
- Occupation: Archer

Franca Capetta (8 December 1936 – 5 July 2023) was an Italian archer.

== Career ==
Born in Este, in the 1970s Capetta set numerous national records in indoor and outdoor, and was the first Italian athlete to pass the milestone of 1200 points. She took part in the women's individual event at the 1976 Summer Olympic Games and finished 12th with a score of 2399 points.

In 1979, she won a gold medal at the Mediterranean Games.

Capetta participated in the women's individual at the 1980 Summer Olympic Games and finished tenth with 2342 points. She retired in 1985 but continued to participate in archery events.

== Death ==
Capetta died on 5 July 2023, at the age of 86.
