= Bazna =

- Commune
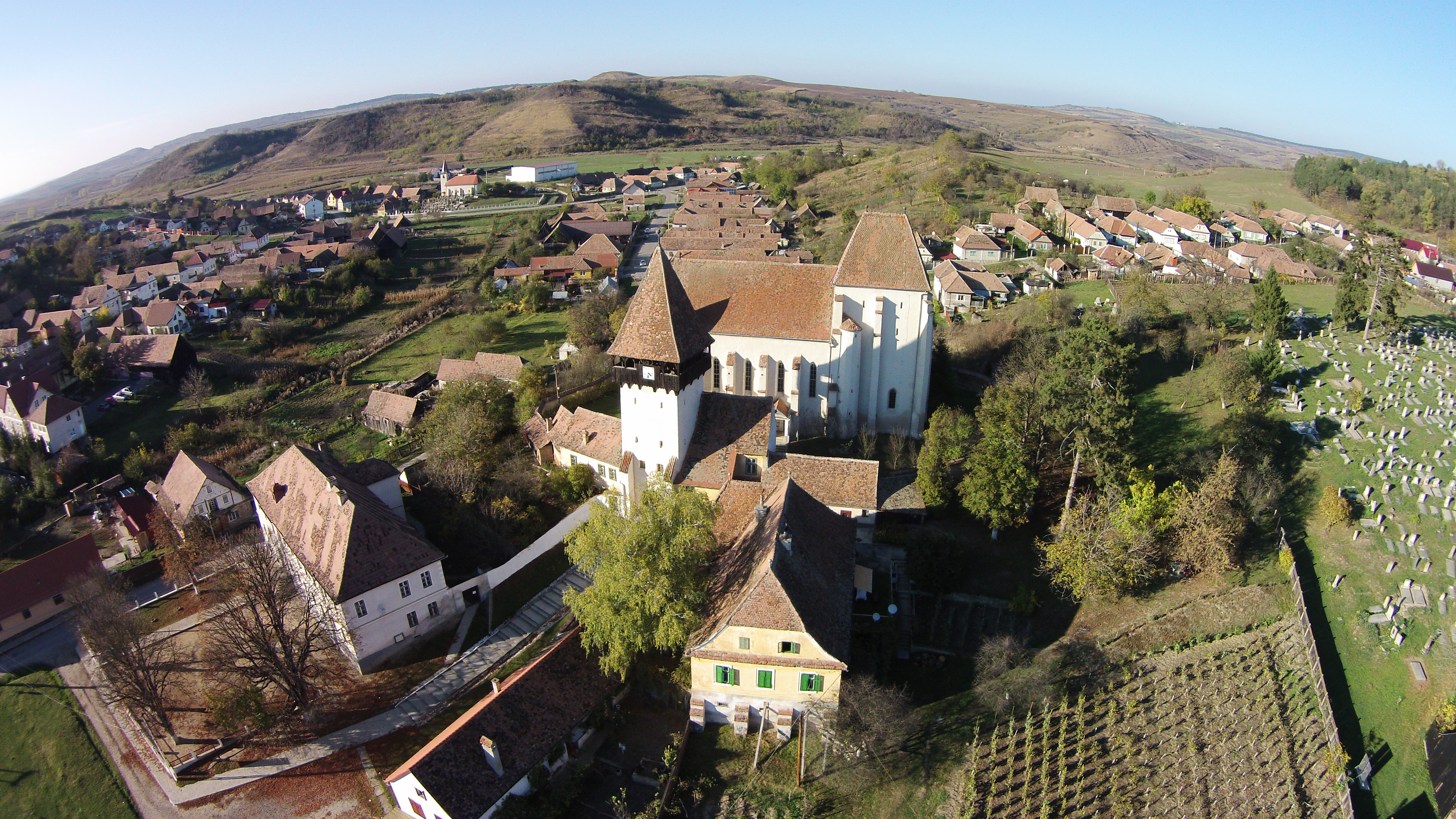
- View of Bazna village and its central fortified church

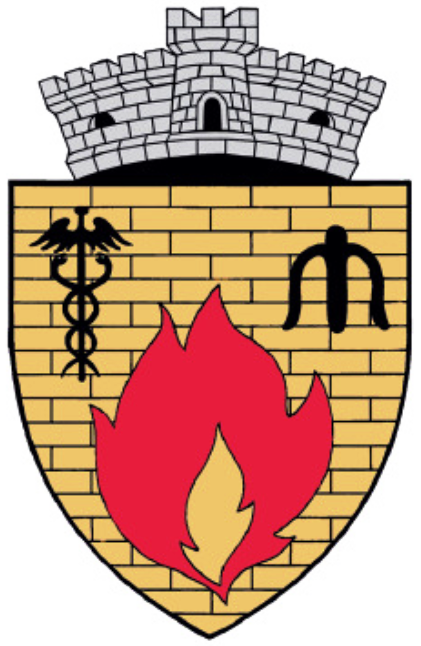
- Coat of arms

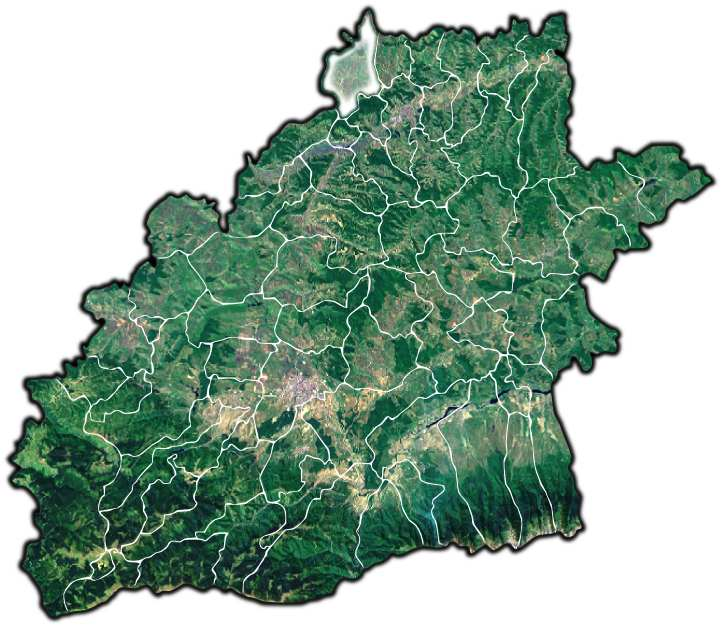
- Location in Sibiu County

- Location in Romania
- Coordinates: 46°12′N 24°17′E
- Country: Romania
- County: Sibiu

Government
  - Mayor (2024–2028): Octavian Alin Limbășan (PSD)
- Area: 82.4 km^{2} (31.8 sq mi)
- Elevation: 312 m (1,024 ft)
- Population (2021-12-01): 3,329
  - Density: 40.4/km^{2} (105/sq mi)
- Time zone: UTC+02:00 (EET)
  - Summer (DST): UTC+03:00 (EEST)
- Postal code: 557030
- Area code: +(40) 0269
- Vehicle reg.: SB
- Website: comunabazna.ro

Bazna (German: Baaßen; Transylvanian Saxon dialect: Baußen; Hungarian: Bázna) is a commune located in Sibiu County, Transylvania, Romania. It is composed of three villages: Bazna, Boian (Bonnesdorf; Bonnesdref; Alsóbajom), and Velț (Wölz; Welz; Velc or Völc). The route of the Via Transilvanica long-distance trail passes through the village of Bazna.

== Geography ==
The commune lies on the western side of the Transylvanian Plateau, within the catchment area of the Târnava Mică River. It is located in the northwestern corner of Sibiu County, 13 km (8.1 mi) northeast of Mediaș and 60 km (37 mi) north of the county seat, Sibiu, on the border with Alba and Mureș counties.

== History ==
Settled by Transylvanian Saxons in the 13th century, in 1876 the Bazna area became part of Austria-Hungary's Kis-Küküllő County, in the Dicsőszentmárton subdivision. In the aftermath of World War I, the Union of Transylvania with Romania was declared in December 1918. At the start of the Hungarian–Romanian War of 1918–1919, the villages passed under Romanian administration. After the Treaty of Trianon of 1920, they became part of the Kingdom of Romania.

== Demographics ==
At the 2002 census, Bazna had a population of 3,911; of those, 86.6% were Romanian Orthodox, 4% Greek-Catholic, 3.6% Pentecostal, 2.2% Reformed, 1.4% Baptist, and 0.9% Lutheran. At the 2011 census, the commune had 3,792 inhabitants, of which 66.7% were ethnic Romanians, 29.7% Roma, 2.6% Hungarians, and 0.8% Germans. At the 2021 census, Bazna had a population of 3,329; of those, 76.84% were Romanians and 10.96% Roma.

== Villages ==
=== Bazna ===
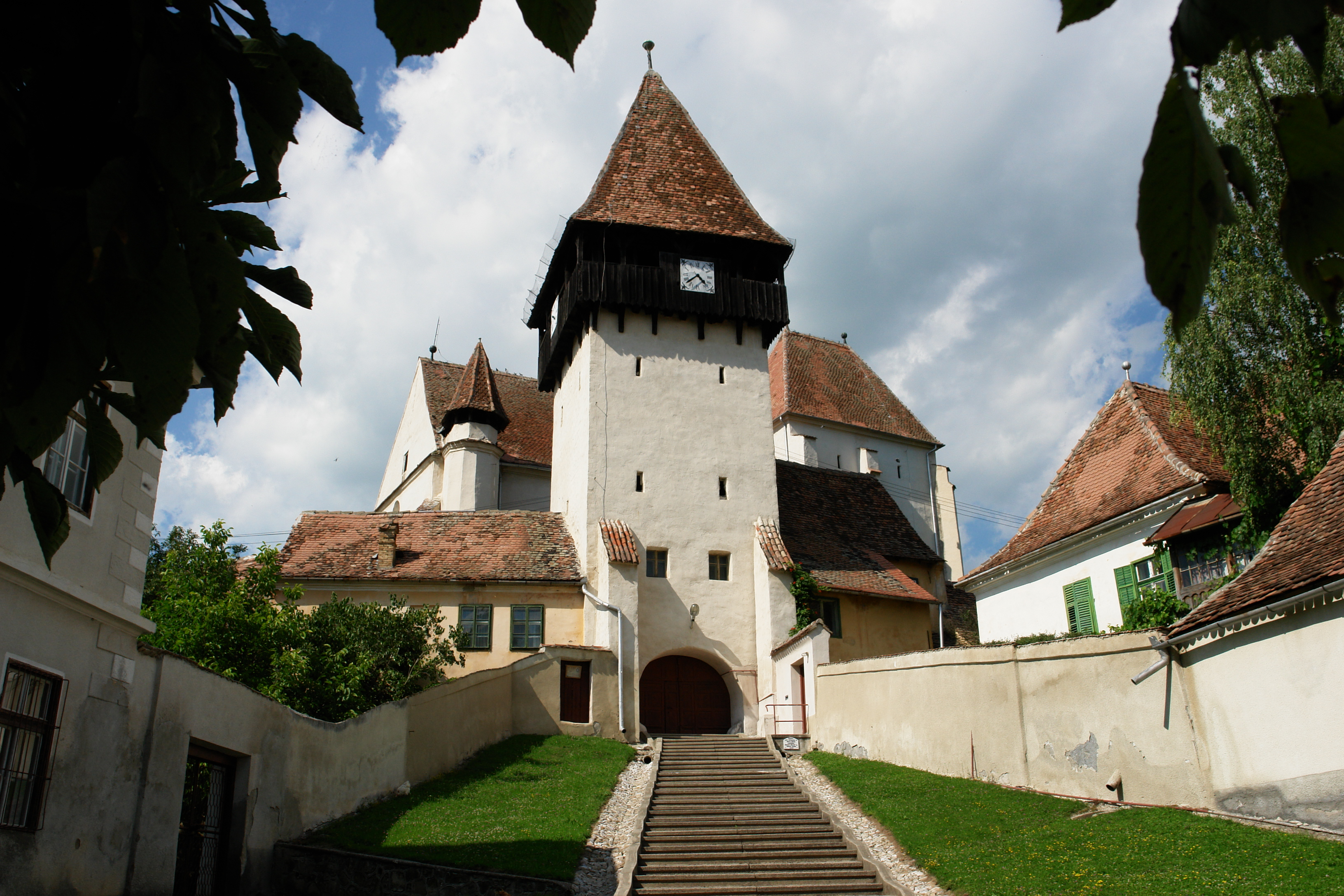
Fortified church of Bazna

Bazna village is first attested in a document of 1302. Initially, Saxons had settled to the west, near Boian, but due to the scenic aspect of Bazna valley, moved there and built an imposing fortified church. The church is built in Gothic style and incorporates 13th-century Romanesque elements, with the enclosure walls dating from the 15th and 16th centuries.

When natural gas and spring water containing salt and iodine were discovered in the 18th century, they drew notice from Transylvanian scientists. Among these were the Sibiu pharmacist Georg Bette, who studied the springs after 1752. The priest Andreas Caspari left a manuscript containing his observations for the 1762-1779 period. In it, he describes a number of healing springs, with names he gave them such as "Church spring", "Beggars' spring" and "Bitter fountain". In 1808, the Austrian Empire's officials in Vienna sent a committee of doctors and chemists to Bazna in order to study the healing properties of its salt waters and climate. In 1843, four inhabitants of Mediaş founded a society aimed at building a spa in Bazna; by 1845, 637 people were being treated there. In 1905, Bazna's Lutheran parishioners took control of the spa and its operations. That year, the spa had a pharmacy and specialist doctor, and began producing salt for distribution.

=== Boian ===
Boian village is located 4 km (2.5 mi) from Bazna, along the Boian valley and surrounded by tall hills. First attested in 1309 in a document called "Teodorch de villa Boneti" as the seat of the Târnava Mică archbishop. In 1359, it was part of Kukoliensis (Târnava) comitatus in the Kingdom of Hungary, and in 1372, it is mentioned as "Boyan" and "villa Boyum". In 1395, it was part of Cetatea de Baltă district and remained there for a long time, including when the latter belonged to the voivodes of Moldavia. Around 1488, during the reign of Stephen III, King Matthias Corvinus of Hungary donated a number of villages, including Boian, as fiefs to Moldavia, a situation that lasted until the reign of Alexandru Lăpușneanu, when the princes of Transylvania decided to reclaim the villages. Today, the coat of arms of Moldavia appears in the church and on the gate tower.

=== Velț ===
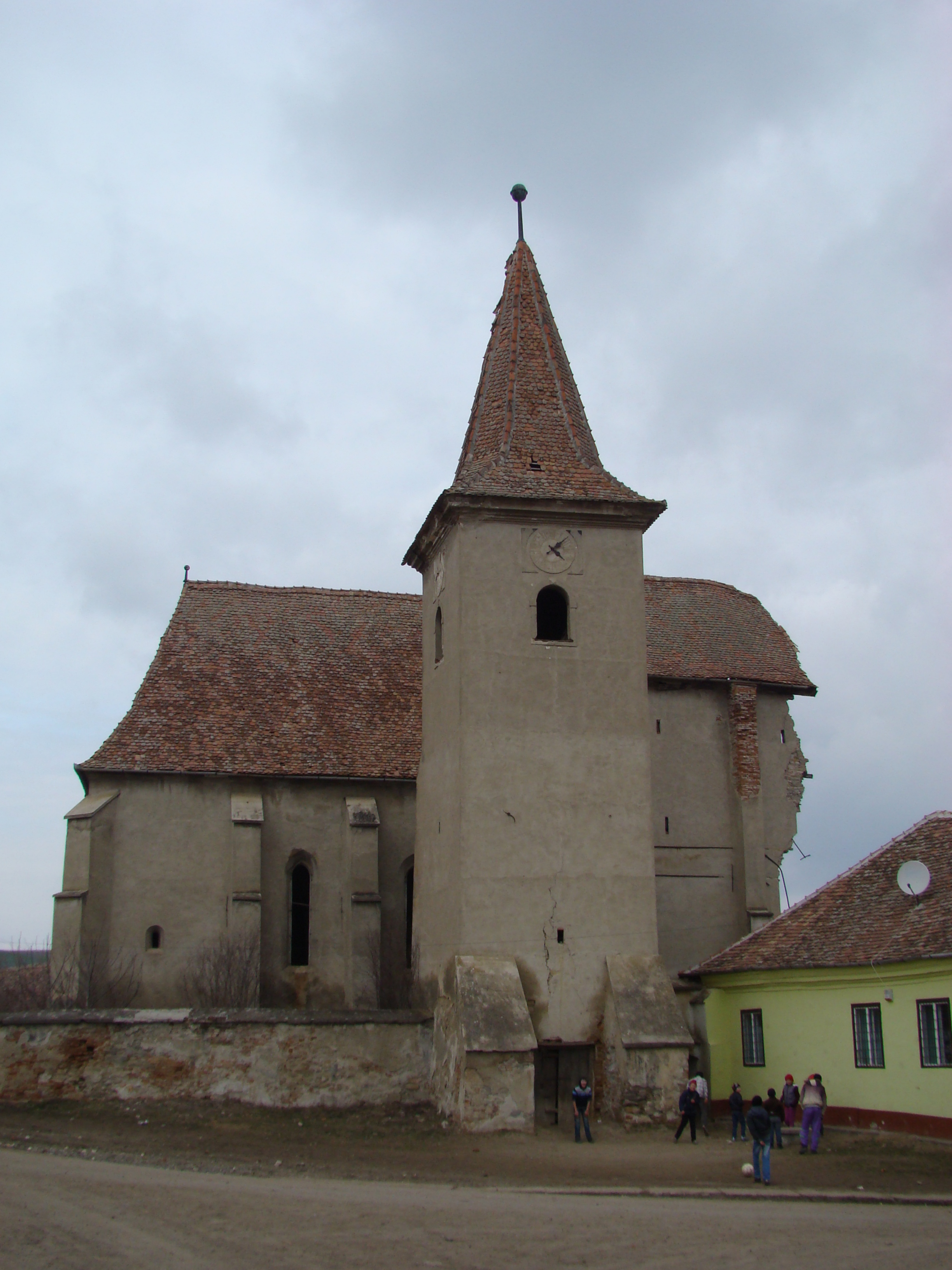
The fortified church in Velț

The name of Velț village is probably derived from the Hungarian völgy, meaning "valley". It was first mentioned in 1359 under the names of Velz and Veolcz (Völc). In 1372 it was mentioned as Weulcz; in 1861, under the Germanized name Wolzen. One of the smallest villages in the Mediaș area, it was first recognized as a small village in 1876; in 1909 it was deemed a large village. Located along the Velț valley, it is surrounded by wooded hills with a maximum height of 442 m.

In 1850 the population of the village was 992, including 568 Romanians, 368 Germans, and 54 Roma; there were 396 Greek Catholics, 368 Lutherans, and 226 Eastern Orthodox. In 1900, there were 1,112 inhabitants: 651 Romanians, 421 Germans, and 40 Hungarians; there were 500 Greek Catholics, 423 Lutherans, and 156 Eastern Orthodox. By 2002, the population had fallen to 627, including 344 Romanians, 269 Roma, and 14 Hungarians; there were 470 Eastern Orthodox, 102 Greek Catholics, and 47 Pentecostals.

== Bazna pig ==
The breed was first created in 1872 from crosses between the Mangalitsa and Berkshire pig breeds. The Bazna is primarily black with a white ring circling its trunk, starting at the shoulders and including the forelimbs. The breed was officially recognized in 1958.

== Natives ==
- Günther Enescu (born 1955), volleyball player
- Fritz Halmen (1912–2002), handball player
