= Sok Chang-suk =

North Korean archer

Sok Chang-suk (born 1 February 1963) is a North Korean archer.

== Olympics ==
She competed in the women's individual event at the 1980 Summer Olympic Games and finished seventeenth with a score of 2269 points.
