= Kyoko Yamazaki =

Japanese archer (born 1954)

Kyoko Yamazaki (山崎 京子, Yamazaki Kyōko, born 3 November 1954) represented Japan in archery.

== Career ==
She was born in Hiroshima.

Yamazaki competed at the 1976 Summer Olympic Games in the women's individual event and finished 26th with a score of 2094 points.
