= Ida Da Poian =

Italian archer (born 1946)

Ida Da Poian (born 5 May 1946) is an Italian former archer.

== Career ==
Da Poian won a bronze medal at the 1974 World Field Archery Championships and a gold medal at the European Archery Championships the same year.

She competed at the 1976 Summer Olympic Games in the women's individual event and finished nineteenth with a score of 2282 points.
