= Keto Losaberidze =

Soviet archer (1949–2022)

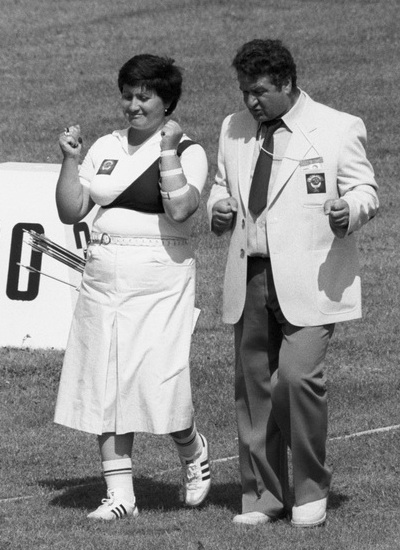
- Losaberidze (left) at the 1980 Olympics

Personal information
- Born: 1 August 1949 Tqibuli, Georgian SSR, Soviet Union
- Died: 23 January 2022 (aged 72)
- Height: 162 cm (5 ft 4 in)
- Weight: 75 kg (165 lb)

Sport
- Sport: Archery
- Club: Burevestnik Kutaisi; Burevestnik Tbilisi
Medal record
Representing the Soviet Union
Olympic Games
Gold medal – first place	1980 Moscow	Individual
World Archery Championships
Gold medal – first place	1973 Grenoble	Team
Gold medal – first place	1981 Punta Ala	Team
European Archery Championships
Gold medal – first place	1972 Walferdange	Individual
Gold medal – first place	1972 Walferdange	Team
Gold medal – first place	1978 Stoneleigh	Team
Gold medal – first place	1980 Compiègne	Team

Ketevan "Keto" Losaberidze (Georgian: ქეთევან ლოსაბერიძე, 1 August 1949 – 23 January 2022) was a Georgian archer.

== Career ==
She competed for the Soviet Union at the 1972 and 1980 Olympics and won a gold medal in 1980, becoming the only Soviet Olympic champion in archery. She placed fourth in 1972. Between 1971 and 1981 she won two world, four European and two Soviet titles. She was chosen as the Georgian sportsman of the year 1980 and placed fourth in the vote for the Georgian sportswoman of the 20th century. After retiring from competitions she worked as a professor of mathematics at the Tbilisi State University and from 2002 to 2005 headed the Georgian Archery Federation. She died on 23 January 2022, at the age of 72.
