= Archery at the Friendship Games =

Archery at the Friendship Games was held in Plzeň, Czechoslovakia between 23 and 26 August 1984. Two events were contested: men's individual (with 23 competitors) and women's individual (with 20 competitors).

Soviet Union won 5 out of 6 possible medals.

== Medal summary ==
Event	Gold		Silver		Bronze	
Men's individual	Munko Dashitsirenov (URS)	2,569	Yuri Leontiev (URS)	2,568	Kim Chong Nam (PRK)	2,533
Women's individual	Chande-Tsyren Gambozhapova (URS)	2,605	Zebiniso Rustamova (URS)	2,595	Lyudmila Arzhannikova (URS)	2,589

== Medal table ==
Rank	Nation	Gold	Silver	Bronze	Total
1	Soviet Union (URS)	2	2	1	5
2	North Korea (PRK)	0	0	1	1
Totals (2 entries)		2	2	2	6

== See also ==
- Archery at the 1984 Summer Olympics
