= Tsvetanka Stoycheva =

Bulgarian archer (born 1960)

Tsvetanka Stoycheva (Bulgarian: Цветанка Стойчева) (born 1 March 1960) is a Bulgarian archer who competed at the 1980 Summer Olympic Games.

== Career ==
She finished 27th in the women's individual event with 2144 points scored.
