= Chagdaryne Biambasuren =

Mongolian archer (born 1953)

Chagdaryne Biambasuren (born 26 January 1953) is a Mongolian archer.

== Olympics ==
At the 1980 Summer Olympic Games she took part in the women's individual event and finished 23rd with 2216 points scored.
