= Jitka Dolejší =

Czech archer (born 1958)

Jitka Dolejší (born 14 May 1958 in Prague) is a Czech former archer who competed in the 1980 Summer Olympic Games representing Czechoslovakia.

== Olympics ==
She competed in the women's individual event at the 1980 Summer Olympic Games and finished twentieth with a score of 2219 points.
