= Maria Urban =

West German archer (born 1941)

Maria Urban (born 20 December 1941) represented West Germany at the 1976 Summer Olympic Games in archery.

== Life ==
Urban was born in Bischofshofen, Austria.

She competed in the 1976 Summer Olympic Games in the women's individual event and finished eighth with a score of 2376 points.
