= Maria Szeliga =

Polish archer (born 1952)

Personal information
- Nationality: Polish
- Born: 8 November 1952 (age 73) Rzeszów, Poland

Sport
- Sport: Archery

Maria Szeliga (born 8 November 1952) is a Polish archer. She competed in the women's individual event at the 1980 Summer Olympics.
