= Margit Szobi =

Hungarian archer (born 1951)

Margit Szobi (born 21 May 1951) is a Hungarian former archer who competed in the 1980 Summer Olympic Games.

== Olympics ==
She competed in the women's individual event at the 1980 Summer Olympic Games and finished 21st with a score of 2216 points.
