= Neculai Vasilcă =

Romanian handball player (born 1955)

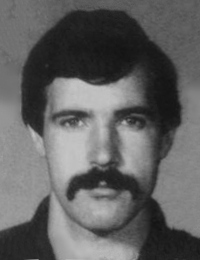

Personal information
- Born: 28 November 1955 (age 70) Bacău, Romania
- Height: 185 cm (6 ft 1 in)
- Weight: 89 kg (196 lb)

Sport
- Sport: Handball
- Club: Ştiinţa Bacău
Medal record
Representing Romania
Olympic Games
Bronze medal – third place	1980 Moscow	Team
Bronze medal – third place	1984 Los Angeles	Team

Neculai Vasilca (born 28 November 1955) is a retired Romanian handball pivot. He played 126 matches for the national team and scored 261 goals, winning bronze medals at the 1980 and 1984 Olympics. After retiring from competitions, he became a coach, managing, among others, GSV Eintracht Baunatal in Germany.
