= Adrian Cosma =

Romanian handball player (1950–1996)

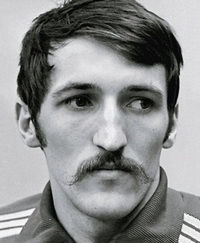

Personal information
- Born: 5 June 1950 Bucharest, Romania
- Died: 1996 (aged 45–46)
- Height: 180 cm (5 ft 11 in)
- Weight: 78 kg (172 lb)

Sport
- Sport: Handball
- Club: University of Bucharest; Dinamo Bucharest
Medal record
Representing Romania
Olympic Games
Silver medal – second place	1976 Montreal	Team
Bronze medal – third place	1972 Munich	Team
Bronze medal – third place	1980 Moscow	Team
World Championship
Gold medal – first place	1974 East Germany	Team

Adrian Cosma (5 June 1950 – 1996) was a Romanian handball player who won the world title in 1974. He competed at the 1972, 1976 and 1980 Olympics and won one silver and two bronze medals. During his career he played 130 times for the national team and scored 250 goals.
