= Terezia Preda =

Romanian archer (born 1956)

Terezia Octavia Preda (born 18 June 1956) is a Romanian archer.

== Olympics ==
At the 1980 Summer Olympic Games she took part in the women's individual event and finished 24th with 2195 points scored.
