= Nicolae Munteanu (handballer) =

Romanian handball player (born 1951)

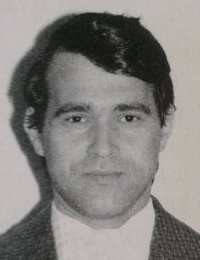
- Munteanu pictured in the 1980s

Personal information
- Born: 7 December 1951 (age 74) Braşov, Romania
- Height: 189 cm (6 ft 2 in)
- Weight: 96 kg (212 lb)

Sport
- Sport: Handball
- Club: Steaua București
Medal record
Representing Romania
Olympic Games
Silver medal – second place	1976 Montreal	Team
Bronze medal – third place	1980 Moscow	Team
Bronze medal – third place	1984 Los Angeles	Team

Nicolae Munteanu (born 7 December 1951) is a Romanian handball coach and former goalkeeper. He competed at the 1976, 1980 and 1984 Olympics and won one silver and two bronze medals; he scored one goal in 1980. At the club level he spent his entire career with Steaua București, winning with them 14 national titles. After retiring from competitions he managed French clubs US Dunkerque (1989–1990, 1991–1992) and HC Antibes (1990–1991). After 1992 he coached goalkeepers in Romania.
