= Christine Harris (archer) =

British archer (born 1956)

Christine Harris (born 14 January 1956) is a British archer who competed in the 1980 Summer Olympic Games.

== Early life ==
She was born in Shropshire, and moved to Filton in 1964. She lived on Shellmor Avenue, in Patchway, and attended Filton High School, now Abbeywood Community School.

She worked at the Midland Bank on Corn Street in Bristol.

== Olympics ==
Harris competed at the 1980 Summer Olympic Games in the women's individual event and finished 25th with a score of 2187 points.

She moved to Oswestry in October 1980.
