= Cezar Drăgăniță =

Romanian handball player (born 1954)

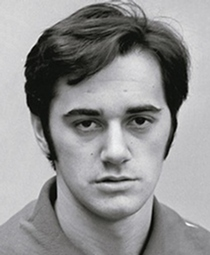

Personal information
- Born: 13 February 1954 (age 72) Arad, Romania
- Height: 188 cm (6 ft 2 in)
- Weight: 85 kg (187 lb)

Sport
- Sport: Handball
- Club: Steaua Bucharest
Medal record
Representing Romania
Olympic Games
Silver medal – second place	1976 Montreal	Team
Bronze medal – third place	1980 Moscow	Team
World Championship
Gold medal – first place	1974 East Germany	Team

Cezar Drăgăniță (born 13 February 1954) is a retired Romanian handball player. He won the world title in 1974 and two Olympic medals in 1976 and 1980. At the club level he spent most of his career with Steaua Bucharest, winning with them 15 national titles; he also participated in seven tournaments of the EHF Champions League, winning one in 1977. Near the end of his career he played and coached in Belgium and Portugal.
