= Patricia Conway (archer) =

British archer (born 1944)

Pat Conway
Personal information
- Full name: Patricia Conway
- Born: 16 January 1944 (age 81); Birmingham, England
- Height: 167 cm (5 ft 6 in)
- Weight: 44 kg (97 lb)

Sport
- Country: Great Britain
- Sport: Archery
- Club: Walsall Company of Archers

Patricia "Pat" Conway (born 16 January 1944) is a British archer. She represented Great Britain in the women's individual event at the 1976 Summer Olympics.
