= Cornel Durău =

Romanian handball player (born 1957)

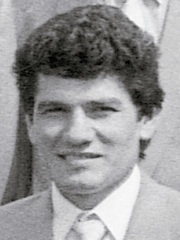

Personal information
- Born: 30 January 1957 (age 69) Bechet, Romania
- Height: 180 cm (5 ft 11 in)
- Weight: 78 kg (172 lb)

Sport
- Sport: Handball
- Club: Dinamo Bucharest (1976–88); Hidrotehnica Constanța; CB Torrevieja
Medal record
Representing Romania
Olympic Games
Bronze medal – third place	1980 Moscow	Team
Bronze medal – third place	1984 Los Angeles	Team
World Championship
Bronze medal – third place	1990 Czechoslovakia	Team

Cornel Durău (born 30 January 1957) is a retired Romanian handball player. Between 1976 and 1990 he played 200 games for the national team and scored 435 goals. He competed at the 1980 and 1984 Olympics and a three world championships, and won three bronze medals. At the club level he played for Dinamo Bucharest, Hidrotehnica Constanța and CB Torrevieja before finishing his career in Germany.
