= Aurora Chin =

Romanian archer (born 1958)

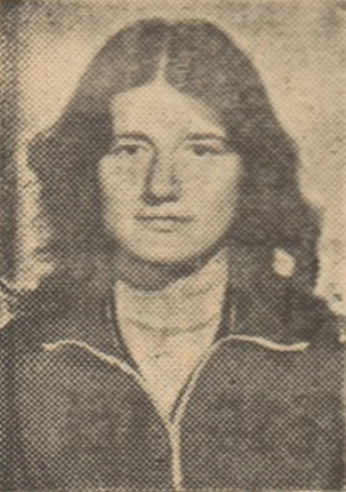
Balkan Archery Championships. Aurora Chin

Aurora Eugenia China (born 12 September 1958) is a former Romanian archer and coach.

== Career ==
Chin took up archery in 1974 and was coached by Iosif Matei. At the 1980 Summer Olympic Games Chin finished thirteenth in the women's individual event with a score of 2319 points. She became a Master of Sport in 1981.
