= Constantin Sterea (volleyball) =

Romanian volleyball player (born 1951)

Personal information
- Nationality: Romanian
- Born: 2 January 1951 (age 75); Constanţa, Romania
Honours
Men's volleyball
Representing Romania
Olympic Games
Bronze medal – third place	1980 Moscow	Team

Constantin Sterea (born 2 January 1951) is a Romanian former volleyball player who competed in the 1980 Summer Olympics in Moscow, USSR.

Sterea was born in Constanţa.

In 1980, Sterea was part of the Romanian team that won the bronze medal in the Olympic tournament. He played five matches.
