= Marian Dumitru =

Romanian handball player (born 1960)

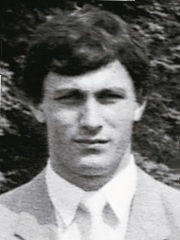

Personal information
- Born: 18 March 1960 (age 66) Ploieşti, Romania
- Height: 196 cm (6 ft 5 in)
- Weight: 95 kg (209 lb)

Sport
- Sport: Handball
- Club: Steaua București
Medal record
Representing Romania
Olympic Games
Bronze medal – third place	1980 Moscow	Team
Bronze medal – third place	1984 Los Angeles	Team
World Championship
Bronze medal – third place	1990 Czechoslovakia	Team

Marian Dumitru (born 18 March 1960) is a retired Romanian handball player. Between 1980 and 1996 he played 231 matches for the national team and scored 754 goals. He competed at the 1980, 1984 and 1992 Olympics and 1982, 1986 and 1990 world championships and won bronze medals in 1980, 1984 and 1990. At the club level he played for Steaua Bucharest, winning 11 national championships and reaching the EHF Champions League final in 1989. The same year, he signed for TEKA Santander in Spain, where he won the EHF Cup Winners' Cup in 1990. He then went to play in the Bundesliga for TSV Bayer Dormagen. In the 1993–94 season, he won the EHF Cup with Alzira Avidesa.

After retiring from competitions in 1996 he became a handball coach and worked mainly in Germany. His son, Sergiu (born 1987) plays handball in Germany.
