= Iosif Boroș =

Romanian handball player (born 1953)

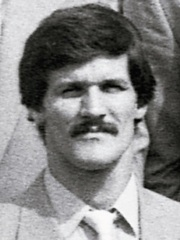

Personal information
- Born: 19 March 1953 (age 73) Săcele, Romania
- Height: 184 cm (6 ft 0 in)
- Weight: 88 kg (194 lb)

Sport
- Sport: Handball
- Club: HC Minaur Baia Mare
Medal record
Representing Romania
Olympic Games
Bronze medal – third place	1980 Moscow	Team
Bronze medal – third place	1984 Los Angeles	Team

Iosif Boroș (born 19 March 1953) is a retired Romanian handball player who won bronze medals at the 1980 and 1984 Olympics. At the club level he first played for HC Minaur Baia Mare, and in 1990 he moved to Spain.
