= Günther Enescu =

Romanian volleyball player (born 1955)

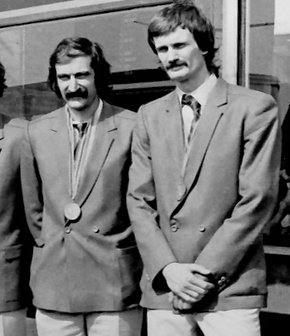
- Enescu (right)

Personal information
- Nationality: Romanian
- Born: 25 November 1955 (age 70) Bazna, Romania
- Height: 202 cm (6 ft 8 in)
- Weight: 90 kg (198 lb)

Sport
- Sport: Volleyball
- Club: Dinamo București
Medal record
Representing Romania
Olympic Games
Bronze medal – third place	1980 Moscow	Team

Günther Erich Enescu (born 25 November 1955) is a retired Romanian volleyball player who won a bronze medal at the 1980 Olympics. Günther was born on 25 November 1955, in Bazna, Romania.
