= Sorin Macavei =

Romanian volleyball player (born 1956)

Personal information
- Nationality: Romanian
- Born: 24 May 1956 (age 70); Cluj-Napoca, Romania
Medal record
Men's volleyball
Representing Romania
Olympic Games
| Bronze medal – third place | 1980 Moscow | Team |

Sorin Radu Macavei (born 24 May 1956) is a Romanian former volleyball player who competed in the 1980 Summer Olympics.

Macavei was born in Cluj-Napoca.

In 1980, Macavei was part of the Romanian team that won the bronze medal in the Olympic tournament. He played five matches.
