= Luann Ryon =

American archer (1953–2022)

Personal information
- Born: January 13, 1953 Long Beach, California, U.S.
- Died: December 27, 2022 (aged 69) Riverside, California, U.S.
- Height: 1.75 m (5 ft 9 in)
- Weight: 72 kg (159 lb)

Sport
- Sport: Archery
- Club: State Archers of California
Medal record
Women's archery
Representing the United States
Olympic Games
Gold medal – first place	1976 Montreal	Individual
World Championships
Gold medal – first place	1977 Canberra	Individual
Gold medal – first place	1977 Canberra	Team

Luann Marie Ryon (January 13, 1953 – December 27, 2022) was an American archer who won a gold medal at the 1976 Summer Olympics in Montreal, Quebec.

== Career ==
Ryon was the second American to win Olympic gold in Women's Individual Archery, after Doreen Wilber. No American woman has won an Olympic medal in the event since. Ryon also earned world archery championships in 1976, 1977, 1978, and 1982.

Ryon died on December 27, 2022, at the age of 69.

Early Life

Ryon was very athletic growing up. She liked to swim, waterski, and hike. She played basketball, volleyball, and softball in high school. Her senior year in high school she was introduced to archery. At Riverside City College, students were required to take physical education courses. Ryon planned on taking tennis, but the classes were full, so she took archery. She finished second at the collegiate nationals. Her final year of college she met John Williams, the 1972 Olympic Gold Medalist, and he became her coach.
