= Rachel Fenwick =

British archer (born 1935)

Personal information
- National team: United Kingdom
- Born: 25 October 1935 (age 90)

Sport
- Country: United Kingdom
- Sport: Archery
- Event: Individual
- Club: Wellington Bowmen

Achievements and titles
- Olympic finals: 1976 Summer Olympics (23rd)
- Updated on 7 March 2017

Rachel Fenwick (born 25 October 1935) is a British archer who competed for Great Britain at the 1976 Summer Olympics in Montreal. She finished 23rd in the individual event.

She continued to compete afterwards and became British Champion. She also appeared in the Guinness Book of records when she broke 6 British records in Brussels.

In October 2001, she co-founded the Wellington Bowmen archery club.
