= Nicu Stoian =

Romanian volleyball player (born 1957)

Medal record

Men's volleyball

Representing Romania

Olympic Games
| Bronze medal – third place | 1980 Moscow | Team |

Nicolae "Nicu" Stoian (born 17 February 1957) is a Romanian former volleyball player who competed in the 1980 Summer Olympics.

Stoian was born in Râmnicu Sărat.

In 1980, Stoian was part of the Romanian team that won the bronze medal in the Olympic tournament. He played all six matches.
