= Nicolae Pop =

Romanian volleyball player (born 1951)

Medal record

Men's volleyball

Representing Romania

Olympic Games
| Bronze medal – third place | 1980 Moscow | Team |

Nicolae Vasile Pop (born 3 January 1951) is a Romanian former volleyball player who competed in the 1980 Summer Olympics.

Pop was born in Hodac.

In 1980, Pop was part of the Romanian team that won the bronze medal in the Olympic tournament. He played all six matches.
