= Maureen Adams =

Australian archer (1937–2017)

Personal information
- Nationality: Australian
- Born: 27 August 1937
- Died: 15 December 2017 (aged 80)
- Height: 1.69 m (5 ft 7 in)
- Weight: 68 kg (150 lb)

Sport
- Sport: Archery

Maureen Adams (27 August 1937 – 15 December 2017) was an Australian archer. She competed in the 1976 Summer Olympics.
