= Marius Căta-Chițiga =

Romanian volleyball player (born 1960)

Marius Căta-Chiţiga
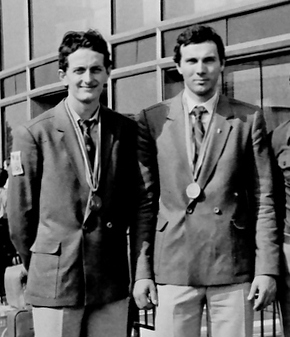
- Căta-Chițiga (left)

Personal information
- Nationality: Romanian
- Born: 13 February 1960 (age 66) Timișoara, Romania
- Height: 196 cm (6 ft 5 in)
- Weight: 85 kg (187 lb)

Sport
- Sport: Volleyball
- Club: Poli Timișoara (1975–77); Dinamo București (1977–1992); Panellinios Atena (1992–94); Rapid Bucuresti (1994–96)
Medal record
Representing Romania
Olympic Games
Bronze medal – third place	1980 Moscow	Team

Marius Căta-Chiţiga (born 13 February 1960) is a retired Romanian volleyball player who won a bronze medal at the 1980 Summer Olympics.

Căta-Chițiga started playing volleyball in 1972 at the Sports School in Timișoara and in 1974 won a national junior title. In 1975, he moved to Poli Timișoara and in 1977 to Dinamo București. With Dinamo he won the 1979 CEV Cup and the CEV Champions League in 1981 and ten national titles. Between 1992 and 1994, he played in Greece for Panellinios Athens, and after returning to Romania competed for Rapid Bucuresti. He retired after the 1996 season to become a volleyball coach and official.
