= Alexandru Fölker =

Romanian handball player (born 1956)

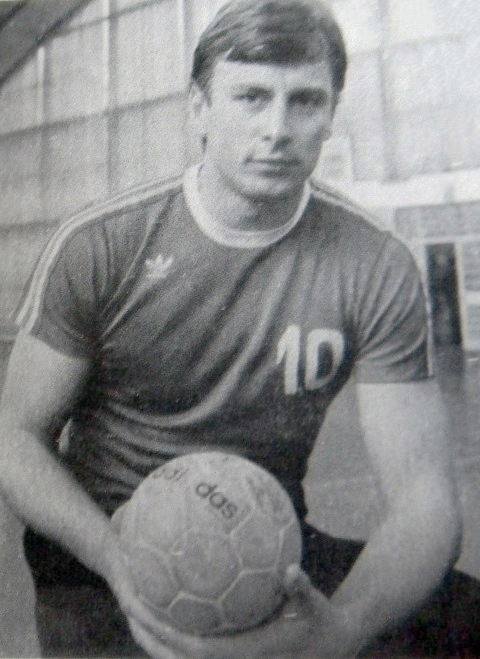

Personal information
- Born: 28 January 1956 (age 70) Orşova, Romania
- Height: 195 cm (6 ft 5 in)
- Weight: 99 kg (218 lb)

Sport
- Sport: Handball
- Club: Politehnica Timişoara
Medal record
Representing Romania
Olympic Games
Silver medal – second place	1976 Montreal	Team
Bronze medal – third place	1980 Moscow	Team
Bronze medal – third place	1984 Los Angeles	Team

Alexandru Fölker (German: Alexander Fölker, born 28 January 1956) is a retired Romanian handball player. He competed at the 1976, 1980 and 1984 Olympics and won one silver and two bronze medals. In 1989 he immigrated to Germany, where he managed the Bundesliga team MT Melsungen.
