= Carole Toy =

Australian archer (1948–2014)

Carole Mary Toy (18 July 1948 – 22 November 2014) was an Australian archer. She competed at two Olympic Games, in 1976 and 1980.

She finished third in the 1979 World Target Championships, held in Berlin.
