= Dan Gîrleanu =

Romanian volleyball player

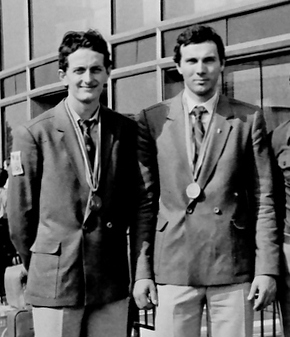
- Dan Gîrleanu (right, with Marius Căta-Chițiga)

Personal information
- Nationality: Romanian
- Born: 2 June 1954 (age 72) Oradea, Romania
- Height: 196 cm (6 ft 5 in)
- Weight: 89 kg (196 lb)

Sport
- Sport: Volleyball
- Club: Dinamo București (1977–1987)
Medal record
Representing Romania
Olympic Games
Bronze medal – third place	1980 Moscow	Team

Dan Gîrleanu (born 2 June 1954) is a retired Romanian volleyball player who won a bronze medal at the 1980 Summer Olympics. At the club level, he played for Dinamo București, winning the 1979 CEV Cup, the 1981 CEV Champions League, and seven national titles.

== Personal life ==
Gîrleanu graduated in physical education from West University of Timișoara, in law from University of Bucharest, and in political sciences from Saint Leo University in Florida, U.S. After retiring from competitions, he worked as a coach for CS Electra București from 1988 to 1992. He was appointed as a federal coach from 1992 to 1994, then the secretary-general of the Romanian Volleyball Federation between 1994 and 1996. From 1996 to 2000, he coached at Saint Leo University, and from 2000 to 2008 lectured in social sciences and physical education at University of Tampa and University of Houston. Between 2008 and 2010, he was the technical director of the FIVB Regional Development Center in Barbados. Between 2011 and 2013, he returned to Romania to become head coach of the volleyball team at CS Universitatea Cluj-Napoca. From 2014 to 2015, he was a coordinator for volleyball development in Saint Kitts and Nevis, and in 2016 came back to Romania to work as a sports consultant for children and junior volleyball at CSM București.
