= Han Sun-hi =

North Korean archer (born 1955)

Personal information
- Native name: 한순희
- Nationality: North Korean
- Born: 3 May 1955 (age 71) North Korea
- Height: 165 cm (5 ft 5 in)
- Weight: 58 kg (128 lb)

Sport
- Country: PRK
- Sport: Archery
Medal record
Asian Games
Bronze medal – third place	1978 Bangkok	Team

Han Sun-hi (born 3 May 1955) is a North Korean Olympic archer. She represented her country in the women's individual competition at the 1976 Summer Olympics. She came 10th place after both rounds, finishing with 2347 points. She won a bronze medal at the 1978 Asian Games in the women's team event.
