= Claudiu Eugen Ionescu =

Romanian handball player (born 1959)

Medal record

Men's Handball

Representing Romania

Olympic Games
Bronze medal – third place	1980 Moscow	Team

Claudiu Eugen Ionescu (born August 24, 1959 in Constanţa) is a former Romanian handball player who competed in the 1980 Summer Olympics.

Ionescu was a member of the Romanian handball team, which won the bronze medal. He played five matches as goalkeeper.
