= Carry van Gool-Floris =

Dutch archer (born 1953)

Catharina Cornelia Adriana Maria "Carry" van Gool-Floris (born 19 September 1953) is a Dutch former archer and archery coach.

== Career ==
Van Gool-Floris competed in the 1980 and 1984 Summer Olympic Games for the Netherlands. She finished sixth and 23rd in the women's individual event.
