= Laurențiu Dumănoiu =

Romanian volleyball player (1951–2014)

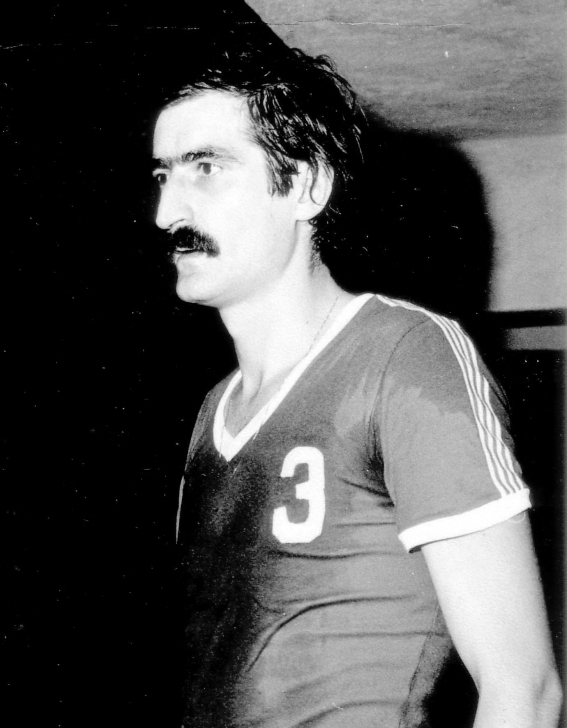

Personal information
- Born: 23 June 1951 (age 75) Râmnicu Vâlcea, Romania
- Died: 21 October 2014 (aged 63) Sibiu, Romania
- Height: 194 cm (6 ft 4 in)
- Weight: 84 kg (185 lb)

Sport
- Sport: Volleyball
- Club: Dinamo București
Medal record
Representing Romania
Olympic Games
Bronze medal – third place	1980 Moscow	Team
European Championships
Bronze medal – third place	1971 Italy	Team
Bronze medal – third place	1977 Finland	Team

Laurenţiu Dumănoiu (23 June 1951 – 21 October 2014) was a Romanian volleyball player. He won bronze medals at the 1971 and 1977 European championships and 1980 Olympics, placing fifth in 1972. At the club level he played for Dinamo București and won with them the CEV Cup in 1979 and seven national titles.
