= Linda Myers (archer) =

American archer (born 1947)

Medal record

Women's Archery

Representing United States

World Championships
| Gold medal – first place | 1973 Grenoble | Individual |
| Silver medal – second place | 1973 Grenoble | Team |
| Bronze medal – third place | 1975 Interlaken | Team |

Linda Ann Myers (born June 19, 1947) is a former World Champion archer who represented the United States.

== Career ==
Myers was born in York, Pennsylvania, and was selected to represent the United States at the 1972 and 1976 Olympics, where she finished 5th and 7th respectively. She became the World Champion at the 1973 World Archery Championships in Grenoble, also achieving a team silver medal.
