= Maricel Voinea =

Romanian handball player (born 1959)

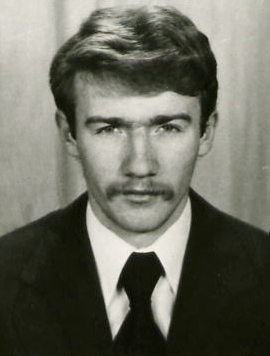
- Voinea pictured in the 1980s

Personal information
- Born: 17 March 1959 (age 67) Galaţi, Romania
- Height: 189 cm (6 ft 2 in)
- Weight: 82 kg (181 lb)

Sport
- Sport: Handball
- Club: HC Minaur Baia Mare (1977–1989); CB Alzira (1989–1992); SG Leutershausen (1992–1994); HSG Nordhorn (1994–1998)
Medal record
Representing Romania
Olympic Games
Bronze medal – third place	1980 Moscow	Team
Bronze medal – third place	1984 Los Angeles	Team
World Championships
Bronze medal – third place	1990 Czechoslovakia	Team

Maricel Voinea (born 17 March 1959) is a retired Romanian team handball player and coach. He played 263 matches for the national team, scoring 706 goals and winning bronze medals at the 1980 and 1984 Olympics and 1990 World Championships. At the club level he was part of HC Minaur in Baia Mare (1977–1989), winning the EHF Cup in 1985 and 1988. He later joined the Spanish club Avidesa Valencia (1989–1992), and eventually moved on to Germany, where he competed for SG Leutershausen (1992–1994) and HSG Nordhorn (1994–1998).

In 1999, Voinea was appointed head coach of HC Ibbenbüren, promoting it to the Bundesliga the following year, while continuing to play in the field. Moving on to TSV Landsberg as a coach-player, he repeated the performance in 2002. The last team coached by Maricel Voinea was the local one in Fürstenfeldbruck, near Munich, registered in the Fourth League. He subsequently retired from sport and works in Furstenfeldbruk's local administration.

Voinea is married and has a son Bogdan.
