= Erika Ulrich =

Swiss archer (born 1943)

Personal information
- Nationality: Swiss
- Born: 30 June 1943 (age 81); Switzerland
- Height: 164 cm (5 ft 5 in)
- Weight: 52 kg (115 lb)

Sport
- Country: Switzerland
- Sport: Archery

Erika Ulrich is a Swiss Olympic archer. She represented her country in the women's individual competition at the 1980 Summer Olympics. She came 18th place after both rounds, finishing with 2240 points.
