= Valter Chifu =

Romanian volleyball player (born 1953)

Medal record

Men's volleyball

Representing Romania

Olympic Games
Bronze medal – third place	1980 Moscow	Team

Valter Corneliu Chifu (born 2 September 1952) is a Romanian former volleyball player who competed in the 1980 Summer Olympics.

In 1980, Chifu was part of the Romanian team that won the bronze medal in the Olympic tournament. He played five matches.
