= Victoria Georgescu =

Romanian volleyball player (born 1956)

Personal information
- Nationality: Romanian
- Born: 2 July 1956 (age 68); Bucharest, Romania

Sport
- Sport: Volleyball

Victoria Georgescu (born 2 July 1956) is a Romanian former volleyball player. She competed in the women's tournament at the 1980 Summer Olympics.
