= Crina Georgescu =

Romanian volleyball player (born 1960)

Personal information
- Nationality: Romanian
- Born: 19 January 1960 (age 65); Galați, Romania

Sport
- Sport: Volleyball

Crina Georgescu (born 19 January 1960) is a Romanian volleyball player. She competed in the women's tournament at the 1980 Summer Olympics.
