= Mariana Ionescu (volleyball) =

Romanian volleyball player (born 1949)

Personal information
- Nationality: Romanian
- Born: 9 December 1949 (age 75); Bucharest, Romania

Sport
- Sport: Volleyball

Mariana Ionescu (born 9 December 1949) is a Romanian volleyball player. She competed in the women's tournament at the 1980 Summer Olympics.
