= Zebiniso Rustamova =

Soviet archer (born 1955)

Medal record

Women's Archery

Representing Soviet Union

Olympic Games
Bronze medal – third place	1976 Montreal	Individual

Friendship Games
Silver medal – second place	1984 Czechoslovakia	Individual

Zebiniso Sanginovna Rustamova (born 29 January 1955 in Dushanbe, Tajik SSR, Soviet Union) is an archer from the Soviet Union.

== Career ==
She competed for the Soviet Union in the 1976 Summer Olympics held in Montreal, Canada in the individual event where she finished in third place. She won a world championship in 1975 with a record.

She currently coaches young sportsmen and helps old people and indigent families in northern Tajikistan.
