= Gabriela Coman =

Romanian volleyball player (born 1959)

Personal information
- Nationality: Romanian
- Born: 12 April 1959 (age 65); Iași, Romania

Sport
- Sport: Volleyball

Gabriela Coman (born 12 April 1959) is a Romanian volleyball player. She competed in the women's tournament at the 1980 Summer Olympics.
