= Victoria Banciu =

Romanian volleyball player (1952–2001)

Personal information
- Nationality: Romanian
- Born: 20 August 1952; Bucharest, Romania
- Died: 2001 (aged 48–49)

Sport
- Sport: Volleyball

Victoria Banciu (20 August 1952 – 2001) was a Romanian volleyball player. She competed in the women's tournament at the 1980 Summer Olympics.
