= Archery at the 1976 Summer Olympics =

Archery at the Games of the XXI Olympiad
- Venue: Olympic Archery Field, Joliette
- Dates: 27–30 July 1976
- No. of events: 2 (1 men, 1 women)
- Competitors: 64 from 24 nations

At the 1976 Summer Olympics two archery events were contested. It was the second iteration of the modern archery competition in the Olympics, following the same format as in the 1972 Summer Olympics. The two events were men's individual and women's individual, and the competition in each event consisted of a double FITA round. Archers shot a total of 288 arrows at 4 different distances (90, 70, 50, and 30 meters for men; 70, 60, 50, and 30 metres for women).

== Medal summary ==
The United States repeated its sweep of the two gold medals. Japan and Italy claimed their first archery medals in the men's competition. The Soviet Union took the silver and bronze medals in the women's competition, adding to the bronze they had earned four years earlier.

=== Events ===
Event	Gold	Silver	Bronze
Men's individual	Darrell Pace; United States	Hiroshi Michinaga; Japan	Giancarlo Ferrari; Italy
Women's individual	Luann Ryon; United States	Valentina Kovpan; Soviet Union	Zebiniso Rustamova; Soviet Union

=== Medal table ===
Rank	Nation	Gold	Silver	Bronze	Total
1	United States	2	0	0	2
2	Soviet Union	0	1	1	2
3	Japan	0	1	0	1
4	Italy	0	0	1	1
Totals (4 entries)		2	2	2	6

== Participating nations ==
Nation	Men's Individual	Women's Individual	Total
Australia	2	2	4
Austria	1	0	1
Belgium	2	0	2
Canada	2	2	4
Costa Rica	2	0	2
Denmark	1	0	1
Finland	2	0	2
France	1	1	2
Great Britain	2	2	4
Indonesia	1	1	2
Ireland	1	0	1
Italy	2	2	4
Japan	2	2	4
Mongolia	2	2	4
North Korea	0	2	2
Norway	1	0	1
Poland	2	2	4
Puerto Rico	1	1	2
Soviet Union	1	2	3
Sweden	2	2	4
Thailand	2	1	3
United States	2	2	4
West Germany	2	1	3
Yugoslavia	1	0	1
Total athletes	37	27	64
Total NOCs	23	16	24
