= Corina Crivăț =

Romanian volleyball player (born 1958)

Personal information
- Nationality: Romanian
- Born: 24 September 1958 (age 66); Bucharest, Romania

Sport
- Sport: Volleyball

Corina Crivăț (born 24 September 1958) is a Romanian volleyball player. She competed in the women's tournament at the 1980 Summer Olympics.
