= Lucian Vasilache =

Romanian handball player (born 1954)

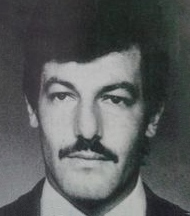

Personal information
- Born: 4 December 1954 (age 71) Podu Turcului, Romania
- Height: 196 cm (6 ft 5 in)
- Weight: 100 kg (220 lb)

Sport
- Sport: Handball
- Club: Ştiinţa Bacău
Medal record
Representing Romania
Olympic Games
| Bronze medal – third place | 1980 Moscow | Team |

Lucian Vasilache (born 4 December 1954) is a retired Romanian handball pivot who won a bronze medal at the 1980 Olympics. He played five matches and scored eight goals.
