= Doina Săvoiu =

Romanian volleyball player (born 1955)

Personal information
- Nationality: Romanian
- Born: 6 September 1955 (age 69)

Sport
- Sport: Volleyball

Doina Săvoiu (born 6 September 1955) is a Romanian volleyball player. She competed in the women's tournament at the 1980 Summer Olympics.
