= Ioana Liteanu =

Romanian volleyball player (born 1963)

Personal information
- Nationality: Romanian
- Born: 1 February 1963 (age 62); Râmnicu Vâlcea, Romania

Sport
- Sport: Volleyball

Ioana Liteanu (born 1 February 1963) is a Romanian volleyball player. She competed in the women's tournament at the 1980 Summer Olympics.
