= Jadwiga Szoszler-Wilejto =

Polish archer (born 1949)

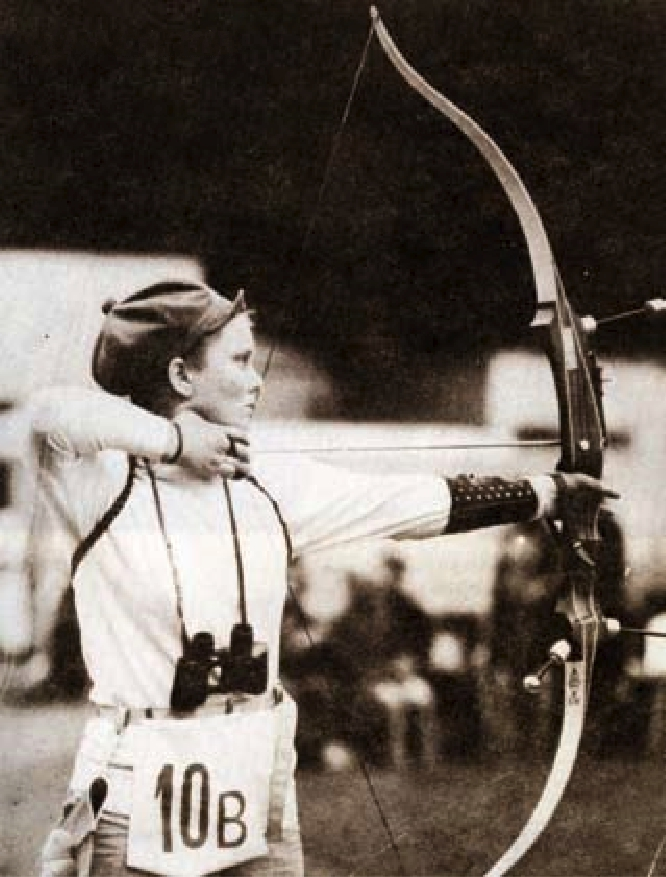

Personal information
- Born: 22 January 1949 (age 77) Rzeszówek, Poland

Sport
- Sport: Archery
Medal record
Women's Archery
Representing Poland
World Archery Championships
Silver medal – second place	Canberra 2007	Women's Individual Recurve

Jadwiga Szoszler-Wilejto (born 22 January 1949) is a former Polish female Archer. She represented Poland at the Olympics on three occasions (1972, 1976 and in 1980).
