= Elena Piron =

Romanian volleyball player (born 1960)

Personal information
- Nationality: Romanian
- Born: 21 March 1960 (age 65)

Sport
- Sport: Volleyball

Elena Piron (born 21 March 1960) is a Romanian volleyball player. She competed in the women's tournament at the 1980 Summer Olympics.
