= Olympic Archery Field, Joliette =

Sports venue in Joliette, Quebec

The Olympic Archery Field, Joliette was a field located in Joliette, Quebec. Approved in 1974 by the International Archery Federation (FITA) for use, it hosted the archery competitions for the 1976 Summer Olympics.

The site is still in use today. It is run by the Club de Tir à l'Arc de Joliette. The address of the site is: 1505 Boulevard Base-de-Roc, Joliette QC.
