= Iuliana Enescu =

Romanian volleyball player (born 1955)

Personal information
- Nationality: Romanian
- Born: 10 October 1955 (age 69); Târgu Mureș, Romania

Sport
- Sport: Volleyball

Iuliana Enescu (born 10 October 1955) is a Romanian volleyball player. She competed in the women's tournament at the 1980 Summer Olympics.
