= Valentina Kovpan =

Soviet archer (1950–2006)

Medal record

Women's Archery

Representing Soviet Union

Olympic Games
Silver medal – second place	1976 Montreal	Individual

Valentina Ivanovna Kovpan (28 February 1950, Petroostriv, Kirovohrad Oblast, Ukrainian SSR – 12 May 2006, Lviv, Ukraine) was an archer from the Soviet Union.

She competed for the Soviet Union in the 1976 Summer Olympics held in Montreal, Quebec, Canada in the individual event where she finished in second place.
