= Wrestling at the 1980 Summer Olympics – Men's Greco-Roman 52 kg =

Men's Greco-Roman 52 kg at the Games of the XXII Olympiad
- Venue: Central Sports Club of the Army
- Dates: 21–23 July 1980
- Competitors: 10 from 10 nations

Medalists
1st place, gold medalist(s)		Vakhtang Blagidze	Soviet Union
2nd place, silver medalist(s)		Lajos Rácz	Hungary
3rd place, bronze medalist(s)		Mladen Mladenov	Bulgaria

The Men's Greco-Roman 52 kg at the 1980 Summer Olympics as part of the wrestling program were held at the Athletics Fieldhouse, Central Sports Club of the Army.

== Medalists ==
Gold	Vakhtang Blagidze; Soviet Union
Silver	Lajos Rácz; Hungary
Bronze	Mladen Mladenov; Bulgaria

== Tournament results ==
The competition used a form of negative points tournament, with negative points given for any result short of a fall. Accumulation of 6 negative points eliminated the loser wrestler. When only three wrestlers remain, a special final round is used to determine the order of the medals.

Legend

- TF — Won by Fall
- IN — Won by Opponent Injury
- DQ — Won by Passivity
- D1 — Won by Passivity, the winner is passive too
- D2 — Both wrestlers lost by Passivity
- FF — Won by Forfeit
- DNA — Did not appear
- TPP — Total penalty points
- MPP — Match penalty points

Penalties

- 0 — Won by Fall, Technical Superiority, Passivity, Injury and Forfeit
- 0.5 — Won by Points, 8-11 points difference
- 1 — Won by Points, 1-7 points difference
- 2 — Won by Passivity, the winner is passive too
- 3 — Lost by Points, 1-7 points difference
- 3.5 — Lost by Points, 8-11 points difference
- 4 — Lost by Fall, Technical Superiority, Passivity, Injury and Forfeit

=== Round 1 ===
TPP	MPP		Score		MPP	TPP
4	4	Taisto Halonen (FIN)	TF / 5:21	Vakhtang Blagidze (URS)	0	0
0	0	Mladen Mladenov (BUL)	TF / 8:28	Haralambos Holidis (GRE)	4	4
4	4	Abdulnasser El-Oulabi (SYR)	DQ / 6:49	Antonín Jelínek (TCH)	0	0
3	3	Stanisław Wróblewski (POL)	6 - 7	Nicu Gingă (ROU)	1	1
4	4	Hazim Abdulridha (IRQ)	DQ / 5:29	Lajos Rácz (HUN)	0	0

=== Round 2 ===
TPP	MPP		Score		MPP	TPP
7	3	Taisto Halonen (FIN)	3 - 4	Mladen Mladenov (BUL)	1	1
0	0	Vakhtang Blagidze (URS)	TF / 2:43	Haralambos Holidis (GRE)	4	8
8	4	Abdulnasser El-Oulabi (SYR)	6 - 19	Stanisław Wróblewski (POL)	0	3
0	0	Antonín Jelínek (TCH)	DQ / 7:30	Hazim Abdulridha (IRQ)	4	8
5	4	Nicu Gingă (ROU)	D2 / 7:44	Lajos Rácz (HUN)	4	4

=== Round 3 ===
TPP	MPP		Score		MPP	TPP
1	1	Vakhtang Blagidze (URS)	7 - 2	Mladen Mladenov (BUL)	3	4
4	4	Antonín Jelínek (TCH)	DQ / 7:57	Nicu Gingă (ROU)	0	5
7	4	Stanisław Wróblewski (POL)	DQ / 7:30	Lajos Rácz (HUN)	0	4

=== Round 4 ===
TPP	MPP		Score		MPP	TPP
1	0	Vakhtang Blagidze (URS)	TF / 3:57	Antonín Jelínek (TCH)	4	8
5	1	Mladen Mladenov (BUL)	5 - 2	Nicu Gingă (ROU)	3	8
4		Lajos Rácz (HUN)		Bye		

=== Final ===
Results from the preliminary round are carried forward into the final (shown in yellow).

TPP	MPP		Score		MPP	TPP
	1	Vakhtang Blagidze (URS)	7 - 2	Mladen Mladenov (BUL)	3	
	4	Lajos Rácz (HUN)	1 - 19	Vakhtang Blagidze (URS)	0	1
6	3	Mladen Mladenov (BUL)	0 - 5	Lajos Rácz (HUN)	1	5

== Final standings ==
1. Vakhtang Blagidze (URS)
2. Lajos Rácz (HUN)
3. Mladen Mladenov (BUL)
4. Nicu Gingă (ROU)
5. Antonín Jelínek (TCH)
6. Stanisław Wróblewski (POL)
7. Taisto Halonen (FIN)
8. Abdulnasser El-Oulabi (SYR)
