= Biliński =

Biliński (feminine: Bilińska) is a surname. Notable people with the surname include:

- Anna Bilińska (1854–1893), Polish painter
- Leon Biliński (1846–1923), Minister of Finance of the Republic of Poland, president of the Supreme National Committee and Galician ruler
- Kamil Biliński (born 1988), Polish footballer
- Marek Biliński (born 1953), Polish composer
- Mieczysław Biliński (1928–2014), Polish Law and Justice Party politician
- Roman Biliński (born 2004), Polish-British racing driver
- Stanko Bilinski (1909–1998), Croatian mathematician and academician
- Sylwester Biliński, drummer of Polish punk band The Analogs
- Tadeusz Biliński (1892–1960), Polish politician, member of the former Polish United Workers' Party
- Vanda Bilinski (born 1944), Swiss chess master
- Szczepan Biliński (born 1949), zoologist, embryologist and cell biologist

== See also ==
- Biliński coat of arms, a Polish Coat of Arms
