= Polish Academy of Arts and Sciences =

College in Kraków, Poland

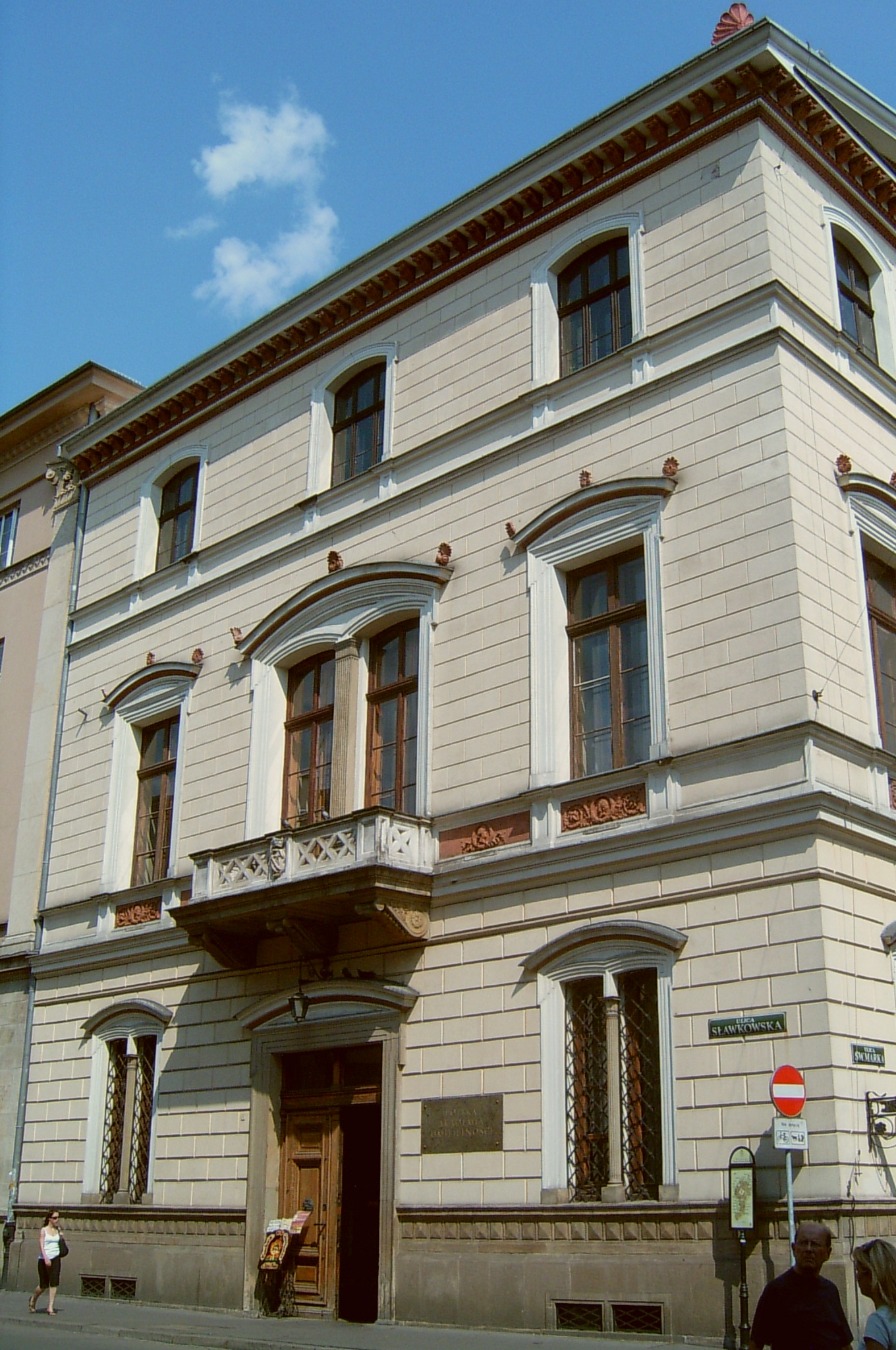
- The seat of the Polish Academy of Arts and Sciences in Kraków at 17 Sławkowska Street
- Abbreviation: PAU
- Formation: 1872; 154 years ago
- Type: national academy
- Headquarters: Kraków
- Region served: Poland
- President: Jan Ostrowski
- Website: pau.krakow.pl

The Polish Academy of Arts and Sciences or Polish Academy of Learning (Polish: Polska Akademia Umiejętności, PAU), headquartered in Kraków and founded in 1872, is one of two institutions in contemporary Poland having the nature of an academy of sciences (the other being the Polish Academy of Sciences, headquartered in Warsaw).

The Polish Academy of Arts and Sciences is co-owner of the Polish Library in Paris.

== History ==
The Academy traces its origins to Academy of Learning founded in 1871, itself a result of the transformation of the Kraków Learned Society, in existence since 1815. Though formally limited to the Austrian Partition, the Academy served from the beginning as a learned and cultural society for the entire Polish nation. Its activities extended beyond the boundaries of the Austrian Partition, gathering scholars from all of Poland, and many other countries as well. Some indication of how the Academy's influence extended beyond the boundaries of the Partitions came in 1893, when the collection of the Polish Library in Paris, the largest collection of Polish materials amassed by the Great Emigration, was transferred to the ownership of the Academy, and a branch was founded in Paris, though this latter step had been preceded by the establishment of the Rome Expedition (annual trips to Roman archives).

After World War I, the Academy was renamed "Polish Academy of Arts and Sciences" (PAU), and became the official representative of Polish learning, which entailed its participation in works of international learned organizations. Among other things, the PAU was a founder member of the Union Académique Internationale (UAI). The period between the world wars was the time of greatest activity at the PAU, especially in the sphere of publications: over 100 publication series were then in print, among them the monumental Polish Biographical Dictionary (Polski Słownik Biograficzny). It was also in this period that the Scientific Station in Rome replaced the Rome Expedition.

The PAU was initially organized into four sections:

- Philological
- Historical-Philosophical
- Mathematical-Natural Sciences
- Medical (from 1930)

In 1942 a successor body of the Polish Academy of Learning, the Polish Institute of Arts and Sciences, was established in New York City by Bronisław Malinowski, Oskar Halecki and other scholars associated with the Academy, which had been forcibly closed down by the occupying Germans. Following the collapse of communism in Poland, the Polish Academy of Learning was revived and became affiliated with the Polish Institute of Arts and Sciences of America (as the latter had meanwhile been renamed).

After the German Occupation, the PAU continued its activities in the same fields until 1952, when the authorities decided to take over its agencies and assets on behalf of the Polish Academy of Sciences in Warsaw, which was then being established. The PAU was never formally dissolved, however, and after two unsuccessful attempts at its reactivation in the years 1956–57 and 1980–81, it was finally able to resume activities in the immediate aftermath of the transformations of 1989.

=== Presidents of the PAU ===
1. Józef Majer (1872–90)
2. Stanisław Tarnowski (1890–1917)
3. Kazimierz Morawski (1917–25)
4. Jan Michał Rozwadowski (1925–29)
5. Kazimierz Kostanecki (1929–34)
6. Stanisław Wróblewski (1934–38)
7. Stanisław Kutrzeba (1939–46)
8. Kazimierz Nitsch (1946–57)
9. Adam Krzyżanowski (1957–58)
10. Gerard Labuda (1989–94)
11. Kazimierz Kowalski (zoologist) (1994–2001)
12. Andrzej Białas (2001–2018)
13. Jan Ostrowski (since 2018)

=== Secretaries general of the PAU ===
1. Józef Szujski (1872–83)
2. Stanisław Tarnowski (1883–90)
3. Stanisław Smolka (1890–1903)
4. Bolesław Ulanowski (1903–19)
5. Kazimierz Kostanecki (1919–21)
6. Stanisław Wróblewski (1921–26)
7. Stanisław Kutrzeba (1926–39)
8. Tadeusz Jan Kowalski (1939–48)
9. Jan Dąbrowski (historian) (1948–57)
10. Adam Vetulani (1957–58)
11. Józef Skąpski (1989–94)
12. Jerzy Wyrozumski (1994–2015)
13. Szczepan Biliński (from 2015)

=== Honorary members ===
Among the honorary members of the PAU were:

- John Paul II
- Jan Nowak-Jeziorański
- Władysław Bartoszewski
- Franciszek Macharski

== Structure of the PAU ==
At present, the Academy is organized into six distinct sections (Classes), consisting of multiple dedicated and interdisciplinary commissions and committees.

=== Philology ===
This section brings together scholars who represent philologies (Polish, Classical, English, Germanic, Romance, Slavic), including linguistics and literary studies (literary history and theory), as well as art historians.

The primary fruits of the section's labors are its publications, presently consisting of three series: Papers in Philology, Library of Translations from Ancient Literature (including eight volumes published before World War II), and Old Polish Source Materials. The first series, Papers in Philology, includes several publications, such as a study by Stanisław Urbańczyk dealing with the history of linguistics in Poland, collection of essays by the Italian Slavicist Riccardo Picchio (translated into Polish) as well as the following works: by Aleksander Szulc on national varieties of German language, by Romuald Turasiewicz on the life and artistic works of Lisias, by Magdalena Sitarz on Jewish and Polish proverbs and by Mosze Altbauer on the two-way Polish-Jewish influence in the field of language. There are now five more volumes in the classical translation series: two translated and edited by Mieczysław Brożek (Statius's Thebaid and Lucan's Bellum Civile), one translated and edited by Romuald Turasiewicz (Lysias's Speeches), one translated and edited by Michał Bednarski (Apollonius Dyscolus's Essay on Syntax) and one translated and edited by Ireneusz Ptaszek (Andocides's Speeches). In the series of source materials from the earliest history of Poland, Kazimierz Rymut and his co-authors have published a collection entitled Polish Letters from the 16th Century, in a critical edition by Marian Plezia. Some publications written by members of Class I have appeared in the publication series of Class II, such as the Latin text of Vincent Kadłubek's Chronicles, in a critical edition by Marian Plezia.

==== Commission on Classical Philology ====
The nature of the Commission's work is to bring together representatives of various humanistic disciplines who share an interest in the study of Greco-Roman antiquity, broadly conceived, and its reception in the culture of Medieval and modern Europe. It gathers Hellenists and Latinists, specialists in history and literature, as well as linguistics (classical linguistics): Byzantinists, neo-Latinists, ancient historians, historians of ancient culture and philosophy, Patristicists, archaeologists, numismatists, specialists in ancient law (especially Roman), and scholars interested in the reception of antiquity in the culture and literature of Europe, especially Poland.

The thematic scope of the Commission's activities covers virtually all areas of knowledge about antiquity.

The focus of scholarly attention has been on the study of:

- the grammar, syntax, semantics, and stylistics of the classical languages;
- the types and genres of Greek literature of the classical period, especially drama, historiography, and rhetoric;
- Roman literature of the Augustan Age.

The Commission publishes its Works, in which five volumes of assembled works on various topics have already appeared, as well as four monographs. The Commission is also actively engaged in the PAU series entitled Library of Translations from Ancient Literature, in which there have appeared so far editions of Statius's Thebais, Lucan's Bellum Civile, Lysias's Speeches and Apollonius Dyskolos's Essay on Syntax and Andocides's Speeches.

The research issues presented at this Commission's meetings involve Polish and European art, from antiquity to the most recent times. Papers read before the Commission must display both a solid methodological base and a profound exploration of the subject matter, based on a thorough review of the secondary literature. Papers are often read by scholars who do not belong to the Commission, from various universities in Poland. (Papers by invited lecturers from abroad are anticipated.) The papers presented at the Commission's meetings have earned considerable respect among young art historians. Discussions have also been organized on the organizational framework of the Polish Committee on Art History.

==== Commission on Art History ====
The majority of the papers presented are published in the Commission's scholarly yearbook, Folia Historiae Artium, series nova. Seven volumes have been published since 1995, when the new series was commenced. Volume IV was devoted to the 100th anniversary of the birth of Karolina Lanckorońska, a person of inestimable importance for Polish learning, and especially for the PAU, of which she was a member. The publication series Cracovia Artificum continues to be produced by the Commission, with source materials in the history of craftsmanship, including artistic crafts; to date three volumes have appeared, edited by Bolesław Przybyszewski.

==== Commission on Modern Philology ====
This Commission was formed in the autumn of 1998, but due to the illness of its founder and first chairman, Przemysław Mroczkowski, it could not begin activities until early 2000, under the leadership of Olga Dobijanka-Witczakowa.

The Commission's meetings bring together scholars in modern philology, with the goal of achieving integration in terms of research methodology and facilitating the exchange of experiences. The third volume of the Works of the Commission on Modern Philology has now appeared, featuring the best papers from the scholarly meetings held to date.

==== Commission on Slavonic Culture PAU ====
Attached to the PAU Class I (Philology), the Commission was formed in 2000. It is to some extent an interdisciplinary endeavor, including certain aspects of the field of interest of PAU Class II (History and Philosophy). Accordingly, the members of the Commission represent not only scholars in Slavonic philology, but also archaeologists, historians, and ethnographers. The Commission has published three volumes of its Works.

=== History and Philosophy ===
This section comprises historians, archaeologists, philosophers, lawyers, theologians, sociologists, and psychologists. The section holds monthly meetings, some of which are organized jointly with Class I.

The section is involved in studies and publications on the following topics:

- Sources for the history of the Polish Government-in-Exile: minutes of the meetings of the Council of Ministers. Eight volumes are planned; Volumes I-IV have already been published.
- History of Poland in the two decades between the world wars. A book by Janusz Pajewski on this subject has already appeared, and two more volumes are anticipated.
- The history and organization of Polish learning. This subject is treated in a broad program of publications and expositions.
- Continuation of the re-edition of Jan Długosz's History of Poland (personal grant to Marian Plezia, now held by Jerzy Wyrozumski) – completed in 2007.
- The publication of the acts of the Apostolic Nunciature in Poland, a project which is recommended by the Academy of Arts and Sciences (four large volumes were produced between 1915 and 1952), was being continued by the Polish Historical Institute in Rome, under the direction of Karolina Lanckorońska (20 volumes appeared). The PAU joined the project and now it is its only manager and executor, but the enterprise is still financed by the Lanckoroński Foundation (three volumes have appeared).
- In keeping with tradition, the Class also publishes several series of source materials for Polish history: two volumes of Monumenta Poloniae Vaticana. A new series has been added: Monumenta Sacra Polonorum (two volumes have already appeared).

The Class has organized three scholarly symposia: one devoted to the Senate of the Republic of Poland, its historical role and its present status; the second, to the anniversary of the Soviet attack on Poland on 17 September 1939; and the third, to research on the settlement of the first agricultural peoples on both sides of the Western Carpathians in the fifth millennium BC.

The Class's most significant publications include a book by Gerard Labuda, Mieszko I król Polski 1025–1034 [Mieszko I, King of Poland, 1025–1034]; a book by Piotr Hübner, Siła przeciw rozumowi. Losy Polskiej Akademii Umiejętności 1939–1989 [Force against Reason: the Fate of the Polish Academy of Arts and Sciences, 1939–1989]; Protokoły posiedzeń Władz RP na Uchodźstwie 1939–1945 [Minutes of the Meetings of the Authorities of the Republic of Poland in Exile, 1939–1945], Volumes I-IV; and Chrześcijaństwo Rusi Kijowskiej, Białorusi, Ukrainy i Rosji (X-XVII wiek) [Christianization of Kievan Ruthenia, Belarus, Ukraine, and Russia (10th–17th century)], edited by Jerzy Kłoczowski; Józef Gierowski The Polish-Lithuanian Commonwealth in the 18th century. The Class cooperates with the Jagiellonian University in publishing the periodical Kwartalnik Filozoficzny [Philosophical Quarterly].

The section is also actively engaged in realizing the agreement with the Slovak Academy of Sciences, through such joint projects as coordinating archaeological research performed by the Kraków centre on both sides of the western Carpathians; studies on Polish-Slovak relations during World War II; and the preparation of a dictionary of the Oravian local dialect. Contracts are in preparation with the Slovenian Academy of Sciences, the Institute of Ukrainian Studies at the National Academy of Sciences of Ukraine in Lviv, and the Czech Academy of Sciences.

==== Commission on Central Europe ====
This Commission was founded in 1991 on the initiative of Henryk Batowski, to assemble scholars interested in the archaeology, history, philology, and culture of the nations inhabiting Central and Eastern Europe. In 1993, the Commission on Eastern Europe was split off. Since that time, the Commission on Central Europe has covered the area between the Baltic and the Adriatic, and between the Elbe, Neman, and Bug rivers, as well as the lands on either side of the central Danube.

At present, the primary focus on the Commission's research work is on national renascence; the history of state formations (including, among other things, the former Czechoslovakia and Yugoslavia, as well as Hungary); and the political history of regions inhabited by populations of mixed ethnic, cultural, and religious backgrounds, along with their mutual relations.

The Commission's publication record is imposing. The effects of its work are reflected in the series Prace Komisji Środkowoeuropejskiej [Works of the Commission on Central Europe]." To date twelve volumes have been published.

==== Commission on Eastern Europe ====
This Commission was created in 1993, when the PAU Commission on Central Europe, founded two years earlier, was divided.

The area of interest of this Commission extends to all the countries of Eastern Europe, though at the present moment, due to the research specializations of its associate members, this means primarily Russia, Belarus, and Ukraine. The Commission attempts to include in its research activity the broadest possible spectrum of issues involving the culture of this region, both its past and the present day: from archaeology, through history, literature, religion, art, and languages, to political and sociological problems.

Learned symposia and conferences have been organized, including a conference on The Lemkos and Lemko Studies in Poland (June 1995), and five panel discussions. The Commission's publications include the Works of the Commission on Eastern Europe, of which four volumes have already appeared. Individual monographs have also been published, e.g.:

- Metropolita Andrzej Szeptycki. Studia i materiały [Metropolitan Andrzej Szeptycki: Studies and Materials], edited by Andrzej A. Zięba Kraków, 1994);
- Ryszard Łużny, Słowo o Bogu i człowieku. Myśl religijna Słowian Wschodnich doby staroruskiej [A Word about God and Man: The Religious Thought of the Eastern Slavs in the Old Ruthenian Period] (Kraków, 1995);
- Łemkowie i łemkoznawstwo w Polsce [The Lemkos and Lemko Studies in Poland], edited by Andrzej A. Zięba (Kraków, 1997).

==== Commission on the Prehistory of the Carpathians ====
This Commission was founded in 1996. It brings together scientists interested in the history of the oldest settlements in the Carpathians: primarily archaeologists, and the paleobotanists and palaeogeographers who cooperate with them.

The current primary research projects are:

- the first farmers and herders in the Carpathians: problems of the Neolithization of the Carpathians;
- adaptation of settlement from the late Neolithic and early Bronze Age to the environmental conditions of the Carpathians: the development of pastoral societies;
- settlement processes in late prehistory and protohistory, with particular emphasis on the early Middle Ages.

The Commission's works appear in the Works of the Commission on the Prehistory of the Carpathians, the first volume of which contains the results of joint Polish-Slovak research on the earliest Linear Pottery Culture in eastern Slovakia. The second volume deals with the archaeology and natural environment of the Low Beskids mountains in the Carpathians.

==== Commission on the History and Culture of the Jews ====
This Commission's activities are focused on Jewish history and culture in Poland and Europe. It brings together scholars from various specialties who share an interest in Jewish studies. In addition to regular meetings featuring lectures and discussion, the Commission also organizes scholarly symposia. The symposium entitled Jews and Judaism in Contemporary Polish Research was an occasion of particular significance, crowned by an impressive publication of symposium materials. The series entitled Works of the Commission on the History and Culture of the Jews publishes both collection of studies and monographs, as well as the materials from symposia. At present the Commission is concentrating its interests on Jewish associations, Jewish necropolises, and Jewish art. Plans call for the Commission's Bulletin to appear once every two years.

==== Commission on Law PAU ====
This Commission, reactivated in 1995, is the successor to a Commission that was an active part of the Academy prior to the year 1952. It is involved with current-day legal problems concerning the justice system (broadly understood), political reforms, the adaptation of Polish law to European norms, and the history of legal sciences in Poland. International cooperation is also being developed.

The Commission is responsible for publishing the Kwartalnik Prawa Prywatnego [Quarterly of Private Law], edited by Stefan Grzybowski, with assistance from Andrzej Mączyński. The quarterly has appeared regularly for six years, and has won recognition among specialists involved in private law. The Commission has also created a periodical publication entitled Journal of Criminal Law and Penal Sciences, which has appeared since 1997.

The Commission has regular scholarly meetings that include ample time for discussion.

==== Commission on the History of Wars and Military Science ====
Commission was formed in 2005 as the Commission for the Second World War History. In the beginning of 2006 changed its name to a current one: PAU Commission for War and Military History. Besides its monthly scientific sessions, the Commission support publication initiatives. So far the post-conference materials concerning the Polish Intelligence service activity during the Second World War has been published. Memoirs of general Antoni Szylling are to be issued soon; the colonel Mazaraki's relations about the Russo-Japanese War of 1904–1905 and a volume of the Commission's Works are being prepared.

==== Commission on Economic Sciences ====
The Commission was formed on 12 May 2004. The Commission's first aim is to create a forum for scientific discussion for the whole academic economic community, which is nowadays dispersed and divided into separate narrow specializations. One of the means for achieving this aim is the analysis of main research trends in economic sciences (both in theory and in practice), as well as the presentation of the scholarly achievements of their representatives.

Another goal of the Commission, connected with the previous project, is a discussion on the current issues of the economy of the world, of the EU and of our country, showed against the background of scientific achievements.

=== Mathematics, Physics, and Chemistry ===
The section awards the Marian Mięsowicz Prize for outstanding achievements in the field of physics. This prize is funded by the Kraków scientific institutes involved with physics; the first prize winner was Władysław Wolter in 1997.

==== Commission on Astrophysics ====
his Commission is involved with observational astronomy in the areas of optical electromagnetic radiation of radio waves, infrared, X-rays and gamma rays, detection of loaded particles, and the astronomy of neutrinos. The Commission's interests also extend into the sphere of such fields of physics as the theory of relativity, atomic and molecular optics, nuclear physics, the physics of elementary particles, and the theory of phase transitions. One of the goals of the Commission's activities is to organize conferences. The first, in June 1996, was devoted to solar astrophysics, neutron stars, and gamma flashes. The conference materials, published in English with funding from the PAU, bear the title Solar Astrophysics, Structure of Neutron Stars, Gamma Flashes.

The Commission undertakes publication initiatives, aimed at providing the Polish market with up-to-date textbooks and monographs. Work has begun on translating into Polish a modern textbook devoted to the structure of the Sun and the stars.

The Commission actively supports educational initiatives associated with astrophysics. Among such initiatives was a master's level area studies program in astrophysics at the Jagiellonian University, established in 1997.

==== Commission of Technical Sciences ====
This Commission was founded in 2003 and comprises seven sections: of Civil Engineering; of Construction, Technology and Operation of Machines; of Engineering and Technology of Ceramic Materials; of Informatics, Automatics and Robotics; of Metallurgy and Materials Engineering; of Mining and Power Engineering; of Biocybernetics and Biomedical Engineering.

=== Natural Sciences ===
The PAU's Natural Sciences section brings together representatives of the biological, agricultural, and geological sciences. The lectures at the section's meetings, typically held jointly with the PAU Mathematics Section, Physics, and Chemistry, and the Medical Section, have dealt with current interdisciplinary problems in biology and earth sciences. In addition to Polish members, the lecturers have included foreign members of the Academy, such as Andrzej Bartke (Carbondale, Illinois, USA), and Otton H. Walliser (Göttingen). The section has also taken part in organizing symposia, e.g. the National Conference on Cell Biology (1996) and the International School on the Biophysics of Membrane Transport (1997).

Particularly noteworthy is the study by Andrzej Falniowski, Ways and Byways in the Evolution of Mollusks (2001), which appeared in the section's series of Papers.

==== Commission on Agricultural, Forests, and Veterinary Sciences ====
The Commission's activities are focused on the organization of scientific symposia, whose materials are published either in the form of separate single-topic volumes or in the series of Works. Currently, the Commission has been working on the issues connected with Polish agriculture, forestry and animal breeding in Europe united in EU.

==== Commission on Quaternary Palaeogeography ====
This Commission was founded in 1979 within the Kraków branch of the Polish Academy of Sciences, but since 1993 it has been a part of the PAU. Its roots can be traced back to the Committee for Palaeological Research, founded by the PAU in 1928, and to its official publication, Palaeology, in print since 1933. The Commission integrates various disciplines involved in the study of the Quaternary Period: geologists, geomorphologists, paleontologists, archaeologists, and others. The Commission's works are published in the Folia Quaternaria. To date, volumes 64—74 have appeared under the aegis of PAU publications; these have comprised collections of papers dealing with neotectonics, Paleolithic settlement on the loess uplands of the Kraków region, paleomalacology, and dendrochronology. The Commission's meetings have heard papers on the stratigraphy of Pleistocene and Holocene sediments in the light of malacological and palynological analyses, the age of shifts, the conditions for the deposition of lake chalks, and the formation of cave dripstones.

Within the scope of the Commission's activities, Kazimierz Kowalski was pursuing a research project on Rodents of Pleistocene Europe (an individual grant from the Scientific Research Committee). The results of this research project are incorporated in volume 72 of Folia Quaternaria and was awarded the City of Kraków Prize.

==== Commission on Embryology and Morphology ====
This Commission, founded in 1996, serves to integrate research on the embryonal growth and morphology of plants and animals. The task it has established for itself is to organize annual national scientific conferences and regular meetings. The Commission is currently composed of scientists representing all the nation's leading scientific centers. To date it has organized or co-organized several national scientific conferences and meetings with single papers. The results are published in three periodicals: Acta Biologica Cracoviensia, Folia Histochemica et Cytobiologica, and Folia Morphologica.

==== Commission on Geoinformation ====
This Commission was founded in 1998. Its focus of interests, in keeping with the definition of geoinformation, is methodology of collecting, storing, analyzing, and presenting data pertaining to terrestrial time and space, using the appropriate information technology. This involves information regarding the Earth itself and the objects, phenomena, and processes encountered on and beneath the surface of the Earth. Research topics may include the physical environment and its properties, or natural and man-made resources, as well as the changes taking place in these resources. Due to the composite nature of the discipline, the Commission includes geologists, geophysicists, geodesists, photogrammetrists and experts in remote sensing, representatives of mining-related sciences, information specialists, and geographers.

The main task of the Commission is to facilitate the exchange of experiences among specialists from different disciplines involved with geoinformation, to stimulate the development of this branch of science, and to promulgate its results. The Commission's basic forms of activity include holding monthly scientific meetings, as well as organizing or co-organizing national and international scientific conferences. The results are published in the periodical Geoinformatica Polonica.

=== Medicine ===
The members of this section include physicians, pharmacists, and biologists whose scientific work is directly connected with medicine. The meetings of the section are regularly held jointly with the Mathematics and Natural Sciences sections, and have included papers on the general problems of medicine, presented both by members of the section and by foreign scientists visiting Kraków.

Two scientific symposia in the medical sciences took place in 1995 under the auspices of the Polish Academy of Arts and Sciences. One of them, organized in cooperation with the Medical Research Center of the Jagiellonian University and the Polish Physiological Association, dealt with the centennial of the discovery of adrenaline, which was made simultaneously by Polish and English researchers. The second symposium dealt with the problem of the role of infection by Helicobacter pylori in inflammations of the mucous membranes of the stomach. In this area a crucial role has been played by the research of Stanisław Konturek and Jerzy Stachura, members of our Academy who are also affiliated with the Polish Academy of Sciences.

Within the Medical section there is the PAU Commission on Medical Ethics. The members of the section also take part in the work of the PAU Commission on Threats to Civilization.

On the initiative and on behalf of the section, the Tadeusz Browicz Prize has been awarded since 1999 to recognize outstanding achievements in the field of medicine and pharmacology. Until recently the Prize was funded by the Pliva pharmaceutical company. The English Language School of Medicine at the Jagiellonian University's Collegium Medicum, previously the second sponsor, was the sole sponsor in 2001. The Tadeusz Browicz Prize is formally awarded to the winners at the June meeting of the PAU's General Assembly.

=== Artistic Creativity ===
This section was founded in 1994, after the PAU's charter was amended to allow for its creation. The goal of the new Section was to include persons from the world of art among the members of the Academy, outstanding creators whose careers have made a significant contribution to the development of culture. The areas of artistic creativity represented in the section include literature, music, architecture, painting, sculpture, theater, and film. The section's activities were inaugurated by two lectures, one delivered by Jerzy Nowosielski, "The Growth of Consciousness in Time: Truth or Illusion?" and the other by Jan Józef Szczepański, "The Concept of Morality in Literature".

The speakers at the section's meetings in recent years have also included Andrzej Wajda, Witold Cęckiewicz, Jerzy Jarocki, Stanisław Lem, Stanisław Rodziński, and Bronisław Chromy.

=== Independent Interdisciplinary Commissions ===
==== Commission on Threats to Civilization ====
This Commission is interdisciplinary in character, and is composed of members of different PAU classes, from the History and Philosophy sections to the Creative Arts section. Threats to the harmonious development of humanity should be a subject of interest and research, not only for representatives of the exact sciences and engineering, biology, and medicine, but also for historians, philosophers, lawyers, and even literary scholars and creative artists from other areas of culture. Threats are associated in the public mind with the improper use of the results of scientific research and the development of technology and industrial operations that are hostile to the natural environment. Yet there are also dangers for the future of the human race lurking in climatic changes, population growth, and the appearance of new diseases. Other threats emerge from ideologies that generate fundamentalism, mendacity, and hatred, the primary causes of terrorism and war. We should bear in mind in this context that during the century now drawing to its close humanity achieved the capability of annihilating itself.

Ethical evaluations are not applied to the results of scientific research. The criterion of scientific value as such is truth. Evil lurks in our very selves, and this is what causes the results of research to be exploited to the detriment of humanity. The multiplication of pseudo-sciences and the contradiction of rationalism are leading us into blind alleys, and for many people are replacing their lost faith in the value of scientific progress. The general public needs to be convinced that it is only through the further development of science and learning that the consequences of all these threats can be averted. Scientific truth and the love of one's neighbor are the basic principles that create the opportunity for humanity to survive and develop in harmony.

The Commission discusses the threats that have arisen, and provides society at large with accurate information about their causes and the ways to avert their consequences. The scientific meetings are used to present and discuss selected issues involved with the threats that have already emerged, are just becoming apparent, or are expected, and to indicate the directions for scientific research and actions to avert these threats. Extensive summaries of the papers are published in a PAU periodical, Zagrożenia cywilizacyjne [Threats to Civilization], which in the future will occur periodically in the form of a quarterly. In addition, the Commission intends to organize public lectures for a broad spectrum of society, and will also attempt to reach public opinion through the mass media: the press, radio, and television.

==== Commission on the History of Sciences ====
This Commission was founded in 1998 on the initiative of the Natural Sciences section. Its task is to stimulate research on the history of particular scientific disciplines, conducted by representatives of those disciplines, rather than by historians, who lack the specialized education needed to fully comprehend the substance of highly specialized disciplines. This idea fell on fertile soil, since there had already been great interest within the PAU in the history of the organization of science and in the biographies of eminent scholars and scientists from the past.

The Commission has been very active. It organizes monthly meetings with papers and discussions as well as scientific symposia. The results of the Commission's work are printed in the series Works of the Commission on the History of Science (reports presented at the Commission meetings) and in Monographs. The Commission initiated also a series devoted to the PAU and entitled Studies and Materials for the History of the Polish Academy of Arts and Sciences.

==== Commission on the Evaluation of Textbooks ====
Out of a concern for the proper intellectual level of the textbooks used in public schools, the PAU Executive Board decided in late 2000 to found a Commission composed of specialists in the various subjects taught in the secondary school curriculum, to provide completely independent evaluations of the textbooks adopted for use in public schools. The work of such a Commission ought to be of considerable social benefit. The very existence of such an independent body should help make authors and publishers more sensitive to the intellectual level of the textbooks being introduced into the public school curriculum. Satisfactorily, the forecast have proved correct. The current activities of the Commission as well as the five published volumes of its Works have aroused intense interest. Following the Commission's motion, honorary diplomas were conferred on the authors and published of the best textbooks during June General Assembly of the PAU (five times so far).

==== Commission on European Matters ====
This Commission, formed in 2003, is engaged—as its name indicates—into the issues related to European matters and especially the Poland's, and Kraków's, place and role in Europe. Several ongoing works (and mainly open sessions) have been already organised and all of them focused on various aspects of Poland's participation in European Union. The exemplary subjects listed below (lectures or introductions to discussions during the Commission's meetings) are brief but accurate summary of the most important issues: Constitution Treaty of the European Union by Edmund Wittbrodt, Europe Seeking for its Symbols. History and Meaning of the European flag by Krzysztof Kowalski, Being a European – what does it mean? by Zdzisław Mach and Piotr Sztompka, Is it worth dying for Nice? by Wojciech Słomczyński and Karol Życzkowski.

The Commission have worked on—and still is planning to do so—education and science matters (i.e. Polish studies on European Matters faculties, role of universities in today's Europe, scientific and educational policies in Poland and Europe, financing of scientific research works, various organisational aspects of scientific activities in a European scale, European scientific associations' undertakings etc.) Altogether with the Commission on the History of Science, the Commission for European Matters organised (on behalf of Polish Academy of Arts and Sciences) a conference of European Society for the History of Science that took place in Kraków in September 2006.

==== Commission for the Development of the City of Kraków ====
The Commission is composed of 20 founder members (members of the PAU and the PAN), prominent representatives of the humanities, mathematics and natural sciences, artistic disciplines, as well as 21 incorporated members who support the interdisciplinary aims of the Commission and represent such fields as town and country planning, archaeology, history of art, sociology, law, landscape architecture, botany, geography, civil engineering, water management, transport and communication.

The Commission, depending on the undertaken tasks, intends to collaborate with appropriate specialists in related disciplines of science and to make them its members, if the need arises.

==== Commission on the Philosophy of Natural Sciences ====
PAU Commission for Natural Sciences Philosophy is a discussion panel for natural science scholars as 'philosophers' taking place with participation and under sui generis control of 'real' philosophers. The Commission is a group of representatives of Philosophy, Mathematics, Physics, Astronomy, Biology, Chemistry, Geology and Medicine. Its character is an interdisciplinary though, and focused on issues of an ontology aspect as well as issues concerning mutual influence Philosophy and other, more specialized, sciences.

==== Commission of Natural Sciences and Medicine ====
Based in Wrocław.

== Contemporary activity ==
Currently, the PAU consists of six sections, each of which has its executive board, with a director, deputy director, and a secretary; in some cases, there is also a deputy secretary. Within each class there are commissions and committees, the latter standing or temporary, which, though, must be headed by a regular member of the PAU (with few exceptions), may include persons who are not PAU members.

The sections hold monthly scientific meetings, where papers are read and discussed. The PAU's activities are described and documented in the "PAU Annual". Each of the classes issues its own "Papers" or other publication series, where they publish works that fall within the scientific purview of the section or other texts of scientific or scholarly value, especially historical sources. The commissions have their own series of "Works" or periodicals, according to their respective specialties.

As of June 2009, the PAU had 476 members, including 146 regular members, 148 corresponding members and 182 foreign members, each of whom maintains active contacts with Polish science and learning.

=== Seminars of the PAU ===
Since 2002, monthly Seminars of the Polish Academy of Arts and Sciences have been organized and attracted attendance up to ca. 200 participants. Currently, the leading topic is "Patriotism yesterday and today". To the group of speakers invited to deliver their lectures belong eminent representatives of science, culture, and public life, such as Władysław Bartoszewski, Bronisław Geremek, Maciej Grabski, Jan Nowak Jeziorański, Archbishop Alfons Nossol Archbishop Józef Życiński, Archbishop Henryk Muszyński and others.

=== Science Café ===
Since 2004, the PAU has organized, together with the daily "Dziennik Polski", a series of events called the Science Café. These are scientific meetings open for public. Each of the meetings is dedicated to a lecture on a scientific subject for general public and is followed by a discussion and conversations over a cup of coffee.

=== "PAUza Akademicka" Weekly ===
An online weekly PAUza Akademicka (Academic PAUse) subsidized by the Municipality of Kraków, has been available since September 2008. On special occasions a paper version is printed. The weekly is devoted to the issues related to scientific life in Poland, with special attention paid to the scientific environment in Kraków. Andrzej Kobos PhD and Marian Nowy are the editors.

=== Supporting Young Scholars and Junior Research Workers ===
Since January 2009, the "PAUeczka Akademicka" [Academy of the Young], has been working in the PAU. Directed by vice-president of the PAU Andrzej Szczeklik, it organizes monthly meeting of PhD students, assistant lectures and students representing various scientific disciplines from the academic environment in Kraków. The meetings are devoted to discussions aiming at humanization and integration of academic circles. The PAU co-finances the Winter School of Theoretical Physics of Wrocław University (for students in senior years, PhD students, and junior research workers), international workshops, and the Kraków School of Theoretical Physics (for junior research workers from Poland and abroad).

=== The Academic Library of the PAU and PAN ===
The Academic Library of the PAU and the PAN has been in the structure of the PAU since 1 January 2000. Its origins go back to the 19th century and to the Kraków Learned Society. Until 1952 it functioned as the Library of the Academy of Arts and Sciences (since 1872) and of the Polish Academy of Arts and Sciences (since 1920), and starting from 1953 as an independent unit of the Polish Academy of Sciences. As a result of the agreement between the PAN and the PAU concluded on 20 October 1999, the Library became an institution managed by the PAU. The Library numbers ca. 660,000 volumes and inventory units, including nearly 144,250 volumes and inventory units of special collections, which comprise nearly 13,700 old prints, about 13,000 manuscripts and over 96,000 graphics and drawings. The Library exchanges publications with more than 1,000 institutions in 77 countries, publishes its "Annual" (of a volume of c.a. 50 publisher's sheets), prepares and successively issues catalogues of its collections, and is engaged in gathering and providing information, for instance on didactics in tertiary education institutions in Kraków. The Library has its own Council appointed (on a fifty-fifty basis) by the PAU and the PAN.

=== The Archives of the Science of the PAN and PAU ===
The activities of the PAU are closely connected with the Archives of the Science of the PAN and of the PAU. Besides the PAN's collection (starting from 1953) the Archives gather also files of the Kraków Learned Society and other Kraków societies, and, first of all, of the Academy of Arts and Sciences (since 1872) and the Polish Academy of Arts and Sciences (1920–1952 and from 1989). The collection contains also numerous legacies of many scholars, not only those who were the PAU members. As a consequence of the agreement between the PAN and the PAU, since 1 April 2002, the former Warsaw Branch of the Archives of the Polish Academy of Sciences has been functioning under the name of the Polish Academy of Arts and Sciences in Kraków. The Archives belong to the structure of the PAN Branch in Kraków but have their own Council appointed and financed by both the academies. Besides storing, working out the collected items and making them available for researches, the Archives systematically organize various exhibitions and scientific conferences. They also publish the PAU series entitled "In the Service of Science". The Archives work in close cooperation with the PAU's Commission on the History of Science.

=== Polish Library in Paris ===
The Polish Library in Paris has become an important PAU's department. The PAU exercised its former owner's rights (since 1893) and settled the issue by arbitration reaching an agreement with the Historical and Literary Society in Paris, the body currently managing the Library. Having agreed on the Society's co-ownership, the PAU has been co-financing (from the funds of the Ministry of Science and Higher Education) the Library and co-organizing its activities since 2004.

=== Polish Biographical Dictionary ===
The PAU collaborates with the Institute of History of the Polish Academy of Sciences in the preparation and publishing of "Polski Słownik Biograficzny [Polish Biographical Dictionary]". From 1935 until 1949, the Dictionary was published by the PAU. Then, because of ideological reasons, the publishing was discontinued. It was two years after the political breakthrough in October 1956 when the editing unit was reactivated in the structures of the PAN. Since then the Dictionary has been continuously published. Starting from 1999 the PAU has been also involved in making of the "Polish Biographical Dictionary" by rendering its rooms of a total area of 193 m^{2} available for the editorial staff.

=== Scientific Scholarships ===
The PAU controls the foreign research fellowships funded by the Lanckoroński Foundations. This involves a large number of scholarships for resident fellowships in Rome, Vienna, and London, and occasionally in other cities as well. The PAU Scholarship Commission, which also includes representatives from five Polish universities—Jagiellonian University, Warsaw University, Wrocław University, Adam Mickiewicz University in Poznań and Nicolaus Copernicus University in Toruń—awards these scholarships each year. In 2005, the Maria Zdziarska-Zaleska Scholarship Fund was set up at the Historical and Literary Society in Paris to provide money for research in the Polish library in Paris. A commission attached to the PAU awards the scholarships.

=== International Cooperation ===
Since its foundation, the Polish Academy of Arts and Sciences has been actively involved in cooperation with foreign institutions and activities on the international forum. Already in the 19th century the Academy initiated archival expeditions to study sources from the history of Poland (among other the so-called Roman Expedition to Vatican Archives connected with its opening in 1881), and sent its representatives to international congresses. In 1898, the Academy of Arts and Sciences became the owner of the Polish Library in Paris and opened a scientific station there. The Academy's library in Kraków carried on a broad exchange of publications from the very beginning. In 1921, the PAU became a founding member of the Union Académique Internationale (UAI). After its activities were resumed, the PAU's membership in the UAI was renewed in 1993, and the PAU began to take part in the research and publication projects of this organization. The publication of the Polish series of the "Corpus vasorum antiquorum" (CVA) was completed with volume 10, devoted to Cypriot pottery from the collection of the National Museum in Warsaw. The Kraków sheet in the "Tabula Imperii Romani" (TIR) was worked out and published, and the material for sheet 12 of the "Atlas du Monde Grec et Romain" was prepared. Three volumes of the Polish series in the "Corpus antiquitatum Americanensium" (CAA) have been published; the first two volumes are devoted to the ceramics and Peruvian textiles in the collection of Kraków Archaeological Museum (the Kluger Collection, formerly the property of the PAU), and the third one deals with the materials of the Polish archaeological mission in Peru. The edition of the Polish series "Sylloge Nummorum Graecorum" (SNG) has been commenced; its first four volumes are devoted to the collection of Greek coins from the Archaeological Museum in Łódź. PAU members are also participating in the realization of such UAI projects as "Corpus philosophorum medii aevi, Civitas litteraria Europaea, Moravia Magna". The PAU has declared its intention of joining new UAI projects, such as the realization of the series "Monumenta palaeographica medii aevi" (volume 1 already worked out), "Mundus Scytho-Sarmaticus et Graeco-Romanus" (together with Ukraine).

Thanks to the effective cooperation of the PAU and the UAI, the annual plenary meeting of the UAI (involving representative of 44 academies around the world assembled in the UAI) took place in Kraków in 1999, during which the PAU's representative, Janusz Kozłowski, was elected officer of the UAI; since 2007 he has been the vice-president of the organization. A cooperation agreement has been signed with the Slovak Academy of Sciences. This bore fruit especially in the field of archaeology, for instance in the realization of joint investigation of archaeological sites in eastern and south-western Slovakia as well as in the research into the archaeology and natural environment of the Low Beskids mountains (volume II). Cooperation was also initiated and contracts were signed with the Royal Flemish Academy for Science and the Arts in Belgium, with the Academy of Sciences of the Czech Republic, with the Slovenian Academy of Sciences, with the Hungarian Academy of Sciences, with the Romanian Academy of Sciences, and with the Ukrainian National Academy of Sciences. Somewhat looser forms of cooperation exist between the PAU and the Saxon Academy and Sciences, as well as the Austrian Academy of Sciences and with the Brandenburg Academy of Sciences in Berlin. Class II of the PAU has signed a cooperation agreement with the Institute of History in Vilnius. The PAU has also been engaged in scientific cooperation based on treaties negotiated by the Polish Ministry of Foreign Affairs with several countries, including France, Italy, the Czech Republic, Macedonia, and Egypt. Together with the universities in Rome (La Sapienza and LUMSA), in Lecce, in Angers, in Szeged, in Lublin (KUL), and in Tallinn, the PAU constitutes in accordance with the European Union requirements a scientific society named Centro Interuniversitario Internazionale per il Mediterraneo, l'Europa Centro-Orientale e l'Eurasia.

In 1994 the PAU Scientific Station in New York was founded, based on the Polish Institute of Arts and Sciences in America, which continued the PAU's traditions during the WWII and of the period of the compulsory suspension of the PAU activities, from 1952 until 1989. Its short-term activities could not be continued due to the lack of financial support. Currently, efforts have been made in order to revive this institution. Contacts have been established with the Polish Institute of Arts and Sciences in Canada, founded in 1943 as a branch of the Polish Institute in New York, and since 1976 operating as an independent Canadian organization. It also acquired a status of the PAU Scientific Station. Three books have been jointly published, and the PAU supports the station with their lecturers. The PAU joined the project of the Polish Historical Institute in Rome, financed by the Lanckoronski Foundation. Recently, after the death of Karolina Lanckoronska, the institute was dissolved and its property, namely numerous publications and scientific projects, such as the publications of the acts of the Apostolic Nunciate in Poland, were taken over by the PAU. Harking back to an older tradition, the PAU is also co-organizing archaeological investigations in Ukraine, continuing the excavation of a large Scythian barrow in Ryzhanovka, among other projects. These investigations have brought one of the most outstanding archaeological discoveries of recent years: the discovery of richly accoutred burial of a Scythian ruler.

Now, the works are carried out under the direction of Jan Machnik and the efforts are focused on the research into settlements located on the Dniestr River. It is possible thanks to the grants by the Committee for Scientific Research (KBN).

Returning to its pre-war intentions, the PAU has also contributed to archaeological research being conducted in Greece. These investigations deal with the sequence of layers, unique in this part of Europe, in Cave No. 1 at Klisura (eastern Peloponnese), in which traces of habitation and palaeontological finds from the period of the last Ice Age occur. This research contributes to our understanding not only of the evolution of culture in Greece, but also of climatic and paleoecological changes over the last 100,000 years. The works are being conducted under the direction of Janusz Kozłowski, under research grants. They have borne fruit in the form of the publication of the results, jointly with the Greek Academy of Sciences and the PAU.

Pursuant to the cultural cooperation treaty between Poland and Egypt, the PAU, in cooperation with the Institute of Archaeology of the Jagiellonian University, is participating in archaeological investigations in the Nile Delta.

=== Prizes ===
The PAU awards prizes for outstanding research achievements. These include the following:

- The Nicholas Copernicus Prize, funded by the City of Kraków by a resolution of the City Council passed on 9 July 1993, in conjunction with the foundation act of the Municipal Commune of 18 February 1973. By tradition, the PAU awards this Prize every year in the fields of astronomy, earth sciences, economy, natural philosophy, medicine, military defense sciences, and law. In 1995, for the first time since the revival of the PAU, six Prizes were awarded.
- The Marian Mięsowicz Prize awarded every two years for outstanding achievements in the field of physics. The Prize, funded by institutes of physics working in Kraków, was awarded for the first time in 1997.
- The Tadeusz Browicz Prize, awarded annually since 1998 for outstanding achievements in the field of medicine. To date, the prizes have been funded by the Pliva pharmaceutical company in Kraków, Novartis Poland, and the School of Medicine in English at the Jagiellonian University's Collegium Medicum.
- In June 2003, the Marian Kukieł Prize for outstanding achievements in the field of military history was awarded for the first time. Prof. Leszek Suski, Gen. Marian Kukie's copyright heir, and the PAU co-fund the prize.
- In 2008, with an effort and will of the PAU, the Erazm and Anna Jerzmanowski Prize was revived under the auspices of the Lesser Poland Voivodeship. Called "the Polish Nobel Prize", it was funded by Erazm Jerzmanowski in 1912 and secured by his inheritance. The prize was awarded within the years 1915–1938 for scientific and charitable activity. Its revival was possible thanks to the funds for Lesser Poland Voivodeship distributed by the local authorities under the leadership of Marshal Marek Nawara. The prize is supposed to be awarded annually. The first prizewinner was Ms Janina Ochojska-Okońska. She received the prize on 9 February 2009, on the centenary of Erazm Jerzmanowski's death.
- Every year, upon a motion of the Commission on the Evaluation of Textbooks, the PAU confers honorary diplomas on the authors and publishers of highest rated textbooks for intermediate schools and secondary schools.

Additionally, the PAU actively participates in awarding the following prizes:

- The City of Kraków Prize; the President of the PAU is the Chairperson of the Jury and several PAU members are the members of the Jury.
- Jan Długosz Prize of the Kraków Book Fair; the Chairperson of the Jury is a PAU member (currently Prof. Władysław Stróżewski) and three other PAU members are the members of the Jury.
- Allianz Insurance Company Prize; there are two PAU members in the Jury, including the PAU Secretary-General.

What should be additionally mentioned is the fact, that there are several societies and institutions working under the auspices of the PAU: "Wieniawa" Educational Society in Kłobuck, Society of Friends of Wodzisław, Association of the Lovers of the Village of Rogi, Society of Lovers of the Żywiec Region, Karolina Lanckorońska Group of Educational Institutions, Polish Library in Paris Intermediate School in Swiątniki Górne and Centre of Culture in Wadowice.

== Noted members ==
- Marie Curie double Nobel laureate
- Emilian Czyrniański (1824-1888), chemist, co-founder of PAU
- Michalina Stefanowska (1855-1942) biologist
- Edward Flatau (1868–1932), neurologist
- Tadeusz Banachiewicz (1882–1954), astronomer, mathematician and geodesist
- Gerard Labuda (1916–2010), medieval historian
- Kazimierz Piwarski (1903–1968), historian of Pomerania, Silesia, East Prussia
- Zygmunt Wojciechowski (1900–1955), historian of state and law, founder of the Western Institute
- George Zarnecki (1915–2008), art historian specializing in English Romanesque sculpture
- Czesław Olech (1931–2015), mathematician
- René Maurice Fréchet (1878-1973), mathematician, foreign member

== See also ==
- Polish Academy of Sciences (headquartered in Warsaw)
- Warsaw Society of Friends of Learning
- Poznań Society of Friends of Learning
