= Piotr Krasny =

Art historian (born 1966)

- Born: 29 June 1966
- Citizenship: Polish
- Occupation: Art historian

Academic background
- Education: Jagiellonian University
- Doctoral advisor: Jan Ostrowski

Piotr Paweł Krasny (born 29 June 1966) is an art historian, professor at the Jagiellonian University.

== Biography ==
In 1990 he graduated in art history from the Jagiellonian University. In 1994 he obtained doctorate upon dissertation Bernard Maretyn i problem rokoka w architekturze polskiej supervised by Jan Ostrowski. In 2004 he obtained habilitation.

His interests include the history of modern art in Poland and Central Europe, art theory from the 16th to the 19th centuries, and the protection of cultural heritage. He authored more than a hundred papers on art history. From 2008 to 2012, he served as director of the Institute of Art History at the Jagiellonian University. He also served as a member and chairman of the Council of the National Museum in Kraków. He became a member of the Art History Commission of the Polish Academy of Arts and Sciences. He supervised six doctoral dissertations.

== Works ==
- Katalog zabytków sztuki w Polsce. Przemyśl. Zespoły sakralne. 2004.
- Architektura cerkiewna na ziemiach ruskich Rzeczyspospolitej 1594–1914. 2003.
- Visibilia signa ad pietatem excitantes. Teoria sztuki sakralnej pisarzy kościelnych epoki nowożytnej. 2010.
- Fabrica Ecclesiae Ruthenorum. Dzieje cerkwi w Szczebrzeszynie i jej rozbudowy w latach 1777–1789 w świetle kroniki ks. Jana Karola Lipowieckiego. 2010.
- Figures of Presence and Absence. An Introduction to the French Dispute about Sacred Images and the Role of Art in the Life of the Church in the Early Modern Period. 2019.
- Mediolańskie instrukcje o budynkach i sprzętach kościelnych wydane na polecenie Karola Boromeusza i ich recepcja w Kościele katolickim. 2021. Co-authored with Michał Kurzej.

== Accolades ==
For his scholarly work, he has been awarded with the Prime Minister's Award for an Outstanding Doctoral Dissertation (1995), the Minister of National Education Award (2004), and the Plus Ratio Quam Vis Medal of the Rector of the Jagiellonian University (2022). In May 2004 he received Kraków Book of the Month Award for the book Architektura cerkiewna na ziemiach ruskich Rzeczypospolitej 1594–1914.
