= Trilingual heresy =

Belief in Slavic Christianity

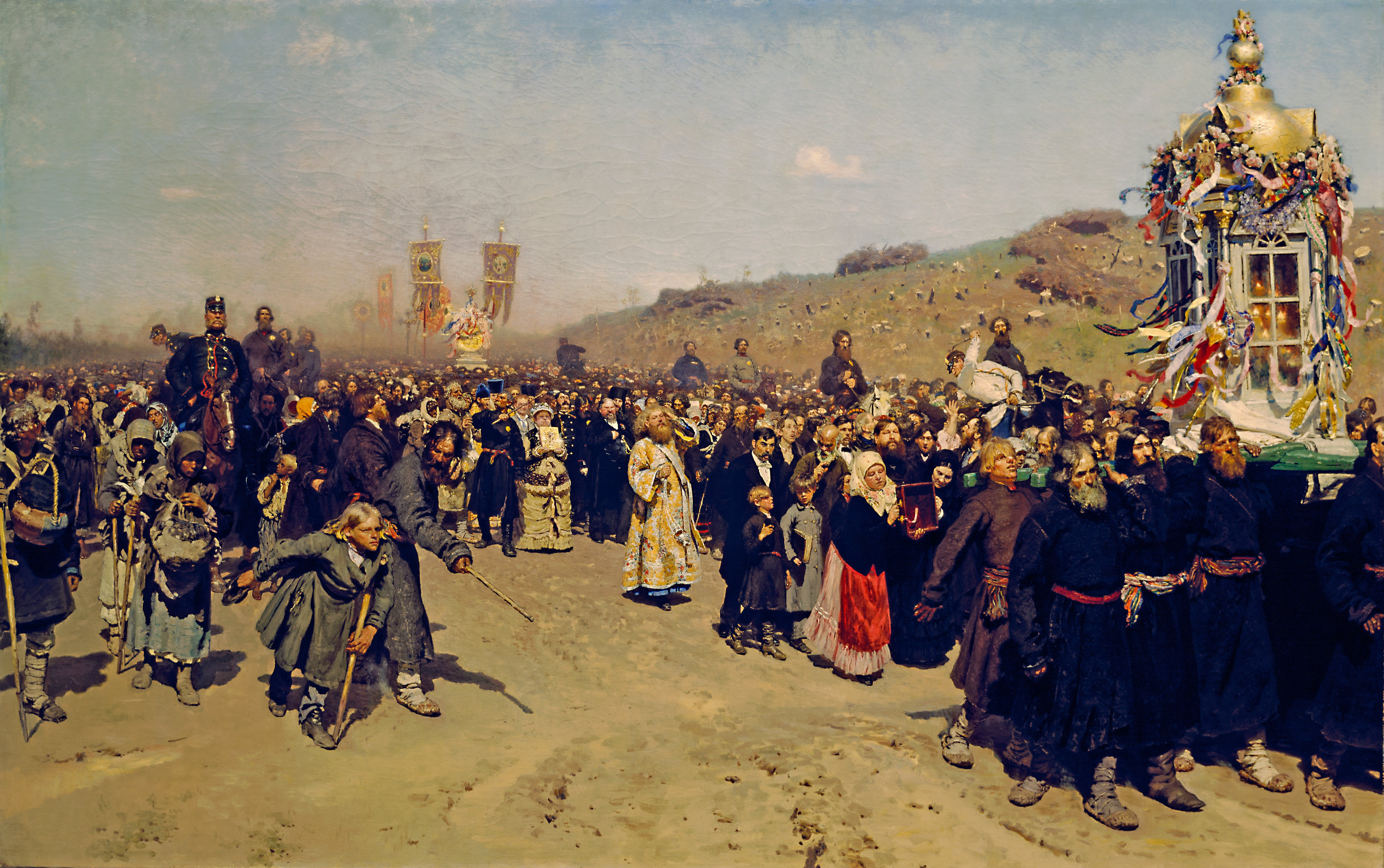
The translation of the Holy Scriptures into Old Church Slavonic gave impetus to mass literacy, education and culture, which today is celebrated as the Day of Slavonic Alphabet, Bulgarian Enlightenment and Culture. That is why the sermons end with ″Alleluia, Alleluia, Alleluia″ against Trilingual heresy.

In Slavic Christianity, the trilingual heresy or Pilatian heresy (less pejoratively trilingualism) is the idea that Biblical Hebrew, Greek, and Latin are the only valid liturgical languages or languages in which one may praise God. Trilingualism was rejected in the 850s by Saints Cyril and Methodius, Byzantine brothers and missionaries who introduced a Christian liturgy in the vernacular of their Slavic converts, a language now called Old Church Slavonic.

== Origins ==
The idea originates as Old Church Slavonic Трьѧзычьници́, (Trĭẽzyčĭnici), literally meaning "threefold paganism" rather than "threefold heresy". It appears as a neologism in several chapters of a contemporary hagiography of Cyril (then named Constantine), most prominently when recounting a disputation in Venice in AD 867 while he and Methodius were en route to the Holy See, bringing relics of Pope Clement I and hoping to resolve a jurisdictional dispute in Great Moravia with Latin Rite missionaries sent by the Bishop of Salzburg. In St. Mark's Square, hostile clerics (branded "Latin accomplices" of the devil) "assembled against [Constantine] like ravens against a falcon and raised the trilingual heresy". Constantine defeated them by citing scripture and by pointing to the many precedents of Oriental Orthodox churches with vernacular liturgy. Elsewhere Constantine points out that Pontius Pilate (hence "Pilatian" heresy) used Hebrew, Greek, and Latin for the inscription on Christ's cross. In Rome Pope Adrian II duly approved the Slavonic liturgy. A generation later, Chernorizets Hrabar's defence of the Glagolitic script used to write Old Church Slavonic, likewise, deprecates trilingualism on the basis that the Slavs would never have been converted if their own language had not been used.

== Historical critiques ==
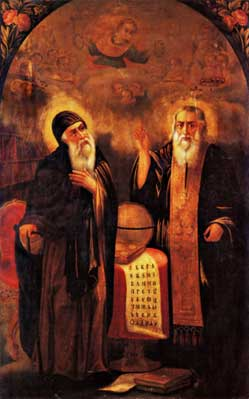
Cyril & Methodius with sample of their script for writing Slavic

Papal edicts of 870 and 880 endorsed Slavonic liturgy, whereas others of the same era do not. Ihor Ševčenko points out that Isidore of Seville had written that Hebrew, Greek, and Latin were the languages of "sacred law". Adrian II's support for Cyril and Methodius has been interpreted as motivated a desire to check the influence of the Bishop of Salzburg, or avoid a dispute with the Ecumenical Patriarch of Constantinople to whom Cyril and Methodius were responsible. A converse suggestion is that trilingualism was invented by the Salzburg lobby to attack Cyril and Methodius.

Some historians have stated that trilingualism was never actually promoted by the Papacy or Constantinople, asserting instead that only the Cyrillic alphabet was considered heretical by some adherents of both the Papacy and Constantinople. Riccardo Picchio regards the Venetian story as apocryphal. The Council of Tours 813 had mandated homilies in the vernacular (Romance or German). For other parts of the Catholic Mass, widespread use of the vernacular rather than Latin came after the Second Vatican Council adopted Sacrosanctum Concilium in 1963. Ševčenko sees the Byzantine church as on the one hand grudging in allowing for vernacular churches, but on the other hand characterising trilingualism after the East–West Schism as an error of the Western church.

== See also ==
- Bible translations into Church Slavonic
