= Jan Juliusz Ostrowski =

Art historian (born 1947)

Jan Ostrowski
- Born: 12 June 1947 (age 79)
- Citizenship: Polish
- Occupation: Art historian

Academic background
- Education: Jagiellonian University

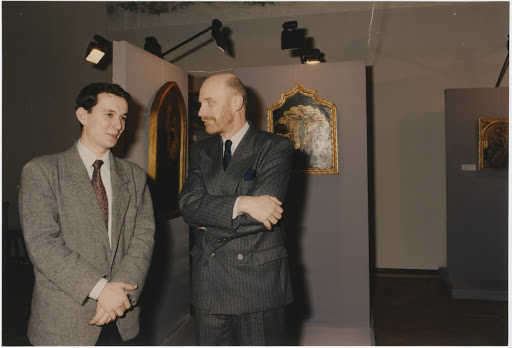
Jan Ostrowski (right) with Andrzej Betlej, 1995

Jan Juliusz Ostrowski (born 12 June 1947) is an art historian, from 1989 to 2020 director of the Wawel Royal Castle National Art Collection, from 2018 president of the Polish Academy of Arts and Sciences.

== Biography ==
In 1970 he graduated from the Jagiellonian University. He worked at the Institute of Art History of the Jagiellonian University. He became a member of the Polish Academy of Arts and Sciences, the Central Commission for Degrees and Titles, the Committee on Art Sciences of the Polish Academy of Sciences, and the deputy chairman of the Social Committee for the Restoration of Kraków Monuments (SKOZK). In the years 1998–2002, on behalf of the Freedom Union, he held the mandate of a councilor of the Lesser Poland Voivodeship Sejmik of the first term.

He supervised eight doctoral dissertations; Piotr Krasny and Andrzej Betlej were among his doctoral students. A book dedicated to him was released in 2017.

== Works ==
- Anton van Dyck. Warszawa. 1980.
- Van Dyck et la peinture génoise du XVII e siècle. Kraków. 1981.
- Piotr Michałowski. Warszawa. 1985.
- Pięć studiów o Piotrze Michałowskim. Kraków. 1988. ISBN 83-08-1-2763-0.
- Die polnische Malerei vom Ende des 18. Jahrhunderts bis zum Beginn der Moderne. Munich. 1989. ISBN 978-3-422-06035-7.
- Mistrzowie malarstwa polskiego. Kraków. 1996. ISBN 978-83-86328-61-1.
- Lwów. Dzieje i sztuka. Kraków. 1997. ISBN 978-83-7052-704-4.
- Podhorce. Dzieje wnętrz pałacowych i galerii obrazów. Kraków. 2001. ISBN 83-908-491-5-1. Co-authored with Jerzy Petrus.
- Barok – romantyzm – kresy. Warszawa-Bellerive-sur-Allier. 2017. ISBN 978-83-286-0015-7.
- Pomiędzy powstaniem a emigracją. Podgórski szkicownik Piotra Michałowskiego z r. 1832. Kraków. 2019. ISBN 978-83-08-06860-1. Co-authored with Elżbieta Wichrowska.
- Portret w dawnej Polsce. Warszawa. 2019. ISBN 978-83-66104-19-8.
- Mit Kenii, czyli swawola Białych. Kraków-Odonów. 2020. ISBN 978-83-7730-427-3.

== Accolades ==
- Commander's Cross of the Order of Polonia Restituta (1994)
- Kraków Book of the Month Award for the book Mistrzowie malarstwa polskiego (December 1996)
- Commander's Cross with Star of the Order of Polonia Restituta (2000)
- Professor Aleksander Gieysztor Award (2008)
- Grand Cross of the Order of Polonia Restituta (2010)
- City of Kraków Award (2010)
- Knight's Cross of the Legion of Honour (2011)
- Bene Merito honorary distinction (2012)
- Officer of the Order of Saint Charles
