= Tadeusz Jan Kowalski =

Polish orientalist

Tadeusz Jan Kowalski (1889–1948) was a Polish orientalist, expert on Middle East Muslim culture and languages. He was a professor at Jagiellonian University, and a member of the Polish Academy of Learning.

== Published works ==
=== Books ===
- Ze studiów nad formą poezji ludów tureckich (1921)
- Arabowie i Turcy w świetle źródeł (1923)
- Turcja powojenna (1925)
- W sprawie zapożyczeń tureckich w języku polskim (1928)
- Karaimische Texte im Dialekt von Troki (1929)
- Próba charakterystyki twórczosci arabskiej (1933)
- Na szlakach islamu (1935)
- Zagadnienie liczby mnogiej w językach tureckich (1936)
- Próba charakterystyki ludów tureckich (1946)
- Studia nad "Shah-name" (1952–1953, 2 v.)

=== Correspondence ===
- (in Polish) Dziurzyńska, E., et al. (Ed.), Korespondencja Tadeusza Kowalskiego z Janem Rypką i Bedřichem Hroznym, Kraków, 2007.

== Sources ==
- Biogramy uczonych polskich, Część I: Nauki społeczne, zeszyt 2: K-O (pod redakcją Andrzeja Śródki i Pawła Szczawińskiego), Ossolineum, Wrocław 1984.
- Majkowska, R. (red.): Tadeusz Kowalski 1889–1948. Materiały z posiedzenia naukowego PAU w dniu 19 czerwca 1998 r., Kraków 1999.
- Stachowski, M.: "Kowalski, Caferoğlu und die Universität Stambul". – Türk Dilleri Araştιrmalarι 8 (Istanbul 1998): 211–228.
