= Mladen Mladenov (wrestler) =

Bulgarian wrestler (born 1957)

Medal record

Men's Greco-Roman wrestling

Representing Bulgaria

Olympic Games
| Bronze medal – third place | 1980 Moskva | flyweight |

Mladen Mladenov (Bulgarian: Младен Младенов) (born 10 March 1957) is a Bulgarian former wrestler who competed in the 1980 Summer Olympics.
