= Lajos Rácz =

Hungarian wrestler (born 1952)

Medal record

Representing Hungary

Men's Greco-Roman wrestling

Olympic Games
Silver medal – second place	1980 Moscow	Flyweight

Lajos Rácz (born in Budapest 1 July 1952) is a Hungarian wrestler. He won an Olympic silver medal in Greco-Roman wrestling in 1980. He won a gold medal at the 1979 World Wrestling Championships.
