= Evacuation of Polish National Treasures during World War II =

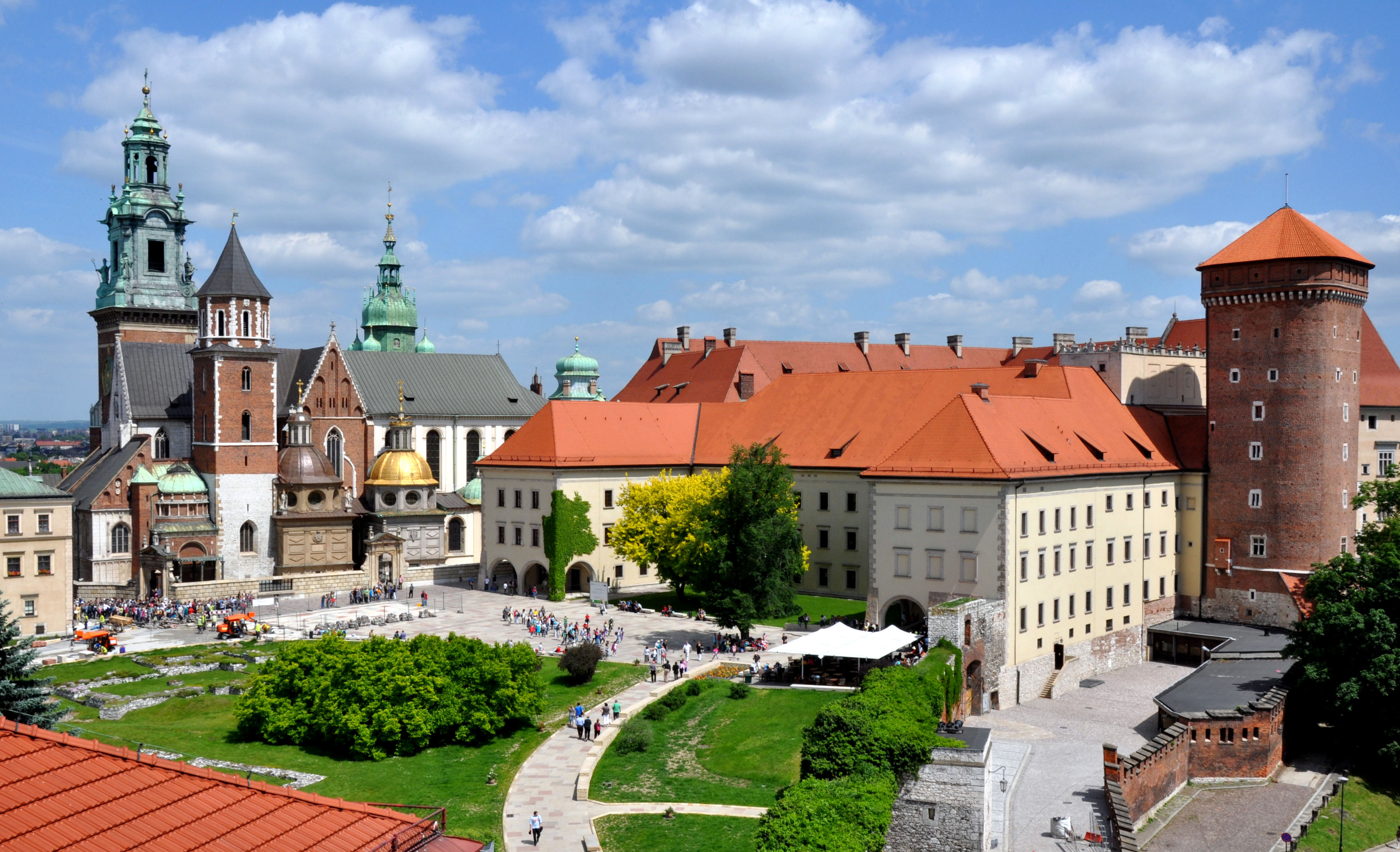
Wawel Castle at present. Home of Polish Crown Jewels and National Art Collection

Between 1939 and 1941 objects of fine and decorative art deemed to be of exceptional artistic or historical value, which became known collectively as Polish National Treasures (Polish: skarby narodowe, French: trésors polonais), were evacuated out of Poland at the onset of World War II in September 1939 and transported via Romania, France, and Britain to Canada. The bulk of them came from the Wawel Castle in Kraków and included a rich collection of Jagiellonian tapestries, as well as Szczerbiec, the medieval coronation sword of Polish kings; these came to be known as Wawel Treasures (Polish: skarby wawelskie), an appellation sometimes erroneously extended to all of the evacuated items. Most of the rest of the salvaged objects were manuscripts from the National Library in Warsaw, including the earliest documents in the Polish language and Frédéric Chopin's autograph sheet music. The treasures were complemented by works of art from the Royal Castle of Warsaw and a Gutenberg Bible from the library of the Catholic Higher Seminary of Pelplin. After the end of the war, the treasures remained in Canada for nearly two decades due to competing claims made by the new communist government of Poland and the London-based Polish government-in-exile. Negotiations spanned over fifteen years before they were eventually returned to Poland in 1961.

== The treasures ==
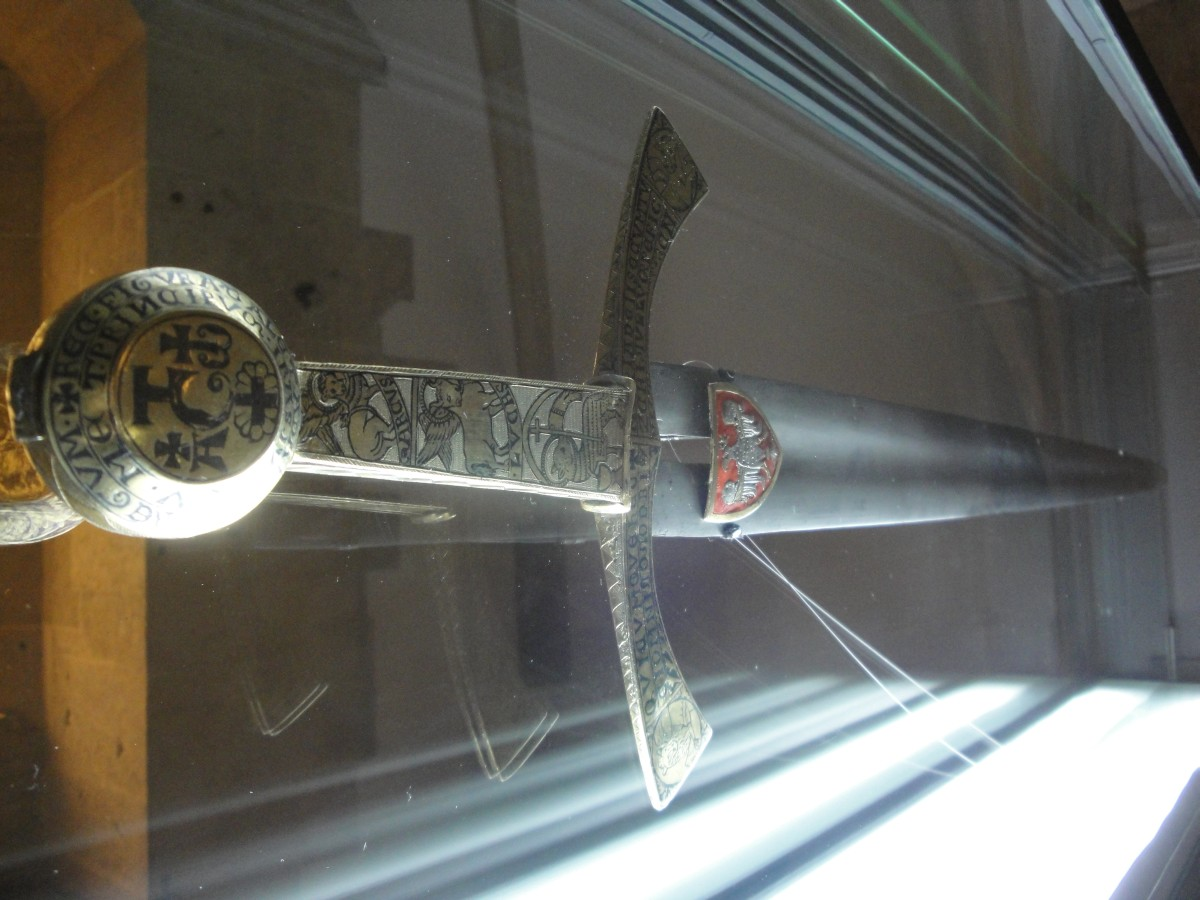
Szczerbiec, the Coronation Sword.

This collection consists of hundreds of pieces, some of which are globally notable.

=== The Coronation Sword ===
Szczerbiec, commonly referred to as Poland's Coronation Sword, is a two-handed antique battle weapon that had been used to crown Polish kings for generations. Its popularity is derived, in part, from a myth attached to the blade in which legend dictated that any king that did not use this sword at coronation would endanger the borders of his country, putting his kingdom at risk of invasion. It possesses a bejewelled hilt, encapsulating a number of Polish engravings. It is the only preserved piece of the Polish Crown Jewels still in existence today.

=== The Gutenberg Bible ===
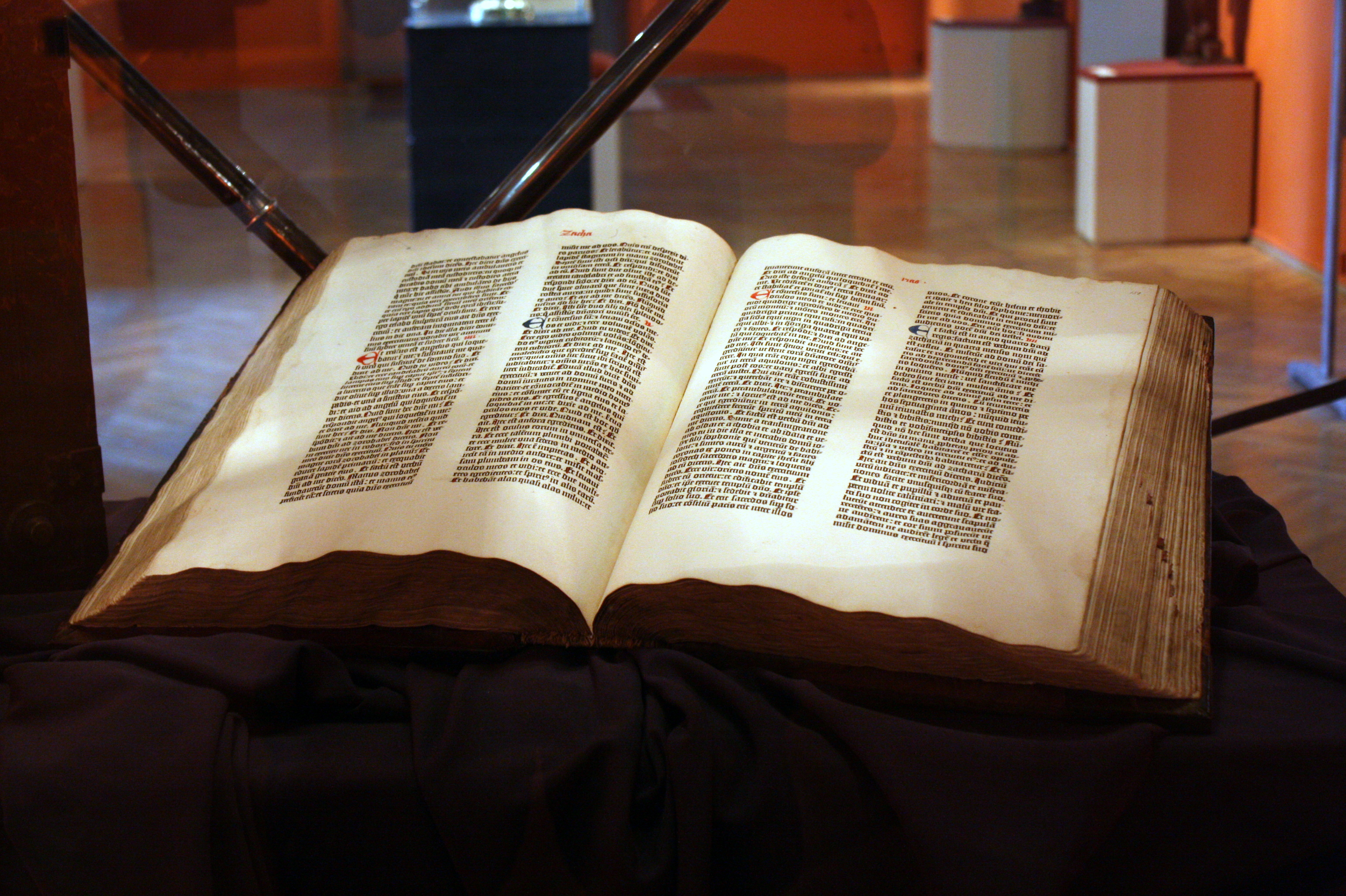
A Gutenberg Bible from the Diocesan Museum in Pelplin

Created by Johannes Gutenberg, the inventor credited with bringing the practice of printing to Europe, this Bible represents one of the first major works printed with movable type in 1455. It is beloved, among many reasons, because it is considered to be a piece of exceptional quality largely due to Gutenberg's choice of ink, binding, and printing materials in its construction. Approximately 180 copies were originally produced, with each surviving copy now worth upwards of $100 million.

=== Jagiellonian Tapestries ===
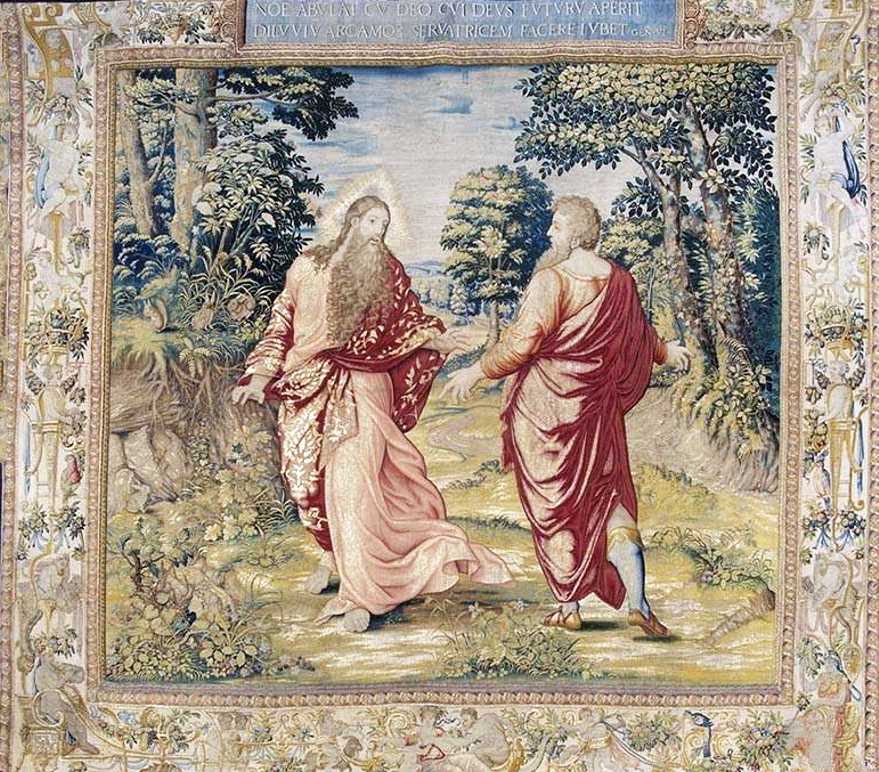
Noah's Conversation with God, a Flemish tapestry from King Sigismund Augustus's collection

Originally commissioned by King Sigismund II Augustus, these tapestries came into existence to commemorate the commencement of his third marriage.They can be described as fairly large pieces of silk, often stretching across meters of space, with lengths of gold and silver thread woven into the fabric. Every piece is unique in that they depict different settings or scenes in history, often possessing religious connotations (like Noah's Ark). The collection consisted of over 300 original pieces. However, over half of them were pawned by a later king at a time when Poland was in great financial debt. Afterward, only 137 pieces remained. As a whole, though, they compose the largest collection of tapestries ever commissioned by a single ruler. They are widely considered to be masterpieces of art and Europe's greatest tapestry collection.

== Journey abroad ==
Concern grew for the safety of the treasures at the Castle when Poland faced the imminent invasion of Nazi soldiers in 1939. Adolf Hitler's Third Reich was moving eastward across Europe, and had already issues multiple threats to the nation. The Polish government was determined to protect their most ancient and valuable historical pieces from the Nazi party, so they made the decision to move them across Europe until they had found the treasures a safe place to hide. They began constructing large cases and cylinders for the relics, closing off the Castle from public access in order to prepare them for transport in secret.

=== Across Europe ===
The treasures took longer to prepare than expected, leaving the Castle two days after Germany had already invaded Poland. Fortunately, Hans Frank (the Nazi Governor-General in charge of Poland's takeover) and his men did not storm the Castle and seize it for themselves until after the treasures had already departed. They were secretly loaded onto barges, wagons, buses, and trucks. To ensure their safe transport they were accompanied by Stanislaw Zaleski and Jozef Polkowski, two curators from Wawel Castle familiar with the treasures.

The treasures and the curators travelled to the border of Poland, where they mixed with a group of refugees fleeing the country and heading for Romania. From there, they made their way to the embassy in Bucharest to seek temporary shelter. At this point, Zaleski and Polkowski had no idea where they were going to hide the treasures. They explored various options at this time, attempting to secure storage in Switzerland or Vatican City. However, both endeavors proved to be fruitless.

They again moved locations, this time to Malta where they resided for approximately two weeks while they continued to strategize. There, they learned of France's efforts to hide the French State Collection in various factories while the Nazis roamed Eastern Europe. Upon hearing this, they travelled to Aubusson where they hid the Wawel Treasures in a vacant factory, as well. However, this hiding place only lasted for six months until the Nazis breached Western Europe, forcing Zaleski and Polkowski to move once again.

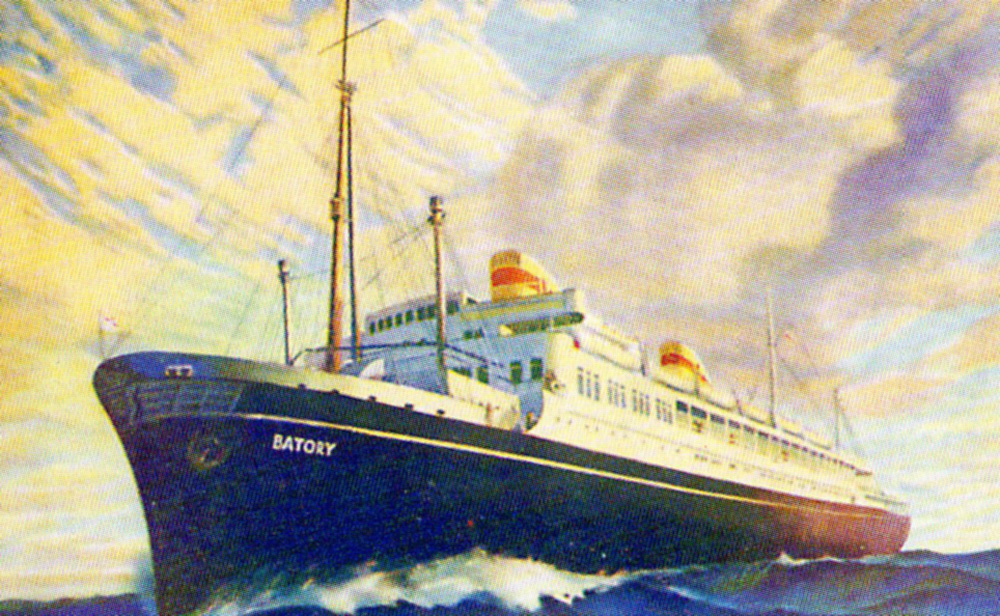
The MS Batory

At this point, the curators believed that the only way to keep the treasures from being seized by the Nazis was to send them across the Atlantic Ocean. They journeyed to the Polish embassy in London, with the intention of arranging for the pieces to be transported to Canada. The collection was secretly placed aboard the MS Batory, which was destined for North America. In order to further ensure the treasures' safety, the ship joined a larger fleet travelling under the name Operation Fish, in which an unprecedented amount of European valuables were secretly being transported by boat to Canada for safekeeping. They embarked on their journey on July 4, 1940.

=== In Canada ===
The Batory docked in Halifax, Nova Scotia on July 12, 1940. The treasures were allowed to enter Canada duty-free since they were considered to be private property of the Polish government. They were then transferred via train to Ottawa, Ontario with the Royal Canadian Mounted Police serving as their escorts. After being temporarily stored at the Polish consulate, the treasures were moved to a storage building at the Experimental Farm after Zaleski and Polkowski were informed of its fireproof and temperature-controlled environment.

== The search ==
=== After the war ===
In 1945, the Soviet Union had taken over and established a new regime in Poland, much to the dismay of the Polish natives who had been chased out of their home country by the Nazis. This did not sit well with Polkowski, who argued with Zaleski that returning the treasures to Poland after the war as planned would place them in the hands of the Soviets. The original Polish government, in exile in London, sent Wacław Babiński to Ottawa. There, he plotted with the curators to move the Wawel collection from their current location in order to keep them from the new Polish government when their representatives eventually came looking for them.

Thus, the men began to redistribute the works across Central Canada. They packed the antiquities into large trunks and quietly removed them from the storage building at the Experimental Farm. They sent two trunks nearby to the Bank of Montreal in Ottawa to be secretly stored in one of their vaults. Among its contents were the Coronation Sword and the Gutenberg Bible, two of the collection's most valuable pieces. Eight trunks of Polish military pieces were also shipped to a nearby location, having been moved to the Convent of the Precious Blood in Ottawa. The remaining twenty-four trunks were sent to a monastery in Sainte-Anne-de-Beaupre near Quebec City. However, they left a small portion of the collection behind at the Experimental Farm in the hopes of fooling the Soviets into believing that the entire collection still remained there.

=== Canadian involvement ===
Dr. Fiderkiewicz, a representative from the new Polish regime, arrived in Canada in 1946 to make a formal request for the return of the Wawel treasures. It did not take him long to discover the near-vacant state of the storage building at the Experimental Farm. He placed a call to Canada's Department of External Affairs, which alerted the government to the disappearance of the treasures nearly a year after they had been moved. Fiderkiwicz quickly surmised that the Canadian government had no idea that the Polish works had been moved, let alone where they were hiding now. Canadian officials feigned ignorance, asserting that the curators who accompanied the collection to Canada possessed full legal responsibility over it. Still, they offered to retrace the steps of the treasures in the hopes of maintaining good international relations.

They were eventually successful in this endeavor, locating each place in which the curators had sent the Polish pieces. However, verifying this information proved difficult since most of these locations were places of religious worship, which the government had no legal right to search without cause. To make matters more difficult, each location admitted to their culpability in storing the treasures but vehemently insisted that they had already been removed from their care; they lied. Polkowski had instructed them to do so in the hopes of determining the loyalty of his partner, Zaleski. Once word got back to Fiderkiewicz that they treasures had to still be at the disclosed locations, Polkowski knew that Zaleski had switched allegiances and so he secretly arranged to have the entire collection moved again.

=== Legal issues ===
Polkowski's efforts proved to be almost successful. Unfortunately for him, Fiderkiewicz called a press conference to divulge to the world that he had discovered the two trunks stored in the vaults at the Bank of Montreal in Ottawa and was negotiating for their safe return. This drew international attention to the matter, since the world had been unaware of the harrowing journey the Wawel treasures had been on. Canada, which at this point had remained silent on the matter, was forced to make a statement due to the global scrutiny they were now receiving.

William Lyon Mackenzie King, the Prime Minister at the time, asserted that since the treasures entered Canada as private property of the Polish government, they had no right to get involved in the management of their possessions. In what he described as a show of good faith, he offered the Polish government a deal – the RCMP would be enlisted to track down and retrieve the entire collection on the condition that they could be put in display in Canada for a period of five years before being sent back to Poland. Perceiving this as act of disrespect, Poland profusely refused this offer. Mackenzie King went on to suggest that, since Canada had no legal parameters to extradite the curators or export the treasures, the Polish government could seek legal action as a private individual in the Canadian court system against those they believed were responsible for wrongfully moving Polish property from their designated location (i.e. Zaleski and Polkowski). Again, Poland refused this suggestion.

=== Stalemate ===
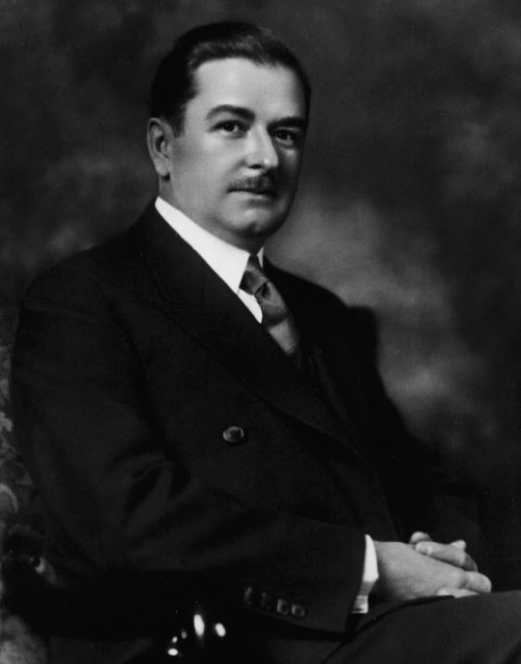
Maurice Duplessis

Despite Poland's anger towards Canada over the matter, the RCMP was still enlisted to search Central Canada for the remainder of the missing relics. Some officers eventually discovered that the majority of the trunks had been hidden at L'Hôtel-Dieu Hospital in Quebec City. Before the Canadian government could negotiate with the appropriate parties to come to a peaceful resolution, the Polish government intervened and issued a flurry of threats to the hospital demanding their cooperation. A group of nuns residing at L'Hôtel-Dieu sent a letter to Maurice Duplessis, the Premier of Quebec, asking for his immediate assistance in the matter. As a result, he moved the entire collection to the Provincial Museum before the RCMP could act.

Duplessis refused to return the collection to Poland, citing that the communist government now in office had no right to them. He believed the true owners of the treasures were still in exile, residing in London as a separate faction. He acknowledged that the Canadian government had no legal right to remove the Wawel pieces from his province's museum. Furthermore, if the RCMP stormed the Provincial Museum illegally and forcibly removed the works from his possession, the Canadian government would appear to be supporting a communist government, which would harm their international relationships with other sovereign nations. Duplessis had both nations exactly where he wanted them – unable to act – for the next five years.

== Journey home ==
The death of Joseph Stalin, the premier of the Soviet Union, in 1953 triggered a series of events that started to move things along. The newly elected government in Poland appeared to be independent of the Soviet Union's influence, and so the Bank of Montreal completed negotiations with Polish officials to release the two trunks in their possession to Poland's custody. A group of delegates arrived to accompany the pieces back home. They travelled from Montreal to Toronto through Ottawa and then to New York to avoid Duplessis' government. Eventually, they made their way across the ocean to Poland where they were quickly put back on display at Wawel Castle. Among these pieces were the Coronation Sword and Gutenberg Bible, two of Poland's most valuable treasures.

The death of Duplessis in 1959 was the last piece of the puzzle Poland needed to retrieve their cultural property. The new party that took over Quebec's government wanted to repair its image in the international community, so in 1960 it agreed to return all of the treasures to Poland. The only stipulation was that neither the Provincial Museum nor the provincial government could be held legally accountable for what had transpired over the last decade. Upon Poland's agreement to these terms, the remaining trunks were loaded into trucks and driven to Boston. There, they boarded a ship bound for Gdynia, Poland. A large winter storm slightly delayed their voyage, but eventually the relics reached their homeland. They boarded a train to Warsaw for inspection, and then were promptly shipped to Kraków to be put back on display at Wawel Castle.

== Aftermath ==
After two decades abroad, the Wawel Treasures had finally returned to their original location. While their journey was tumultuous, the ordeal appears to have strengthened the political bond between Canada and Poland. Polish officials bestowed a reproduction of the Gutenberg Bible to the Canadian government to show their government's appreciation for Canada's efforts in retrieving the treasures. Their recovery contributed to the restoration of Wawel Castle as one of Poland's national museums. They are now on display as a major component of the Wawel Royal Castle National Art Collection.
