= Jagiellonian tapestries =

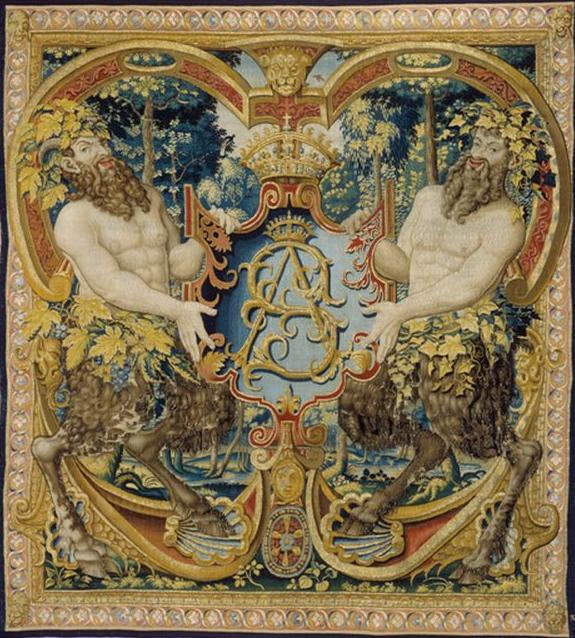
Tapestry with shield-bearing satyrs and monogram SA of king Sigismund Augustus, ca. 1555.

The Jagiellonian tapestries (Polish: Arrasy wawelskie), are a collection of tapestries woven in the Netherlands and Flanders, which originally consisted of 365 pieces assembled by the Jagiellons to decorate the interiors of the royal Wawel Castle in Kraków, Poland. The collection is also collectively known as the Wawel Arrasses, as the majority of the preserved fabrics are in the possession of the Wawel Castle Museum and the French city of Arras, which was once a manufacturing centre of this kind of wall decoration in the beginning of the 16th century. The works became state property of the Crown of the Kingdom of Poland according to the will of Sigismund II Augustus.

== History and components ==
The first tapestries were brought by Queen Bona Sforza as her wedding dowry. Then in 1526 and 1533, Sigismund I the Old ordered 108 fabrics in Antwerp and Bruges. Most of the tapestries, however, were commissioned by king Sigismund II Augustus in Brussels in the workshops of Willem and Jan de Kempeneer, Jan van Tieghem and Nicolas Leyniers between 1550-1565. Initially, there were about 170 tapestries in the royal collection, among them 84 black-and-white tapestries with the royal crest and the letters SA, 8 tapestries which Sigismund I the Old had been received from the Emperor Maximilian I, and others, gifts from foreign delegations. The gifts include one tapestry with the Polish eagle bearing the date 1560, the royal initials and the letters CKCH (Christophorus Krupski Capitaneus Horodlo) next to the Korczak coat of arms and the inscription SCABELLVM PEDVM TVORVM (the footstool under your feet, from Psalm 110 (A Psalm of David)), a gift from Krzysztof Krupski, starost of Horodło for Sigismund Augustus. The tapestries had been displayed publicly for the first time during the wedding of king Sigismund Augustus with Catherine of Austria. To this day, preserved about 138 of which exposed are about 30. They were matched in size to the walls and some of them reach the size of 5 × 9 m (5.47 × 9.84 yd). The tapestries were made of wool strands, silk and gold and woven on looms with a density of about 8 - 10 warp threads per centimeter.

This series consists of the following subjects:

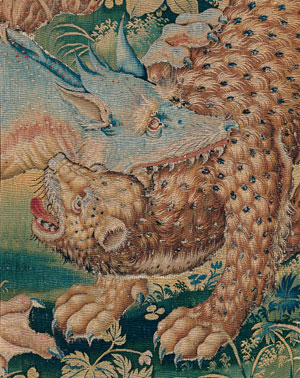
Verdure Dragon fighting with a panther (detail), design by the circle of Pieter Coecke van Aelst.

- Biblical scenes - scenes from the Story of the First Parents, the Story of Noah and the Story of Tower of Babel (inventory number of the Wawel Museum 1 - 18), the Story of Moses, the Story of Absalom the Story of Nebuchadnezzar and the Story of Saul (scattered), created according to design by Michiel Coxie - biblical scenes, fillets by an unknown artist from the circle of painters Cornelis Floris and Cornelis Bos,
- Mythological scenes - scenes from the Trojan War, the Military expeditions of the Persian king Cyrus, the Story of Romulus and Remus, the Story of Scipio, the Story of Hannibal, the Story of Julius Caesar and the Story of Octavian Augustus (scattered),
- landscape and animal scenes (verdure) (inventory number of the Wawel Museum 19 - 78) created around 1560, according to design by an unknown artist from the circle of Pieter Coecke van Aelst (sometimes associated with Willem Tons),
- grotesque scenes with the coats of arms of Poland and Lithuania and the royal initials (inventory number of the Wawel Museum 79 - 134/2) created around 1560, according to design by an unknown artist from the circle of painters Cornelis Floris and Cornelis Bos, three grotesque (inventory number 92, 93, 94) were based on drawings by Cornelis Bos.

Biblical tapestries are exhibited in rotation in the chambers on the second floor of the castle, and the tapestries with animals, as well as grotesques with monograms and coats of arms on both floors. This is the largest collection of tapestries ever commissioned by one ruler. According to the will of the last Jagiellonian king the Flemish Arrases in gold or figured, together with those of simpler kind were given to the king's three sisters and after their death, they had become the property of the State Treasury, under the custody of the Commonwealth's parliament to serve the public good of the Commonwealth and not for private benefit of future kings (fragment of the Diet's resolution).

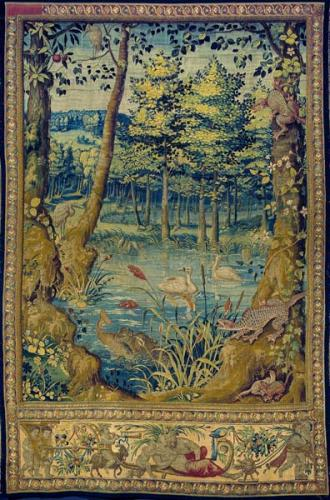
Verdure An otter with a fish in its mouth, Jan van Tieghem's workshop, ca. 1555.

Unfortunately, the not quite precise will became a cause of many conflicts over ownership of the tapestries between the kings and nobles. The whole collection was only together for a short time at the Castle in Tykocin until 1572. Then the king's sisters scattered it between their residences in Kraków, Niepołomice, Warsaw, Vilnius and Hrodna, and even sent some to Sweden. The king Sigismund III Vasa brought back 30 pieces that Anna Jagiellon sent to Stockholm to her sister Catherine (Sigismund's mother). In 1633, three of the tapestries with scenes from the Story of Moses, were presented by Jerzy Ossoliński, on behalf of king Władysław IV Vasa, to Pope Urban VIII. During the Deluge the collection was hidden by Jerzy Sebastian Lubomirski in his estates in Spiš. In the following years the king John II Casimir Vasa mortgaged 157 tapestries to a merchant from Gdańsk, Jan Gratta, without the consent of parliament. In order to force the lifetime wages after his abdication the king also took some of the tapestries to France. This caused protests from the nobility and the king's debt was not repaid until 1724. The parliament submitted the tapestries for safekeeping in the Warsaw's Carmelite convent and for the last time they were displayed during the coronation of king Stanisław Augustus in 1764. After the major reconstruction of the Warsaw Royal Castle's interiors in the neoclassical style the king ordered new tapestries in France and the Jagiellonian collection was rolled up and stored in the building of the Treasury Committee - Palace of the Republic. According to an inventory performed during the reign of Stanisław Augustus there were about 156 arrasses. In 1795, after the Third Partition of Poland, the tapestries along with other goods plundered from the royal residencies, were taken by Alexander Suvorov to Russia.

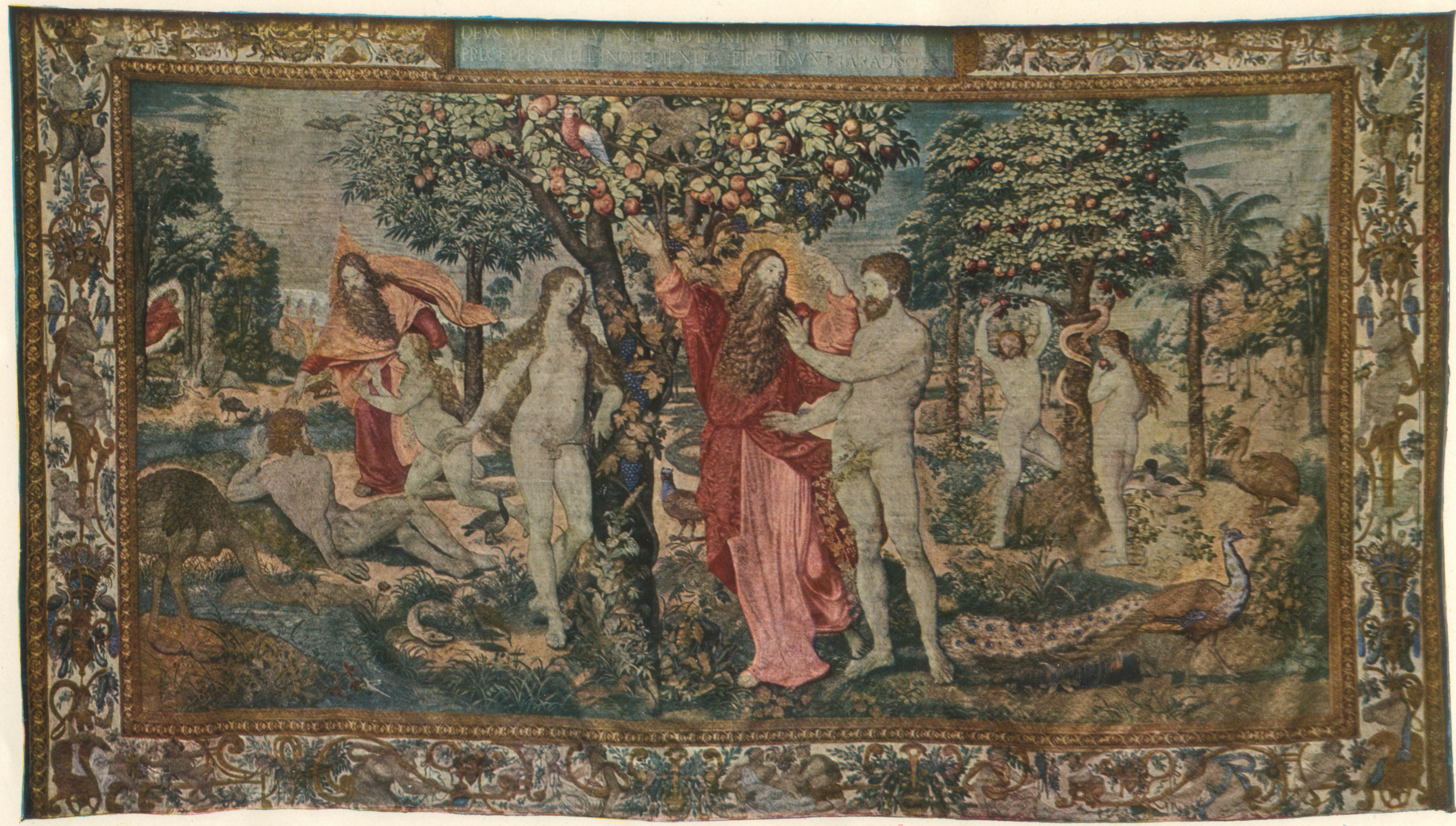
Paradise Bliss, Jan de Kempeneer's workshop, ca. 1550.

After regaining independence and victorious war with the Soviet Union the Polish government managed to recover 137 fabrics, in various states of preservation, between 1922-1924. The tapestries were cut to fit the walls of the Winter Palace and Gatchina Palace, or they were used as furniture upholstery. Some of them are still in Russia, displayed in different museums, without specifying their origin, the Soviets claimed that the tapestries are equivalent for the Polish debts. When the Second World War broke out in 1939, the tapestries stored at Wawel Castle were transported through Romania, France and England to Canada to be finally returned, after 15 years of negotiations, to the People's Republic of Poland in the 1960s. In 1961, when the royal collection was coming back from a long journey it was greeted by the Sigismund Bell and the Kraków inhabitants. Today 137 fabrics are owned by the Wawel Royal Castle (2 of them, Forest landscape with a deer and a duck catching fish and the Forest landscape with a deer and giraffes by Nicolas Leyniers, are displayed in the Warsaw Royal Castle), the Moral fall of the humanity before the deluge, returned to Poland in 1977 as a gift from the Soviet Union, it is in the Royal Castle in Warsaw and one of the missing, which appeared on the antique market in the 1950s and was purchased by the Rijksmuseum in Amsterdam. Today, the 136 that are still in possession of the Wawel castle make up Europe's best tapestry collections.

== See also ==
- Evacuation of Polish National Treasures during World War II
