= Wawel Royal Castle – State Art Collection =

Residence museum and collection in Wawel Castle, Kraków, Poland

- Zamek Królewski na Wawelu – Państwowe Zbiory Sztuki
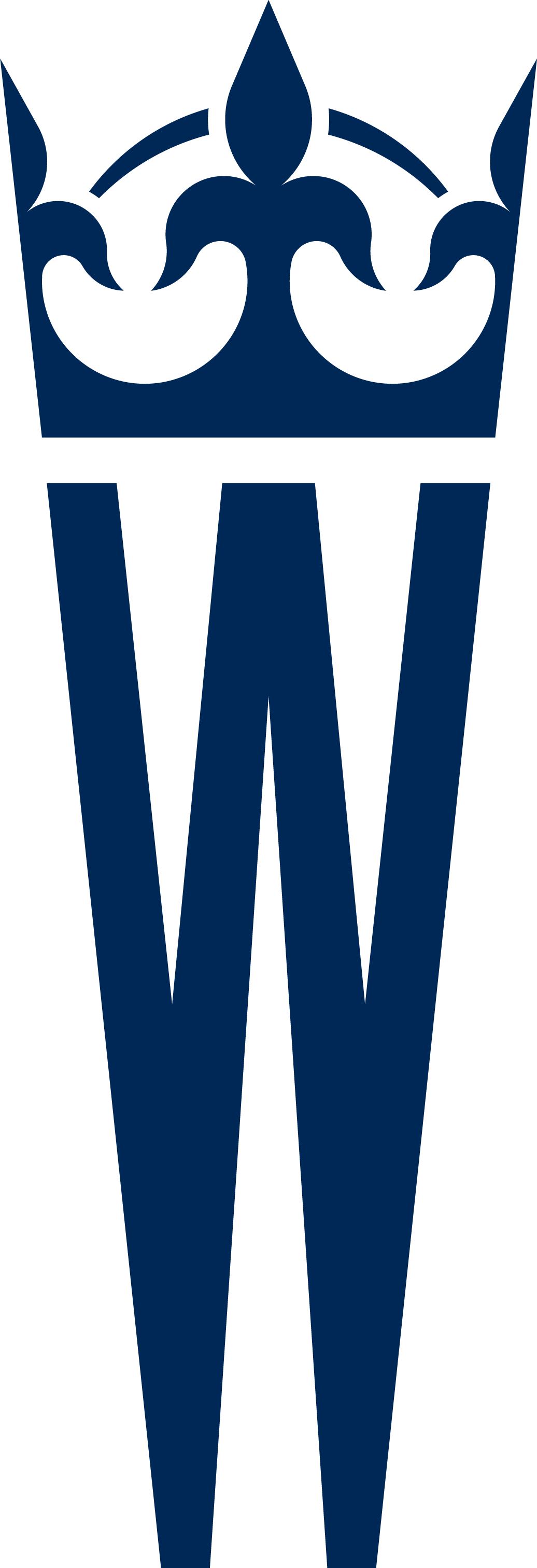

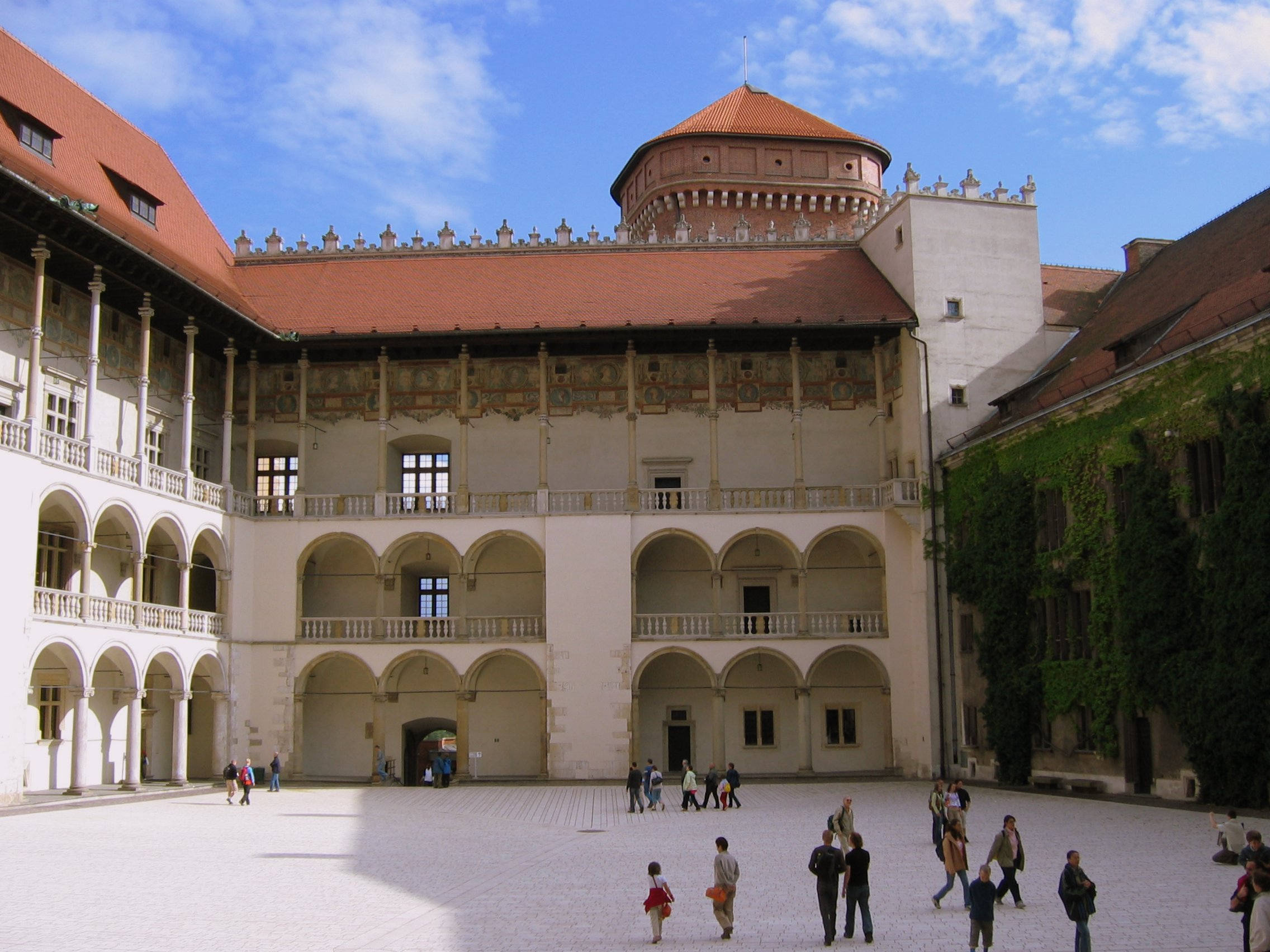
- Arcade courtyard of the Wawel Castle
- Established: 1945
- Location: Wawel Hill, Kraków, Poland
- Coordinates: 50°03′15″N 19°56′07″E
- Type: Historic residence
- Visitors: 2.100.000 (in 2019)
- Director: Andrzej Betlej
- Owner: State-owned
- Website: www.wawel.krakow.pl/en

The Wawel Royal Castle – State Art Collection (Polish: Zamek Królewski na Wawelu – Państwowe Zbiory Sztuki) is the residence museum and collection housed in the historic Wawel Castle of Kraków. The collection was inaugurated officially in 1930, with its current name introduced in 1994.

== Divisions ==
Non-administrative departments

- Department of Archaeology
- Department of Ceramics
- Department of Education
- Department of Exhibitions
- Department of Furniture and Clocks
- Department of Goldsmithing
- Department of Inventories and Catalogues
- Department of Metalwork
- Department of Militaria
- Department of Paintings, Prints and Sculptures
- Department of Photographic Documentation
- Department of Publishing
- Department of Reserves and Lapidarium
- Department of Textiles
- Archives
- Library

Conservation studios

- Painting, Sculpture and Craftsmanship Conservation Studio
- Furniture Conservation Studio
- Paper Conservation Studio
- Frames Conservation Studio
- Textile Conservation Studio
- Archaeological Conservation Studio

== Floor plans ==
Ground floor

State rooms (yellow)
1. Governor's room
2. Governor's study
3. Governor's bedchamber
4. Deputies' Staircase

The Lost Wawel (brown)
13–14. Gothic foundations
15. Rotunda of the Blessed Virgin Mary
16–17. Archaeological finds
18–19. Lapidarium

Treasury and Armory (blue)
5. Pole-arms and two-handed swords
6. Armors
7. West European weapons
8. Guns and crossbows
9. Casimir the Great Vault
10. Jagiełło and Hedwig Vault
11. Vault in the Sigismund III Tower
12. Parade weapons

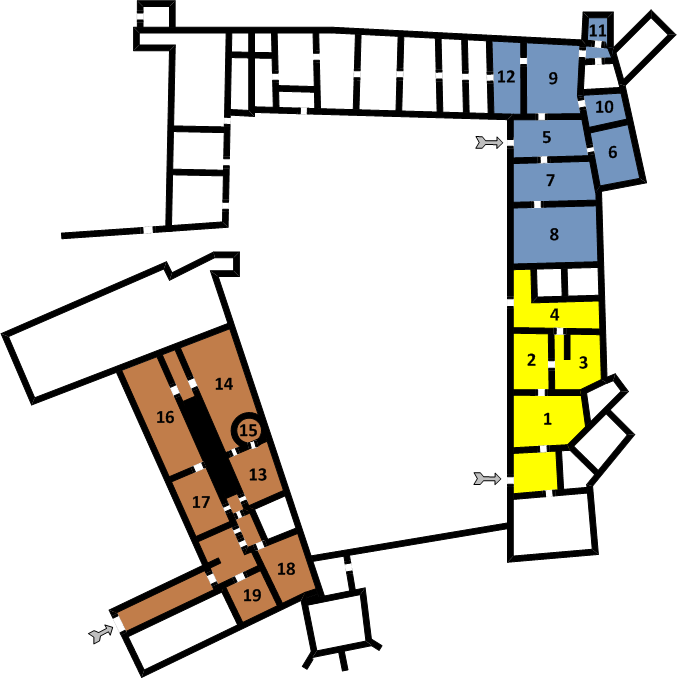

First floor

Private Royal Apartments (red)
1. Guests' bedchamber
2–4. Apartments
3a. Italian study in the Jordanka Tower
5. Deputies' Staircase
6–7. Retinue rooms
8. Grey Antechamber
9. Antechamber in the Danish Tower
10. Presidential apartment
11. Antechamber in the Hen's Foot Tower
12. Study in the Hen's Foot Tower
13. Study in the Sigismund III Tower
14. King's bedchamber

15. Antechamber
16. Saxon Antechamber
17. Saxon Room
18. Column Hall
19. Vestibule
20. Senators' Staircase

Oriental Art (green)
21. Vestibule
22. Ottoman banners
23. Ottoman tents
24. Chinese vases
25–26. Japanese porcelain

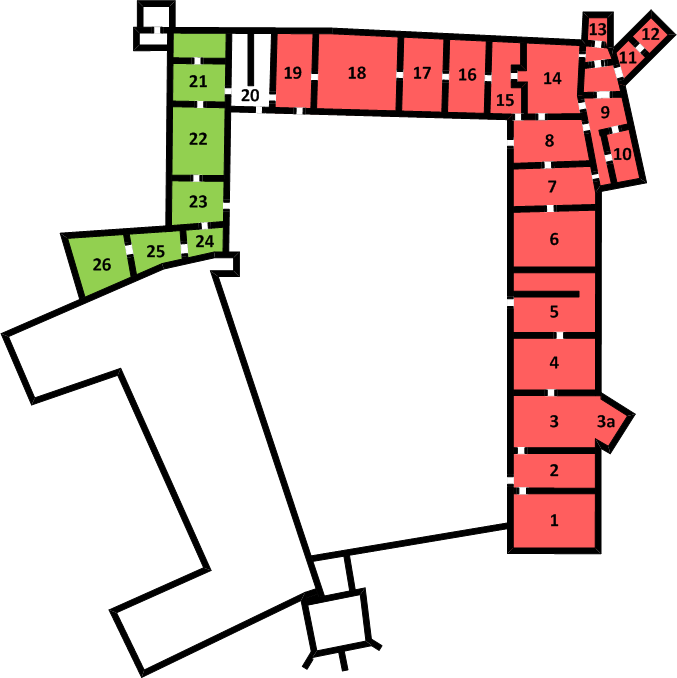

Second floor

State Rooms (yellow)
1. Deputies' Hall
2. Army Review Room
3. Tournament Room
4. Deputies' Staircase
5. Zodiac Room
6. Planets Room
7. Antechamber
8. Interior of the Danish Tower

9. Birds Room
10. Chapel
11. Study in the Sigismund III Tower
12. Antechamber
13. Eagle Hall
14. Vestibule
15. Senators' Hall
16. Senators' Staircase

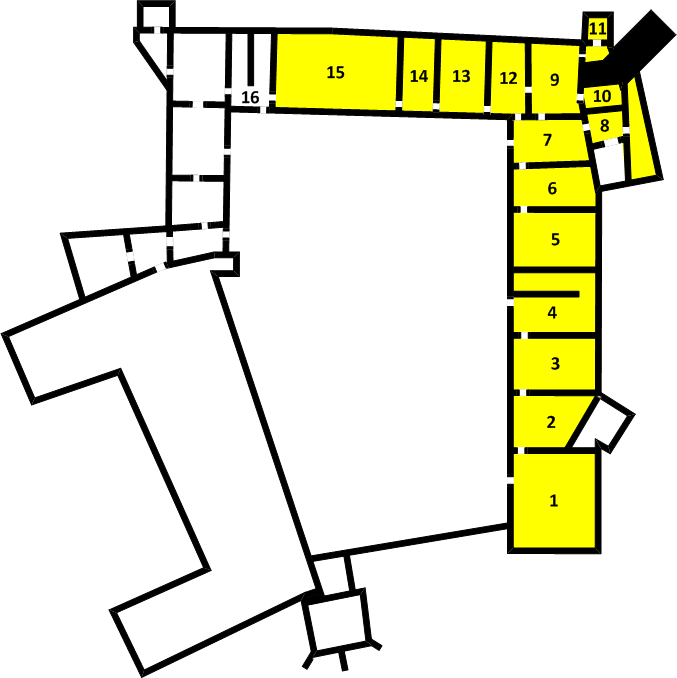

== Directors of Wawel Castle ==
- Tadeusz Mańkowski (1945–1951)
- Jerzy Szablowski (1951–1989)
- Jan Ostrowski (1989–2020)
- Andrzej Betlej (2020– )

== See also ==
- Evacuation of Polish National Treasures during World War II

== Sources ==
- Statut Zamku Królewskiego na Wawelu – Państwowych Zbiorów Sztuki. Załącznik do zarządzenia Nr 35 Ministra Kultury i Dziedzictwa Narodowego z dnia 14.07.2011 r. [Charter of the Wawel Royal Castle National Art Collection. Attachment to Regulation No. 35 of the Minister of Culture and National Heritage], Dz. Urz. MKiDN z 2011 r. Nr 5, poz. 44 (2011-07-14)
- "Wawel Royal Castle". Wawel Royal Castle National Art Collection.
- "The institution".
