= Antonín Jelínek =

Czech wrestler

Personal information
- Nationality: Czech
- Born: 4 November 1956 (age 69) Chomutov, Czechoslovakia

Sport
- Sport: Wrestling

Antonín Jelínek (born 4 November 1956) is a Czech wrestler. He competed in the men's Greco-Roman 52 kg at the 1980 Summer Olympics.
