= Andrzej Betlej =

Art historian (born 1971)

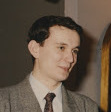
- Andrzej Betlej
- Born: October 26, 1971 (age 54); Kraków, Poland
- Occupation: Art historian
- Known for: Research on Polish and Central European art history

Academic background
- Education: Jagiellonian University
- Doctoral advisor: Jan Ostrowski

Academic work
- Discipline: Art history

Andrzej Tadeusz Betlej (born 26 October 1971) is an art historian, from 2016 to 2020 director of the National Museum in Kraków, from 2020 director of the Wawel Royal Castle National Art Collection.

== Biography ==
In 1995 he graduated with a master's degree in art history from the Jagiellonian University. In 1999 he obtained doctorate at the Jagiellonian University upon dissertation supervised by Jan Ostrowski. In 2011 he obtained habilitation.

From 2012 to 2015 he was director of the Institute of Art History of the Jagiellonian University. Since 2012, he has been the editor-in-chief of the journal Modus. Works on the History of Art. He was chosen a member of Stowarzyszenie Historyków Sztuki and Polskie Towarzystwo Badań nad Wiekiem Osiemnastym. In the years 2015–2018 he was a member of the Scientific Council of the Institute of Art of the Polish Academy of Sciences. He supervised four doctoral dissertations.

He joined the Support Committee for Andrzej Duda before the second presidential elections in Poland in 2020.

== Accolades ==
In December 2010, he received Kraków Book of the Month Award for the book Sibi, Deo, Posteritati: Jabłonowscy a sztuka w XVIII wieku.
