= Abdulnasser El-Oulabi =

Syrian wrestler (born 1959)

Abdulnasser El-Oulabi (born 2 September 1959) is a Syrian former wrestler who competed in the 1980 Summer Olympics.
