= Marek Biliński =

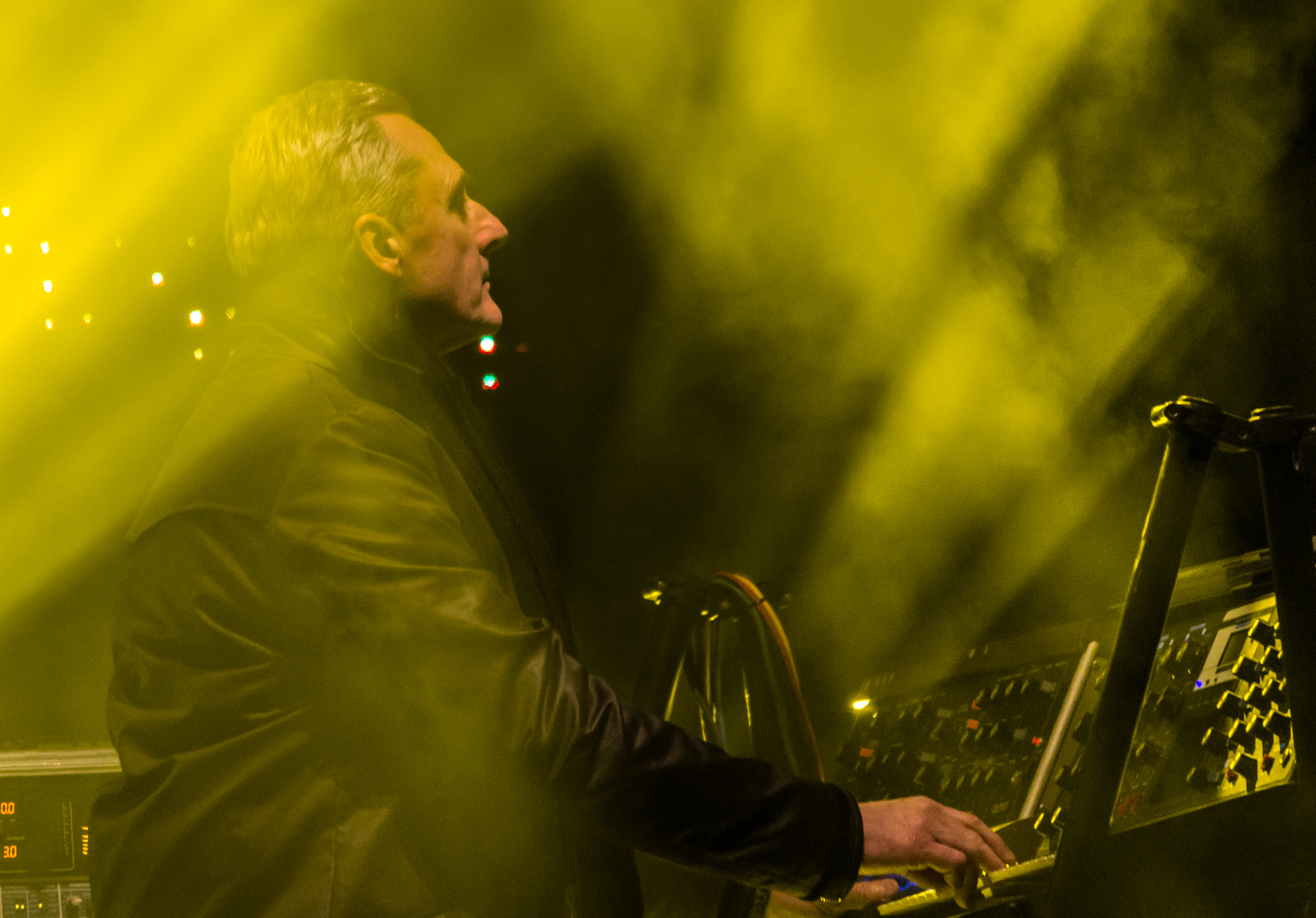

Background information
- Born: Marek Biliński; 17 May 1953 (age 73); Szczecin, Poland
- Genre: Electronic
- Occupation: Electronic Musician
- Instruments: Keyboard, Minimoog, Moog Voyager, Yamaha VL1, Roland JV-1080
- Years active: 1980–present
- Label: Bi.Ma. - Bilinski Production
- Website: https://bilinski.pl

Marek Biliński (born 17 May 1953 in Szczecin) is a Polish composer of electronic music.

== Career ==
He is an alumnus of the Academy of Music in Poznan (Music College in Poznan). He owes his popularity in the music market to his bestseller album "The Garden of the King of Dawn" and video "Escape From The Tropics", which was voted by TV audiences as the best clip of 1984. By then he had already been awarded a “Gold Disc" and had given many concerts in Poland and abroad (e.g. in Berlin, Hamburg, Bremen, Prague, Moscow and Kuwait). Moreover, he was awarded the first prize in Poland for the most popular multi-instrumentalist for five consecutive years (1981–1985).

For the next 4 years (1986–1990) he was a lecturer in the Academy of Music in Kuwait. At this period of time he created compositions with Arabic influences. The most well known composition in Poland that emerged from this period of time was the symphonic fantasia "Faces of the Desert". This composition was supposed to be used in the celebration of the 30th anniversary of Kuwait's independence, but the Iraqi invasion precluded realization of the event. After the Persian Gulf War, the "Faces of the Desert" (which was visualized by photos of artist-photographer Jacek Wozniak ) represented Kuwait on the Global Exhibition EXPO’92 in Seville, Spain.

After returning to Poland he regained his place in instrumental music. He transferred his earlier albums to compact discs. In 1994 he produced a new CD called "The Child of the Sun". Inspired by his music, choreographer Ewa Wycichowska created the ballet called “The Child of the Sun” which was performed by the Polish Theater of Dance. The premiere of this event took place in The Great Theater in Poznan at the end of November 1995. Among other performances, he presented a recital called "Music Tales" for TVP2 (Polish TV Station 2). As a composer, musician and juror he often takes part in radio and TV programs. His music appeared in cinema and television films (inter alias "Friend of Merry Devil" and "Close encounters with Merry Devil" directed by Jerzy Lukaszewicz.). Likewise his music was used in "The Wheel of Fortune" quiz show, in the Gala of the Polish Phonographic Industry Awards -"Fryderyk’96", "Fryderyk’97" and on CD-ROM discs in Poland and abroad, mainly in "The Minden Pictures Collection" in USA. In collaboration with another composer, Wojciech Trzcinski, Marek Bilinski had written the music for a drama, "Brother of Our God", written by Karol Wojtyla - present Pope John Paul II, and directed by Andrzej Marja Marczewski. Marek Bilinski was awarded as the best composer and virtuoso of synthesizers in 1995 in the Polish professional magazine "Music".

In 1998 he was commissioned to write a suite, "Reflection: I - Toscania, II - Loara, III - Bolero, IV - Seville", in celebration of the thirtieth anniversary of the artistic work of Agnieszka Duczmal and her Chamber Orchestra "Amadeus". This piece was composed for chamber orchestra and percussion and each movement bears the names of the places where the orchestra performed. The premiere of the suite occurred in November 1998 at the National Philharmonic in Warsaw. "Reflections" were received very enthusiastically by the audience. As the first in Poland and in this part of Europe, following the steps of Jean - Michel Jarre, he performed great outdoor concerts of music and light in Szczecin ('93) and Kraków ('94), which were viewed together by 50,000 spectators. Other Concerts of this type were the following:

In July 1996 during the Festival of Euro-Eko Meeting in Zlotów, Marek Bilinski presented a very unusual concert - " The Beginning of the Light", with international musicians: Hannibal Means (tenor)- USA, Sarhan Kubeisi (ethnic percussion instruments) - Syria, Edyta Kulczak (soprano)- Poland, Stanislaw Skoczynski (percussion instruments) - Poland and others. With laser, light and picture most of his important compositions were played at the concert. TVP1 recorded and showed the entire concert on September 1, 1996. It was recognized as one of the most interesting artistic events of the year. On March 12, 2000 in Gniezno he performed a concert, "Gniezno - 2000 - Sound - Fire - Light - Color", in honor of Five European Presidents Summit. Marek Bilinski shared the stage with Michal Grymuza, Wojciech Pilichowski, Michal Dabrówka, Piotr "Jackson" Wolski and others. They used the biggest drums in Europe for this occasion. The show was on live transmission by TVP1.

On June 21, 2003 in Old Town of Gdansk on the bank of Motlawa, he gave a multimedia performance, "St. John’s - Night". Marek Bilinski played with Piotr Cugowski, Marek Raduli, Mieczyslaw Jurecki, Mariusz "Fazi" Mielczarek, Tomasz Losowski, Ryszard Bazarnik, Krzysztof Krzyskow. The whole music program was embellished by the dancers on the boats. Marek Bilinski's compositions deduces from the best standards of classical and romantic music. His talent and knowledge unite tradition with vision of modern world sounds.

== Discography ==
=== Studio albums ===
- Ogród Króla świtu (eng. The Garden Of The King Of Dawn) - 1983, Wifon LP053
- E≠mc² - 1984, Polton LPP-010
- Wolne Loty (eng. Open Flights) - 1986, Polton LPP-026
- Ucieczka z Tropiku (eng. Escape from the Tropics) - 1987, Polton PC-029
- Dziecko Słońca (The Child of the Sun) - 1994
- Fire - 2008, Bi Ma
- Mały Książę (eng. The Little Prince) - 2010

=== Singles & EP ===
- „Fontanna radości” (eng. Fountain of Joy) / „Taniec w zaczarowanym gaju” (eng. Dancing in a magic grove)- 1982, Tonpress S460
- „Dom w Dolinie Mgieł” (eng. House In The Foggy Valley) / „Ucieczka z tropiku” (eng. Escape From The Tropics) - 1983, Tonpress S488
- Porachunki z bliźniakami (eng. Settle With Twins) - 1984, Polton MSP001
- „Kosmiczne opowiadania” (eng. Cosmic Tales) / „Gorące lato” (eng. Hot summer) - 1985, Tonpress S584
- Refleksje I-IV (1998)

=== Compilations ===
- Marek Biliński The Best of (1998)
- Best of the Best (2014)

=== Split ===
- Mabi Plays World Hits (1993)
