= Hazim Abdulridha =

Iraqi wrestler (born 1961)

Personal information
- Nationality: Iraqi
- Born: 1961
- Height: 1.60 m (5 ft 3 in)
- Weight: 52 kg (115 lb)

Sport
- Sport: Wrestling

Hazim Abdulrasool Abdulridha (Arabic: حازم عبد الرسول عبد الرضا, born 1961) is an Iraqi wrestler. He competed in the 1980 Summer Olympics.
