= Szczepan Biliński =

Zoologist, embryologist, cell biologist (born 1949)

- Born: 14 December 1949 (age 76)
- Occupations: zoologist, embryologist, cell biologist

Szczepan Biliński (born 14 December 1949) is a zoologist, embryologist, as well as cell and developmental biologist.

== Biography ==
In 1980 he obtained habilitation. In 2002 he was elected a member of the Polish Academy of Sciences. He was elected a member and secretary general of the Polish Academy of Arts and Sciences. From 1972 to 2021 he was employed at the Jagiellonian University. He supervised seven doctoral dissertations.
