= Riccardo Picchio =

Italian linguist (1923–2011)

- Born: Riccardo Picchio; 7 September 1923; Alessandria, Italy
- Died: 13 August 2011 (aged 87); New Haven, Connecticut, USA
- Other name: Riccardo Picchio
- Occupation: linguist
- Known for: Cyrillo-Methodian Studies
- Notable work: Slavia Orthodoxa. Literature and language.

Riccardo Picchio (1923-2011) is an Italian and Slavic linguist.

He graduated in Slavic Studies at the Sapienza University of Rome. In 1947 he was an editor in the magazine L'Avanti. For two years he taught Italian (1948–49) at the University of Warsaw, where, under the influence of Tadeusz Lehr-Spławiński, he focused on paleoslavistics and later specialized in Bulgarian at Paris under Roger Bernard and old Russian literature at Andre Mazon. Between 1953 and 1961 he was a professor at the Universities of Florence and Pisa, and then headed the Institute of Slavic Philology at the University of Rome, La Sapienza (1961–65). In 1965–1966 he was a visiting professor at Columbia University in New York, and beginning in 1968, for almost two decades, he was a professor of Slavic literature at Yale University in New Haven. When he returned to Italy in 1985, Riccardo Picchio became Professor of Russian, Church Slavonic and Bulgarian Literature at the University of Oriental Institute of Naples, where he retired in 1993.

He is the author of the concept "Slavia", which in the Middle Ages split into "Eastern Slavs" and "Western Slavs" - two simultaneously existing but developing cultures along different paths depending on the different geographical, linguistic and confessional areas to which also include the introduction of the terms "Slavia Orthodoxa" and "Slavia Latina" to mean them.
