= Stanisław Wróblewski =

Polish wrestler (1959–2019)

Stanisław Eugeniusz Wróblewski (13 September 1959 – 3 June 2019) was a Polish wrestler who competed at the 1980 Summer Olympics.

Wróblewski died on 3 June 2019 at the age of 59.
