= Finland at the 1980 Summer Olympics =

- IOC code: FIN
- NOC: Finnish Olympic Committee

in Moscow
- Competitors: 105 (99 men and 6 women) in 16 sports
- Flag bearer: Peter Tallberg
- Medals Ranked 12th: Gold 3 Silver 1 Bronze 4 Total 8

Summer Olympics appearances (overview)
- 1908; 1912; 1920; 1924; 1928; 1932; 1936; 1948; 1952; 1956; 1960; 1964; 1968; 1972; 1976; 1980; 1984; 1988; 1992; 1996; 2000; 2004; 2008; 2012; 2016; 2020; 2024

Other related appearances
- 1906 Intercalated Games

Finland competed at the 1980 Summer Olympics in Moscow, USSR. 105 competitors, 99 men and 6 women, took part in 71 events in 16 sports.

== Medalists ==
=== Gold ===
- Tomi Poikolainen — Archery, Men's Competition
- Pertti Karppinen — Rowing, Men's Single Sculls
- Esko Rechardt — Sailing, Men's Finn Competition

=== Silver ===
- Kaarlo Maaninka — Athletics, Men's 10.000 metres

=== Bronze ===
- Päivi Meriluoto — Archery, Women's Competition
- Kaarlo Maaninka — Athletics, Men's 5.000 metres
- Mikko Huhtala — Wrestling, Men's Greco-Roman Welterweight
- Jouko Lindgrén and Georg Tallberg — Sailing, Men's 470 Competition

== Archery ==
For the first time, Finland entered women in the Olympic archery competition. They were quite successful, with Päivi Meriluoto winning a bronze medal. The Finnish men, competing for the third time, both placed in the top eight as Tomi Poikolainen won Finland's first gold medal in archery. Kyösti Laasonen, who had competed in every Olympics since the reinstatement of archery, took seventh.

Women's Individual Competition:

- Päivi Meriluoto — 2.449 points (→ Bronze Medal)
- Capita Jussila — 2.298 points (→ 14th place)

Men's Individual Competition:

- Tomi Poikolainen — 2.455 points (→ Gold Medal)
- Kyösti Laasonen — 2.419 points (→ 7th place)

== Athletics ==
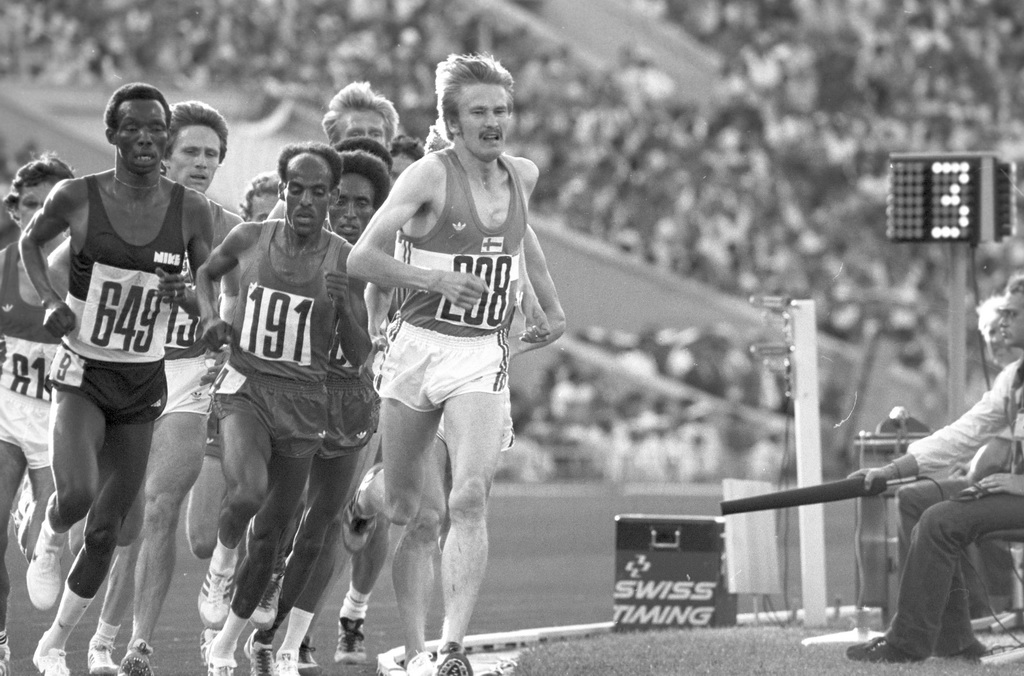
"5,000 m race" Kaarlo Maaninka

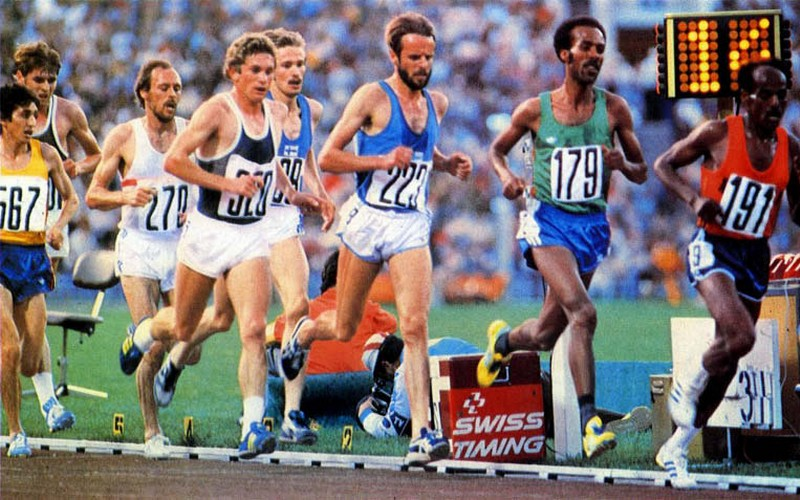
"10,000 m race" Lasse Virén

Men's 1,500 metres

- Antti Loikkanen
  - Heat — 3:40.5
  - Semifinals — 3:43.6 (→ did not advance)

Men's 5,000 metres

- Kaarlo Maaninka
  - Heat — 13:45.8
  - Semi Final — 13:40.2
  - Final — 13:22.0 (→ Bronze Medal)
- Martti Vainio
  - Heat — 13:45.2
  - Semi Final — 13:30.4
  - Final — 13:32.1 (→ 11th place)

Men's 10,000 metres

- Kaarlo Maaninka
  - Heat — 28:31.0
  - Final — 27:44.3 (→ Silver Medal)
- Lasse Virén
  - Heat — 28:45.8
  - Final — 27:50.5 (→ 5th place)
- Martti Vainio
  - Heat — 28:59.9
  - Final — 28:46.3 (→ 13th place)

Men's Marathon

- Håkan Spik
  - Final — 2:22:24 (→ 32nd place)
- Lasse Virén
  - Final — did not finish (→ no ranking)
- Jouni Kortelainen
  - Final — did not finish (→ no ranking)

Men's 110 m Hurdles

- Arto Bryggare
  - Heat — 13.77
  - Semifinals — 13.78
  - Final — 13.76 (→ 6th place)

Men's 3,000 m Steeplechase

- Tommy Ekblom
  - Heat — 8:27.8
  - Semifinals — 8:24.3
  - Final — 8:40.9 (→ 12th place)
- Vesa Laukkanen
  - Heat — 8:38.4
  - Semifinals — 8:33.3 (→ did not advance)

Men's 20 km Walk

- Reima Salonen
  - Final — 1:31:32.0 (→ 9th place)

Men's 50 km Walk

- Reima Salonen
  - Final — did not finish (→ no ranking)

Men's Long Jump

- Oli Pousi
  - Qualification — did not start (→ no ranking)

Men's Triple Jump

- Olli Pousi
  - Qualification — no mark (→ did not advance)

Men's Shot Put

- Reijo Ståhlberg
  - Qualification — 20.53 m
  - Final — 20.82 m (→ 4th place)

Men's Discus Throw

- Markku Tuokko
  - Qualification — 62.14 m
  - Final — 61.84 m (→ 9th place)

Men's Hammer Throw

- Harri Huhtala
  - Qualification — 72.46 m
  - Final Round — 71.96 m (→ 9th place)
- Juha Tiainen
  - Qualification — 70.82 m
  - Final Round — 71.38 m (→ 10th place)

Men's Javelin Throw

- Antero Puranen
  - Qualification — 84.02 m
  - Final — 86.15 m (→ 5th place)
- Pentti Sinersaari
  - Qualification — 80.30 m
  - Final — 84.34 m (→ 6th place)
- Aimo Aho
  - Qualification — 82.12 m
  - Final — 80.58 m (→ 9th place)

Men's Pole Vault

- Tapani Haapakoski
  - Qualification — 5.40 m
  - Final — 5.45 m (→ 9th place)
- Rauli Pudas
  - Qualification — 5.35 m
  - Final — 5.25 m (→ 12th place)
- Antti Kalliomäki
  - Qualification — no mark (→ did not advance)

Men's Decathlon

- Esa Jokinen
  - Final — 7826 points (→ 9th place)
- Johannes Lahti
  - Final — 7765 points (→ 11th place)

Women's 100 metres

- Helinä Laihorinne
  - Heat — 11.70
  - Quarterfinals — did not finish (→ did not advance)

Women's Discus Throw

- Ulla Lundholm
  - Qualification — DNS (→ did not advance)

Women's Javelin Throw

- Tiina Lillak
  - Qualification — 56.26 m (→ did not advance)

== Boxing ==
Men's Light Flyweight (– 48 kg)

- Antti Juntumaa
  - First Round — Defeated Beruk Asfaw (Ethiopia) after knock-out in first round
  - Second Round — Lost to Dumitru Şchiopu (Romania) on points (1-4)

Men's Bantamweight (– 54 kg)

- Veli Koota
  - First Round — Bye
  - Second Round — Defeated Fazlija Sacirovic (Yugoslavia) after referee stopped contest in second round
  - Third Round — Lost to Bernardo Piñango (Venezuela) after diskwalification in second round

Men's Featherweight (– 57 kg)

- Hannu Kaislama
  - First Round — Lost to Rudi Fink (East Germany) on points (0-5)

Men's Welterweight (– 67 kg)

- Martti Marjamaa
  - First Round — Defeated Roland Omoruyi (Nigeria) on points (5-0)
  - Second Round — Lost to Ionel Budusan (Romania) after referee stopped contest in third round

Men's Middleweight (– 75 kg)

- Tarmo Uusivirta
  - First Round — Bye
  - Second Round — Lost to Jerzy Rybicki (Poland) after referee stopped contest in second round

== Cycling ==
Five cyclists represented Finland in 1980.

Individual road race

- Harry Hannus
- Kari Puisto
- Mauno Uusivirta
- Sixten Wackström

Team time trial

- Harry Hannus
- Kari Puisto
- Patrick Wackström
- Sixten Wackström

Individual pursuit

- Sixten Wackström

Men's sprint

- Paul Ahokas

== Fencing ==
Five fencers, all men, represented Finland in 1980.

Men's épée

- Heikki Hulkkonen
- Mikko Salminen
- Peder Planting

Men's team épée

- Heikki Hulkkonen, Kimmo Puranen, Peter Grönholm, Peder Planting, Mikko Salminen

== Football ==
Men's Team Competition

- Preliminary Round (Group D)
  - Lost to Yugoslavia (0-2)
  - Drew with Iraq (0-0)
  - Defeated Costa Rica (3-0)
- Quarter Finals
  - Did not qualify
- Team Roster
  - Olli Isoaho
  - Aki Lahtinen
  - Juha Helin
  - Kari Virtanen
  - Hannu Turunen
  - Juha Dahllund
  - Vesa Pulliainen
  - Juhani Himanka
  - Ari Tissari
  - Jouko Alila
  - Jouko Kataja
  - Teuvo Vilen
  - Raimo Kuuluvainen
  - Tomi Jalo
  - Jouko Soini
  - Juha Rissanen

== Modern pentathlon ==
Three male pentathletes represented Finland in 1980.

Men's Individual Competition:

- Heikki Hulkkonen — 5227 pts, 10th place
- Jussi Pelli — 5032 pts, 24th place
- Pekka Santanen — 4828 pts, 31st place

Men's Team Competition:

- Hulkkonen, Pelli, and Santanen — 15.087 pts, 7th place

== Swimming ==
Men's 100m Breaststroke

- Martti Järventaus

Men's 200m Breaststroke

- Martti Järventaus
