= Finland at the 1972 Summer Olympics =

- IOC code: FIN
- NOC: Finnish Olympic Committee

in Munich, West Germany August 26-September 10, 1972
- Competitors: 96 (89 men and 7 women) in 16 sports
- Flag bearer: Ilkka Nummisto
- Medals Ranked 14th: Gold 3 Silver 1 Bronze 4 Total 8

Summer Olympics appearances (overview)
- 1908; 1912; 1920; 1924; 1928; 1932; 1936; 1948; 1952; 1956; 1960; 1964; 1968; 1972; 1976; 1980; 1984; 1988; 1992; 1996; 2000; 2004; 2008; 2012; 2016; 2020; 2024

Other related appearances
- 1906 Intercalated Games

Finland competed at the 1972 Summer Olympics in Munich, West Germany. 96 competitors, 89 men and 7 women, took part in 75 events in 16 sports.

== Medalists ==
Finland finished in 14th position in the final medal rankings, with three gold medals and eight medals overall.

=== Gold ===
- Pekka Vasala — Athletics, Men's 1,500m
- Lasse Virén — Athletics, Men's 5,000m
- Lasse Virén — Athletics, Men's 10,000m

=== Silver ===
- Reima Virtanen — Boxing, Men's Middleweight

=== Bronze ===
- Tapio Kantanen — Athletics, Men's 3,000m Steeplechase
- Kyösti Laasonen — Archery, Men's Individual Competition
- Risto Hurme, Veikko Salminen, and Martti Ketelä — Modern Pentathlon, Men's Team Competition
- Risto Björlin — Wrestling, Men's Greco-Roman Bantamweight

== Archery ==
In the first modern archery competition at the Olympics, Finland entered three men. They won a bronze medal.

Men's Individual Competition:

- Kyösti Laasonen — 2467 points (→ Bronze Medal)
- Olavi Laurila — 2372 points (→ 20th place)
- Jorma Sandelin — 2278 points (→ 40th place)

== Athletics ==
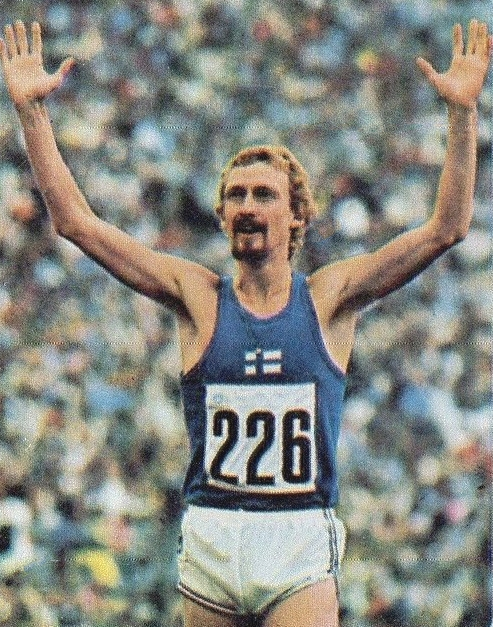
Pekka Vasala was Men's 1500 metres winner

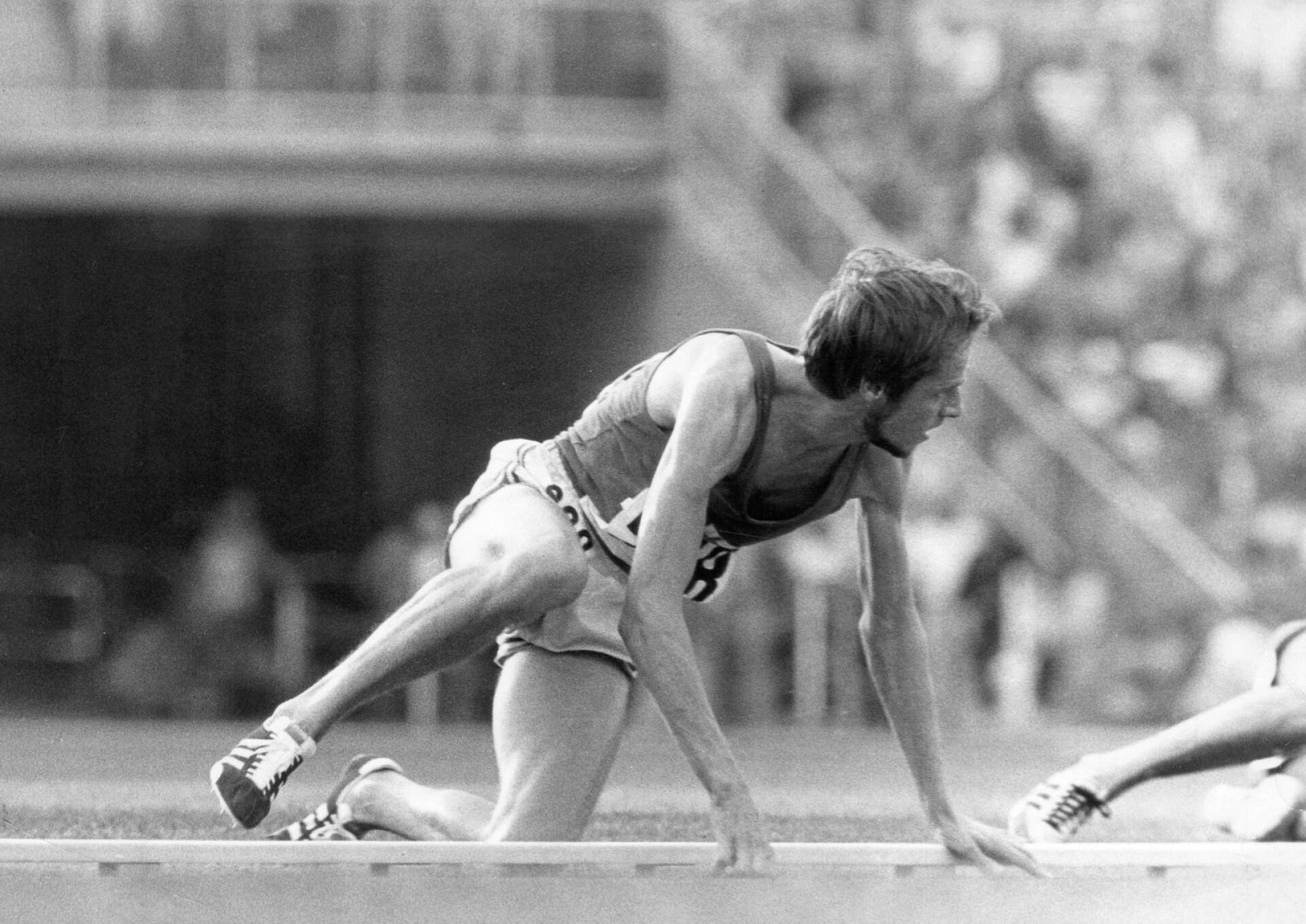
Lasse Virén when he fell during the 10,000 meters competition

Men's 100 metres

- Antti Rajamäki
  - First Heat — 10.52s (→ did not advance)
- Raimo Vilen
  - First Heat — 11.00s (→ did not advance)

Men's 1500 metres

- Pekka Vasala
  - Heat — 3:40.9
  - Semifinals — 3:37.9
  - Final — 3:36.3 (→ Gold Medal)
- Pekka Päivärinta
  - Heat — 3:40.9
  - Semifinals — 3:45.1 (→ did not advance)

Men's 5000 metres

- Tapio Kantanen
  - Heat — 13:42.0 (→ did not advance)

Men's 4 × 100 m Relay

- Antti Rajamäki, Raimo Vilen, Erik Gustafsson, and Markku Juhola
  - Heat — 39.54s
  - Semifinals — 39.30s (NR) (→ did not advance)

== Boxing ==
Men's Light Middleweight (– 71 kg)

- Mikko Saarinen
  - First Round — Bye
  - Second Round — Defeated David Attan (KEN), TKO-2
  - Third Round — Lost to Peter Tiepold (GDR), 0:5

== Cycling ==
Six cyclists represented Finland in 1972.

Individual road race

- Harry Hannus — did not finish (→ no ranking)
- Mauno Uusivirta — did not finish (→ no ranking)
- Tapani Vuorenhela — did not finish (→ no ranking)
- Ole Wackström — did not finish (→ no ranking)

Team time trial

- Kalevi Eskelinen
- Harry Hannus
- Mauno Uusivirta
- Ole Wackström

Team individual pursuit

- Raimo Suikkanen

== Diving ==
Men's 3m Springboard:

- Pentti Koskinen — 336.99 points (15th place)

Women's 3m Springboard:

- Laura Kivelä — 236.25 points (24th place)

Women's 10m Platform:

- Laura Kivelä — 172.65 points (22nd place)

== Fencing ==
One fencer represented Finland in 1972.

Men's épée

- Risto Hurme

== Modern pentathlon ==
Three male pentathletes represented Finland in 1972, with them winning bronze in the team event.

Men's Individual Competition:

- Risto Hurme — 5094 points (→ 8th place)
- Veikko Salminen — 4852 points (→ 17th place)
- Martti Ketelä — 4849 points (→ 19th place)

Men's Team Competition:

- Hurme, Salminen, and Ketelä — 14812 points (→ Bronze Medal)

== Rowing ==
Men's Coxed Pairs

- Leo Ahonen, Leif Anderson and Antero Yli-lkkelä
  - Heat — 8:06.56
  - Repechage — 8:11.89 (→ did not advance)

== Shooting ==
Ten male shooters represented Finland in 1972.

25 m pistol

- Immo Huhtinen
- Seppo Mäkinen

50 m pistol

- Seppo Irjala
- Immo Huhtinen

300 m rifle, three positions

- Jaakko Minkkinen
- Osmo Ala-Honkola

50 m rifle, three positions

- Esa Kervinen
- Jaakko Minkkinen

50 m rifle, prone

- Jaakko Asikainen
- Esa Kervinen

50 m running target

- Pekka Suomela
- Paavo Mikkonen

Skeet

- Ari Westergård
