= Finland at the 1968 Summer Olympics =

- IOC code: FIN
- NOC: Finnish Olympic Committee

in Mexico City
- Competitors: 66 (60 men and 6 women) in 13 sports
- Flag bearer: Pentti Linnosvuo
- Medals Ranked 24th: Gold 1 Silver 2 Bronze 1 Total 4

Summer Olympics appearances (overview)
- 1908; 1912; 1920; 1924; 1928; 1932; 1936; 1948; 1952; 1956; 1960; 1964; 1968; 1972; 1976; 1980; 1984; 1988; 1992; 1996; 2000; 2004; 2008; 2012; 2016; 2020; 2024; 2028

Other related appearances
- 1906 Intercalated Games

Finland competed at the 1968 Summer Olympics in Mexico City, Mexico. 66 competitors, 60 men and 6 women, took part in 61 events in 13 sports.

== Medalists ==
=== Gold ===
- Kaarlo Kangasniemi – Weightlifting, Men's Middle Heavyweight

=== Silver ===
- Jorma Kinnunen – Athletics, Men's Javelin Throw
- Olli Laiho – Gymnastics, Men's Pommeled Horse

=== Bronze ===
- Arto Nilsson – Boxing, Men's Light Welterweight

== Boxing ==
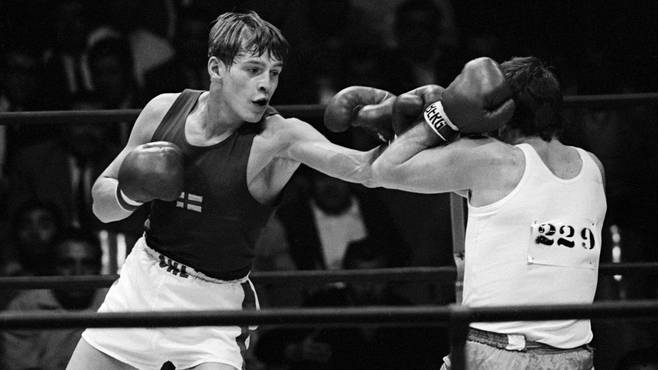
Arto Nilsson – Jerzy Kulej

== Cycling ==
Four cyclists represented Finland in 1968.

Individual road race

- Raimo Honkanen
- Mauno Uusivirta
- Ole Wackström
- Raimo Suikkanen

Team time trial

- Mauno Uusivirta
- Ole Wackström
- Raimo Honkanen
- Raimo Suikkanen

1000m time trial

- Raimo Suikkanen

Individual pursuit

- Ole Wackström

== Diving ==
Men

Athlete	Event	Preliminary		Final			
Athlete	Event	Points	Rank	Points	Rank	Total	Rank
Pentti Koskinen	3 m springboard	95.99	8 Q	41.81	12	137.80	12

Women

Athlete	Event	Preliminary		Final			
Athlete	Event	Points	Rank	Points	Rank	Total	Rank
Tarja Liljeström	3 m springboard	81.80	14	Did not advance			
Tarja Liljeström	10 m platform	46.39	17	Did not advance			

== Modern pentathlon ==
Three male pentathletes represented Finland in 1968.

Individual:

- Seppo Aho – 4497 points (18th place)
- Martti Ketelä – 4446 points (20th place)
- Jorma Hotanen – 4231 points (34th place)

Team:

- Aho, Ketelä, and Hotanen – 13238 points (5th place)

== Shooting ==
Nine shooters, all men, represented Finland in 1968.

25 m pistol

- Pentti Linnosvuo
- Immo Huhtinen

50 m pistol

- Matti Patteri
- Seppo Saarenpää

300 m rifle, three positions

- Juhani Laakso
- Osmo Ala-Honkola

50 m rifle, three positions

- Simo Morri
- Jaakko Minkkinen

50 m rifle, prone

- Jaakko Minkkinen
- Simo Morri

Skeet

- Tuukka Mäkelä

== Wrestling ==
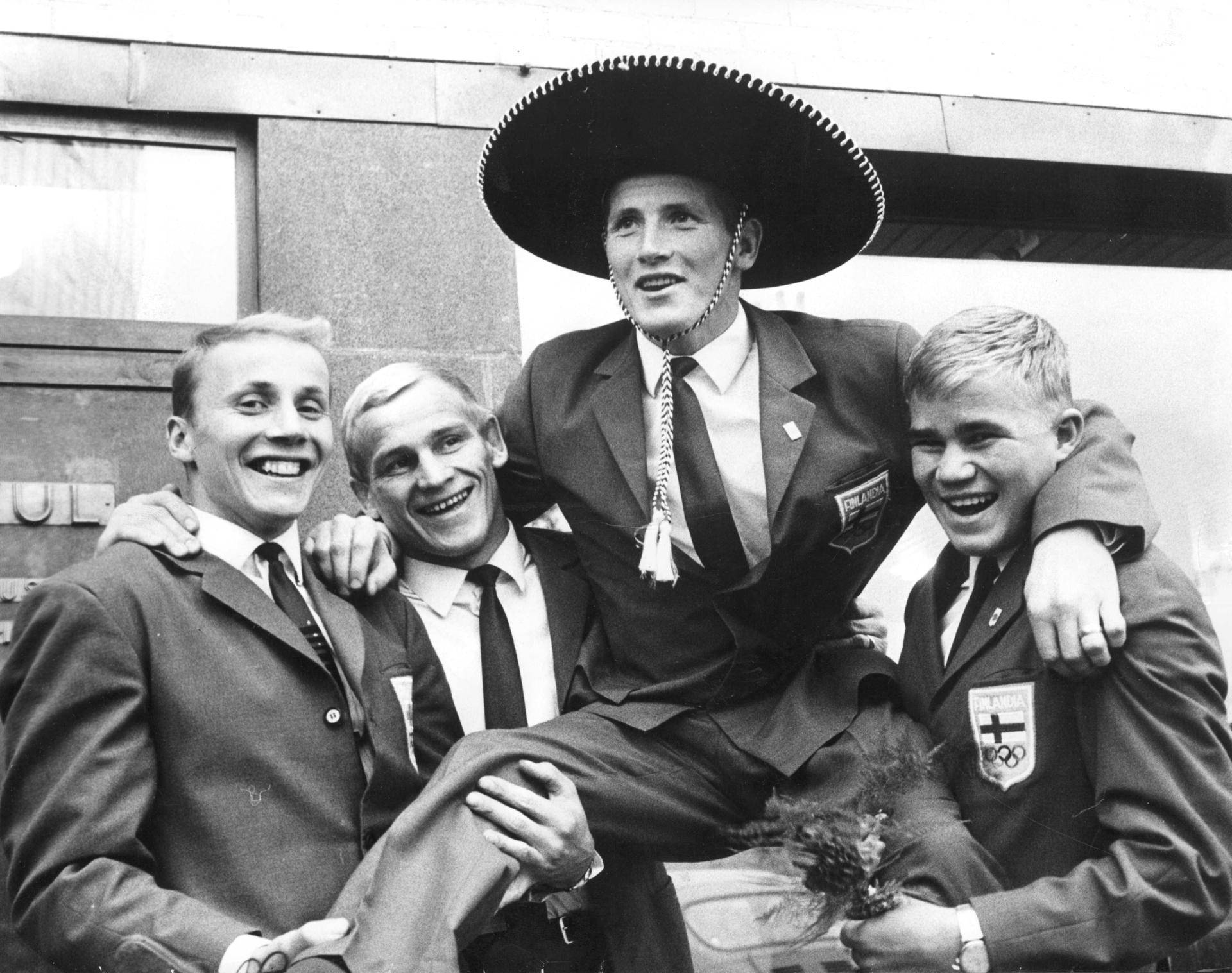
Four Finnish wrestlers Lasse Laine, Eero Tapio, Martti Laakso and Kari Meronen

== See also ==
- Finland at the 1968 Summer Paralympics
