= Finland at the 1984 Summer Olympics =

- IOC code: FIN
- NOC: Finnish Olympic Committee

in Los Angeles, United States July 28, 1984 – August 12, 1984
- Competitors: 86 (73 men, 13 women) in 15 sports
- Flag bearer: Esko Rechardt (sailing)
- Medals Ranked 15th: Gold 4 Silver 2 Bronze 6 Total 12

Summer Olympics appearances (overview)
- 1908; 1912; 1920; 1924; 1928; 1932; 1936; 1948; 1952; 1956; 1960; 1964; 1968; 1972; 1976; 1980; 1984; 1988; 1992; 1996; 2000; 2004; 2008; 2012; 2016; 2020; 2024

Other related appearances
- 1906 Intercalated Games

Finland competed at the 1984 Summer Olympics in Los Angeles, California, United States. 86 competitors, 73 men and 13 women, took part in 76 events in 15 sports.

== Medalists ==
Medal	Name	Sport	Event	Date
Gold	Jouko Salomäki	Wrestling	Men's Greco-Roman 74 kg	3 August
Gold	Pertti Karppinen	Rowing	Men's single sculls	5 August
Gold	Arto Härkönen	Athletics	Men's javelin throw	5 August
Gold	Juha Tiainen	Athletics	Men's hammer throw	6 August
Silver	Tapio Sipilä	Wrestling	Men's Greco-Roman 68 kg	3 August
Silver	Tiina Lillak	Athletics	Women's javelin throw	6 August
Bronze	Jouni Grönman	Weightlifting	Men's 67.5 kg	1 August
Bronze	Rauno Bies	Shooting	Men's 25 metre rapid fire pistol	2 August
Bronze	Pekka Niemi	Weightlifting	Men's 100 kg	6 August
Bronze	Arto Bryggare	Athletics	Men's 110 metres hurdles	6 August
Bronze	Joni Nyman	Boxing	Men's welterweight	9 August
Bronze	Jukka Rauhala	Wrestling	Men's freestyle 68 kg	11 August

== Archery ==
Defending gold medallist Tomi Poikolainen bettered his performance of four years earlier by one point, but with the return of the United States and Japan, Poikolainen's score was no longer sufficient to earn a medal and he fell to fifth place. Much the same fate befell Päivi Meriluoto, who fell two places even though she shot 60 points better than she had in 1980.

Kyösti Laasonen, in his fourth Olympic archery competition, took 28th place.

Women's Individual Competition:

- Päivi Meriluoto — 2509 points (→ 5th place)
- Ama Rantal — 2460 points (→ 15th place)

Men's Individual Competition:

- Tomi Poikolainen — 2538 points (→ 5th place)
- Kyösti Laasonen — 2443 points (→ 28th place)
- Markku Syrjälä — 2333 points (→ 49th place)

== Athletics ==
Men's 1,500 metres

- Antti Loikkanen
  - Qualifying Heat — did not finish (→ did not advance, no ranking)

Men's 5,000 metres

- Martti Vainio
  - Heat — 13:45.16
  - Semifinals — 13:30.48 (→ did not advance)
- Antti Loikkanen
  - Heat — 13:51.47
  - Semifinals — 13:58.74 (→ did not advance)

Men's 10,000 metres

- Martti Vainio
  - Qualifying Heat — 28:19.25
  - Final — finished in second place (27:51.10), but was later disqualified for the use of several performance-enhancing drugs

Men's Marathon

- Pertti Tiainen — 2:17:43 (→ 27th place)
- Martti Vainio — did not finish (→ no ranking)

Men's 110 metres Hurdles

- Arto Bryggare

Men's 3,000 metres Steeplechase

- Tommy Ekblom

Men's High Jump

- Erkki Niemi
  - Qualification — 2.24m
  - Final — 2.24m (→ 9th place)

Men's Pole Vault

- Kimmo Pallonen
  - Qualifying Round — 5.40m
  - Final — 5.45m (→ 5th place)

Men's Javelin Throw

- Arto Härkönen
  - Qualification — 83.06m
  - Final — 86.76m (→ Gold Medal)
- Raimo Manninen
  - Qualification — 79.26m (→ did not advance, 13th place)
- Tero Saviniemi
  - Qualification — 76.46m (→ did not advance, 17th place)

Men's Shot Put

- Aulis Akonniemi
  - Qualifying Round — 19.38 m
  - Final — 18.98 m (→ 9th place)

Men's Hammer Throw

- Juha Tiainen
  - Qualification — 72.68m
  - Final — 78.08m (→ Gold Medal)
- Harri Huhtala
  - Qualification — 73.78m
  - Final — 75.28m (→ 6th place)

Men's 20 km Walk

- Reima Salonen
  - Final — did not start (→ no ranking)

Men's 50 km Walk

- Reima Salonen
  - Final — 3:58:30 (→ 4th place)

Women's 100 metres

- Helinä Laihorinne-Marjamaa

Women's 200 metres

- Helinä Laihorinne-Marjamaa

Women's Marathon

- Tujia Toivonen
  - Final — 2:32:07 (→ 10th place)
- Sinikka Keskitalo
  - Final — 2:35:15 (→ 15th place)

Women's 400m Hurdles

- Tuija Helander
  - Heat — 57.22
  - Semifinal — 56.59
  - Final — 56.55 (→ 7th place)

Women's Discus Throw

- Ulla Lundholm
  - Qualification — 56.44m
  - Final — 62.84m (→ 4th place)

Women's Javelin Throw

- Tiina Lillak
  - Qualification — 63.30m
  - Final — 69.00m (→ Silver Medal)
- Tuula Laaksalo
  - Qualification — 60.42m
  - Final — 66.40m (→ 4th place)
- Helena Laine
  - Qualification — 61.80m
  - Final — 58.18m (→ 11th place)

== Boxing ==
Men's Bantamweight (– 54 kg)

- Jarmo Eskelinen
  - First Round — Defeated Yao Gaitor (Togo), 5-0
  - Second Round — Lost to Juan Molina (Puerto Rico), 0-5

== Cycling ==
Five cyclists represented Finland in 1984.

Individual road race

- Kari Myyryläinen
- Harry Hannus
- Patrick Wackström
- Harri Hedgren

Team time trial

- Harry Hannus
- Kari Myyryläinen
- Patrick Wackström
- Sixten Wackström

Individual pursuit

- Sixten Wackström

== Diving ==
Men's 3m Springboard

- Juha Ovaskainen
  - Preliminary Round — 532.17
  - Final — 548.55 (→ 11th place)

== Modern pentathlon ==
Three male pentathletes represented Finland in 1984.

Individual

- Pasi Hulkkonen
- Jorma Korpela
- Jussi Pelli

Team

- Pasi Hulkkonen
- Jorma Korpela
- Jussi Pelli

== Swimming ==
Men's 100m Breaststroke

- Martti Järventaus
  - Heat — 1:06.21 (→ did not advance, 29th place)

Men's 200m Breaststroke

- Martti Järventaus
  - Heat — 2:26.96 (→ did not advance, 27th place)

Women's 100m Freestyle

- Maarit Sihvonen-Vähäsaari
  - Heat — 58.51 (→ did not advance, 18th place)

Women's 200m Individual Medley

- Maarit Sihvonen-Vähäsaari
  - Heat — 2:21.05
  - B-Final — 2:19.27 (→ 9th place)
