= Skytta (disambiguation) =

Skytta is a village in Norway.

Skytta or Skyttä may also refer to:

== People ==
- Esa Skyttä, Finnish former racing cyclist
- Mika Skyttä (born 1973), Finnish ice hockey player
- Naatan Skyttä (born 2002), Finnish footballer
