= Liias =

Liias is a surname. Notable people with the surname include:

- Marko Liias (born 1981), American politician
- Toni Liias (born 1986), Finnish racing cyclist

== See also ==
- Liia (given name)
