= Liia =

Liia may refer to:

- Liia, an Estonian feminine given name
- Liia, an island in Estonia
- 5411 Liia, an asteroid
- Local independence of irrelevant alternatives in decision theory
- The LIIA, the acronym for the Latvian Institute of International Affairs
