= Törmänen (surname) =

Törmänen is a Finnish surname. Notable people with the surname include:

- Veikko Törmänen (born 1945), Finnish artist
- Jouko Törmänen (1954–2013), Finnish ski jumper
- Antti Törmänen (born 1970), Finnish professional ice hockey player
- Antti Törmänen (Go player) (born 1989), Finnish professional Go player
- Rosa Törmänen (born 1992), Finnish racing cyclist
