= Henttala =

Henttala is a Finnish surname. Notable people with the surname include:

- Joonas Henttala (born 1991), Finnish racing cyclist
- Lotta Henttala (born 1989), Finnish racing cyclist
