= Suikkanen =

Suikkanen is a Finnish surname. Notable people with the surname include:

- Raimo Suikkanen (1942–2021), Finnish cyclist
- Kai Suikkanen (born 1959), Finnish ice hockey player and coach
