= Uusivirta =

Uusivirta is a surname. Notable people with the surname include:

- Mauno Uusivirta (born 1948), Finnish racing cyclist
- Olavi Uusivirta (born 1983), Finnish singer, songwriter, and actor
- Tarmo Uusivirta (1957–1999), Finnish boxer
