= Hulkkonen =

Hulkkonen is a Finnish surname. Notable people with the surname include:

- Heikki Hulkkonen (born 1955), Finnish modern pentathlete and fencer
- Jori Hulkkonen (born 1973), Finnish musician and DJ
- Pasi Hulkkonen (born 1961), Finnish modern pentathlete
