= 2002 UCI Track Cycling World Championships – Women's points race =

Rainbow jersey

The women's points race was one of the 6 women's events at the 2002 UCI Track Cycling World Championships, held in Copenhagen, Denmark.

20 cyclists from 20 countries participated in the race. Because of the number of entries, there were no qualification rounds for this discipline. Consequently, the event was run direct to the final.

== Final ==
The final and only race was run at 26:25 on September 28. The competition consisted on 100 laps, making a total of 25 km with 10 sprints.

Elapsed time=33:51.700
Average speed=44.297 km/h

Rank	Name	Country	Sprint number										Finish order	Lap points			Total points
Rank	Name	Country	1	2	3	4	5	6	7	8	9	10	Finish order	+	–	Balance	Total points
	Olga Slyusareva	Russia		5		3	1	2	3	5	2	5					27
	Lada Kozlíková	Czech Republic	1		2									20		20	23
	Vera Carrara	Italy												20		20	20
4	Lyudmyla Vypyraylo	Ukraine			5		2		5			3					15
5	Katherine Bates	Australia	2	5		3		2									12
6	Gema Pascual Torrecilla	Spain		3	1	2		3	2								11
7	María Luisa Calle	Colombia		2							5						7
8	Anke Wichmann	Germany	3				1	1		1							6
9	Belem Guerrero	Mexico					5										5
10	Cathy Moncassin	France				1					3						4
11	Mette Andreasen	Denmark		1						2		1					4
12	Joanne Marie Kiesanowski	New Zealand								3							3
13	Sarah Uhl	United States							1		2						3
14	Mandy Poitras	Canada										2					2
15	Edita Kubelskienė	Lithuania															0
15	Eleftheria Ellinikaki	Greece															0
17	Adrie Visser	Netherlands															0
18	Evelyn García	El Salvador															0
19	Maaria Siren	Finland															0
DNF	Sara Symington	United Kingdom															
