= Laakajärvi =

- Location within Finland
- Location: Sonkajärvi, Sotkamo and Kajaani
- Coordinates: 63°50′N 27°55′E
- Type: Lake
- Primary outflows: via Nurmijoki river and lake Sälevä to the lake Syväri
- Catchment area: Vuoksi
- Basin countries: Finland
- Max. length: 20 km (12 mi)
- Surface area: 34.678 km^{2} (13.389 sq mi)
- Average depth: 7.4 m (24 ft)
- Max. depth: 25 m (82 ft)
- Shore length^{1}: 84.78 km (52.68 mi)
- Surface elevation: 164.4 m (539 ft)
- ^{1} Shore length is not a well-defined measure.

Laakajärvi is medium-sized lake in the Vuoksi main catchment area. It is located in Sonkajärvi, Sotkamo and Kajaani municipalities, in the regions of Northern Savonia and Kainuu in Finland. The lake is just over 20 km long and relatively narrow. It is the biggest lake in Sonkajärvi municipality.

The lake is situated only a few kilometers from nickel mines of the Talvivaara Mining Company. The nature protection movements are worried that the mining can damage the lake.

== See also ==
- List of lakes in Finland
