= Ahlroos =

Ahlroos is a Finnish surname. It may refer to:

- Frans Ahlroos (1867–1948), Finnish typesetter, journalist, politician, member of Parliament of Finland 1907 to 1909
- Kim Ahlroos (born 1971), Finnish ice hockey player
- Sirpa Ahlroos-Kouko (born 1975), Finnish racing cyclist
