= Jaakko Hänninen =

Finnish cyclist

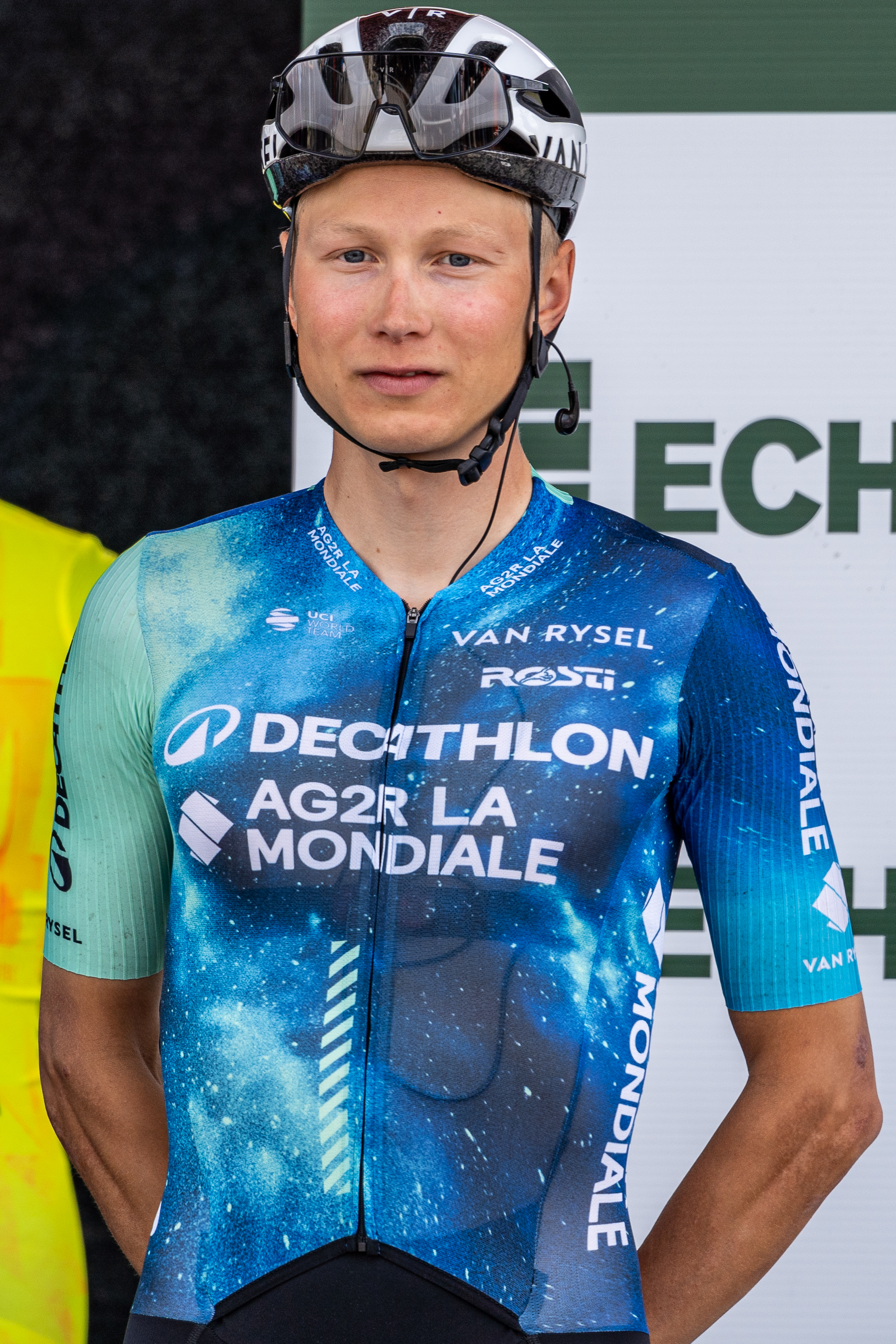
- Hänninen in 2024

Personal information
- Born: 16 April 1997 (age 29) Ruokolahti, Finland
- Height: 1.77 m (5 ft 10 in)
- Weight: 59 kg (130 lb)

Cycling career
- Sport: Cycling
- Current team: Nice Métropole Côte d'Azur
- Discipline: Road
- Role: Rider

Amateur teams
- 2016: TWD–Länken
- 2017: AC Bisontine
- 2018–2019: Probikeshop Saint-Étienne Loire

Professional teams
- 2019–2024: AG2R La Mondiale
- 2025–: Nice Métropole Côte d'Azur

Major wins
- One-day races and Classics National Road Race Championships (2024)
Medal record
Representing Finland
Men's road bicycle racing
World Championships
Bronze medal – third place	2018 Innsbruck	Under-23 road race

Jaakko Hänninen (born 16 April 1997) is a Finnish cyclist, who currently rides for UCI Continental team Nice Métropole Côte d'Azur. He previously spent five seasons with UCI WorldTeam Decathlon–AG2R La Mondiale. Having competed for French amateur teams from 2016, Hänninen joined AG2R La Mondiale in August 2019. In October 2020, he was named in the startlist for the 2020 Giro d'Italia.

== Major results ==
2015
National Junior Road Championships

1st Road race
1st Time trial

2017
National Under-23 Road Championships

1st Road race
1st Time trial

2nd Road race, National Road Championships
2018
1st Tour du Gévaudan Occitanie
3rd Road race, UCI Road World Under-23 Championships
8th Scandinavian Race Uppsala
2019
4th Tour du Doubs
2021
10th Mercan'Tour Classic Alpes-Maritimes
2022
4th Overall Tour de l'Ain
2024 (1 pro win)
1st Road race, National Road Championships

=== Grand Tour general classification results timeline ===
Grand Tour	2020	2021	2022
Giro d'Italia	73	—	90
Tour de France	—	—	—
Vuelta a España	—	—	DNF

Legend
—	Did not compete
DNF	Did not finish
IP	Race in Progress
