= Anders Bäckman =

Finnish cyclist

Personal information
- Born: 8 October 1985 (age 41)

Cycling career
- Sport: Cycling
- Discipline: Road
- Role: Rider

Anders Bäckman (born 8 October 1985) is a Finnish cyclist. He won the Finnish National Road Race Championships in 2018 and 2022.

== Major results ==
2018
1st Road race, National Road Championships

2022
1st Road race, National Road Championships
