= Oscar Stenström =

Finnish cyclist

Personal information
- Full name: Oscar Stenström
- Born: 24 April 1978
- Died: 8 February 2015 (aged 36)

Cycling career
- Sport: Cycling
- Role: Rider

Oscar Stenström (24 April 1978 – 8 February 2015) was a Finnish racing cyclist. He finished in second place in the Finnish National Road Race Championships in 2004.
