= Laura Vainionpää =

Finnish cyclist

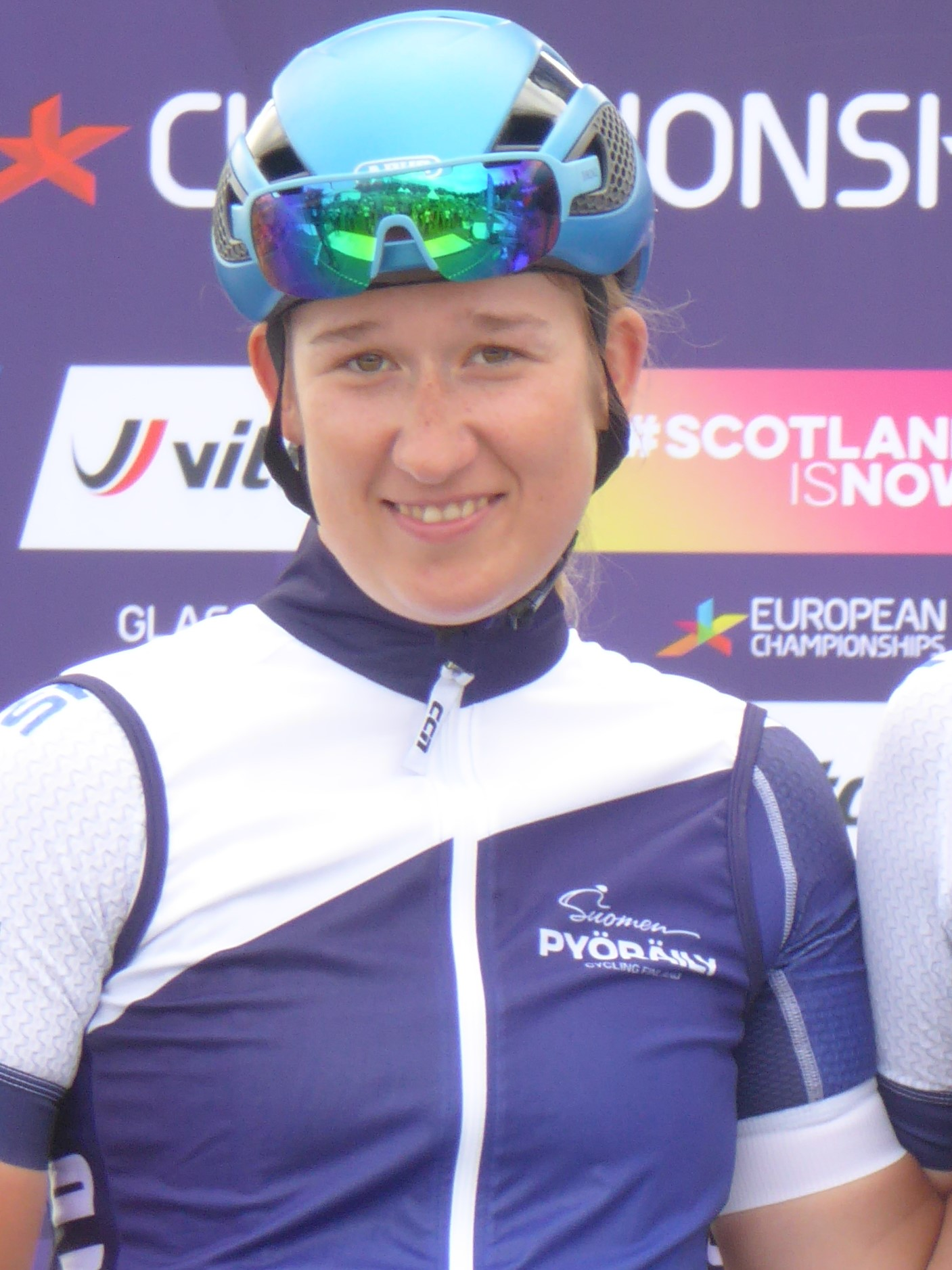
- Vainionpää at the 2018 European Road Cycling Championships.

Personal information
- Full name: Laura Vainionpää
- Born: 11 April 1994 (age 32): Jurva, Finland; (now Kurikka)

Cycling career
- Sport: Cycling
- Current team: S-Bikes–Doltcini
- Discipline: Road
- Role: Rider

Amateur teams
- 2014: Team Medilaseria
- 2014: Kauhajoki Karhua
- 2015–2017: Isorex Ladies
- 2019–: S-Bikes Bodhi Cycling

Professional team
- 2018: Health Mate–Cyclelive Team

Laura Vainionpää (born 11 April 1994) is a Finnish racing cyclist, who rides for Belgian amateur team S-Bikes–Doltcini. She rode in the women's road race at the UCI Road World Championships in 2016 and 2017, but she did not finish on either occasion.

Prior to her cycling career, Vainionpää was also a member of the Finland women's national under-18 ice hockey team at the 2012 IIHF World Women's U18 Championship, playing at forward.

== Personal life ==
Her father Arto Vainionpää and brother Oskari Vainionpää are also road cyclists.

== Major results ==
2014
National Road Championships

3rd Time trial
3rd Road race

2015
2nd Road race, National Road Championships
2016
2nd Road race, National Road Championships
2017
3rd Time trial, National Road Championships
2018
National Road Championships

4th Road race
5th Time trial

2019
4th Road race, National Road Championships
2022
2nd Road race, National Road Championships
3rd Everberg (WCS)
7th Overall Tour of Uppsala
10th Ladies Tour of Estonia
