= Jari Lähde =

Finnish cyclist

Personal information
- Full name: Jari Lähde
- Born: 8 February 1963 (age 63) Nokia, Finland

Cycling career
- Sport: Cycling
- Role: Rider

Jari Juhani Lähde (born 8 February 1963) is a Finnish former racing cyclist. He won the Finnish national road race title in 1988. He also competed at the 1988 Summer Olympics.
