= Anna Lindström =

Finnish cyclist

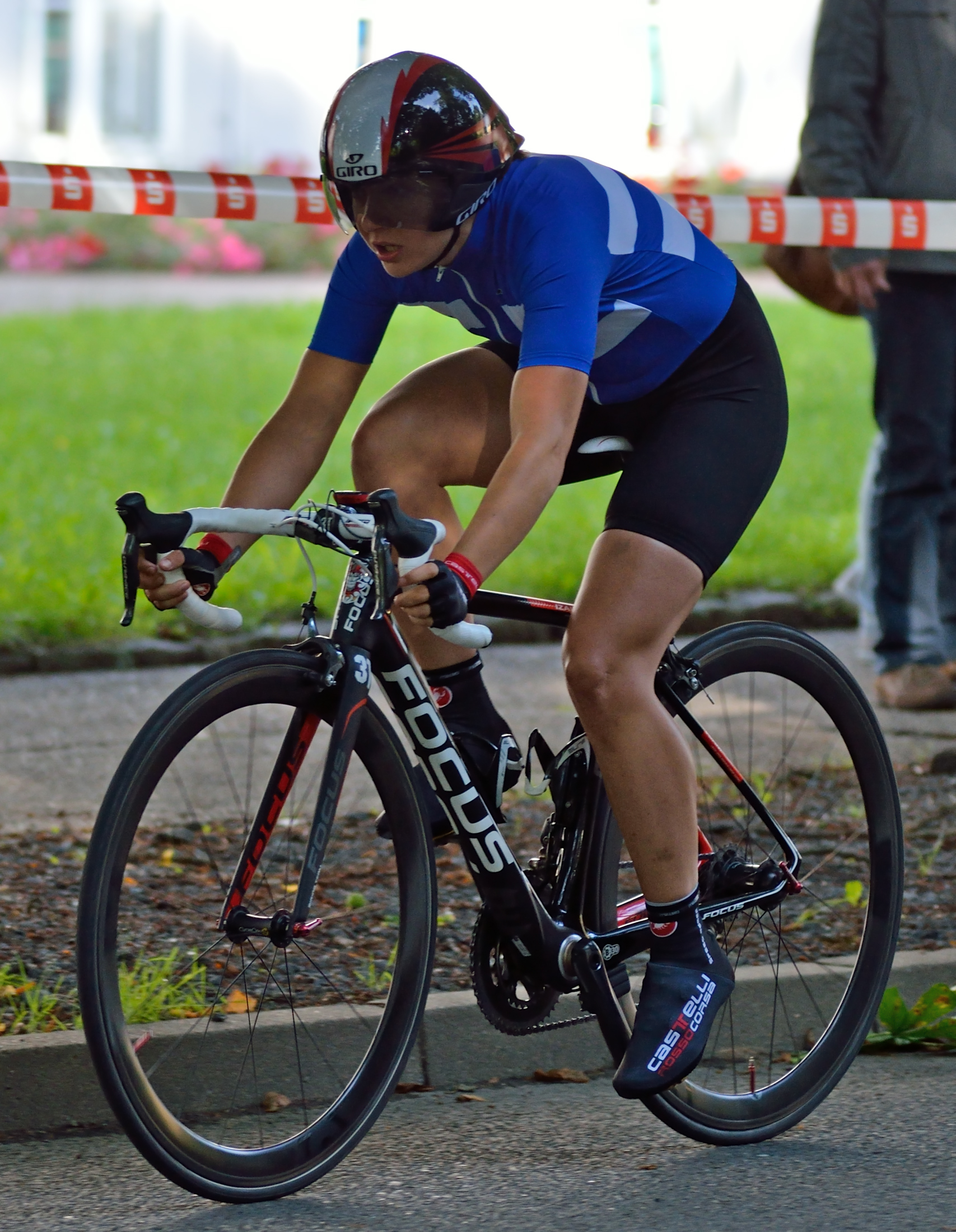

Personal information
- Full name: Anna Lindström
- Born: 19 March 1982 (age 44)

Cycling career
- Sport: Cycling
- Role: Rider

Anna Lindström (born 19 March 1982) is a Finnish former racing cyclist. She finished in third place in the Finnish National Road Race Championships in 2010, won Finnish National Time Trial Championships later 2010 and Finnish National Cyclo Cross Championships for 2011 season.
