= Carina Kirssi Ketonen =

Finnish cyclist

Personal information
- Full name: Carina Kirssi Ketonen
- Born: 1 August 1976 (age 50)

Cycling career
- Sport: Cycling
- Role: Rider

Carina Kirssi Ketonen (born 1 August 1976) is a Finnish former racing cyclist. She won the Finnish national road race title in 2009 and 2010.
