= Frans Ahlroos =

Finnish politician

Frans Fredrik Wilhelm Ahlroos
- Born: 22 April 1867; Helsinki
- Died: 11 May 1948 (aged 81)
- Occupation: Typesetter Journalist Politician

Frans Fredrik Wilhelm Ahlroos (22 April 1867 in Helsinki – 11 May 1948) was a Finnish typesetter, journalist and politician. He was a member of the Parliament of Finland from 1907 to 1909, representing the Swedish People's Party of Finland (SFP).
