= Memorial Santos–SaddleDrunk =

Brazilian cycling team

Team information
- UCI code: MSF (2016–2018); MEM (2019–)
- Registered: Brazil
- Founded: 2016
- Discipline: Road
- Status: National (2016–2018); UCI Women's Team (2019); UCI Women's Continental Team (2020–)

Team name history
- 2016–2018 2019–2020 2021–: Memorial–Santos/Fupes; Memorial–Santos; Memorial Santos–SaddleDrunk

Memorial Santos–SaddleDrunk is a professional cycling team which competes in elite road bicycle racing events such as the UCI Women's World Tour. The team was established in 2016, registering with the UCI for the 2019 season.

== Team roster ==
As of 4 May 2021.

Rider	Date of birth
Denisse Ahumada (CHI)	8 April 1993 (age 33)
Adriele Alves (BRA)	17 January 1995 (age 31)
Thayná Araujo (BRA)	10 January 1997 (age 29)
Taise Benato (BRA)	30 March 1992 (age 34)
Ana Paula Casetta (BRA)	3 April 1996 (age 30)
Gabriela da Costa (BRA)	29 September 1999 (age 26)
Sharon Dommanschet (NED)	5 January 1998 (age 28)

Rider	Date of birth
Jennifer George (GBR)	9 April 1983 (age 43)
Lisa Groothuesheidkamp (CUW)	15 July 1996 (age 30)
Minna-Maria Kangas (FIN)	5 February 1983 (age 43)
Talita Oliveira (BRA)	8 March 1997 (age 29)
Ana Paula Polegatch (BRA)	21 October 1988 (age 37)
Selma Trommer (GER)	3 November 1992 (age 33)
Anna van Wersch (NED)	14 August 2001 (age 25)

== National Champions ==
2017
Brazil Time Trial, Ana Paula Polegatch

2019
Brazil Track (Individual pursuit), Taise Benato
Argentina Track (Madison), Estefania Pilz

2021
Brazil Time Trial, Ana Paula Polegatch
Brazil Road race, Ana Paula Polegatch
Finland Cyclo-cross, Minna-Maria Kangas
