= Marek Salermo =

Finnish cyclist

Personal information
- Full name: Marek Salermo
- Born: 16 January 1978 (age 48) Helsinki, Finland

Cycling career
- Sport: Cycling
- Role: Rider

Marek Salermo (born 16 January 1978) is a Finnish former racing cyclist. He finished in second place in the Finnish National Road Race Championships in 2005.
