= Kimmo Kananen =

Finnish cyclist

Personal information
- Full name: Kimmo Kananen
- Born: 11 December 1980 (age 45) Lahti, Finland

Cycling career
- Sport: Cycling
- Role: Rider

Kimmo Kananen (born 11 December 1980) is a Finnish former racing cyclist. He finished in third place in the Finnish National Road Race Championships in 2010.
