= Tiina Nieminen =

Finnish cyclist

Personal information
- Full name: Tiina Nieminen
- Born: 11 May 1979 (age 47)

Cycling career
- Sport: Cycling
- Role: Rider

Tiina Nieminen (born 11 May 1979) is a Finnish former racing cyclist. She won the Finnish national road race title in 2007.
