= Ville de Charleroi =

Belgian cycling team

Team information
- UCI code: CHO
- Registered: Belgium
- Founded: 1995
- Disbanded: 2004
- Discipline: Road
- Status: Trade Team II (1996–2003); Trade Team I (2004)

Key personnel
- General manager: Didier Paindavaine; Joseph Braeckevelt
- Team managers: Denis Gonzalez; Alain De Roo; Johan Capiot

Team name history
- 1995 1996–1997 1998–1999 2000–2001 2002 2003 2004: Cédico–Sunjets–Ville de Charleroi; Cédico–Ville de Charleroi; Home Market–Ville de Charleroi; Ville de Charleroi–New Systems; Marlux–Ville de Charleroi; Marlux–Wincor Nixdorf; Chocolade Jacques–Wincor Nixdorf
Ville de Charleroi jersey
Jersey

Ville de Charleroi was a Belgian professional road cycling team that existed from 1995 until 2004 under several different names.

The team was selected to compete in the 2004 Giro d'Italia.

The team folded in 2004 after competing in the first division for its final season. Chocolade Jacques, one of the primary sponsors at the time, sponsored Chocolade Jacques–T Interim the following year.

== UCI ranking history ==
Season	Team rank	Top ranked rider
1995	46th	(Finland) Mika Hietanen (354)
1996	48th	(Belgium) Frank Van Den Abeele (295)
1997	50th	(Finland) Mika Hietanen (334)
1998	60th	(Belgium) Sébastien Demarbaix (413)
1999	15th (GSII)	(Belgium) Ludovic Capelle (228)
2000	22nd (GSII)	(Belgium) Ludovic Capelle (198)
2001	38th (GSII)	(Belgium) Bart Heirewegh (597)
2002	26th (GSII)	(Luxembourg) Christian Poos (584)
2003	4th (GSII)	(Belgium) Dave Bruylandts (35)
2004	25th (GSI)	(Netherlands) Gerben Löwik (75)
