= Nils Henriksson (cyclist) =

Finnish cyclist (1928–2023)

Personal information
- Born: 31 July 1928 Porvoo, Finland
- Died: 26 May 2023 (aged 94) Porvoo, Finland

Cycling career
- Sport: Cycling

Nils Olof Henriksson (31 July 1928 – 26 May 2023) was a Finnish cyclist. He won the Finnish national road race title in 1952. He also competed in the 4,000 metres team pursuit event at the 1952 Summer Olympics.
