= Jarkko Niemi (cyclist) =

Finnish cyclist

Personal information
- Full name: Jarkko Niemi
- Born: 3 November 1982 (age 43) Tampere, Finland

Cycling career
- Sport: Cycling
- Role: Rider

Jarkko Niemi (born 3 November 1982) is a Finnish racing cyclist. He won the Finnish national road race title in 2012.
