= Finnish National Road Race Championships =

National road cycling championship in Finland

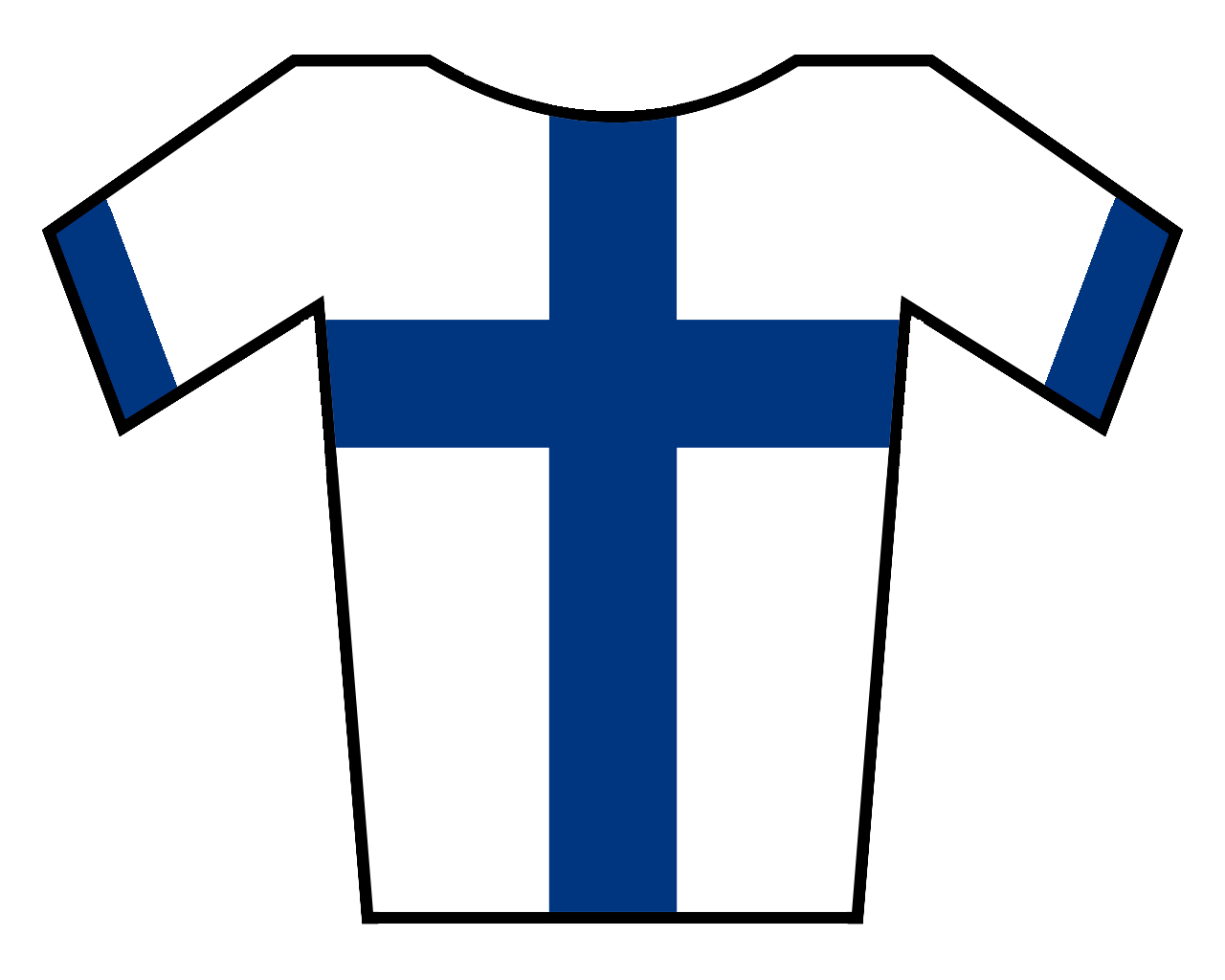
The Champion's Jersey

The Finnish National Road Race Championship is a cycling race where the Finnish cyclists decide who will become the champion for the year to come. The winners of each event are awarded with a symbolic cycling jersey, just like the national flag, these colours can be worn by the rider at other road racing events in the country to show their status as national champion. The champion's stripes can be combined into a sponsored rider's team kit design for this purpose.

== Men ==
=== Elite ===
Finnish National Road Race Championships – Men's elite race
Race details
- Region: Finland
- Discipline: Road bicycle racing
- Type: One-day

History
- First edition: 1911
- First winner: Juho Jaakonaho
- Most wins: Raul Hellberg (8 wins)
- Most recent: Axel Källberg

Year	Gold	Silver	Bronze
1911	Juho Jaakonaho		
1912	Antti Raita		
1913	Antti Raita		
1914	Juho Jaakonaho		
1915	Juho Jaakonaho		
1916–1920	Not held		
1921	Juho Jaakonaho		
1922	Not held		
1923	Raul Hellberg		
1924	Raul Hellberg		
1925	Raul Hellberg		
1926	Raul Hellberg		
1927	Raul Hellberg		
1928	Raul Hellberg		
1929	Raul Hellberg		
1930	Thor Porko		
1931	Raul Hellberg		
1932	Martti Torppa		
1933	Helmer Munther		
1934	Helmer Munther		
1935	Toivo Kokkola		
1936	Thor Porko		
1937	Leo Roine		
1938	Tauno Luostarinen		
1939	Aimo Pajula		
1940	Tauno Luostarinen		
1941–1942	Not held		
1943	Sven Hilden		
1944	Albin Andersson		
1945	Aimo Pajula		
1946	Paul Backman		
1947–1950	Not held		
1951	Torvald Högström		
1952	Nils Olof Henriksson		
1953	Anders Ruben Forsblom		
1954	Anders Ruben Forsblom		
1955	Paul Nyman		
1956	Paul Nyman		
1957	Ole Wackström		
1958	Paul Nyman		
1959	Not held		
1960	Unto Hautalahti		
1961	Unto Hautalahti		
1962	Antero Lumme		
1963	Antero Lumme		
1964	Antero Lumme		
1965	Antero Lumme		
1966	Unto Hautalahti		
1967–1968	Not held		
1969	Kalevi Eskelinen		
1970	Mauno Uusivirta		
1971	Tapani Vuorenhela	Harry Hannus	
1972	Harry Hannus		
1973	Harry Hannus		
1974	Harry Hannus		
1975	Kari Puisto		
1976	Kari Puisto		
1977	Not held		
1978	Harry Hannus		
1979	Harry Hannus		
1980	Patrick Wackström		
1981	Patrick Wackström		
1982	Harry Hannus		
1983	Kari Myyryläinen		
1984	Harry Hannus		
1985	Kari Myyryläinen		
1986	Kari Myyryläinen		
1987	Not held		
1988	Jari Lähde		
1989	Kimmo Karhu		
1990–1994	Not held		
1995	Esa Skyttä		
1996	Joona Laukka	Esa Skyttä	Kari Myyryläinen
1997	Mika Hietanen	Kjell Carlström	Marek Salermo
1998	Esa Skyttä	Kjell Carlström	Mika Hietanen
1999	Mika Hietanen	Jukka Heinikainen	Christian Selin
2000	Kjell Carlström	Esa Skyttä	Patrik Hänninen
2001	Christian Selin	Jukka Heinikainen	Joona Laukka
2002	Jukka Heinikainen	Jussi Veikkanen	Kjell Carlström
2003	Jussi Veikkanen	Kjell Carlström	Oscar Stenström
2004	Kjell Carlström	Oscar Stenström	Jussi Veikkanen
2005	Jussi Veikkanen	Marek Salermo	Oscar Stenström
2006	Jussi Veikkanen	Mika Nieminen	Tommi Martikainen
2007	Matti Pajari	Kjell Carlström	Tero Hämeenaho
2008	Jussi Veikkanen	Kjell Carlström	Matti Helminen
2009	Toni Liias	Kjell Carlström	Matti Helminen
2010	Jussi Veikkanen	Kjell Carlström	Kimmo Kananen
2011	Kjell Carlström	Paavo Paajanen	Mikko Paajanen
2012	Jarkko Niemi	Mikko Kejo	Mika Simola
2013	Jussi Veikkanen	Paavo Paajanen	Mika Simola
2014	Jussi Veikkanen	Joonas Henttala	Samuel Pökälä
2015	Samuel Pökälä	Jussi Veikkanen	Matti Helminen
2016	Jesse Kaislavuo	Petter Mattsson	Tommi Martikainen
2017	Matti Manninen	Jaakko Hänninen	Sasu Halme
2018	Anders Bäckman	Sauli Pietikainen	Lauri Seppä
2019	Arto Vainionpää	Anders Bäckman	Joni Kanerva
2020	Antti-Jussi Juntunen	Ukko Iisakki Peltonen	Joonas Henttala
2021	Joonas Henttala	Ukko Iisakki Peltonen	Antti-Jussi Juntunen
2022	Anders Bäckman	Riku Övermark	Antti-Jussi Juntunen
2023	Antti-Jussi Juntunen	Oskari Kolehmainen	Axel Källberg
2024	Jaakko Hänninen	Antti-Jussi Juntunen	Karl-Nicolas Grönlund
2025	Vladyslav Makogon	Jaakko Sillankorva	Anders Bäckman
2026	Axel Källberg	Riku Övermark	Petja Teppo

== Women ==
=== Elite ===
Finnish National Road Race Championships – Women's elite race
Race details
- Region: Finland
- Discipline: Road bicycle racing
- Type: One-day

History
- First edition: 1997
- First winner: Pia Sundstedt
- Most wins: Lotta Lepistö (7 wins)
- Most recent: Anniina Ahtosalo

Year	Gold	Silver	Bronze
1997	Pia Sundstedt	Sanna Lehtimäki	
1998	Sanna Lehtimäki	Tuija Kinnunen	Sari Saarelainen
1999	Sanna Lehtimäki	Maaria Siren	Sirpa Ahlroos-Kouko
2000	Sirpa Ahlroos-Kouko	Maaria Siren	Teija Alaviiri
2001	Pia Sundstedt	Sirpa Ahlroos-Kouko	Tiina Nieminen
2002	Not held		
2003	Maaria Siren	Mirella Harju	Maija Laurila
2004	Not held		
2005	Pia Sundstedt	Tiina Nieminen	Liris Karhu
2006	Maija Laurila	Carina Kirssi Ketonen	Ann-Mary Ähtävä
2007	Tiina Nieminen	Paula Suominen	Elisa Arvo
2008	Mirella Harju	Lotta Lepistö	Paula Suominen
2009	Carina Kirssi Ketonen	Merja Kiviranta	Ann-Mary Ähtävä
2010	Carina Kirssi Ketonen	Sari Saarelainen	Anna Lindström
2011	Pia Sundstedt	Riikka Pynnönen	Mirella Harju
2012	Lotta Lepistö	Rosa Törmänen	Maija Rossi
2013	Lotta Lepistö	Riikka Pynnönen	Anna Lindström
2014	Lotta Lepistö	Sari Saarelainen	Laura Vainionpää
2015	Lotta Lepistö	Laura Vainionpää	Pia Pensaari
2016	Lotta Lepistö	Laura Vainionpää	Sari Saarelainen
2017	Lotta Lepistö	Minna-Maria Kangas	Sari Saarelainen
2018	Lotta Lepistö	Eeva Sarlin	Pia Pensaari
2019	Pia Pensaari	Minna-Maria Kangas	Eva Lehtinen
2020	Minna-Maria Kangas	Hanna Joronen	Ida Sten
2021	Antonia Gröndahl	Minna-Maria Kangas	Meri Helmi
2022	Anniina Ahtosalo	Laura Vainionpää	Antonia Gröndahl
2023	Anniina Ahtosalo	Lotta Henttala	Antonia Gröndahl
