= Unto Hautalahti =

Finnish cyclist

Personal information
- Full name: Unto Hautalahti
- Born: 11 March 1936 Nivala, Finland
- Died: 22 December 2019 (aged 83)

Cycling career
- Sport: Cycling
- Role: Rider

Unto Hautalahti (11 March 1936 – 22 December 2019) was a Finnish racing cyclist. He was born in Hakalahdenk, and his profession was a metalworker. He won the Finnish national road race title in 1960, 1961 and 1966. He also competed in the individual road race and team time trial events at the 1960 Summer Olympics.
