= Juho Jaakonaho =

Finnish cyclist

Personal information
- Born: 1 September 1882 Haapajärvi, Finland
- Died: 21 January 1964 (aged 81) Haapajärvi, Finland

Cycling career
- Sport: Cycling

Johannes "Juho" Jaakonaho (1 September 1882 – 21 January 1964) was a Finnish road racing cyclist who competed in the 1912 Summer Olympics.

In 1912 he did not finish in the individual time trial event. Therefore, he was the weakest link of the Finnish cycling team which competed in the team time trial event and finished fifth.

He won the Finnish national road race title in 1911, 1914, 1915 and 1921.

Death

He was born and died in Haapajärvi.
