= Minna-Maria Kangas =

Finnish cyclist

Personal information
- Born: 5 February 1983 (age 43)

Cycling career
- Sport: Cycling
- Current team: Bingoal-WB Ladies
- Disciplines: Road; Cyclo-cross
- Role: Rider

Amateur team
- 2019: Restore–Wahoo

Professional teams
- 2021: Memorial Santos–SaddleDrunk
- 2023: Bingoal-WB Ladies

Minna-Maria Kangas (born 5 February 1983) is a Finnish racing cyclist, who currently rides for Bingoal-WB Ladies. In August 2020, she won the Finnish National Road Race Championships.

== Major results ==
2016
3rd Individual Pursuit, National Track Championships

2017
2nd Road Race, National Road Championships

2018
1st Stage 1a Tour of Uppsala

2019
National Road Championships

1st Time Trial
2nd Road Race

2020
National Road Championships

1st Time Trial
1st Road Race

1st Cyclo-cross, National Cyclo-cross Championships

2021
National Road Championships

2nd Time Trial
2nd Road Race
