= Matti Pajari =

Finnish cyclist

Personal information
- Full name: Matti Pajari
- Born: 17 March 1979 (age 47)

Cycling career
- Sport: Cycling
- Role: Rider

Matti Pajari (born 17 March 1979) is a Finnish former racing cyclist. He won the Finnish national road race title in 2007.
