= Miika Hietanen =

Finnish cyclist

Personal information
- Full name: Miika Hietanen
- Born: 27 January 1968 (age 58) Helsinki, Finland

Cycling career
- Sport: Cycling
- Discipline: Road
- Role: Rider

Amateur team
- 2000–2001: AS Corbeil-Essonnes

Professional teams
- 1995–1997: Cédico–Sunjets–Ville de Charleroi
- 1999: Saint-Quentin–Oktos–MBK

Miika Hietanen (born 27 January 1968) is a Finnish former racing cyclist. He won the Finnish national road race title in 1997 and 1999.

== Major results ==
1991
3rd Vlaamse Havenpijl
1992
1st Grand Prix des Marbriers
1st Stage 6 Circuit Franco-Belge
3rd Paris–Tours Espoirs
1993
3rd Overall Circuit Franco-Belge

1st Stage 6

1994
1st Time trial, National Road Championships
1995
1st Circuito de Getxo
1997
National Road Championships

1st Time trial
1st Road race

1998
National Road Championships

1st Time trial
3rd Road race

1st Overall Ronde de l'Oise
1999
National Road Championships

1st Time trial
1st Road race

5th Lincoln Grand Prix
2000
1st Paris–Chauny
2001
1st Stage 3 Tour Nord-Isère
2003
2nd Grand Prix Cristal Energie
