= Jesse Kaislavuo =

Finnish cyclist

Personal information
- Born: 24 April 1992 (age 34)

Cycling career
- Sport: Cycling
- Role: Rider

Jesse Kaislavuo (born 24 April 1992) is a Finnish racing cyclist. He won the Finnish national road race title in 2016.
