= Thor Porko =

Finnish cyclist

Personal information
- Full name: Thor Porko
- Born: 7 June 1905 Nedervetil, Finland
- Died: 1 June 1977 (aged 71) Kokkola, Finland

Cycling career
- Sport: Cycling
- Role: Rider

Thor Porko (7 June 1905 – 1 June 1977) was a Finnish racing cyclist. He won the Finnish national road race title in 1930 and 1936. He also competed at the 1936 Summer Olympics.
