= Kjell Carlström =

Finnish road bicycle racer

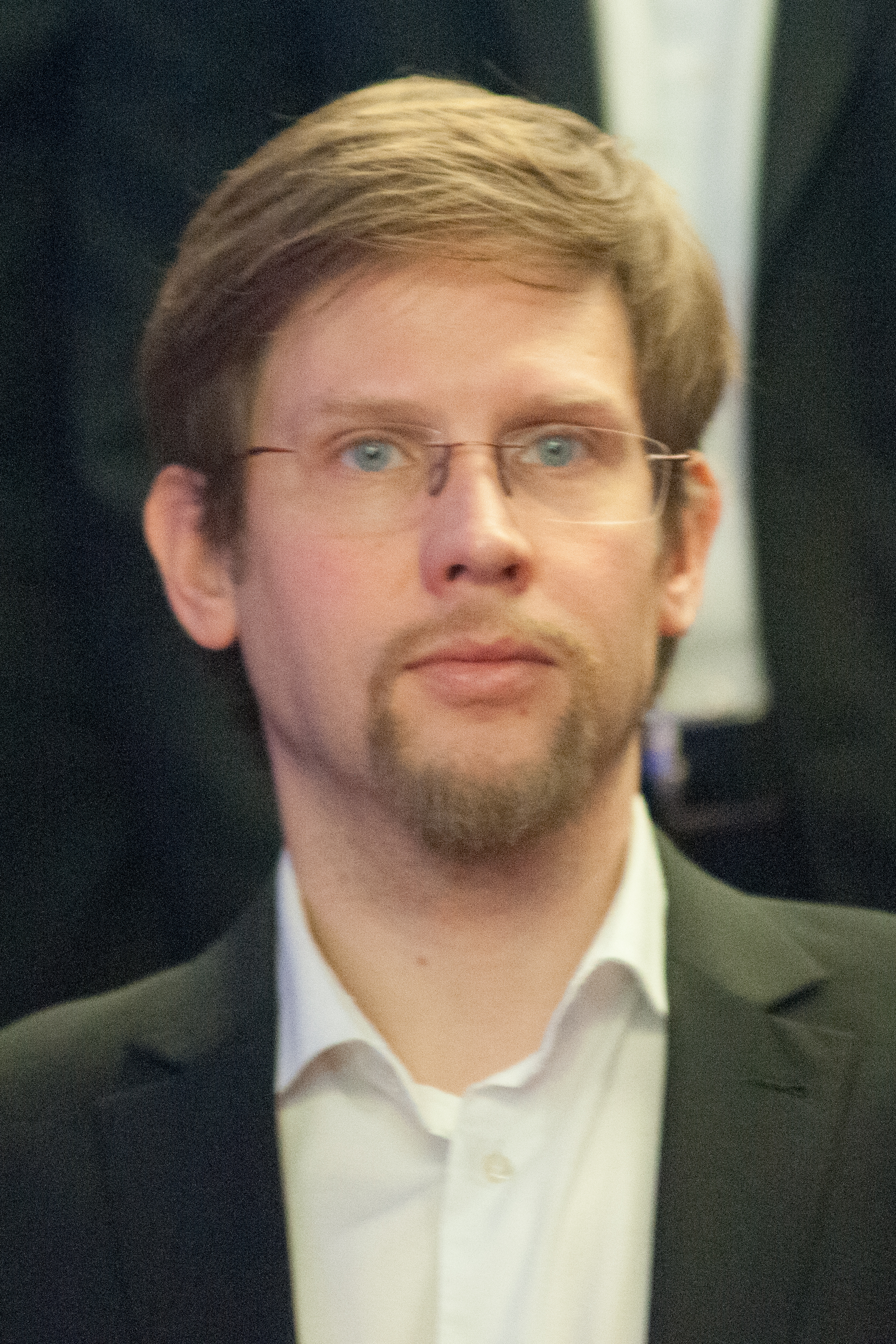
- Carlström in 2014

Personal information
- Full name: Kjell Carlström
- Born: 18 October 1976 (age 49) Porvoo, Finland
- Height: 1.81 m (5 ft 11 in)
- Weight: 70 kg (154 lb)

Cycling career
- Sport: Cycling
- Current team: NSN Cycling Team
- Discipline: Road
- Role: Rider (retired); Directeur sportif

Professional teams
- 2002–2004: Amore & Vita–Beretta
- 2005–2009: Liquigas–Bianchi
- 2010–2011: Team Sky

Managerial teams
- 2013–2016: IAM Cycling
- 2017–: Israel Cycling Academy

Major wins
- One day races National Road Race Championships (2000, 2004, 2011)

Kjell Carlström (born 18 October 1976) is a Finnish former professional road racing cyclist, who competed as a professional between 2002 and 2011. He won the Finnish national road race title in 2000, 2004 and 2011.

He raced in the Tour de France in 2005, 2006 and 2007. His best performance in the Tour de France was a second place stage finish on stage 8 in the 2006 race. In December 2011 he announced his retirement after his contract with Team Sky was not renewed and he was unable to find a new team.

Starting in 2013, he became one of the directeurs sportifs at IAM Cycling. After the team disbanded, he moved to a similar position at NSN Cycling Team, where he presently works as the team's general manager.

== Major results ==
2003
1st Stage 7 Tour of Queensland
2004
1st Road race, National Road Championships
1st Overall UNIQA Classic

1st Stage 2

2005
1st Stage 3 UNIQA Classic
2007
2nd Road race, National Road Championships
2008
1st Stage 3 Paris–Nice
2nd Road race, National Road Championships
3rd Klasika Primavera
2009
1st Road race, National Road Championships
2010
2nd Road race, National Road Championships
2011
1st Road race, National Road Championships
