= Sanna Lehtimäki =

Finnish cyclist

Personal information
- Full name: Sanna Lehtimäki
- Born: 16 November 1975 (age 50) Ylöjärvi, Finland

Cycling career
- Sport: Cycling
- Role: Rider

Sanna Lehtimäki (born 16 November 1975) is a Finnish former racing cyclist. She won the Finnish national road race title in 1998 and 1999.
