= Maija Laurila =

Finnish cyclist

Personal information
- Full name: Maija Laurila
- Born: 7 July 1983 (age 43)

Cycling career
- Sport: Cycling
- Role: Rider

Maija Laurila (born 7 July 1983) is a Finnish former racing cyclist. She won the Finnish national road race title in 2006.
