= Mirella Harju =

Finnish cyclist

Personal information
- Full name: Mirella Harju
- Born: 29 September 1982 (age 44)

Cycling career
- Sport: Cycling
- Role: Rider

Mirella Harju (born 29 September 1982) is a Finnish former racing cyclist. She won the Finnish national road race title in 2008.
