= Paul Nyman =

Finnish cyclist (1929–2020)

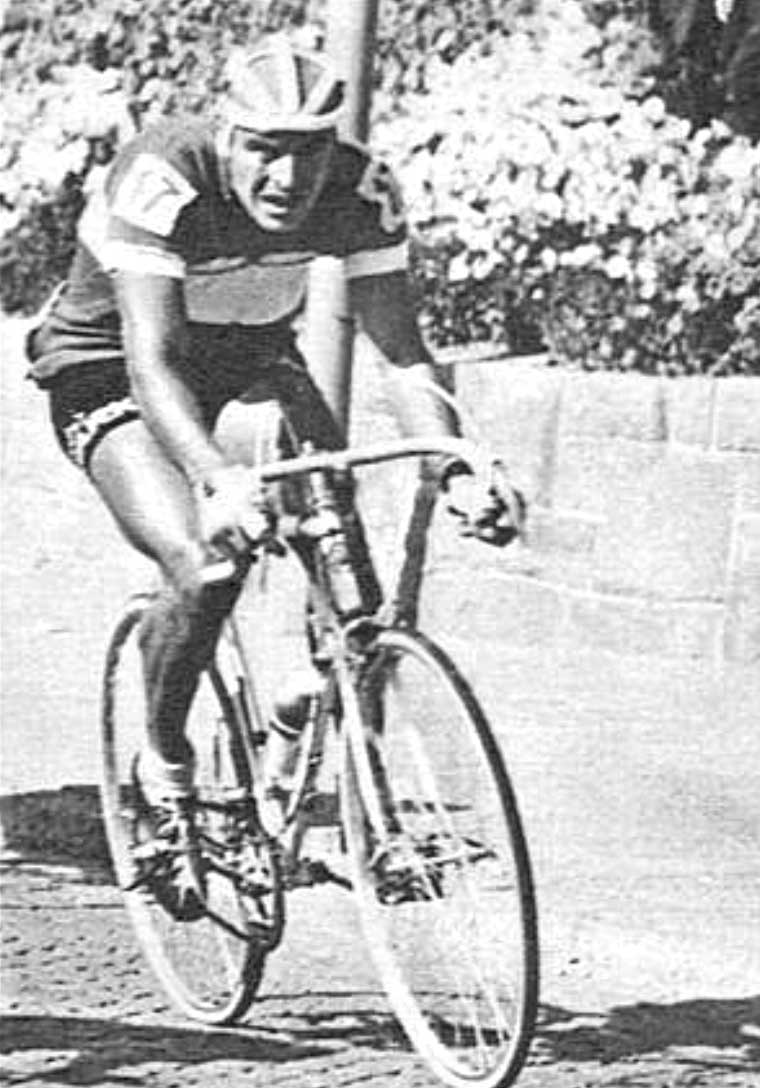
- Paul Nyman

Personal information
- Born: 3 August 1929 Viipuri, Finland
- Died: 25 November 2020 (aged 91)

Cycling career
- Sport: Cycling

Paul Nyman (3 August 1929 – 25 November 2020) was a Finnish cyclist. He won the Finnish national road race title in 1955, 1956 and 1958. He also competed at the 1952, 1956 and 1960 Summer Olympics. He started in Peace Race four times: 1954 – did not finish, 1955 – 12., 1956 – 4. (this was the best result of a Finnish rider in this race), 1957 – 22.
