= Raul Hellberg =

Finnish cyclist

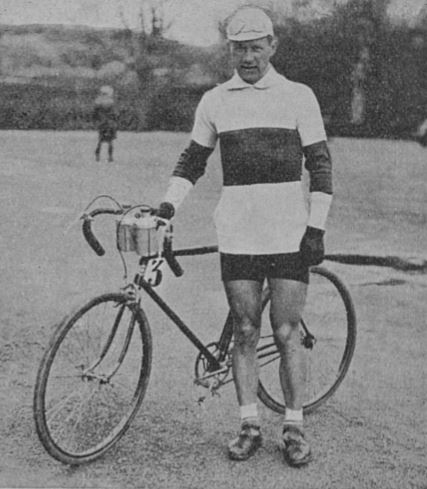
- Raul Hellberg before competing in the 1928 Nokia-ajo.

Personal information
- Full name: Raul Hellberg
- Born: 15 December 1900 Porvoo, Finland
- Died: 30 October 1985 (aged 84) Porvoo, Finland

Cycling career
- Sport: Cycling
- Role: Rider

Raul Hellberg (Finnish pronunciation: [ˈrɑu̯l ˈhelːbeɾk]; 15 December 1900 – 30 October 1985) was a Finnish racing cyclist. He won the Finnish national road race title eight times between 1923 and 1931. He also competed in the men's individual road race at the 1928 Summer Olympics.
