= Antti Raita =

Finnish cyclist

Personal information
- Born: 15 November 1883 Turku, Finland
- Died: 1 September 1968 (aged 84) St. Clair Shores, Michigan, United States

Cycling career
- Sport: Cycling

Anders "Antti" August Raita (15 November 1883 – 1 September 1968) was a Finnish road racing cyclist who competed in the 1912 Summer Olympics. He was born in Turku and died in St. Clair Shores, Michigan, United States.

In 1912, he was a member of the Finnish cycling team, which finished fifth in the team time trial event. He finished sixth in the individual time trial competition. He won the Finnish national road race title in 1912 and 1913.
