= Antero Lumme =

Finnish cyclist

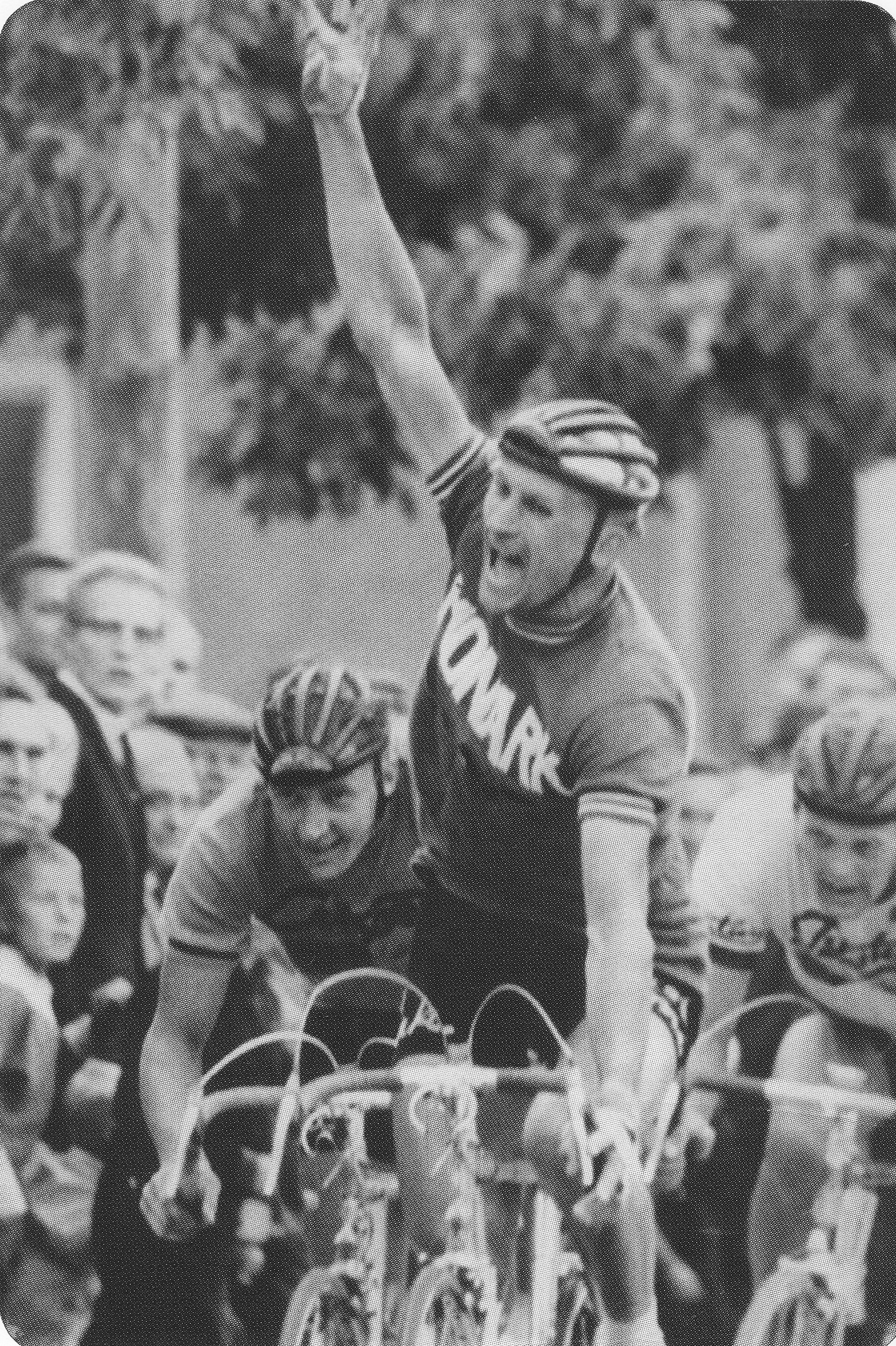

Personal information
- Full name: Antero Lumme
- Born: 1934
- Died: 11 October 2016 (aged 82) Kokkola, Finland

Cycling career
- Sport: Cycling
- Role: Rider

Antero Lumme (1934 – 11 October 2016) was a Finnish racing cyclist. He won the Finnish national road race title four consecutive times between 1962 and 1965.
