= Sonkajärvi =

- Municipality
- Sonkajärven kunta Sonkajärvi kommun
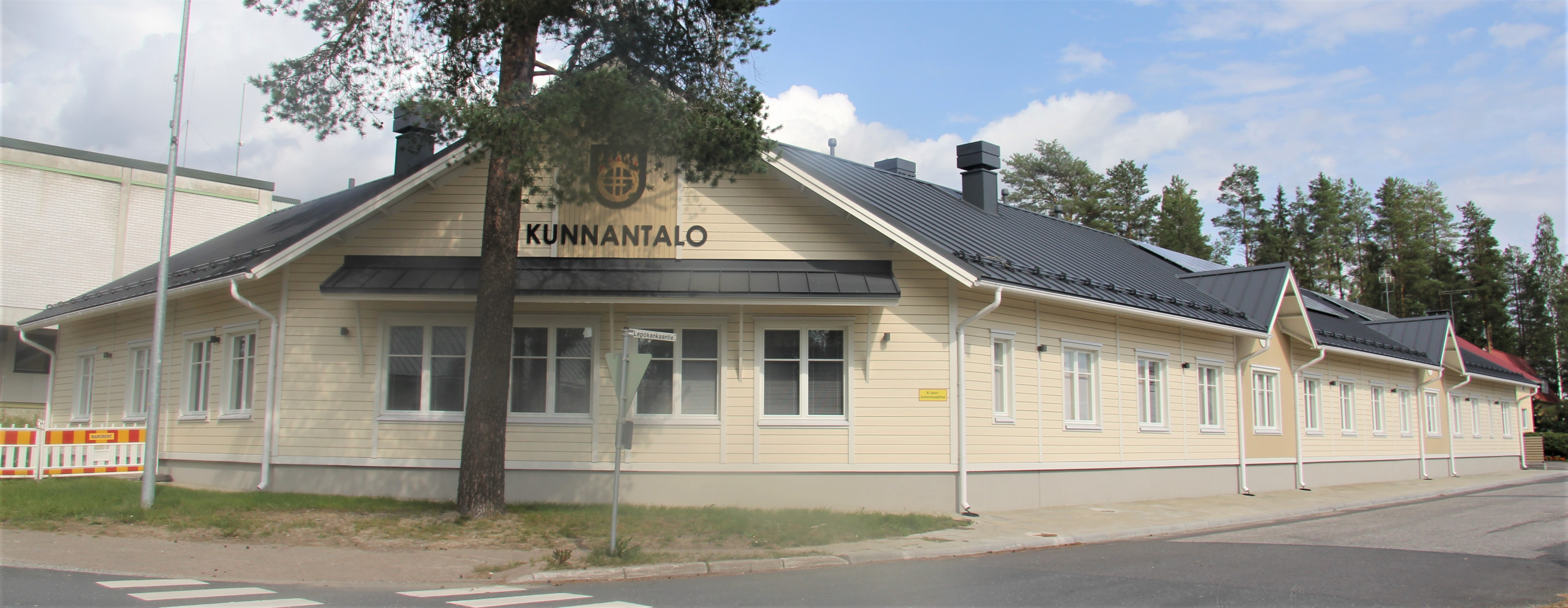
- Sonkajärvi town hall

- Coat of arms

- Location of Sonkajärvi in Finland
- Interactive map of Sonkajärvi
- Coordinates: 63°40′N 27°31′E
- Country: Finland
- Region: North Savo
- Sub-region: Upper Savo
- Charter: 1922

Government
  - Municipal manager: Simo Mäkinen

Area (2018-01-01)
  - Total: 1,576.78 km^{2} (608.80 sq mi)
  - Land: 1,465.93 km^{2} (566.00 sq mi)
  - Water: 110.86 km^{2} (42.80 sq mi)
  - Rank: 44th largest in Finland

Population (2025-12-31)
  - Total: 3,521
  - Rank: 202nd largest in Finland
  - Density: 2.4/km^{2} (6.2/sq mi)

Population by native language
  - Finnish: 98% (official)
  - Others: 2%

Population by age
  - 0 to 14: 12.2%
  - 15 to 64: 53.4%
  - 65 or older: 34.5%
- Time zone: UTC+02:00 (EET)
  - Summer (DST): UTC+03:00 (EEST)
- Website: www.sonkajarvi.fi

Sonkajärvi (Finnish pronunciation: [ˈsoŋkɑˌjærʋi]; formerly known as Rutakko) is a municipality of Finland. It is located in North Savo region, 105 kilometres (65 mi) north of Kuopio. The municipality has a population of 3,521 (31 December 2025) and covers an area of 1,576.78 square kilometres (608.80 sq mi) of which 110.86 km^{2} (42.80 sq mi) is water. The population density is 2.4 inhabitants per square kilometre (6.2/sq mi). The municipality is unilingually Finnish.

The coat of arms of Sonkajärvi is inspired by the many watermills in the region, which the picture of the water wheel refers to, and the slash-and-burn cultivation of the past, which the flames on top of the wheel refer to. The coat of arms was designed by Ahti Hammar, and the Sonkajärvi municipal council approved it at its meeting on July 15, 1954. The Ministry of the Interior approved the coat of arms for use on October 15 of the same year.

== Geography ==
Neighbouring municipalities are Iisalmi, Kajaani, Lapinlahti, Rautavaara, Sotkamo and Vieremä.

=== Nature ===
There are 204 lakes in the area of Sonkajärvi. Biggest of them are Laakajärvi, Sälevä and Kiltuanjärvi.

There are unique nature sights in the municipality of Sonkajärvi, for example the northernmost in Finland reliably confirmed habitats of wild small-leaved lime (Tilia cordata) in the vicinity of the lake of Kangaslampi, 63° 45′ N and near the hill of Salmisenmäki, 63° 43′ 42" N.

== History ==
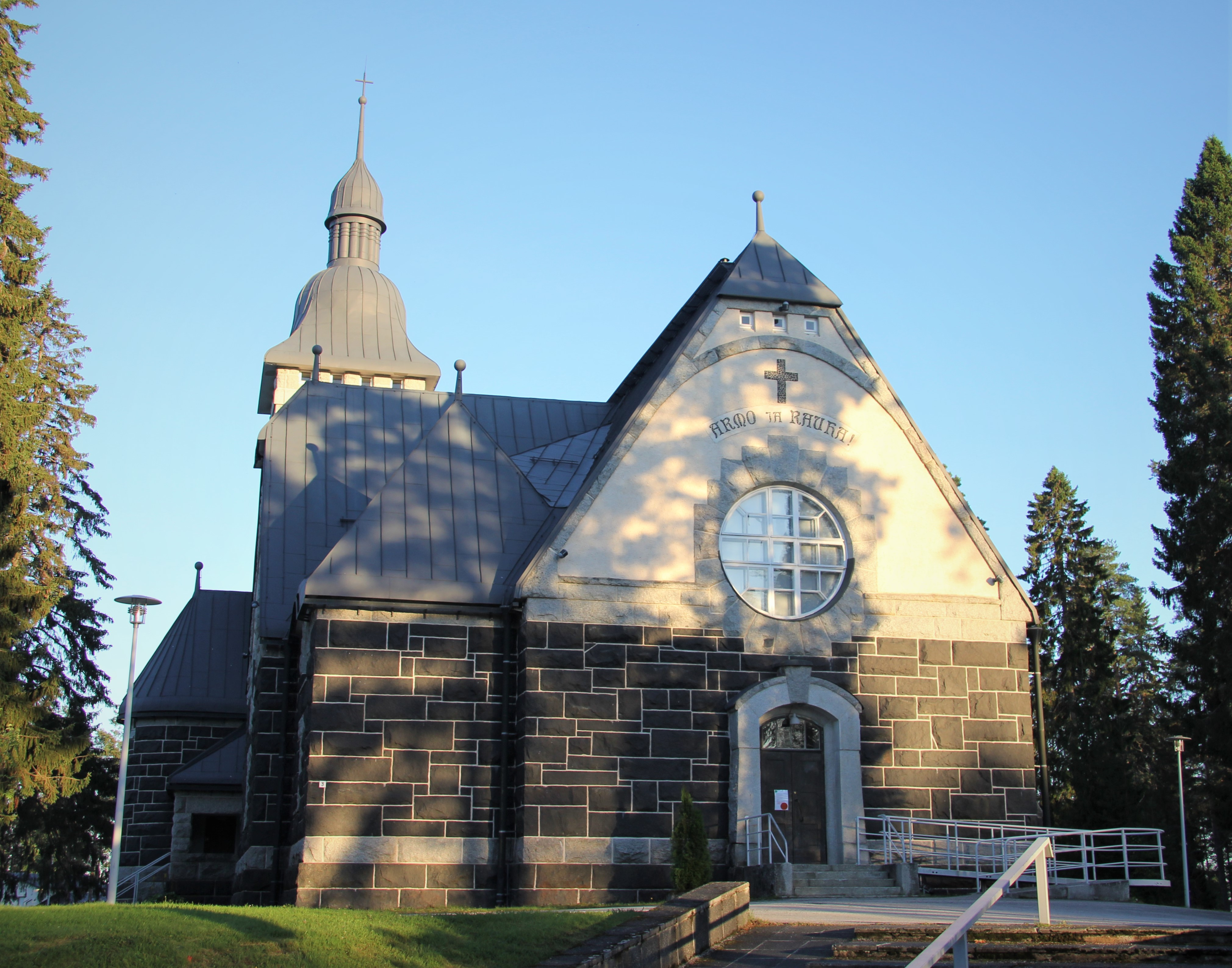
Sonkajärvi Church

The municipality was founded in 1922. Before it Sonkajärvi was a part of Iisalmen maalaiskunta.

== Transport ==
Highway 5 (E63) is located about 10 kilometres (6.2 mi) west of the center of Sonkajärvi.

== Wife carrying competition ==
Sonkajärvi has gained a worldwide fame for the alternative sport of wife-carrying (Finnish: akankanto or eukonkanto). The first Wife Carrying World Championship dates to 1994, but the creation of the contest, apart from its humorous aspects, has deep roots in the local history. In the late 19th century there was in the area a brigand called Rosvo-Ronkainen, who is said to have accepted in his troops only those men who proved their worth on a challenging track. In those days, it was also a common practice to steal women from the neighbouring villages.

In the Wife Carrying competition each team has one male and one female member, the objective being for the male to carry the female through a special obstacle track. The basic rules are that the woman must be over 17 years of age and have a weight of at least 49 kilograms (108 lb). If she is below that weight, she must be burdened with such a heavy rucksack so that the total weight to be carried by the man is at least 49 kilograms. The only equipment allowed is a belt worn by the carrier and a helmet worn by the carried. The track in Sonkajärvi used annually for the World Championship is 253.5 metres (832 ft) long.

== Notable people ==
- Kalevi Eskelinen, racing cyclist
- Päivi Räsänen, politician
- Jussi Vatanen, actor

== International relations ==
=== Twin towns — Sister cities ===
- Väike-Maarja Parish, Estonia (since 1997)
