= Kimmo Karhu =

Finnish cyclist

Personal information
- Full name: Kimmo Karhu

Cycling career
- Sport: Cycling
- Role: Rider

Kimmo Karhu is a Finnish former racing cyclist. He won the Finnish national road race title in 1989.
