= Christian Selin =

Finnish cyclist

Personal information
- Full name: Christian Selin
- Born: 16 January 1976 (age 50) Lohja, Finland

Cycling career
- Sport: Cycling
- Role: Rider

Christian Selin (born 16 January 1976) is a Finnish former racing cyclist. He won the Finnish national road race title in 2001.
