= Simo Morri =

Finnish sport shooter

Personal information
- Full name: Simo Artturi Morri
- Born: 10 November 1944 (age 81) Sysmä, Finland

Sport
- Sport: Sports shooting

Simo Artturi Morri (born 10 November 1944) is a Finnish former sports shooter. He competed in two events at the 1968 Summer Olympics. He spent eleven years in prison after murdering his wife.
