= Maaria Siren =

Finnish cyclist

Personal information
- Full name: Maaria Siren
- Born: 22 July 1977 (age 49)

Cycling career
- Sport: Cycling
- Role: Rider

Maaria Siren (born 22 July 1977) is a Finnish former racing cyclist. She won the Finnish national road race title in 2003.
