= Jouko Kataja =

Finnish footballer (1953–2018)

Personal information
- Date of birth: 4 June 1953
- Place of birth: Lahti, Finland
- Date of death: 2018 (65 years)
- Position: Goalkeeper

Senior career*
Years	Team	Apps	(Gls)
1972–1974	Reipas	3	(0)
1975–1978	MiPK	70	(0)
1979–1982	KTP	70	(0)
1983	LTP	–	(0)
1984	Reipas Lahti	14	(0)
1986–1987	Apollo	–	(0)
1988–1990	Sudet	–	(1)

International career
1980	Finland	0	(0)
- * Club domestic league appearances and goals

Jouko Kataja (4 June 1953 – 2018) was a Finnish footballer. He played 11 eleven seasons in the Finnish premier division Mestaruussarja in 1972–1982 for Reipas, MiPK and KTP.

Kataja was a member of the Finland squad at the 1980 Summer Olympics, although he was never capped by the Finland A team.

Kataja died in November 2018 at the age of 65.

== Club honours ==
- Finnish Cup 1973, 1980
