= Kalevi Eskelinen =

Finnish cyclist

Personal information
- Full name: Kalevi Eskelinen
- Born: 9 October 1945 (age 81) Sonkajärvi, Finland

Cycling career
- Sport: Cycling
- Role: Rider

Kalevi Eskelinen (born 9 October 1945) is a Finnish former racing cyclist. He won the Finnish national road race title in 1969. Additionally, he competed at the 1972 Summer Olympics.
