= Esa Skyttä =

Finnish cyclist

Personal information
- Full name: Esa Skyttä

Cycling career
- Sport: Cycling
- Role: Rider

Esa Skyttä is a Finnish former racing cyclist. He won the Finnish national road race title in 1995 and 1998.
