= Sälevä =

Body of water in Finland

- Location within Finland
- Coordinates: 63°32′N 27°53′E
- Type: Lake
- Primary outflows: via Itäkoski rapids to lake Korpinen
- Catchment area: Vuoksi
- Basin countries: Finland
- Surface area: 16.796 km^{2} (6.485 sq mi)
- Average depth: 3.87 m (12.7 ft)
- Max. depth: 21.59 m (70.8 ft)
- Water volume: 0.065 km^{3} (53,000 acre⋅ft)
- Shore length^{1}: 100.97 km (62.74 mi)
- Surface elevation: 117.1 m (384 ft)
- Frozen: December–April
- Islands: Etusaari, iso Kumpusaari, Tulisaari
- Settlements: Sonkajärvi
- ^{1} Shore length is not a well-defined measure.

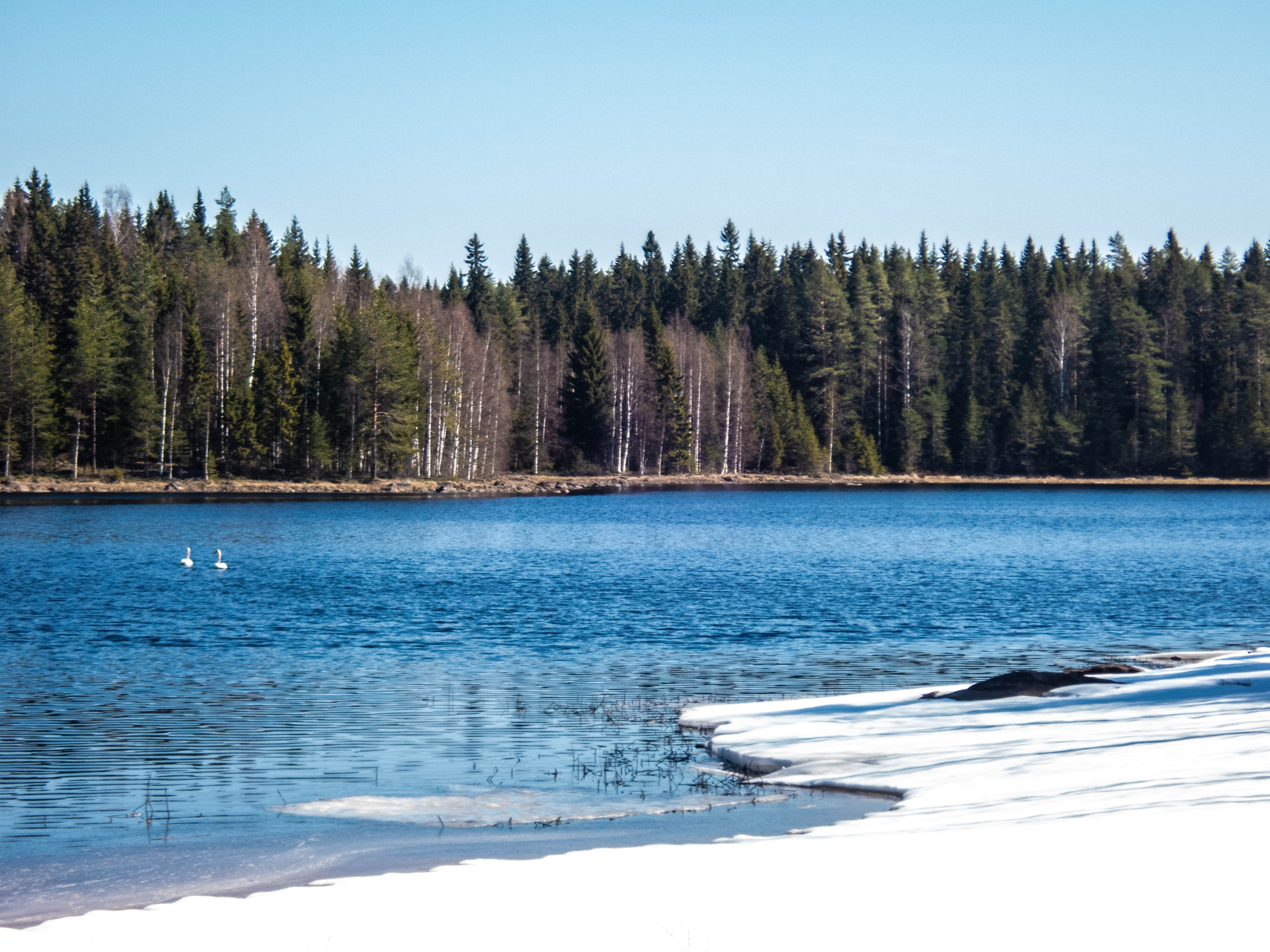
Sälevä Lake, Sonkajärvi (May 2021)

Sälevä is medium-sized lake in the Vuoksi main catchment area. It is located in Sonkajärvi municipality, in the region of Northern Savonia in Finland. Sälevä is one of the biggest lakes in Sonkajärvi municipality.

== See also ==
- List of lakes in Finland
