= Juha Helin =

Finnish footballer (born 1954)

Personal information
- Date of birth: 4 January 1954 (age 72)
- Place of birth: Kemi, Finland
- Position: Defender

International career
Years	Team	Apps	(Gls)
- Finland

Juha Helin (born 4 January 1954) is a Finnish former footballer. He competed in the men's tournament at the 1980 Summer Olympics.
