= Kari Myyryläinen =

Finnish cyclist

Personal information
- Full name: Kari Myyryläinen
- Born: 22 October 1963 (age 62) Hyvinkää, Finland

Cycling career
- Sport: Cycling
- Discipline: Road
- Role: Rider

Amateur teams
- 2016: Porvoon Akilles
- 2018–2019: Porvoon Akilles

Professional team
- 1986–1988: Reynolds

Kari Myyryläinen (born 22 October 1963) is a Finnish former professional racing cyclist. He won the Finnish national road race title in 1983, 1985 and 1986. He also competed at the 1984 and 1996 Summer Olympics.

== Major results ==
1980
1st Road race, National Junior Road Championships
1981
National Junior Road Championships

1st Road race
1st Time trial

1983
National Road Championships

1st Road race
1st Time trial

2nd Overall Tour de Berlin
1984
1st Time trial, National Road Championships
1985
National Road Championships

1st Road race
1st Time trial

1st Grand Prix de France
7th Overall Tour of Norway
1986
1st Road race, National Road Championships
1st Paris-Évreux
2nd Overall Tour de Berlin
2nd Scandinavian Open Road Race
1987
1st Stage 2 Vuelta a Burgos
1st Stage 5 Tour de l'Avenir
1990
7th Overall Tour of Norway

1st Stages 1 & 3

1991
1st Stage 4 Cinturón a Mallorca
1993
1st Time trial, National Road Championships
1994
8th Overall Tour of Sweden
1996
3rd Road race, National Road Championships
