= Liia (given name) =

Female given name

- Gender: Female
- Language: Estonian
- Name day: 5 January

Origin
- Region of origin: Estonia

Other names
- Related names: Liina, Lea

Liia is an Estonian feminine given name. As of 1 January 2020, 1,114 women in Estonia have the first name Liia, making it the 169th most popular female name in the country. The name is most commonly found in Saare County. Individuals bearing the name Liia include:

- Liia Hänni (born 1946), astrophysicist, social activist and politician
- Liia Kanemägi-Jõerand (born 1974), actress
- Liia Leetmaa (1924–2004), ballet dancer and dance teacher
- Liia Lüdig (born 1950), painter
