= Toni Liias =

Finnish cyclist

Personal information
- Full name: Toni Liias
- Born: 16 October 1986 (age 39)

Cycling career
- Sport: Cycling
- Role: Rider

Toni Liias (born 16 October 1986) is a Finnish racing cyclist. He won the Finnish national road race title in 2009.
