= Tapani Vuorenhela =

Finnish cyclist

Personal information
- Full name: Tapani Vuorenhela
- Born: 15 September 1947 (age 79) Somero, Finland

Cycling career
- Sport: Cycling
- Role: Rider

Tapani Aimo Vuorenhela (born 15 September 1947) is a Finnish former racing cyclist. He won the Finnish national road race title in 1971. He also competed in the individual road race at the 1972 Summer Olympics.
