= Kari Puisto =

Finnish cyclist

Personal information
- Full name: Kari Puisto
- Born: 25 August 1945 (age 81) Karvia, Finland

Cycling career
- Sport: Cycling
- Role: Rider

Kari Bertil Puisto (born 25 August 1945) is a Finnish former racing cyclist. He won the Finnish national road race title in 1975 and 1976. He also competed at the 1980 Summer Olympics.
