= Rosa Törmänen =

Finnish cyclist

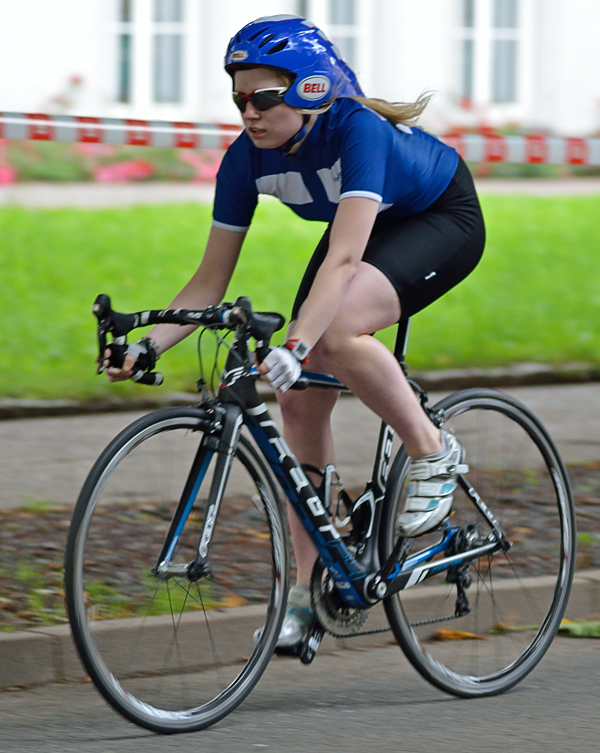
- Törmänen in 2012

Personal information
- Full name: Rosa Törmänen
- Born: 6 August 1992 (age 34)

Cycling career
- Sport: Cycling
- Role: Rider

Rosa Törmänen (born 6 August 1992) is a Finnish racing cyclist. She finished in second place in the Finnish National Road Race Championships in 2012.
