= Liina =

- Gender: Female
- Language: Estonian
- Name day: 22 June

Origin
- Region of origin: Estonia

Liina is an Estonian feminine given name and may refer to:

- Liina Brunelle (born 1978), actress
- Liina Karron (born 1974), chef
- Liina Kersna (born 1980), journalist and politician
- Liina Laasma (born 1992), javelin thrower
- Liina-Grete Lilender (born 1979), figure skater
- Liina Luik (born 1985), long-distance runner
- Liina Lukas (born 1970), literary scholar and translator
- Liina Olmaru (born 1967), actress
- Liina Reiman (1891–1961), actress
- Liina Suurvarik (born 1980), tennis player
- Liina Tennosaar (born 1965), actress
- Liina Tõnisson (born 1940), politician
- Liina Vahtrik (born 1972), actress
