= Teuvo Vilen =

Finnish footballer (born 1953)

Personal information
- Full name: Teuvo Veli-Pekka Vilen
- Date of birth: 26 November 1953 (age 72)
- Place of birth: Valkeakoski, Finland
- Position: Defender

Senior career*
Years	Team	Apps	(Gls)
1972–1986	Haka		

International career
1977–1980	Finland	6	(0)
- * Club domestic league appearances and goals

Teuvo Veli-Pekka Vilen (born 26 November 1953) is a Finnish footballer. He competed in the men's tournament at the 1980 Summer Olympics.
