= Mika Skyttä =

Finnish ice hockey player

- Born: April 25, 1973 (age 52) Varkaus, Finland
- Height: 6 ft 0 in (183 cm)
- Weight: 185 lb (84 kg; 13 st 3 lb)
- Position: Forward
- Shot: Right
- Played for: Herlev IC
- Playing career: 1992–2007

Mika Skyttä (born April 25, 1973, in Varkaus, Finland) is a retired Finnish professional ice hockey player. Skyttä began his career as a junior player with Tappara, one of the major Finnish ice hockey organisations. He played in the Jr. A SM-Liiga, the highest standard of junior hockey in Finland and in his first season, helped Tappara into the post season with 7 points in 15 regular season games. His form improved when the post-season arrived, and Skytta managed 10 points in 14 playoff games.

Despite this, Skyttä moved clubs and began to play regular hockey, again at junior level with Jokipojat, also in the A-Liiga. He again showed his point scoring prowess, totalling 39 points in just 36 games. It was the same season that he made his debut at senior standard, featuring in just one game at I Divisioona level. Skyttä featured more prominently at senior level the season after, 1994/95 although Joensuu were now icing at II Divisioona level. Again Skyttä proved his quality in the post season, helping Joensuu back to the division above with 21 points in 16 games.

This form ensured Skyttä's place as a regular first team player for the 1995/96 season, and Skyttä went on to score 40 points in 44 regular season I Divisioona level. His form was noticed by SaiPa, a team icing in the SM-liiga, the highest standard of hockey in Finland. Skyttä had a slow start playing for his new team, and despite icing in 50 games in the 1996/97 season scored just 3 points. Despite this, Skyttä was re-signed for the season after, and again proved to be a regular player, icing in 43 games and helping SaiPa into the post-season.

Skyttä went on to be a popular player in Lappeenranta and would stay with SaiPa for a total of seven seasons. He proved to be a reliable player, rarely missing games. Skyttä's consistency led to him becoming a firm favourite with the fans, and he would be an honest, if not spectacular point scorer. After his lengthy stay in Lappeenranta, Skyttä moved again for the beginning of the 2003/04 season to play for HPK, also in the SM-Liiga. Skyttä stayed for 18 games with the new team, before a mid-season move to the Manchester Phoenix of the EIHL, where he played alongside fellow Finn Petteri Lotila.

It was Skyttä's first season playing hockey outside his native Finland, but despite this he flourished and managed to score 20 points in 37 regular season games, as well as 2 points in 6 play off contests. Unfortunately for Skyttä, the Manchester organisation temporarily suspended playing activity in the summer of 2004, due to ongoing financial difficulties stemming from the high costs encountered from hiring the M.E.N. Arena in Manchester.

Skyttä was forced to return home, and on arriving back in Finland was re-signed for SaiPa. He would go on to make over 100 appearances in his second spell over a two-season period, scoring 24 points during that time. Skyttä made an emotional departure from Kisapuisto at the end of the 2005/06 season though. He played his final professional season with Herlev IC, a Danish team icing in the Danish Elitserien. He signed off with one of his best seasons in terms of point production, and finished with 25 points in 32 games before retiring from playing professional standard ice hockey.

== Career statistics ==
			Regular season					Playoffs				
Season	Team	League	GP	G	A	Pts	PIM	GP	G	A	Pts	PIM
1992–93	Tappara	Jr. A SM-Liiga	15	2	5	7	0	14	6	4	10	4
1993–94	Jokipojat	Jr. A SM-Liiga	36	15	24	39	14	-	-	-	-	-
1993–94	Jokipojat	I Divisioona	1	0	0	0	0	5	3	1	4	2
1994–95	Jokipojat	II Divisioona	8	5	5	10	2	16	10	11	21	6
1995–96	Jokipojat	I Divisioona	44	16	24	40	32	6	1	3	4	2
1996–97	SaiPa	SM-liiga	50	3	0	3	14	-	-	-	-	-
1997–98	SaiPa	SM-liiga	43	1	5	6	16	3	0	0	0	0
1998–99	SaiPa	SM-liiga	52	9	8	17	18	7	0	2	2	10
1999–00	SaiPa	SM-liiga	52	10	5	15	42	-	-	-	-	-
2000–01	SaiPa	SM-liiga	56	17	13	30	32	-	-	-	-	-
2001–02	SaiPa	SM-liiga	56	12	11	23	26	-	-	-	-	-
2002–03	SaiPa	SM-liiga	48	4	10	14	12	-	-	-	-	-
2003–04	HPK	SM-liiga	18	0	2	2	10	-	-	-	-	-
2003–04	Manchester Phoenix	EIHL	37	9	11	20	16	6	0	2	2	10
2004–05	SaiPa	SM-liiga	56	4	11	15	24	-	-	-	-	-
2005–06	SaiPa	SM-liiga	51	3	6	9	28	8	0	0	0	2
2006–07	Herlev IC	Danish Elitserien	32	9	16	25	36	-	-	-	-	-
