= Jorma Korpela =

Finnish modern pentathlete

Jorma Korpela (born 22 December 1960) is a Finnish modern pentathlete. He competed at the 1984 Summer Olympics.
