= The Latvian Institute of International Affairs =

Latvian think tank and research center

Latvian Institute of International Affairs
- Latvijas Ārpolitikas institūts
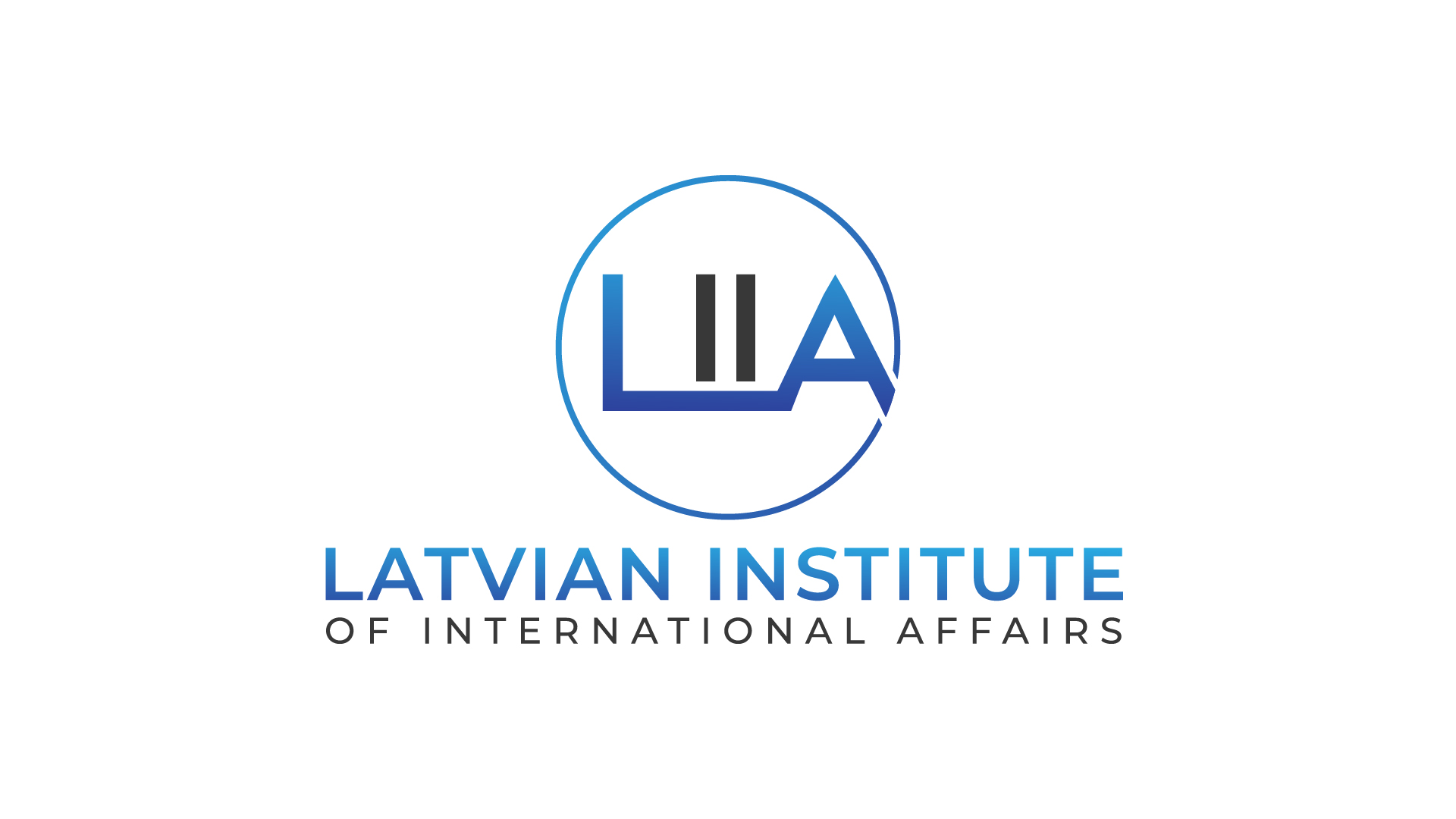
- Abbreviation: LIIA
- Founder: Atis Lejiņš
- Type: International Relations Think Tank
- Headquarters: Pils iela 21, Centra rajons, Riga, Latvia
- Director: Kārlis Bukovskis
- Website: www.liia.lv/en/

The Latvian Institute of International Affairs (Latvian: Latvijas Ārpolitikas Institūts) is an oldest research center and think tank in Latvia. Founded on May 20, 1992, the organization seeks to provide “Latvia's decision-makers, experts, and the wider public with analysis, recommendations, and information about international developments, regional security issues, and foreign policy strategy and choices.” The Institute develops and publishes research, organises high-level international conferences and promotes cooperation with Latvian and foreign research institutions. The LIIA is a nonprofit and does not receive regular government funding. LIIA’s funding is project-based. Its projects are funded through close cooperation with a range of other organisations and foundations, both Latvian and foreign. The Institute implements international cooperation projects within the European Commission's Horizon Europe and Erasmus+ programs. International projects are also funded by such recognisable supporters as the National Endowment for Democracy, Freedom House, the German Marshall Fund of the United States, the Nordic Council of Ministers, the Konrad Adenauer Stiftung, EEA and Norway Grants. LIIA’s research focuses on important topics such as Latvian foreign policy; transatlantic relations; security issues in the Baltic Sea region; European Union policies, including its neighborhood policy and Eastern Partnership; and multilateral and bilateral relations with Russia.

While the LIIA is a non-governmental organization, they do advise the Latvian Parliament, as well as other decision-making bodies within and outside of Latvia. The current director (since 2022) of LIIA is Karlis Bukovskis.

== History ==
The Latvian Institute of International Affairs is the oldest and best-known think-tank contributing to the development of Latvian foreign policy regularly cooperating with and providing expert advice on foreign affairs issues to the institutions implementing Latvia's foreign policy. In 1992, the Institute was founded by its first director, Atis Lejins, who led the association until 2011, when Andris Spruds became its director.

The LIIA team consists of more than 20 researchers and associate researchers with expertise in various areas of international relations, including foreign policy and security issues, European Union and EU external relations dynamics, and intercontinental connectivity initiatives. Many of Latvia's most recognizable international relations experts, including Daina Bleiere, Žaneta Ozoliņa, Toms Rostoks, Valts Kalniņš, Māris Andžāns, Imants Lieģis, Aldis Austers and many others have historically worked in the Institute. LIIA was initially funded through several grants from the Swedish government with the aim of supporting research on the security of the Baltic States.

== Conferences and Publications ==
The Latvian Institute of International Affairs publishes various research papers on topical issues such as Latvian foreign policy, multilateral and bilateral relations with Russia and China, transatlantic relations, security issues in the Baltic Sea region, European Union policy and political challenges. Conferences are held and various international research projects are organised often in coordination with partners of LIIA. Among the most important high-level international conferences organized by the Latvian Institute of International Affairs and its partners are well-known events such as the “Riga Dialogue”, “The EU Conversations”, and the “Riga Security Forum.” Various books and publications are also being issued.

== Latvian Foreign and Security Policy Yearbook ==
The first Latvian Foreign and Security Policy Yearbook was published in 2014, with the aim of raising awareness of Latvia's place and potential in the international system. Each publication describes the country's foreign and security policy over the past year. The Yearbooks bring together the views of different authors on current issues in Latvia's foreign policy, present the main drivers of Latvia's foreign policy, outline different views on possible future developments in foreign policy, as well as introduce additional themes and make recommendations.

== Riga Dialogue ==
The Riga Dialogue annually gathers high-level policy-makers and experts from the European Union, the United States, and the neighboring countries aiming to discuss current challenges to Euro-Atlantic security and provide policy recommendations for building a more stable security environment. The Riga Dialogue explores the future of the EU and NATO and relations with Russia. These meetings provide an opportunity for prominent political researchers and thinkers in Europe to discuss current events and promote mutual cooperation.

== The EU Conversations ==
The EU Conversations (TEUC) is a high-level international conference held annually since 2016 to discuss the most actual issues in the European Union in light of the new geopolitical situation. The main objective of TEUC is to foster discussion between young people, decision-makers and experts from across the EU. TEUC are organised by the LIIA in cooperation with the European Commission’s Representation in Latvia, the Parliament of the Republic of Latvia, International Centre for Defence and Security (ICDS), Think Tank Europa, Vilnius University Institute of International Relations and Political Science (TSPMI), Finnish Institute of International Affairs (FIIA), Swedish Institute of International Affairs (UI) and Institut für Europäische Politik (IEP) in Germany. TEUC and its sessions take place in Riga and are broadcast simultaneously on the same day from six countries, making it possible for everyone to listen and participate, wherever they are.

== "Riga Security Forum” discussion series ==
The Riga Security Forum was established in 2019. The COVID pandemic has given the Riga Security Forum a unique format - thematic panels are organised annually between October and December. During this time, discussions between policymakers, industry leaders, and military and civilian experts are recorded and published in audio and video format in both English and Latvian. The Riga Security Forum is a high-level event that seeks to create a platform for the exchange of ideas on topical security issues, promoting dialogue between policymakers and implementers, think tanks, businesses and the wider public. Each year, the Riga Security Forum produces at least 10 episodes, each dedicated to a topic of global interest at the time. Video and audio podcasts focus on so-called "traditional" or conventional security threats, including relations with Russia, transatlantic relations and China's growing influence, as well as "unconventional" or non-conventional security challenges, such as climate change, technological developments, gender and other issues. The discussions have been published on the LIIA website, the LIIA YouTube account, social media accounts Facebook, Twitter, as well as on Apple podcasts and Spotify platforms.

== Belarus Research Network on Neighborhood Policy ==
The Belarus Research Network on Neighborhood Policy was established in 2022. It is a project that was set up to create a network of experts from the Baltic States, Nordic countries and Belarus to promote support for a democratic Belarus. The project organises events, networks experts and decision-makers, and informs a wider audience on issues of concern to Belarus. It also publishes "Bimonthly Reviews" and "Analytical Articles." These publications include high-level expert analysis on issues of importance to Belarus. Project is funded by the Nordic Council of Ministers.

== The Asia Research Programme ==
The LIIA Asia Research Programme was launched in July 2017. The Programme is led by Una Aleksandra Berzina-Cerenkova. Within the Asia Research Programme, LIIA assesses and guides Latvia's engagement in developing a common European approach to the Indo-Pacific region, as well as strengthening Baltic expertise on East Asia, South Asia and South-East Asia. The programme builds knowledge on the domestic and foreign policies of China and other countries in the region, as well as their role in global governance institutions.

== European Union Program ==
The European Union Program aims primarily to provide analysis and expertise on topical EU issues for the public and decision-makers. The scope of the EU Program is built on a number of cornerstones, firstly projects. LIIA works closely with other European think tanks and universities as well as EU Institutions in writing and implementing projects under EU grants such as Horizon “InvigoratEU” and CERV. Second, publications. Within the EU Program, LIIA continues to publish books, analyses and online commentaries. Thirdly, high-level international conferences and events to build a better dialogue with the public in Latvia and Europe. The EU Program organises events in cooperation with partners and LIIA researchers participate in conferences representing Latvia and their expertise. In addition, LIIA is also part of “The Transeuropean Policy Studies Association” (TEPSA). In the framework of the cooperation, not only projects (Horizon, CERV, LIFE grants) are implemented, but also various studies are carried out for the European Parliament and the European Commission. In addition, LIIA researchers and associate researchers contribute to The European Council Experts' Debrief (EUCO Debrief), providing high-level analysis and expertise in publications. The Head of the LIIA European Union Program is Vineta Kleinberga.

== The Middle East Research Programme ==
The Middle East Research Programme at the LIIA focuses on analyzing and understanding the complex political, economic, and social dynamics of the Middle East region. It aims to provide in-depth research and expert recommendations to inform Latvian and international policy-making. The program is part of the institute's broader mission to support Latvia's decision-makers and the public with a comprehensive analysis of global developments and regional security issues. The Head of the Middle East Research Programme is Sintija Broka.

== Research Networks and Partnerships ==
The Latvian Institute of International Affairs cooperates with European and global partners in the framework of various international scientific bodies. Research activities, conferences, seminars and lecture programs have been organised in cooperation with:

- The Parliament of the Republic of Latvia - www.saeima.lv
- Ministry of Foreign Affairs of Latvia - https://www.mfa.gov.lv/en
- Friedrich-Ebert-Stiftung - www.fes-baltic.org
- Konrad-Adenauer-Stiftung- www.kas.de/wf/en/
- Nordic Council of Ministers - www.norden.lv
- NATO Public Diplomacy Department - https://www.nato.int/
- European Commission Representation in Latvia https://latvia.representation.ec.europa.eu/index_lv
- Embassies of EU and NATO countries

LIIA is a member of the following think tank networks:

- The Transeuropean Policy Studies Association (TEPSA) - www.tepsa.be
- The EU Non-Proliferation Consortium - www.nonproliferation.eu
- Euro-Mediterranean Study Commission (EuroMesCo) - www.euromesco.net
- European Policy Institutes Network on the Future of Europe Debate (EPIN) - www.epin.org
- IRSEC Hub - http://irsec-hub.org/
- China in Europe Research Network - https://china-in-europe.net
- Organization for Security and Co-operation in Europe - https://www.osce.org/networks
- European Think-Tank Network on China - https://etnc.info
- China Observers in Central and Eastern Europe (CHOICE) - https://chinaobservers.eu
