= Sirpa Ahlroos-Kouko =

Finnish cyclist

Personal information
- Full name: Sirpa Ahlroos-Kouko
- Born: 5 November 1975 (age 50)

Cycling career
- Sport: Cycling
- Role: Rider

Sirpa Ahlroos-Kouko (born 5 November 1975) is a Finnish former racing cyclist. She won the Finnish national road race title in 2000.
