= Joonas Henttala =

Finnish cyclist

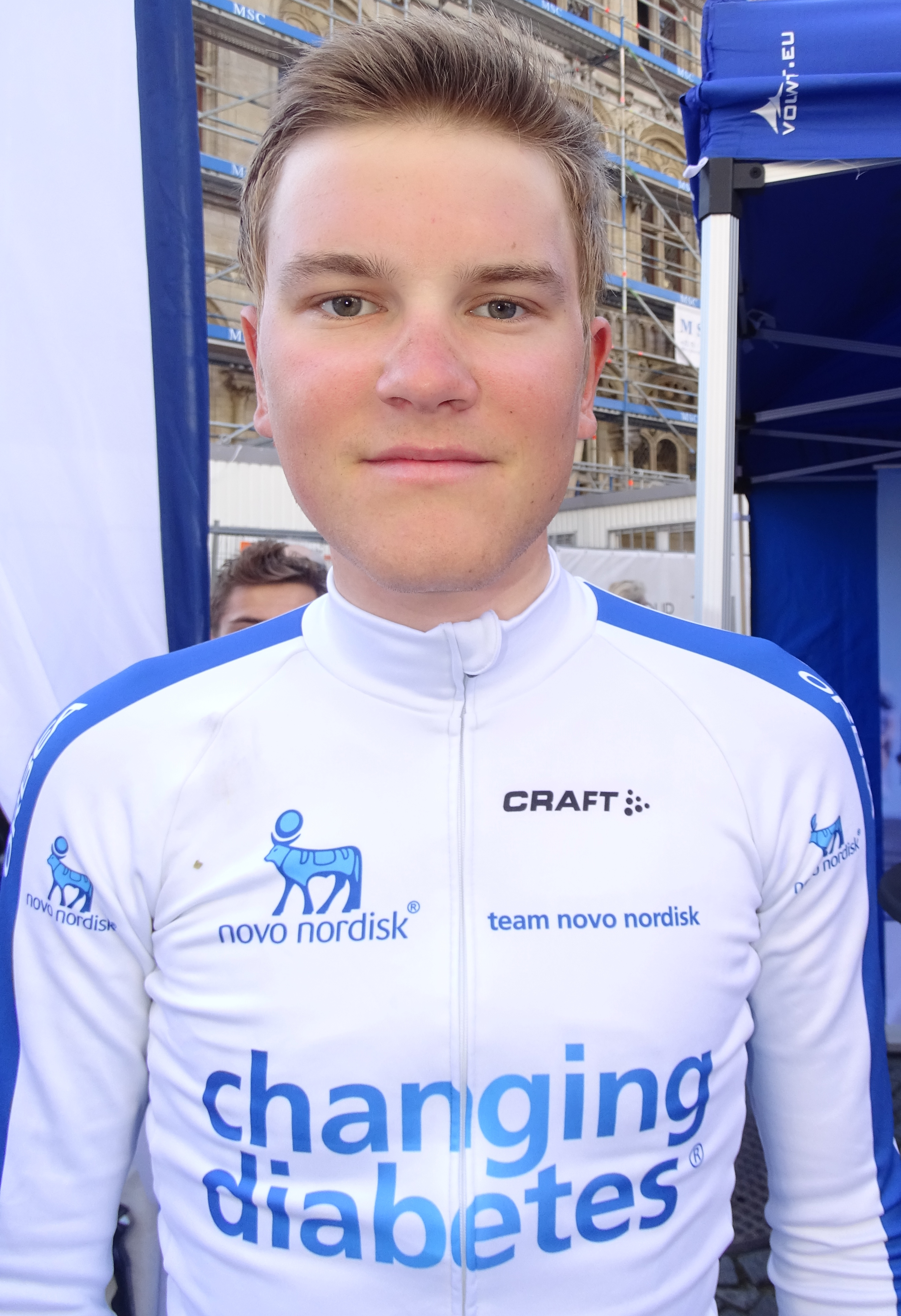
- Henttala at the 2015 Brabantse Pijl.

Personal information
- Full name: Joonas Henttala
- Born: 17 September 1991 (age 35) Porvoo, Finland
- Height: 1.87 m (6 ft 2 in)
- Weight: 73 kg (161 lb)

Cycling career
- Sport: Cycling
- Current team: Retired
- Discipline: Road
- Role: Rider

Professional team
- 2013–2023: Team Novo Nordisk

Major wins
- National Road Race Championships (2021)

Joonas Henttala (born 17 September 1991) is a Finnish former professional racing cyclist, who competed as a professional for UCI ProTeam Team Novo Nordisk from 2013 to 2023.

== Major results ==
2011
2nd Road race, National Road Championships
2014
2nd Road race, National Road Championships
2020
3rd Road race, National Road Championships
2021
1st Road race, National Road Championships
