= Juha Rissanen =

Finnish footballer (born 1958)

Personal information
- Date of birth: 13 November 1958 (age 67)
- Place of birth: Kuopio, Finland
- Position: Defender

International career
Years	Team	Apps	(Gls)
- Finland

Juha Rissanen (born 13 November 1958) is a Finnish footballer. He competed in the men's tournament at the 1980 Summer Olympics.
