= Olli Isoaho =

Finnish footballer (born 1956)

Personal information
- Full name: Olli Matias Isoaho
- Date of birth: 2 March 1956 (age 70)
- Place of birth: Kerava, Finland
- Height: 1.89 m (6 ft 2 in)
- Position: Goalkeeper

Senior career*
Years	Team	Apps	(Gls)
1973–1975	Helsingin Ponnistus		
1976–1982	HJK Helsinki	127	(1)
1982–1983	Arminia Bielefeld	15	(0)
1983–1984	Seiko		
1985–1987	Västerås SK	77	(0)
1988	Moss	20	(0)
1989–1990	Västerås SK	47	(0)
1991	FC Kontu	17	(0)

International career
1980–1986	Finland	14	(0)
- * Club domestic league appearances and goals

Olli Isoaho (born 2 March 1956) is a Finnish former professional footballer who played as a goalkeeper. He competed in the men's tournament at the 1980 Summer Olympics.

== Career ==
Isoaho joined Bundesliga side Arminia Bielefeld in summer 1982. On 6 November 1982, he played in Bielefeld's 11–1 loss to Borussia Dortmund, conceding ten goals in the second half. He made 15 appearances for the club.
