= Martti Järventaus =

Finnish swimmer

Personal information
- Full name: Martti Sakari Järventaus
- Nickname: "Mara"
- Nationality: Finnish
- Born: December 16, 1960 (age 65) Kotka, Finland
- Height: 1.84 m (6 ft 0 in)
- Weight: 72 kg (159 lb)

Sport
- Sport: Swimming
- Strokes: Breaststroke
- Club: Lappeenrannan Uimarit

Martti Järventaus (born December 16, 1960, in Kotka, Finland) is a retired male breaststroke swimmer from Finland. He competed twice for his native country at the Summer Olympics: in 1980 and 1984.
