= Jaakko Minkkinen =

Finnish sports shooter

Personal information
- Born: 28 July 1933 (age 92) Äänekoski, Finland

Sport
- Sport: Sports shooting
- Club: Ylä-Vuoksen Ampujat
Medal record
Representing Finland
World Championships
Bronze medal – third place	1978 Seoul	300 m team standard rifle
Bronze medal – third place	1978 Seoul	300 m team rifle three positions

Jaakko Otto Sakari Minkkinen (born 28 July 1933) is a Finnish former sports shooter. He competed at the 1968, 1972 and the 1976 Summer Olympics.
