= Immo Huhtinen =

Finnish sports shooter

Personal information
- Born: 30 August 1932 Viipuri, Finland
- Died: 1 June 1998 (aged 65) Raisio, Finland

Sport
- Sport: Sports shooting

Immo Huhtinen (30 August 1932 – 1 June 1998) was a Finnish sports shooter. He competed at the 1964, 1968 and the 1972 Summer Olympics.
