= Patrick Wackström =

Finnish cyclist

Personal information
- Full name: Patrick Wackström
- Born: 6 September 1958 (age 68) Porvoo, Finland

Cycling career
- Sport: Cycling
- Role: Rider

Patrick Wackström (born 6 September 1958) is a Finnish former racing cyclist. He won the Finnish national road race title in 1980 and 1981. He also competed at the 1980 and 1984 Summer Olympics.
