= Martti Ketelä =

Finnish modern pentathlete

Personal information
- Born: 24 October 1944 Kotka, Finland
- Died: 26 June 2002 (aged 57) Helsinki, Finland

Sport
- Sport: Modern pentathlon
Medal record
Men's modern pentathlon
Representing Finland
Olympic Games
Bronze medal – third place	1972 Munich	Team

Martti Einar Ketelä (24 October 1944 – 26 June 2002) was a Finnish modern pentathlete who competed at the 1968 Summer Olympics and the 1972 Summer Olympics.
