= Ole Wackström =

Finnish cyclist

Personal information
- Full name: Ole Wackström
- Born: 20 September 1932 Porvoo, Finland
- Died: 8 April 2015 (aged 82)

Cycling career
- Sport: Cycling
- Role: Rider

Ole Wackström (20 September 1932 – 8 April 2015) was a Finnish racing cyclist. He won the Finnish national road race title in 1957. He also competed at the 1968 and 1972 Summer Olympics. He died in 2015.
