= Pentti Koskinen =

Finnish diver (1943–2023)

Personal information
- Nationality: Finnish
- Born: 24 July 1943; Jyväskylä, Finland
- Died: 8 March 2023 (aged 79); Espoo, Finland

Sport
- Sport: Diving

Pentti Koskinen (24 July 1943 – 8 March 2023) was a Finnish diver. He competed at the 1964 Summer Olympics, the 1968 Summer Olympics and the 1972 Summer Olympics.
