= Sixten Wackström =

Finnish cyclist

Personal information
- Born: 2 August 1960 (age 66) Porvoo, Finland

Cycling career
- Sport: Cycling

Sixten Wackström (born 2 August 1960) is a Finnish former cyclist. He competed at the 1980 Summer Olympics and the 1984 Summer Olympics.
