= Pasi Hulkkonen =

Finnish modern pentathlete

Personal information
- Born: 18 January 1961 (age 65) Orimattila, Finland

Sport
- Sport: Modern pentathlon

Pasi Hulkkonen (born 18 January 1961) is a Finnish modern pentathlete. He competed at the 1984 Summer Olympics.
