= Harry Hannus =

Finnish cyclist (born 1949)

Personal information
- Full name: Harry Hannus
- Born: 20 December 1949 (age 76) Porvoo, Finland

Cycling career
- Sport: Cycling
- Role: Rider

Harry Hannus (born 20 December 1949) is a Finnish former racing cyclist. He won the Finnish national road race title seven times between 1972 and 1984. He also competed at four consecutive Olympic Games between 1972 and 1984.
