= Raimo Suikkanen =

Finnish cyclist (1942–2021)

Personal information
- Born: 20 December 1942 Iitti, Finland
- Died: 22 January 2021 (aged 78)

Cycling career
- Sport: Cycling

Raimo Suikkanen (20 December 1942 – 22 January 2021) was a Finnish racing cyclist. He competed at the 1968 Summer Olympics and the 1972 Summer Olympics.
