= Mauno Uusivirta =

Finnish cyclist

Personal information
- Full name: Mauno Uusivirta
- Born: 27 September 1948 (age 78) Toholampi, Finland

Cycling career
- Sport: Cycling
- Role: Rider

Mauno Uusivirta (born 27 September 1948) is a Finnish former racing cyclist. He won the Finnish national road race title in 1970. He also competed at the 1968, 1972 and 1980 Summer Olympics.
