= 2007 UCI Road World Championships – Men's time trial =

Cycling race

Men's Individual Time Trial
2007 UCI Road World Championships
- Rainbow jersey

Race details
- Dates: 2007-09-27 in (Germany) Stuttgart (GER)
- Stages: 1
- Distance: 44.9 km (27.9 mi)
- Winning time: 00h 54' 41"

Results
	Winner	Fabian Cancellara (SUI)	(Switzerland)
	Second	László Bodrogi (HUN)	(Hungary)
	Third	Stef Clement (NED)	(Netherlands)

The 2007 edition of the UCI Road World Championships Time Trial took place on September 27. The Championships was hosted by the German city of Stuttgart, and featured two laps of an urban circuit, amounting to 44.9 kilometres of racing against the clock.

This time trial was shorter than that of the 2006 edition in Salzburg, which was won by Swiss Fabian Cancellara.

== Final classification ==
Rank	Rider	Time
1st place, gold medalist(s)	(Switzerland) Fabian Cancellara (SUI)	00:55.41,35
2nd place, silver medalist(s)	(Hungary) László Bodrogi (HUN)	+ 0.52,1
3rd place, bronze medalist(s)	(Netherlands) Stef Clement (NED)	+ 0.57,8
4.	(Germany) Bert Grabsch (GER)	+ 1.12,2
5.	(Germany) Sebastian Lang (GER)	+ 1.17,5
6.	(Russia) Vladimir Gusev (RUS)	+ 1.47,0
7.	(Spain) Iván Gutiérrez (ESP)	+ 1.56,2
8.	(Kazakhstan) Andrey Mizurov (KAZ)	+ 2.02,7
9.	(Belarus) Vasil Kiryienka (BLR)	+ 2.03,5
10.	(United Kingdom) Bradley Wiggins (GBR)	+ 2.10,8
11.	(Belgium) Dominique Cornu (BEL)	+ 2.11,0
12.	(United States) David Zabriskie (USA)	+ 2.13,9
13.	(Latvia) Raivis Belohvoščiks (LAT)	+ 2.19,8
14.	(Italy) Marco Pinotti (ITA)	+ 2.20,1
15.	(Sweden) Gustav Larsson (SWE)	+ 2.30,5
16.	(Finland) Matti Helminen (FIN)	+ 2.32,0
17.	(Belarus) Andrei Kunitski (BLR)	+ 2.38,0
18.	(United Kingdom) David Millar (GBR)	+ 2.40,1
19.	(Italy) Vincenzo Nibali (ITA)	+ 2.42,1
20.	(United States) Jason McCartney (USA)	+ 2.43,0
21.	(Russia) Vladimir Karpets (RUS)	+ .48,4
22.	(Ukraine) Andriy Hrivko (UKR)	+ 2.57,8
23.	(Belgium) Jurgen Van den Broeck (BEL)	+ 3.03,2
24.	(Canada) Ryder Hesjedal (CAN)	+ 3.07,9
25.	(Ukraine) Dmytro Grabovskyy (UKR)	+ 3.21,4
26.	(Argentina) Martín Garrido (ARG)	+ 3.22,8
27.	(Denmark) Brian Vandborg (DEN)	+ 3.26,2
28.	(France) Dimitri Champion (FRA)	+ 3.39,3
29.	(Australia) Ben Day (AUS)	+ 3.45,9
30.	(Canada) Svein Tuft (CAN)	+ 3.46,0
31.	(Australia) Cameron Wurf (AUS)	+ 3.48,9
32.	(Republic of Ireland) David McCann (IRL)	+ 3.49,5
33.	(Argentina) Matías Médici (ARG)	+ 3.50,1
34.	(France) Benoît Vaugrenard (FRA)	+ 4.00,3
35.	(Netherlands) Joost Posthuma (NED)	+ 4.00,8
36.	(Denmark) Lars Bak (DEN)	+ 4.04,3
37.	(Kyrgyzstan) Evgeny Vakker (KGZ)	+ 4.09,6
38.	(Australia) Adam Hansen (AUS)	+ 4.10,9
39.	(New Zealand) Glen Chadwick (NZL)	+ 4.12,9
40.	(China) Haijun Ma (CHN)	+ 4.30,7
41.	(Iran) Hossein Askari (IRI)	+ 4.32,8
42.	(Colombia) Víctor Hugo Peña (COL)	+ 4.42,0
43.	(Colombia) José Serpa (COL)	+ 4.48,9
44.	(South Africa) James Lewis Perry (RSA)	+ 4.52,7
45.	(Switzerland) Michael Schär (SUI)	+ 5.05,9
46.	(Spain) Luis León Sánchez (ESP)	+ 5.07,6
47.	(Switzerland) Simon Zahner (SUI)	+ 5.09,5
48.	(Japan) Fumiyuki Beppu (JPN)	+ 5.10,0
49.	(New Zealand) Gordon McCauley (NZL)	+ 5.11,5
50.	(Czech Republic) František Raboň (CZE)	+ 5.15,5
51.	(Norway) Knut Anders Fostervold (NOR)	+ 5.17,0
52.	(Poland) Maciej Bodnar (POL)	+ 5.24,0
53.	(Czech Republic) Stanislav Kozubek (CZE)	+ 5.25,2
54.	(Poland) Łukasz Bodnar (POL)	+ 5.26,2
55.	(Austria) Rupert Probst (AUT)	+ 5.42,9
56.	(Slovenia) Gregor Gazvoda (SLO)	+ 5.43,2
57.	(Portugal) Ricardo Martins (POR)	+ 5.52,0
58.	(South Africa) David George (RSA)	+ 6.01,5
59.	(Finland) Jarmo Rissanen (FIN)	+ 6.31,0
60.	(Bulgaria) Evgeniy Gerganov (BUL)	+ 6.37,5
61.	(Uzbekistan) Vladimir Tuychiev (UZB)	+ 6.38,4
62.	(Namibia) Dan Craven (NAM)	+ 6.39,2
63.	(Slovenia) Kristjan Fajt (SLO)	+ 7.16,4
64.	(Namibia) Erik Hoffmann (NAM)	+ 7.22,1
65.	(China) Baoqing Song (CHN)	+ 7.29,1
66.	(Moldova) Igor Pugaci (MDA)	+ 8.35,2
67.	(Hungary) Zoltán Madaras (HUN)	+ 9.13,5
68.	(Uzbekistan) Muradjan Khalmuratov (UZB)	+ 9.22,4
69.	(Serbia) Dragan Spasic (SRB)	+ 9.46,6
