= 2006 UCI Road World Championships – Men's time trial =

Men's Individual Time Trial
2006 UCI Road World Championships
- Rainbow jersey

Race details
- Dates: 2006–09–21 in Salzburg (AUT)
- Stages: 1
- Distance: 50.83 km (31.58 mi)
- Winning time: 01h 00' 11"

Results
	Winner	Fabian Cancellara (Switzerland)
	Second	David Zabriskie (United States)
	Third	Alexander Vinokourov (Kazakhstan)

The Men's time trial at the 2006 UCI Road World Championships took place on September 21, 2006, in the Austrian city of Salzburg. The race was part of the UCI Road World Championships. Swiss rider Fabian Cancellara won the gold medal and the rainbow jersey as the 2006 World Time Trial Champion.

== Final classification ==
Rank	Rider	Time
1st place, gold medalist(s)	(Switzerland) Fabian Cancellara (SUI)	01:00.11
2nd place, silver medalist(s)	(United States) David Zabriskie (USA)	01:01.29
3rd place, bronze medalist(s)	(Kazakhstan) Alexander Vinokourov (KAZ)	01:01.49
4.	(Denmark) Brian Vandborg (DEN)	01:01.53
5.	(Germany) Sebastian Lang (GER)	01:02.08
6.	(Belarus) Vasil Kiryienka (BLR)	01:02.13
7.	(Belgium) Leif Hoste (BEL)	01:02.31
8.	(Australia) Michael Rogers (AUS)	01:02.31
9.	(Ukraine) Andriy Hrivko (UKR)	01:02.45
10.	(Russia) Vladimir Gusev (RUS)	01:02.53
11.	(Kazakhstan) Andrey Kashechkin (KAZ)	01:02.54
12.	(Latvia) Raivis Belohvoščiks (LAT)	01:02.57
13.	(Belgium) Stijn Devolder (BEL)	01:02.57
14.	(Spain) Iván Gutiérrez (ESP)	01:03.07
15.	(United Kingdom) David Millar (GBR)	01:03.21
16.	(Italy) Vincenzo Nibali (ITA)	01:03.27
17.	(South Africa) David George (RSA)	01:03.34
18.	(South Africa) Robert Hunter (RSA)	01:03.39
19.	(Hungary) László Bodrogi (HUN)	01:03.51
20.	(Italy) Marco Pinotti (ITA)	01:03.52
21.	(Australia) Benjamin Day (AUS)	01:03.53
22.	(Canada) Ryder Hesjedal (CAN)	01:04.12
23.	(Austria) Peter Luttenberger (AUT)	01:04.12
24.	(Netherlands) Stef Clement (NED)	01:04.16
25.	(Sweden) Gustav Larsson (SWE)	01:04.23
26.	(United States) Chris Baldwin (USA)	01:04.41
27.	(Germany) Andreas Klöden (GER)	01:04.42
28.	(Canada) Svein Tuft (CAN)	01:04.45
29.	(Sweden) Thomas Lövkvist (SWE)	01:04.59
30.	(Republic of Ireland) David O'Loughlin (IRL)	01:05.02
31.	(Russia) Alexander Bespalov (RUS)	01:05.05
32.	(Czech Republic) Ondřej Sosenka (CZE)	01:05.15
33.	(Ukraine) Yuriy Krivtsov (UKR)	01:05.16
34.	(Colombia) Marlon Pérez (COL)	01:05.27
35.	(Moldova) Ruslan Ivanov (MDA)	01:05.30
36.	(Costa Rica) José Adrián Bonilla (CRC)	01:05.32
37.	(Uzbekistan) Denis Shkarpeta (UZB)	01:05.45
38.	(Finland) Matti Helminen (FIN)	01:05.55
39.	(Republic of Ireland) David McCann (IRL)	01:06.01
40.	(Czech Republic) František Raboň (CZE)	01:06.17
41.	(France) Christophe Kern (FRA)	01:06.25
42.	(Netherlands) Joost Posthuma (NED)	01:06.37
43.	(Norway) Knut Anders Fostervold (NOR)	01:06.40
44.	(France) Benoît Vaugrenard (FRA)	01:06.42
45.	(Switzerland) Michael Schär (SUI)	01:06.44
46.	(Slovenia) Gregor Gazvoda (SLO)	01:07.00
47.	(Austria) Thomas Rohregger (AUT)	01:07.34
48.	(Brazil) Pedro Nicacio (BRA)	01:08.38
49.	(Namibia) Erik Hoffmann (NAM)	01:08.42
50.	(Slovakia) Zoltán Remák (SVK)	01:09.05
51.	(Hungary) Csaba Szekeres (HUN)	01:09.05
52.	(Latvia) Vitaly Kornilov (LAT)	01:12.13
—	(Poland) Peter Mazur (POL)	DNS

== Selected Riders ==
Each National Federation was allowed to enter 2 riders. In the end 53 riders were selected for the race, with Polish rider Piotr Mazur not starting, 52 riders effectively took part.

Country	Cyclist	Team
Australia	Michael Rogers	T-Mobile Team
Australia	Benjamin Day	Boavista team
Austria	Peter Luttenberger	Team CSC
Austria	Thomas Rohregger	Elk Haus-Simplon
Belarus	Vasil Kiryienka	Rietumu bank – Riga
Belgium	Stijn Devolder	Discovery Channel
Belgium	Leif Hoste	Discovery Channel
Brazil	Pedro Nicacio	Scott/Marcondes Cesar/Fadenp/SJC
Canada	Ryder Hesjedal	Phonak Hearing Systems
Canada	Svein Tuft	Symmetrics Cycling Team
Colombia	Marlon Pérez	Tenax
Costa Rica	José Adrián Bonilla	Comunidad Valenciana
Czech Republic	František Raboň	T-Mobile Team
Czech Republic	Ondřej Sosenka	Acqua & Sapone–Caffè Mokambo
Denmark	Brian Vandborg	Team CSC
Finland	Matti Helminen	Profel Ziegler Continental Team
France	Christophe Kern	Bouygues Télécom
France	Benoît Vaugrenard	Française des Jeux
Germany	Andreas Klöden	T-Mobile Team
Germany	Sebastian Lang	Team Gerolsteiner
United Kingdom	David Millar	Saunier Duval–Prodir
Hungary	László Bodrogi	Crédit Agricole
Hungary	Csaba Szekeres	P-Nivo Betonexpressz 2000 KFT.se
Ireland	David McCann	Giant Asia Racing Team
Ireland	David O'Loughlin	Navigators Insurance Cycling Team
Italy	Vincenzo Nibali	Liquigas
Italy	Marco Pinotti	Saunier Duval–Prodir
Kazakhstan	Andrey Kashechkin	Astana Team
Kazakhstan	Alexander Vinokourov	Astana Team
Latvia	Raivis Belohvoščiks	C.B. Immobiliare-Universal Caffe
Latvia	Vitaly Kornilov	Saaremaa Jalgrattaklubi Viiking
Moldova	Ruslan Ivanov	Unknown
Namibia	Erik Hoffmann	Team Lamonta
Netherlands	Stef Clement	Bouygues Télécom
Netherlands	Joost Posthuma	Rabobank
Norway	Knut Anders Fostervold	Team Hard Rocx
Poland	Peter Mazur	Saunier Duval–Prodir
Russia	Alexander Bespalov	Premier
Russia	Vladimir Gusev	Discovery Channel
Slovakia	Zoltan Remak	P-Nivo Betonexpressz 2000 KFT.se
Slovenia	Gregor Gazvoda	Perutnina Ptuj
South Africa	David George	Relax–GAM
South Africa	Robert Hunter	Phonak Hearing Systems
Spain	Iván Gutiérrez	Caisse d'Epargne–Illes Balears
Sweden	Gustav Larsson	Française des Jeux
Sweden	Thomas Lövkvist	Française des Jeux
Switzerland	Fabian Cancellara	Team CSC
Switzerland	Michael Schär	Phonak Hearing Systems
Ukraine	Andriy Hryvko	Team Milram
Ukraine	Yuriy Krivtsov	AG2R Prévoyance
United States	Chris Baldwin	Toyota–United Pro
United States	David Zabriskie	Team CSC
Uzbekistan	Denis Shkarpeta	Miche
