= 2006 national road cycling championships =

An example of the British, French, German and Italian national jerseys

Most of the 2006 national road cycling championships took place in June.

Although there were a few exceptions such as the Australian and American championships which took place in January and September respectively.

== Jerseys ==
The winner of each national championship wears the national jersey in all their races for the next year in the respective discipline, apart from the World Championships.

The jerseys tend to represent the countries' flag or use the colours from it.

== 2006 National Champions ==
Country	Men's Elite		Women's Elite		Men's U-23	
Country	Road Race	Time Trial	Road Race	Time Trial	Road Race	Time Trial
Angola	Walter Da Silva	Igor Silva				
(Antigua and Barbuda) Antigua & Barb.	Lynn Murray					
Argentina	Armando Borrajo	Matías Médici	Valeria R. Pintos	Monica Santapa	Javier Salas	Federico Pagani
Australia	Russell Van Hout	Nathan O'Neill	Katherine Bates	Kathryn Watt	William Walker	Shaun Higgerson
Austria	Bernhard Kohl	Peter Luttenberger	Christiane Soeder	Christiane Soeder	Matthias Schröger	Stefan Denifl
Bahamas	Johnny Hoyte					
Bahrain	Mohammed Husain	Taha Alawi				
Belarus	A. Kuschynski	Vasil Kiryienka			Siarhei Daubniuk	Branislau Samoilau
Belgium	Niko Eeckhout	Leif Hoste	Veronique Belleter	An Van Rie	Greg Van Avermaet	Dominique Cornu
Brazil	Soelito Gohr	Pedro Nicacio				
Bulgaria	Ivaïlo Gabrovski	Ivaïlo Gabrovski				Stefan Kushlev
Burkina Faso	Rabaki J. Ouédraogo					
Canada	Dominique Rollin	Svein Tuft	Alex Wrubleski	Alex Wrubleski		David Veilleux
China	Baoqing Song	Baoqing Song	Mei Fang Li	Mei Fang Li		
Colombia	Alejandro Cortés	Libardo Niño	Magdaly Trujillo	Monica Méndez	Jaime Castañeda	Fabio Duarte
Costa Rica	Henry Raabe	Henry Raabe				
Croatia	Hrvoje Miholjević	Matija Kvasina				
Cuba	Arnold Alcolea	Arnold Alcolea	Yeilien Fernandez	Yuliet Rodriguez		
Czech Republic	Stanislav Kozubek	Ondřej Sosenka	Lada Kozlíková	Lada Kozlíková	Pavel Zitta	Lukas Sablik
Denmark	Allan Johansen	Brian Vandborg	Linda S. Villumsen	Linda S. Villumsen	Kasper Jebjerg	Alex Rasmussen
(Dominican Republic) Dominican Rep.	Stalin Quiterio					
El Salvador	Carlos E. A. Garcia	Geovany Guervara	Evelyn García	Evelyn García	Christian Poritlo	Maeio Contreras
Estonia	Erki Pütsep	Jaan Kirsipuu	Grete Treier	Grete Treier	Andrei Mustonen	Rein Taaramäe
Finland	Jussi Veikkanen	Matti Helminen	Maija Laurila	Paula Suominen		
France	Florent Brard	Sylvain Chavanel	J. Longo-Ciprelli	J. Longo-Ciprelli		
Germany	Dirk Müller	Sebastian Lang	Claudia Häusler			
Greece	Ioannis Tamouridis	Elpidofos Potouridis	A. Pastourmatzi	Elisabert Chantzi		Christos Delidimitriou
Honduras	Armando Orellana	Armando Orellana				
Hong Kong	Jingwei Zhang	Jingwei Zhang				
Hungary	László Bodrogi	László Bodrogi	Mónika Király	Diana Pulsfort		Akos Haisker
Iran	Ahad K. Sarai	Ghader M. Iranagh				
Ireland	David McCann	David O'Loughlin	Siobhan Dervan	Louise Moriaty	Paidi O'Brien	Ryan Connor
Israel	Dor Dviri	Gali Ronen	Inbar Ronen	Shani Bloch		
Italy	Paolo Bettini	Marzio Bruseghin	Fabiana Luperini	Silvia Valsecchi	Francessco Gavazzi	Alan Marangoni
Ivory Coast	Abdoulaye Traore	Issiaka Fofana				
Japan	Fumiyuki Beppu	Fumiyuki Beppu	Miho Oki	Miho Oki	Yukiya Arashiro	Takeshi Ikeda
Kazakhstan	Andrey Kashechkin	Maxim Iglinskiy	Zoulfia Zabirova	Zoulfia Zabirova	Roman Kireyev	Dmitriy Gruzdev
Latvia	Aleksejs Saramotins	Raivis Belohvoščiks			Gatis Smukulis	Gatis Smukulis
Lebanon			Lina Rahme	Lina Rahme		
Lithuania	Dainius Kairelis	Ignatas Konovalovas	Diana Žiliūtė	Edita Pučinskaitė		
Luxembourg	Kim Kirchen	Christian Poos	Isabelle Hoffman	Anne-Marie Schmitt	Ben Gastaeur	Nick Clesen
Mexico	Juan J. Monsivais	Fausto Esparza	G. Grassi Herrera	G. Grassi Herrera	Luis Pulido Naranjo	Imar Cervabtes Diaz
Mongolia	J. Ulzii-Orshikh	J. Ulzii-Orshikh	J. Ulziisolongo	J. Ulziisolongo		
Morocco	Abdelatif Saadoune					
Namibia	Dan Craven					
Netherlands	Michael Boogerd	Stef Clement	Marianne Vos	Loes Gunnewijk	Kai Reus	Kai Reus
New Zealand	Hayden Roulston	Marc Ryan	Catherine Cheatley	Alison Shanks	Joseph Cooper	Clinton Avery
Norway	Lars P. Nordhaug	Kurt Asle Arvesen	Linn Torp	Anny Hauglid	Anders Iversby	
Poland	Mariusz Witecki	Piotr Mazur	Maja Włoszczowska	Michał Gołas	Maciej Bodnar	
Portugal	Bruno Pires	Helder Miranda	Isabel Caetano	Alice C. Azevedo	Vitor Rodrigues	Tiago Machado
Qatar	Said Mossa					
Romania	Marian Frunzeanu	Laszlo Madaras			Marius Petrache	
Russia	A. Khatuntsev	Alexander Bespalov	Olga Slyusareva	Olga Slyusareva	Evgeny Sokolov	Maxim Belkov
Saudi Arabia	Fathy Al Musalum	Fathy Al Musalum				
Serbia	Ivan Stević					
Slovenia	Jure Golčer	Kristjan Fajt	not organized	Katja Šorli	Grega Bole	Kristijan Koren
Slovakia	Maroš Kovác	Matej Jurčo	Zuzana Vojtášová	Katarína Uhláriková	Martin Velits	Peter Velits
South Africa	Jacques Fullard	David George	Anriette Schoeman	C. Slingerland	John-Lee Augustyn	Hanco Kachelhoffer
Spain	Not contested	Toni Tauler	María Isabel Moreno	E. Iturriagaechevarria	José Aguilera	Javier Chacon
Sweden	Thomas Lövkvist	Gustav Larsson	Susanne Ljungskog	Susanne Ljungskog		
Switzerland	Grégory Rast	Fabian Cancellara	Annette Beutler		Maxime Beney	
Turkey	Bilal Akgül		Esra Kürkçü		Recep Ünalan	
Ukraine	Vladimir Zagorodniy	Andriy Hrivko	E. Bochkaryova	Iryna Shpylyova	Vitaliy Kondrut	O. Surutkovych
(United Arab Emirates) UAE	Shambih Khaled Ali	Alsabbagh Humaid				
United Kingdom	Hamish Haynes	Jason MacIntyre	Nicole Cooke	Rebecca Romero	Peter Bissell	Daniel Davies
United States	George Hincapie	David Zabriskie	Kristin Armstrong	Kristin Armstrong	Craig Lewis	Brent Bookwalter
Uzbekistan	Sergey Lagutin	Nikolay Kazakbaev				
Venezuela	Manuel Medina	Tomás Gil	Maria Briceno	Naielys García	Tomás Terecen	Víctor Moreno
Zimbabwe	Brian Zengeni	Dave Martin				

Note: In some cases the U23 champion is the highest placed U23 rider in the elite men's race.
