= Cycling at the 2008 Summer Olympics – Men's road time trial =

Men's cycling road time trial at the Games of the XXIX Olympiad
- Olympic Road cycling
- Venue: Urban Road Cycling Course; 47.6 km (29.6 mi)
- Date: August 13
- Competitors: 39 from 29 nations
- Winning time: 1:02:11; 46.05 km/h (28.61 mph)

Medalists
1st place, gold medalist(s)		Fabian Cancellara	Switzerland
2nd place, silver medalist(s)		Gustav Larsson	Sweden
3rd place, bronze medalist(s)		Levi Leipheimer	United States

The Men's road time trial at the 2008 Summer Olympics took place on 13 August at the Urban Road Cycling Course. It was won by Fabian Cancellara of Switzerland.

== Pre-race favorites ==
Included among the favorites for victory were Cancellara, the reigning world time trial champion, and Germany's Stefan Schumacher, who won both time trials in the 2008 Tour de France, defeating Cancellara in each. Other cyclists considered to be possible medalists included American Dave Zabriskie, and Australians Michael Rogers and Cadel Evans. Evans had originally announced that he was withdrawing from the time trial with a knee injury, giving his place in the event to Rogers, but he recovered faster than expected. The UCI thus gave him a wildcard entry to let him compete. American Levi Leipheimer, Spaniard Alberto Contador, Italy's Marzio Bruseghin and Denis Menchov of Russia were also thought to be contenders for the podium.

== The event ==
The men's road time trial took place on a mountainous 47.6 km course consisting of two 23.8 km laps each containing an approximately 305 m climb followed by an equal descent. The 39 riders in the time trial were broken into three groups, who would race the clock one hour separate from one another. Most of the medal favorites were in the last group. Each rider started the course a minute and thirty seconds after the rider who went before them.

The leader at the end of the first group of 13 was Svein Tuft (Canada), completing the course in 1h 04' 39". This was 23 seconds clear of the next closest competitor Robert Gesink (Netherlands). They were still the top two riders after the second group, with American David Zabriskie and Russian Denis Menchov, thought to be podium contenders, both turning in disappointing rides.

The medalists all came in the third group. Gustav Larsson of Sweden, starting seventh from the end, beat Tuft by nearly two minutes. The man after Larsson, American Levi Leipheimer, was 36 seconds slower than Larsson, but held on to win bronze. The event's prohibitive favorite, world time trial champion Fabian Cancellara, started last, and though he was six seconds behind Larson's pace at the final time check, he wound up winning the gold medal by a margin of 33 seconds. The other major gold medal favorite, Stefan Schumacher of Germany, finished over three minutes behind Cancellara.

== Final classification ==
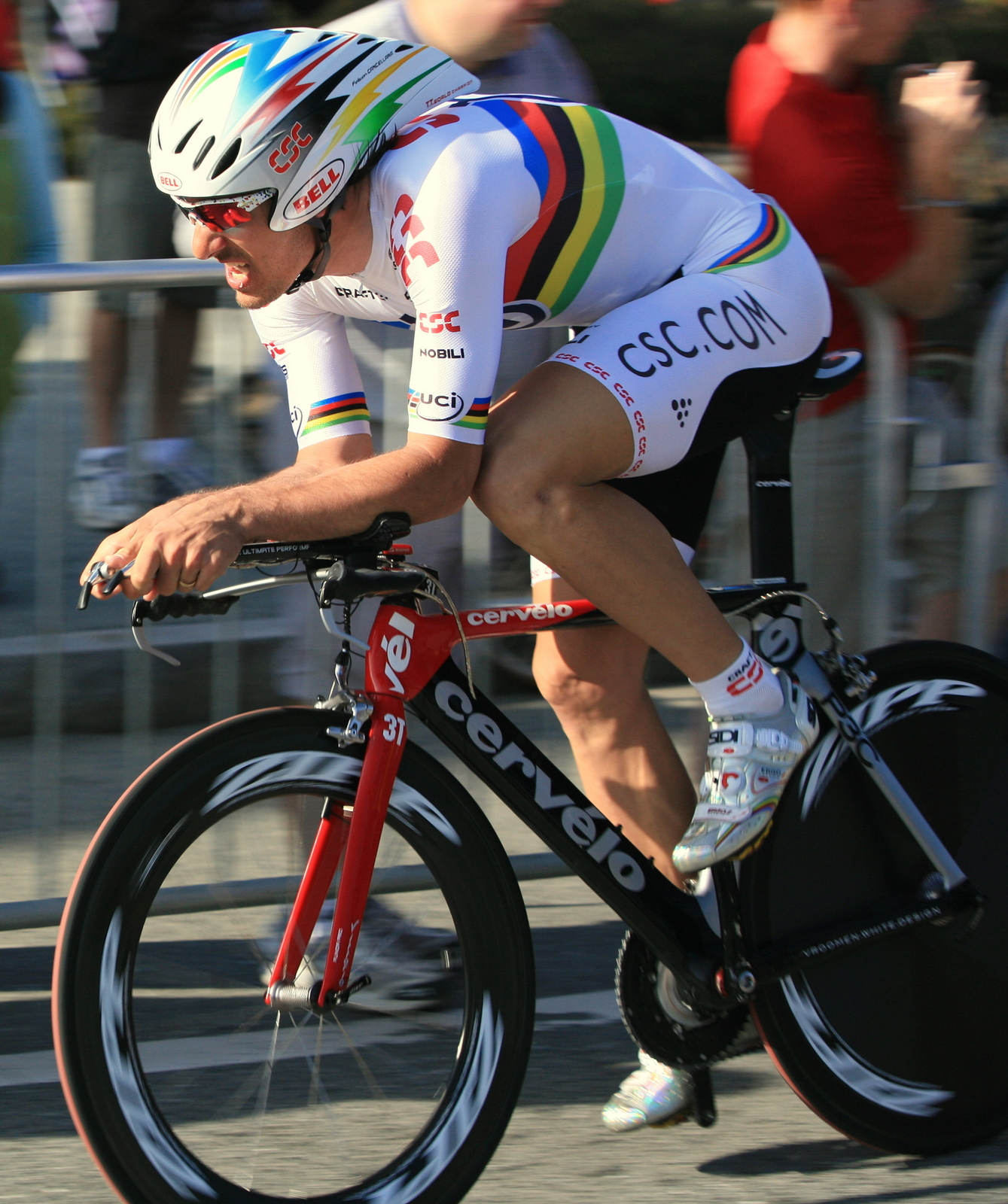
Gold medalist Fabian Cancellara

Rank	Rider	Country	Time
1st place, gold medalist(s)	Fabian Cancellara	Switzerland	1:02:11
2nd place, silver medalist(s)	Gustav Larsson	Sweden	1:02:44
3rd place, bronze medalist(s)	Levi Leipheimer	United States	1:03:21
4	Alberto Contador	Spain	1:03:29
5	Cadel Evans	Australia	1:03:34
6	Samuel Sánchez	Spain	1:04:37
7	Svein Tuft	Canada	1:04:39
8	Michael Rogers	Australia	1:04:46
9	Stef Clement	Netherlands	1:04:59
10	Robert Gesink	Netherlands	1:05:02
11	Steve Cummings	Great Britain	1:05:07
12	David Zabriskie	United States	1:05:17
DSQ	Stefan Schumacher	Germany	1:05:25
14	Bert Grabsch	Germany	1:05:26
15	Vincenzo Nibali	Italy	1:05:36
16	Ryder Hesjedal	Canada	1:05:42
17	Rein Taaramäe	Estonia	1:05:47
18	Vladimir Karpets	Russia	1:05:52
19	Chris Anker Sørensen	Denmark	1:05:55
20	Denis Menchov	Russia	1:06:10
21	Vasil Kiryienka	Belarus	1:06:12
22	Marzio Bruseghin	Italy	1:06:20
23	Kim Kirchen	Luxembourg	1:06:29
24	Andrey Mizurov	Kazakhstan	1:06:32
25	Santiago Botero	Colombia	1:06:35
26	Maxime Monfort	Belgium	1:07:12
27	László Bodrogi	Hungary	1:07:27
28	Simon Špilak	Slovenia	1:07:34
29	Matej Jurčo	Slovakia	1:07:52
30	Matías Médici	Argentina	1:07:53
31	David George	South Africa	1:07:55
32	Andriy Hryvko	Ukraine	1:08:01
33	Brian Bach Vandborg	Denmark	1:08:10
34	Przemysław Niemiec	Poland	1:08:43
35	Hossein Askari	Iran	1:08:46
36	Raivis Belohvoščiks	Latvia	1:08:54
37	Denys Kostyuk	Ukraine	1:09:04
38	Matija Kvasina	Croatia	1:09:06
39	Fumiyuki Beppu	Japan	1:11:05
