= 2005 Chrono des Herbiers =

Race details
- Dates: 16 October 2005
- Stages: 1
- Distance: 48.15 km (29.92 mi)
- Winning time: 1h 00' 18"

Results
	Winner	Ondřej Sosenka (CZE)
	Second	Michael Rogers (AUS)
	Third	Vladimir Gusev (RUS)

The 2005 Chrono des Herbiers was the 24th edition of the Chrono des Nations cycle race and was held on 16 October 2005. The race started and finished in Les Herbiers. The race was won by Ondřej Sosenka.

== General classification ==
Final general classification

Rank	Rider	Time
1	Ondřej Sosenka (CZE)	1h 00' 18"
2	Michael Rogers (AUS)	+ 2"
3	Vladimir Gusev (RUS)	+ 18"
4	Raivis Belohvoščiks (LAT)	+ 34"
5	Olivier Kaisen (BEL)	+ 1' 22"
6	Yuriy Krivtsov (UKR)	+ 1' 32"
7	Fabian Cancellara (SUI)	+ 1' 42"
8	Marco Pinotti (ITA)	+ 1' 55"
9	Nicolas Fritsch (FRA)	+ 2' 35"
10	Ben Day (AUS)	+ 2' 36"
