= Voltas–Tartu 2024 by CCN =

Estonian cycling team

Cycling Tartu
Team information
- UCI code: CCN
- Registered: Estonia
- Founded: 2018
- Discipline: Road
- Status: UCI Continental
- Bicycles: Scott
- Website: Team home page

Key personnel
- General manager: Jaan Kirsipuu
- Team manager: Gediminas Bagdonas

Team name history
- Tartu2024–BalticChainCycling.com (2018-2019); Cycling Tartu (2020); Ampler Development Team (2021); Team Ampler - Tartu 2024 (2022); Tartu2024 Cycling Team (2023); Voltas–Tartu 2024 by CCN (2024)

Cycling Tartu is an Estonian-registered UCI Continental road cycling team founded in 2018. It was called Cycling Tartu in its first 2 years 2018-2019 (amateur team). In 2019 Norman Vahtra got 8 UCI victories and turned pro in Israel Start Up Nation (WT). Cycling Tartu was founded and managed by the former pro rider Rene Mandri. He registered the team as UCI continental team from 2020 and left the team at the end of 2022 to become one of the assistant Sports Directors in Israel-Premier Tech. The iconic ex-pro and TDF yello jersey Jaan Kirsipuu became the manager of the team and Lithuanian (ex)road race champion Gediminas Bagdonas joined as Sports Director. Cycling Tartu has formed riders like Norman Vahtra, Markus Pajur, Rait Ärm, Madis Mihkels & Aivaras Mikutis.

== Team roster ==
As of 10 June 2023.

Rider	Date of birth
Rokas Adomaitis (LTU)	6 August 2004 (age 22)
Aaron Aus (EST)	10 March 2004 (age 22)
Siim Kiskonen (EST)	16 January 1997 (age 29)
Markus Knaapi (FIN)	4 November 2002 (age 23)
Alekss Krasts (LAT)	22 August 2001 (age 25)

Rider	Date of birth
Joonas Kurits (EST)	15 April 2002 (age 24)
Markus Pajur (EST)	23 September 2000 (age 25)
Andre Roos (EST)	22 November 2002 (age 23)
Lauri Tamm (EST)	2 April 2004 (age 22)
Jomantas Venckus (LTU)	14 July 2004 (age 22)

== Major results ==
2020
Stage 2 Baltic Chain Tour, Rait Ärm
Estonia National Time Trial Championship, Gleb Karpenko
Finland National Time Trial Championships, Ukko Peltonen
Finland National Road Race Championships, Antti-Jussi Juntunen
2021
Lithuania National Under-23 Road Race Championships, Aivaras Mikutis
Latvia National Under-23 Road Race Championships, Pauls Rubenis
Stage 4 Dookoła Mazowsza, Antti-Jussi Juntunen

== National champions ==
2020
Estonian Time Trial, Gleb Karpenko
Finnish Time Trial, Ukko Peltonen
Finnish Road Race Trial, Antti-Jussi Juntunen
2021
Lithuanian U23 Road Race, Aivaras Mikutis
Latvian U23 Road Race, Pauls Rubenis
2022
Finnish Time Trial, Markus Knaapi
Finnish U23 Time Trial, Markus Knaapi
Latvian Road Race, Alekss Krasts
Lithuanian U23 Road Race, Aivaras Mikutis
