= 2004 Chrono des Herbiers =

Race details
- Dates: 17 October 2004
- Stages: 1
- Distance: 48.15 km (29.92 mi)
- Winning time: 1h 01' 19"

Results
	Winner	Bert Roesems (BEL)
	Second	Vladimir Gusev (RUS)
	Third	Sebastian Lang (GER)

The 2004 Chrono des Herbiers was the 23rd edition of the Chrono des Nations cycle race and was held on 17 October 2004. The race started and finished in Les Herbiers. The race was won by Bert Roesems.

== General classification ==
Final general classification

Rank	Rider	Time
1	Bert Roesems (BEL)	1h 01' 19"
2	Vladimir Gusev (RUS)	+ 10"
3	Sebastian Lang (GER)	+ 1' 03"
4	Yuriy Krivtsov (UKR)	+ 1' 17"
5	Raivis Belohvoščiks (LAT)	+ 1' 55"
6	Ben Day (AUS)	+ 2' 13"
7	Michael Rogers (AUS)	+ 2' 23"
8	Jean Nuttli (SUI)	+ 2' 53"
9	Nicolas Fritsch (FRA)	+ 3' 07"
10	Marco Pinotti (ITA)	+ 3' 11"
