= Finnish National Time Trial Championships =

National road cycling championship in Finland

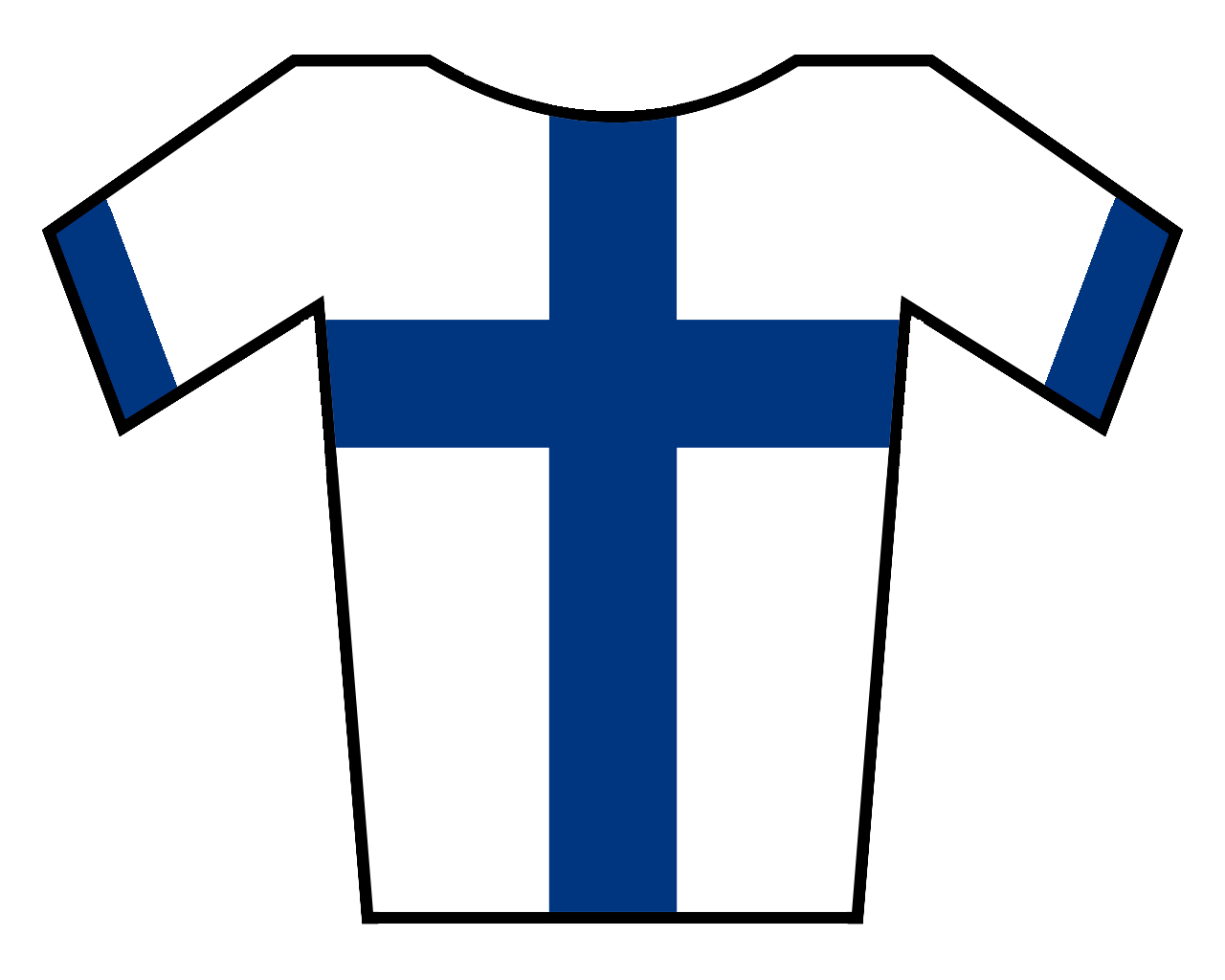

The Finnish National Time Trial Championships have been held since 1999.

== Men ==
Year	Gold	Silver	Bronze
1999	Mika Hietanen	Joona Laukka	Jukka Heinikainen
2000	Christian Selin	Jukka Heinikainen	Joona Laukka
2001	Jukka Heinikainen	Joona Laukka	Matti Helminen
2002	Jukka Heinikainen	Jussi Veikkanen	Matti Helminen
2003	Matti Helminen	Jukka Heinikainen	Kjell Carlström
2004	Jukka Vastaranta	Kimmo Kananen	Jussi Veikkanen
2005	Tommi Martikainen	Jarmo Rissanen	Matti Helminen
2006	Matti Helminen	Jarmo Rissanen	Jussi Veikkanen
2007	Matti Helminen	Jarmo Rissanen	Pasi Ahlroos
2008	Matti Helminen	Jussi Veikkanen	Jarmo Rissanen
2009	Jarmo Rissanen	Matti Helminen	Marko Leppämäki
2010	Matti Helminen	Jarmo Rissanen	Rainer Aaltonen
2011	Aki Turunen	Matti Helminen	Tommi Martikainen
2012	Matti Helminen	Jarmo Rissanen	Tommi Martikainen
2013	Samuel Pökälä	Aki Turunen	Jarmo Rissanen
2014	Samuel Pökälä	Juho Saarinen	Samuel Halme
2015	Samuel Pökälä	Matti Helminen	Jussi Veikkanen
2016	Samuel Pökälä	Tommi Martikainen	Sasu Halme
2017	Sasu Halme	Matti Manninen	Samuel Pökälä
2018	Johan Nordlund	Tommi Martikainen	Trond Larsen
2019	Ukko Iisakki Peltonen	Matti Helminen	Oskari Vainionpää
2020	Ukko Iisakki Peltonen	Matti Hietajärvi	Antti-Jussi Juntunen
2021	Matti Hietajärvi	Ukko Iisakki Peltonen	Markus Auvinen
2022	Riku Övermark	Markus Auvinen	Vladyslav Makogon
2023	Vladyslav Makogon	Riku Övermark	Trond Larsen
2024	Trond Larsen	Axel Källberg	Vladyslav Makogon
2025	Trond Larsen	Mikhail Utkin	Sampo Malinen

== Women ==
Year	Gold	Silver	Bronze
1999	Sanna Lehtimäki	Tarja-Leena Lehtimäki	Sirpa Ahlroos-Kouko
2000	Kristina Iisakkila		
2001	Sari Saarelainen	Kristina Iisakkila	Teija Alaviiri
2002	Kristina Iisakkila	Sari Saarelainen	Tarja-Leena Lehtimäki
2003	Tiina Nieminen		
2004	Tiina Nieminen		
2005	Tiina Nieminen	Paula Suominen	
2006	Paula Suominen	Leena Haavisto	
2007	Tiina Nieminen	Paula Suominen	Leena Haavisto
2008	Anne Rautio	Lotta Lepistö	Heljä Korhonen
2009	Heljä Korhonen	Lotta Lepistö	Merje Kiviranta
2010	Anna Lindström	Heljä Korhonen	Merje Kiviranta
2011	Pia Sundstedt	Heljä Korhonen	Merje Kiviranta
2012	Anne Palm	Venla Koivula	Merje Kiviranta
2013	Sari Saarelainen	Lotta Lepistö	Emma Sten
2014	Lotta Lepistö	Merja Särkioja	Laura Vainionpää
2015	Lotta Lepistö	Merja Särkioja	Sari Saarelainen
2016	Lotta Lepistö	Sari Saarelainen	Antonia Gröndahl
2017	Lotta Lepistö	Sari Saarelainen	Laura Vainionpää
2018	Lotta Lepistö	Antonia Gröndahl	Sari Saarelainen
2019	Minna-Maria Kangas	Sari Saarelainen	Tiina Pohjalainen
2020	Minna-Maria Kangas	Minna Koistinen	Ano Luoma
2021	Tiina Pohjalainen	Minna-Maria Kangas	Maisa Tuliniemi
2022	Anniina Ahtosalo	Tiina Pohjalainen	Minna Koistinen
2023	Anniina Ahtosalo	Lotta Henttala	Minna Koistinen
2024	Anniina Ahtosalo	Wilma Aintila	Essi Pelto-Arvo
2025	Anniina Ahtosalo	Minttu Hukka	Ruska Saarela

== See also ==
- Finnish National Road Race Championships
- National Road Cycling Championships
