= 2006 Chrono des Nations =

Race details
- Dates: 15 October 2006
- Stages: 1
- Distance: 48.15 km (29.92 mi)
- Winning time: 1h 00' 02"

Results
	Winner	Raivis Belohvoščiks (LAT)
	Second	Brian Vandborg (DEN)
	Third	Matti Helminen (FIN)

The 2006 Chrono des Nations was the 25th edition of the Chrono des Nations cycle race and was held on 15 October 2006. The race started and finished in Les Herbiers. The race was won by Raivis Belohvoščiks.

== General classification ==
Final general classification

Rank	Rider	Time
1	Raivis Belohvoščiks (LAT)	1h 00' 02"
2	Brian Vandborg (DEN)	+ 27"
3	Matti Helminen (FIN)	+ 1' 51"
4	Vladimir Gusev (RUS)	+ 2' 01"
5	Stef Clement (NED)	+ 2' 06"
6	Yuriy Krivtsov (UKR)	+ 2' 36"
7	Aivaras Baranauskas (LTU)	+ 2' 38"
8	Nicolas Fritsch (FRA)	s.t.
9	Manuel Quinziato (ITA)	+ 2' 41"
10	Thomas Voeckler (FRA)	+ 2' 47"
