= Menno Willems =

Dutch footballer (born 1977)

Personal information
- Date of birth: 10 March 1977 (age 49)
- Place of birth: Amsterdam, Netherlands
- Positions: Defender; midfielder

Youth career
- 1995–1996: Ajax

Senior career*
Years	Team	Apps	(Gls)
1996–1997	Ajax	2	(0)
1997–1999	Vitesse	12	(1)
1999–2000	→ FC Den Bosch (loan)	24	(0)
2000–2001	→ Grimsby Town (loan)	14	(1)
2001–2002	Grimsby Town	40	(1)
2002–2004	HFC Haarlem	47	(3)
2004–2005	Sparta Rotterdam	32	(0)
2005–2006	Go Ahead Eagles	6	(0)
Total		177	(6)
- * Club domestic league appearances and goals

Menno Willems (born 10 March 1977) is a Dutch former professional footballer who played as a defender and midfielder.

He notably played for Vitesse, Ajax and Grimsby Town. He also played for FC Den Bosch, HFC Haarlem, Sparta Rotterdam and Go Ahead Eagles before being forced to retirement at the age of 30.

== Career ==
Born in Amsterdam, Willems was scouted by Dutch club Ajax and he signed to the Amsterdam-based club when he was a youngster and took the step up to the first team in 1996. After one season of limited chances or football action, Willems left Ajax bound for fellow Eredivisie side Vitesse Arnhem where he would remain until 1999.

He then spent a season playing with FC Den Bosch before returning to Vitesse a year later. In November 2001, Menno signed a three-month loan deal with English club Grimsby Town as Mariners boss Lennie Lawrence brought in a wave of foreign talent following the dismissal of Alan Buckley. Willems along with David Nielsen, Knut Anders Fostervold and Zhang Enhua linked up with the club on loan.

After the end of his three-month loan deal Grimsby paid Vitesse £160,000 for Menno, and made him one of the most highly paid players at the club. He played out the final few months of the 2000–01 season and was the only foreign loan star too sign a permanent deal. In the new season, slight injury problems coupled with performances of other players saw Willems fall out of favour at the club under new manager Paul Groves. In May 2002, Willems left the club on a free transfer.

He soon returned to the Netherlands, playing for HFC Haarlem for two seasons, before playing out the next two seasons with Sparta Rotterdam and Go Ahead Eagles.

Willems called time on his professional football career at the end of the 2005–06 season. Because of wear and tear to the cartilage in his knee, he was advised to end his football career.

== Personal life ==
Willems is related to fellow footballer and former Derby County midfielder Ron Willems.

In 2012 Willems was sent to prison in Belgium for fraud following the collapse of his flowers business.
