= 2008 Chrono des Nations =

Race details
- Dates: 19 October 2008
- Stages: 1
- Distance: 48.5 km (30.1 mi)
- Winning time: 1h 00' 58"

Results
	Winner	Stef Clement (NED)
	Second	Manuel Quinziato (ITA)
	Third	Raivis Belohvoščiks (LAT)

The 2008 Chrono des Nations was the 27th edition of the Chrono des Nations cycle race and was held on 19 October 2008. The race started and finished in Les Herbiers. The race was won by Stef Clement.

== General classification ==
Final general classification

Rank	Rider	Time
1	Stef Clement (NED)	1h 00' 58"
2	Manuel Quinziato (ITA)	+ 2"
3	Raivis Belohvoščiks (LAT)	+ 3"
4	Marco Pinotti (ITA)	+ 4"
5	Rubens Bertogliati (SUI)	+ 50"
6	Gregor Gazvoda (SLO)	+ 58"
7	Evgeny Vakker (KGZ)	+ 59"
8	Vladimir Gusev (RUS)	+ 1' 30"
9	Andriy Hrivko (UKR)	+ 1' 41"
10	Florian Morizot (FRA)	+ 2' 04"
