= Siim Kiskonen =

Estonian cyclist (born 1997)

Personal information
- Born: 16 January 1997 (age 29)
- Height: 1.72 m (5 ft 8 in)
- Weight: 64 kg (141 lb)

Cycling career
- Sport: Cycling
- Current team: Voltas–Tartu 2024 by CCN
- Disciplines: Road; Cyclo-cross
- Role: Rider

Amateur teams
- 2016–2018: VC Toucy
- 2019: Cycling Tartu
- 2020–2022: EC Saint-Étienne Loire

Professional team
- 2023–: Tartu2024 Cycling Team

Siim Kiskonen (born 16 January 1997) is an Estonian cyclist, who currently rides for UCI Continental team Voltas–Tartu 2024 by CCN.

Kiskonen turned professional in 2023, winning the first stage and the overall classification of the Course de Solidarność et des Champions Olympiques that year. The following May, he won his first professional race, taking stage two and the overall title of the Tour of Estonia.

== Major results ==
=== Road ===
2015
1st Mountains classification, Internationale Niedersachsen-Rundfahrt der Junioren
National Junior Championships

3rd Road race
3rd Time trial

10th Overall La Coupe du Président de la Ville de Grudziądz
2019
2nd Puchar MON
3rd Puchar Uzdrowisk Karpackich
4th Memoriał Henryka Łasaka
9th Grand Prix Alanya
2020
8th Overall Baltic Chain Tour
2021
4th Paris–Mantes
10th Overall Baltic Chain Tour
2022
2nd Road race, National Championships
2023
1st Overall Course de Solidarność et des Champions Olympiques

1st Stage 1a

1st Overall Red Bull Tour of Vikings

1st Stages 2 & 3

7th Overall Tour of Estonia
2024 (2 pro wins)
1st Overall Tour of Estonia

1st Stage 2

=== Track ===
2015
1st Team pursuit, National Championships
National Junior Championships

1st Points race
2nd Individual pursuit
2nd Team sprint

=== Cyclo-cross ===
2015–2016
3rd National Junior Championships
2016–2017
2nd National Under-23 Championships
2017–2018
1st National Under-23 Championships
2018–2019
3rd National Championships
2019–2020
2nd National Under-23 Championships
3rd National Championships
