= Ukko Peltonen =

Finnish cyclist

Personal information
- Full name: Ukko Iisakki Peltonen
- Born: 15 June 1998 (age 28) Helsinki, Finland
- Height: 1.87 m (6 ft 2 in)
- Weight: 69 kg (152 lb)

Cycling career
- Sport: Cycling
- Discipline: Road
- Role: Rider

Amateur team
- 2018–2019: TWD-Länken

Professional teams
- 2020–2021: Tartu2024–BalticChainCycling.com
- 2022: Global 6 Cycling

Ukko Iisakki Peltonen (born 15 June 1998) is a Finnish racing cyclist, who last rode for UCI Continental team Global 6 Cycling.

== Major results ==
2018
2nd Time trial, National Under-23 Road Championships
2019
1st Time trial, National Road Championships
1st Time trial, National Under-23 Road Championships
2020
National Road Championships

1st Time trial
2nd Road race

2021
National Road Championships

2nd Road race
2nd Time trial

8th Overall Dookoła Mazowsza
