= Jussi Veikkanen =

Finnish cyclist

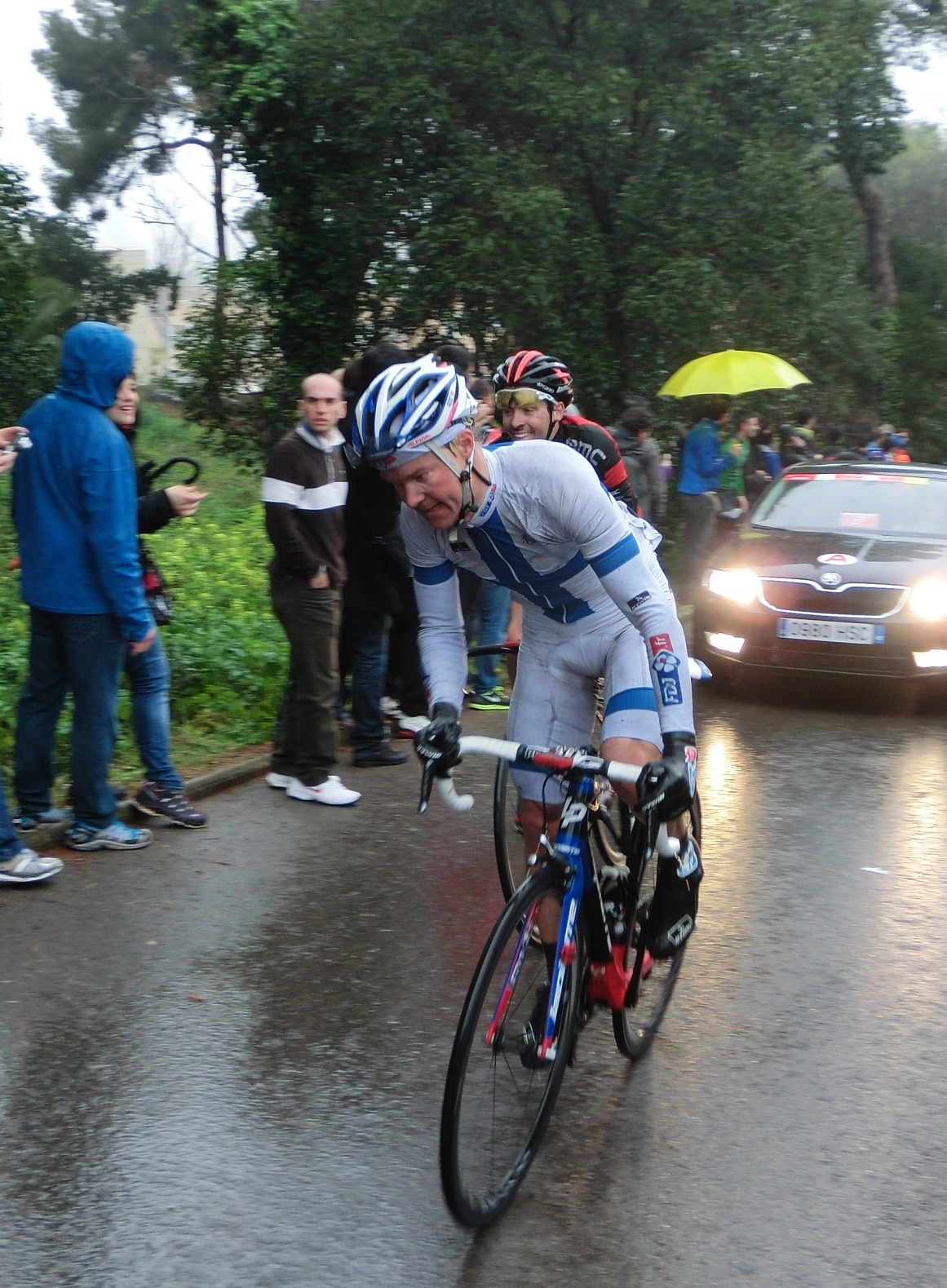
- Veikkanen at the 2014 Volta a Catalunya

Personal information
- Full name: Jussi Veikkanen
- Born: 29 March 1981 (age 45) Riihimäki, Finland
- Height: 1.78 m (5 ft 10 in)
- Weight: 66 kg (146 lb)

Cycling career
- Sport: Cycling
- Current team: Groupama–FDJ United
- Discipline: Road
- Role: Rider (retired); Directeur sportif
- Rider type: All-rounder

Amateur teams
- 2001: Top Kärnten–Giant
- 2002–2003: Mälarenergi–Sime
- 2004: VC Roubaix

Professional teams
- 2005–2010: Française des Jeux
- 2011: Omega Pharma–Lotto
- 2012–2015: FDJ–BigMat

Managerial team
- 2016–: FDJ (directeur sportif)

Major wins
- National Road Race Championships (2003, 2005–2006, 2008, 2010, 2013–2014)

Jussi Veikkanen (born 29 March 1981) is a Finnish former road racing cyclist, who rode as a professional between 2005 and 2015 for the Omega Pharma–Lotto and FDJ teams. He won the Finnish National Road Race Championships seven times between 2003 and 2014.

== Career ==
Born in Riihimäki, Veikkanen started his career with team Mälarenergi and he became a professional cyclist in 2005 with Française des Jeux.

After a long breakaway on stage 2 of the 2009 Tour de France he donned the polka-dot jersey as the leader of the mountains classification. He kept the jersey until stage 6, when Stéphane Augé took it.

He signed with Omega Pharma–Lotto for the 2011 season, but rejoined FDJ–BigMat for the 2012 season.

Veikkanen announced ahead of the 2015 edition of the Tour de Vendée that the race would be his last as a professional, and that he would remain with FDJ as a member of staff after retiring from the road.

== Major results ==
2002
National Road Championships

2nd Road race
2nd Time trial

2003
1st Road race, National Road Championships
2nd Overall Circuit des Ardennes
2004
1st Grand Prix des Marbriers
2nd Overall Ruban Granitier Breton
National Road Championships

3rd Road race
3rd Time trial

4th Paris–Troyes
2005
1st Road race, National Road Championships
5th Grand Prix of Aargau Canton
2006
National Road Championships

1st Road race
3rd Time trial

1st Overall La Tropicale Amissa Bongo

1st Stage 1

3rd Overall Tour du Poitou-Charentes

1st Stage 2

8th Overall Volta ao Distrito de Santarém
2007
3rd Overall La Tropicale Amissa Bongo Ondimbo
8th Overall Tour Méditerranéen
2008
National Road Championships

1st Road race
2nd Time trial

1st Stage 4 Route du Sud
4th Overall Tour de l'Ain
5th Overall Tour de Wallonie
10th Overall Deutschland Tour

1st Stage 6

2009
2nd Overall Tour Méditerranéen
3rd Overall Tour du Haut Var
9th Overall Tour Down Under
9th Grand Prix d'Isbergues
Tour de France

Held after Stages 2–5

2010
1st Road race, National Road Championships
6th Overall Tour Méditerranéen

1st Stage 2

2013
1st Road race, National Road Championships
10th Overall Tour Down Under
2014
1st Road race, National Road Championships
2015
National Road Championships

2nd Road race
3rd Time trial

=== Grand Tour general classification results timeline ===
| Grand Tour | 2005 | 2006 | 2007 | 2008 | 2009 | 2010 | 2011 | 2012 | 2013 | 2014 | 2015 |
|---|---|---|---|---|---|---|---|---|---|---|---|
| Giro d'Italia | — | 70 | 44 | 50 | — | — | 119 | 146 | — | 109 | 147 |
| Tour de France | — | — | — | — | 106 | — | — | — | — | — | — |
| Vuelta a España | DNF | — | 135 | — | — | — | — | — | DNF | — | DNF |

Legend
| — | Did not compete |
| DNF | Did not finish |
