= Jukka Vastaranta =

Finnish cyclist

Personal information
- Born: 29 March 1984 (age 42) Tampere, Finland

Cycling career
- Sport: Cycling
- Disciplines: Road; Mountain
- Role: Rider
- Rider type: Sprinter (road)

Professional teams
- 2003–2004: Rabobank GS3
- 2005–2006: Rabobank
- 2007: Jartazi–Promo Fashion
- 2008: Brink–Ten Tusscher
- 2010: SP Tableware
- 2010–2011: Trek–Brentjens MTB Racing Team
- 2012: Team Trek–Cingolani
- 2013: Medilaser–Specialized MTB Team

Jukka Vastaranta (born 29 March 1984) is a Finnish professional cyclist from Tampere. From 2003 to 2006 he rode for the Dutch team Rabobank but in 2007 he switched to the Belgian continental team Jartazi–Promo Fashion. In 2008 he rode for the mountain bike team Brink-Ten Tusscher, but after a good start had to retire again due to prolonged health problems.

After settling back to Finland, in late 2008 he finally found some help for the health problems he had suffered from past several seasons. In 2009, he significantly got better and won all Finnish mountain bike races that he took part in and finished 36th in MTB Marathon World Championships.

Jukka started the season 2010 without a team, but had a short contract with SP Tableware, a Greek Continental-level road team, but was in strong form. He finished 4th in MTB Marathon European Championships and took some important victories in Europe. In July, the first MTB XC Olympic Champion Bart Brentjens contacted Jukka to join his professional team, Trek-Brentjens MTB Racing Team.

== Major results ==
=== Road ===
1999
2nd Criterium, European Youth Olympic Festival
2001
1st Overall Tour de l'Abitibi

1st Stages 3 & 5

1st Overall GP Général Patton

1st Stage 1

1st Overall La Coupe du Président de la Ville de Grudziądz

1st Stages 3 & 5

8th Road race, UCI Junior Road World Championships
2002
1st Overall GP Général Patton

1st Stage 1

1st Overall Trophée Centre Morbihan

1st Stages 1 & 2

1st Remouchamps–Ferrières–Remouchamps
UCI Junior Road World Championships

2nd Time trial
7th Road race

2nd Overall Keizer der Juniores
3rd Overall UCI Juniors World Cup
2003
1st Overall Triptyque Ardennais

1st Stages 1 & 3

1st Flèche Ardennaise
1st Brussels–Opwijk
1st Stage 2 Tour des Pyrénées
2nd Overall Volta a Lleida

1st Stages 3 & 5

5th Vlaamse Pijl
5th Time trial, National Road Championships
7th Rund um Düren
8th Road race, European Under-23 Road Championships
8th Overall Ruban Granitier Breton
2004
1st Time trial, National Road Championships
1st Stage 3 Olympia's Tour
2nd Overall Circuit des Mines

1st Stage 3

4th La Côte Picarde
4th Grand Prix de la Ville de Lillers
6th Overall Paris–Corrèze
2005
1st Stage 3 Ster Elektrotoer
3rd Overall Tour de Luxembourg
9th Overall UNIQA Classic
9th Scheldeprijs
2007
8th Overall Étoile de Bessèges

=== Mountain ===
UCI Mountain Bike World Championships

- 8th, Marathon (2011)
- 27th, Cross Country (2010)

UCI Mountain Bike European Championships

- 2nd, Marathon (2011)
- 4th, Marathon (2010)
- 1st, Cross Country Juniors (2001)

UCI Mountain Bike Finnish Championships

- 1st, Cross Country (2011, 2010, 2009, 2001)
- 1st, Marathon (2010, 2009)

UCI Road Bike World Cup

- 1st overall, Juniors (2001)

UCI Road Bike World Championships

- 2nd, Juniors (2002)

UCI Road Bike Finnish Championships

- 1st, TT (2004)

Miscellaneous

- 1st in KitzAlpBike XCO (2011)
- 3rd in Dolomiti Superbike (2011)
- 1st overall in Zillertal Bike Challenge (2010)
- Winner of the 2nd event of Spanish MTB Marathon Cup (2010)
- Stage winner in Ster Electro tour (2005)
- Second in Tour of Luxemburg (2005)
