= 2007 Chrono des Nations =

Race details
- Dates: 21 October 2007
- Stages: 1
- Distance: 48.32 km (30.02 mi)
- Winning time: 59' 18"

Results
	Winner	László Bodrogi (HUN)
	Second	Raivis Belohvoščiks (LAT)
	Third	Stef Clement (NED)

The 2007 Chrono des Nations was the 26th edition of the Chrono des Nations cycle race and was held on 21 October 2007. The race started and finished in Les Herbiers. The race was won by László Bodrogi.

== General classification ==
Final general classification

Rank	Rider	Time
1	László Bodrogi (HUN)	59' 18"
2	Raivis Belohvoščiks (LAT)	+ 36"
3	Stef Clement (NED)	+ 2' 13"
4	Yuriy Krivtsov (UKR)	+ 2' 26"
5	Vladimir Gusev (RUS)	+ 2' 34"
6	Gustav Larsson (SWE)	+ 2' 53"
7	Matti Helminen (FIN)	+ 2' 57"
8	Thomas Voeckler (FRA)	+ 3' 54"
9	Gregor Gazvoda (SLO)	+ 4' 01"
10	Olivier Kaisen (BEL)	+ 4' 06"
