= Joona Laukka =

Finnish cyclist (born 1972)

Personal information
- Full name: Joona Laukka
- Born: 30 June 1972 (age 54) Helsinki, Finland
- Height: 1.80 m (5 ft 11 in)
- Weight: 68 kg (150 lb; 10 st 10 lb)

Cycling career
- Sport: Cycling
- Discipline: Road
- Role: Rider

Amateur teams
- 1992–1994: Vélo-Club de Roubaix
- 2001: Bressuire AC

Professional teams
- 1994: Festina–Lotus (stagiaire)
- 1995–1997: Festina–Lotus
- 1998: Lotto–Mobistar
- 1999: Acceptcard Pro Cycling
- 1999–2000: Benfica–Winterthur
- 2002: Jean Delatour

Major wins
- Tour de Wallonie (1994)

Joona Laukka (born 30 June 1972) is a Finnish former racing cyclist. He won the Finnish national road race title in 1996. He also competed in the road race event at the 1996 Summer Olympics. During the 1998 Tour de France Laukka escaped with six other riders in a breakaway that stayed away to the finish and as a result he was in 4th place overall for two stages. He would eventually abandon the 98 Tour, but finished the 1997 Tour de France in the top quarter of the field coming in 35th place.

Laukka won the 1994 edition of Tour de Wallonie.

== Major results ==
1989
1st Time trial, National Junior Road Championships
1990
National Junior Road Championships

1st Road race
1st Time trial

1992
10th Overall Tour of Sweden
1994
1st Overall Tour de Wallonie

1st Stage 8 (ITT)

3rd Time trial, National Road Championships
1995
7th Trophée des Grimpeurs
8th Overall Four Days of Dunkirk
8th Overall Etoile de Bessèges
1996
National Road Championships

1st Road race
1st Time trial

43rd Overall Route du Sud
1997
1st Stage 7 Tour de l'Avenir
1998
10th Trofeo Laigueglia
1999
2nd Time trial, National Road Championships
5th Overall Ringerike GP
2000
3rd Time trial, National Road Championships
2001
1st Overall Tour de Corrèze

1st Stage 1

National Road Championships

2nd Time trial
3rd Road race

4th Overall Circuit des Mines
7th Overall Tour of Sweden

=== Grand Tour general classification results timeline ===
Grand Tour	1995	1996	1997	1998	1999
Giro d'Italia	—	14	—	—	—
Tour de France	—	—	DNF	35	—
/ Vuelta a España	DNF	—	—	85	42

Legend
—	Did not compete
DNF	Did not finish
