= Luke Cornwall =

English footballer

Personal information
- Full name: Lucas Clarence Cornwall
- Date of birth: 23 July 1980 (age 46)
- Place of birth: Lambeth, London, England
- Height: 6 ft 3 in (1.91 m)
- Position: Forward

Youth career
- Fulham

Senior career*
| Years | Team | Apps | (Gls) |
| 1997–2003 | Fulham | 4 | (1) |
| 1999 | → Queens Park Rangers (loan) | 0 | (0) |
| 2001 | → Grimsby Town (loan) | 10 | (4) |
| 2003 | → Lincoln City (loan) | 3 | (0) |
| 2003–2004 | Bradford City | 3 | (0) |
| 2004 | Woking | 7 | (3) |
| 2004–2005 | Lewes | | |
| 2004–2005 | → AFC Wimbledon (loan) | | |
| 2005–2006 | Dulwich Hamlet | | |
| 2006–2007 | Metropolitan Police | | |
- * Club domestic league appearances and goals

Lucas Clarence Cornwall (born 23 July 1980) is an English former professional footballer who played as a striker from 1997 to 2007.

He began his career at Fulham and went on to play for Queens Park Rangers, Grimsby Town, Lincoln City and Bradford City. He also turned out at non-league level for Woking, Lewes, AFC Wimbledon, Dulwich Hamlet and Metropolitan Police.

== Career ==
Born in Lambeth, London, Cornwall was a trainee with Fulham, with whom he made his league debut on 12 September 1998. He made just one league start in six years at Craven Cottage though he did score in a 3–3 draw with York City.

Instead he made a series of loan spells at Queens Park Rangers, Grimsby Town where he scored four times and Lincoln City before he was signed for Bradford City in June 2003. He spent less than a season at Valley Parade and was released for a return to the south. He spent a year each at Woking, Sutton United and Dulwich Hamlet. He moved to Metropolitan Police but at the end of the 2006–07 season he decided to retire.
