= Vladimir Gusev (cyclist) =

Russian cyclist

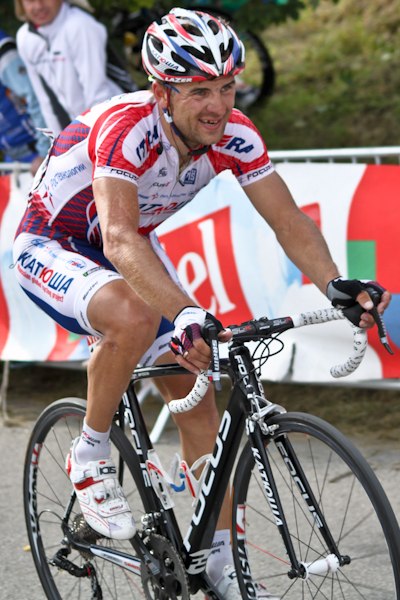
- Gusev at the 2011 Tour de France

Personal information
- Full name: Vladimir Nikolayevich Gusev; Владимир Николаевич Гусев
- Nickname: Goose
- Born: 4 July 1982 (age 44) Nizhny Novgorod, Russia
- Height: 1.77 m (5 ft 9 1/2 in)
- Weight: 69 kg (152 lb)

Cycling career
- Sport: Cycling
- Current team: Retired
- Discipline: Road
- Role: Rider
- Rider type: All-rounder

Professional teams
- 2004–2005: Team CSC
- 2006–2007: Discovery Channel
- 2008: Astana
- 2010–2014: Team Katusha
- 2015: Skydive Dubai–Al Ahli

Major wins
- National Time Trial Championships (2003, 2007, 2010)

Vladimir Nikolayevich Gusev (Russian: Владимир Николаевич Гусев, born 4 July 1982) is a Russian former professional road racing cyclist, who rode professionally between 2004 and 2015 for the Team CSC, Discovery Channel, Astana, Team Katusha and Skydive Dubai–Al Ahli teams.

== Career ==
At the 2006 Paris–Roubaix, Gusev finished fourth but was later one of three riders disqualified by the race jury for illegally riding through a closed level-crossing.

On 25 July 2008, Gusev was fired by his Astana team for showing "abnormal" values during an internal doping check, a decision the Court of Arbitration for Sport found to be unjust in a ruling the following June.

Gusev joined Team Katusha in 2010 after not riding for a trade team following his dismissal from Astana.

== Major results ==
2000
2nd Time trial, UCI Junior Road World Championships
2nd Overall Giro della Lunigiana
2001
10th Time trial, UCI Under-23 Road World Championships
2002
2nd Trofeo Alcide Degasperi
2nd Coppa Città di Asti
5th Overall Giro Ciclistico d'Italia
2003
1st Time trial, National Road Championships
1st Overall Grand Prix Guillaume Tell

1st Stages 3 & 4b (ITT)

3rd Time trial, UEC European Under-23 Road Championships
3rd Gran Premio di Poggiana
4th Overall Giro delle Regioni

1st Stage 1

4th Trofeo Gianfranco Bianchin
8th Gran Premio Palio del Recioto
2004
2nd Chrono des Herbiers
7th Cholet-Pays de Loire
8th Gent–Wevelgem
8th Paris–Bourges
2005
National Road Championships

2nd Road race
2nd Time trial

2nd Grand Prix d'Ouverture La Marseillaise
3rd Chrono des Herbiers
4th Paris–Camembert
8th HEW Cyclassics
9th Brabantse Pijl
10th Tour of Flanders
2006
1st Overall Sachsen Tour International
3rd Japan Cup
4th Overall Deutschland Tour

1st Young rider classification
1st Prologue

4th Chrono des Nations
8th Züri–Metzgete
UCI Road World Championships

10th Time trial
10th Road race

2007
1st Time trial, National Road Championships
1st Overall Tour of Belgium

1st Stage 3 (ITT)

Tour de Suisse

1st Mountains classification
1st Stage 7

Vuelta a Mallorca

2nd Trofeo Pollença
7th Trofeo Sóller

5th Overall Three Days of De Panne
5th Tour of Flanders
5th Chrono des Nations
5th Firenze–Pistoia
6th Time trial, UCI Road World Championships
6th Overall Eneco Tour
Tour de France

Held after Prologue–Stage 6

2008
1st Time trial, National Road Championships
2nd Overall Tour of Austria
8th Chrono des Nations
2010
National Road Championships

1st Time trial
2nd Road race

6th Overall Tour of Austria
10th Giro di Lombardia
2011
3rd E3 Prijs Vlaanderen
10th Overall Étoile de Bessèges
10th Münsterland Giro
2012
2nd Grand Prix of Aargau Canton
3rd Overall Bayern–Rundfahrt
7th Team time trial, UCI Road World Championships
2013
National Road Championships

2nd Road race
2nd Time trial

2014
2nd Road race, National Road Championships
2015
2nd Overall Tour du Maroc

1st Stage 8

5th Overall Tour de Ijen

=== Grand Tour general classification results timeline ===
| Grand Tour | 2004 | 2005 | 2006 | 2007 | 2008 | 2009 | 2010 | 2011 | 2012 | 2013 | 2014 |
|---|---|---|---|---|---|---|---|---|---|---|---|
| Giro d'Italia | — | — | — | — | 45 | — | — | — | — | 65 | 60 |
| Tour de France | — | — | — | 38 | — | — | — | 23 | DNF | — | — |
| Vuelta a España | 93 | — | 23 | — | — | — | 17 | — | — | 62 | — |

Legend
| — | Did not compete |
| DNF | Did not finish |
