= Tommi Martikainen =

Finnish cyclist

Personal information
- Full name: Tommi Martikainen
- Born: 13 January 1982 (age 44) Vaasa, Finland

Cycling career
- Sport: Cycling
- Discipline: Road
- Role: Rider

Professional team
- 2006–2009: Kalev Chocolate

Tommi Martikainen (born 13 January 1982) is a Finnish former racing cyclist. He finished in third place in the Finnish National Road Race Championships in 2006.

== Major results ==
2005
1st National Time Trial Championships
2008
1st Stage 2 Tour du Maroc
2011
3rd National Road Race Championships
3rd National Time Trial Championships
2012
3rd National Time Trial Championships
2016
2nd National Time Trial Championships
