= Gemla =

- Location within Kronoberg Location within Sweden
- Coordinates: 56°52′N 14°38′E
- Country: Sweden
- Province: Småland
- County: Kronoberg County
- Municipality: Växjö Municipality

Area
  - Total: 2.41 km^{2} (0.93 sq mi)

Population (31 December 2010)
  - Total: 1,342
  - Density: 556/km^{2} (1,440/sq mi)
- Time zone: UTC+1 (CET)
  - Summer (DST): UTC+2 (CEST)

Gemla (Swedish pronunciation: [ˈjɛ̂mːla]) is a locality situated in Växjö Municipality, Kronoberg County, Sweden with 1,342 inhabitants in 2010. Gemla is known for the late poet and writer, Pär Lagerkvist, whose childhood memories of Gemla are vividly described in the novel autobiography Gäst hos verkligheten (Translates to "Guest of the reality").

The cyclist Gustav Larsson, who won a silver medal in the Olympics, comes from Gemla.
