= Antti-Jussi Juntunen =

Finnish cyclist (born 1999)

Personal information
- Born: 6 April 1999 (age 27) Korso, Finland

Cycling career
- Sport: Cycling
- Current team: Quick Pro Team
- Disciplines: Road; Gravel
- Role: Rider

Professional teams
- 2020–2021: Tartu2024–BalticChainCycling.com
- 2022–2023: Abloc CT
- 2024: Voltas–Tartu 2024 by CCN
- 2024–: Ferei Quick-Panda Podium Mongolia Team

Major wins
- Single-day races and Classics National Road Race Championships (2020, 2023)

Antti-Jussi Juntunen (born 6 April 1999) is a Finnish racing cyclist, who currently rides for UCI Continental team Quick Pro Team. He won the Finnish National Road Race Championships in 2020 and 2023.

== Career ==
Juntunen was introduced to cycling by his father, who ran a local cycling club, and his brother, who was also a cyclist. He rode for French development team Remy Meder Haguenau as a junior, before moving to Estonian team Tartu2024–BalticChainCycling.com for the 2020 season. In 2020, he won the Finnish National Road Race Championships.

== Major results ==
2016
1st Time trial, National Junior Road Championships
2017
9th Overall La Coupe du Président de la Ville de Grudziądz
2019
National Under-23 Road Championships

1st Road race
2nd Time trial

National Road Championships

5th Road race
5th Time trial

2020
National Road Championships

1st Road race
3rd Time trial

3rd Carpathian Couriers Race
10th Overall Dookoła Mazowsza
2021
1st Stage 4 Dookoła Mazowsza
3rd Road race, National Road Championships
3rd Overall Baltic Chain Tour
4th GP Slovenian Istria
6th Memoriał Henryka Łasaka
7th Overall Tour of Estonia

1st Young rider classification

9th Poreč Trophy
10th Overall Kreiz Breizh Elites
2022
3rd Road race, National Road Championships
6th Ton Dolmans Trofee
2023
1st Road race, National Road Championships
1st Nordic & Finnish Gravel Championship
1st Rosendahl GP - Maantie Cup 3
1st Helsinki Velotour Race - Maanti Cup 7
1st Mountain classification, Sibiu Cycling Tour
2nd FNLD GRVL
2024
2nd Road race, National Road Championships
