= Sari Saarelainen =

Finnish cyclist

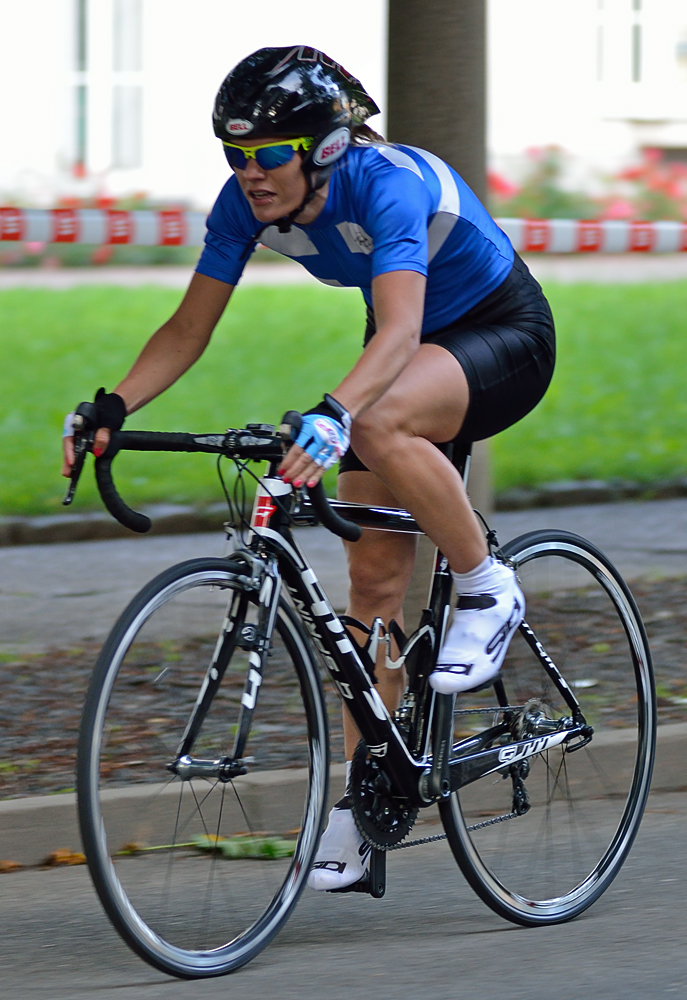
- Saarelainen riding in the 2012 Thüringen Rundfahrt der Frauen

Personal information
- Full name: Sari Saarelainen
- Born: 1 March 1981 (age 45) Finland

Cycling career
- Sport: Cycling
- Current team: Roland Le Dévoluy
- Discipline: Road
- Role: Rider (retired); Directeur sportif

Amateur teams
- 2000: Team Stuttgart
- 2017–2018: Maaslandster Veris CCN

Professional teams
- 1998: Acca Due O–Lorena Camicie
- 1999: Swam Hooch
- 2004: Team Let's Go Finland
- 2010: ACS Chirio–Forno d'Asolo
- 2012: Forno d'Asolo Colavita
- 2013: Faren–Let's Go Finland
- 2013: MCipollini–Giordana
- 2014–2015: Servetto Footon
- 2016: S.C. Michela Fanini Rox
- 2019–2021: Cogeas–Mettler–Look

Managerial team
- 2022–: Roland Cogeas Edelweiss Squad

Sari Saarelainen (born 1 March 1981) is a Finnish former racing cyclist, who now works as a directeur sportif for UCI Women's WorldTeam Roland Le Dévoluy. She competed in the 2013 UCI women's road race in Florence.

Saarelainen originally stopped competing in cycling at the end of 2004. However, she returned to competition in 2010 after becoming a mother.

== Personal life ==
Outside of cycling she works as a cycling coach and physical training and she is an entrepreneur of a gym and a bike distribution, and she is also a singer and songwriter.

== Major results ==
1998
3rd Road race, National Road Championships
5th Time trial, UCI Junior Road World Championships
2000
4th Tour de Berne
2001
1st Time trial, National Road Championships
2002
2nd Time trial, National Road Championships
2003
3rd Time trial, National Road Championships
2010
2nd Road race, National Road Championships
2013
1st Time trial, National Road Championships
2014
2nd Road race, National Road Championships
6th Overall 4Tour of Zhoushan Island
9th Grand Prix el Salvador
9th GP du Canton d'Argovie
2015
3rd Time trial, National Road Championships
2016
National Road Championships

2nd Time trial
3rd Road race

4th VR Women ITT
7th Horizon Park Women Challenge
2017
National Road Championships

2nd Time trial
3rd Road race

2018
3rd Time trial, National Road Championships
2019
2nd Time trial, National Road Championships
