= 2008 Tour de Wallonie =

Race details
- Dates: 26–30 July 2008
- Stages: 5
- Distance: 909.6 km (565.2 mi)
- Winning time: 22h 32' 08"

Results
	Winner	Sergei Ivanov (RUS)
	Second	Greg Van Avermaet (BEL)
	Third	Paolo Bettini (ITA)

The 2008 Tour de Wallonie was the 35th edition of the Tour de Wallonie cycle race and was held from 26 to 30 July 2008. The race started in Tubize and finished in Aubel. The race was won by Sergei Ivanov.

== General classification ==
Final general classification

Rank	Rider	Time
1	Sergei Ivanov (RUS)	22h 32' 08"
2	Greg Van Avermaet (BEL)	+ 19"
3	Paolo Bettini (ITA)	+ 23"
4	Marco Marcato (ITA)	+ 39"
5	Jussi Veikkanen (FIN)	+ 39"
6	Alexandr Kolobnev (RUS)	+ 41"
7	Nicolas Roche (IRL)	+ 42"
8	Serge Pauwels (BEL)	+ 43"
9	Jurgen Van Goolen (BEL)	+ 43"
10	Anders Lund (DEN)	+ 45"
