= Mälarenergi =

Swedish company

Mälarenergi AB

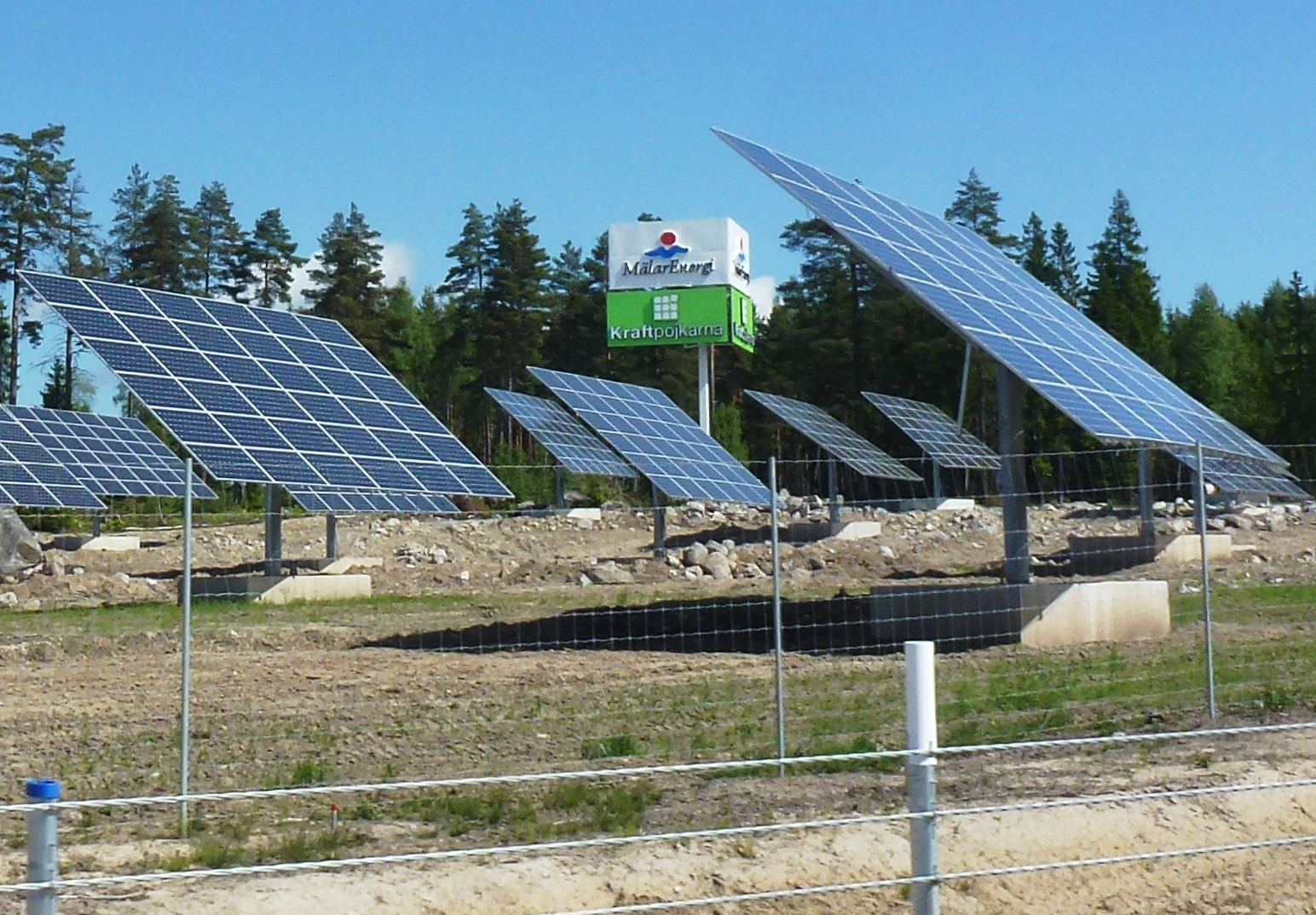
- Mälarenergi/Kraftpojkarna solar park
- Headquarters: Västerås, Sweden
- Products: Electricity production, district heating, broadband, tap water, waste water purification
- Number of employees: 615 (December 2013)
- Website: www.malarenergi.se

Mälarenergi AB is a city-owned electric power and district heating provider based in Västerås, Sweden. Mälarenergi has around 600 employees and three subsidiaries: Mälarenergi Elnät AB, Fibra AB (including the subsidiary SamKom AB), and Mälarenergi Vatten AB.

The company owns the grid in Västmanland and produces electricity, district heating and cooling with a turnover of 3.0 billion SEK, and 145 000 customers, as of 2009.

Mälarenergi owns and operates a number of plants, mostly for the production of electricity and heating but also plants for tap water production and waste water purification. The biggest plant is Kraftvärmeverket in Västerås. This is Sweden's largest combined power and heating plant, and the newest part, called Block 6, can use waste as fuel.

On Wednesday 5 February 2014, the Nordic region's largest solar park for the production of electricity using solar energy was inaugurated. The solar plant has an output of 1.2 million Watts and is located along the E18 between Västerås and Enköping. Solparken is a collaboration between Mälarenergi AB and Kraftpojkarna AB.
