= Stef Clement =

Dutch road bicycle racer (born 1982)

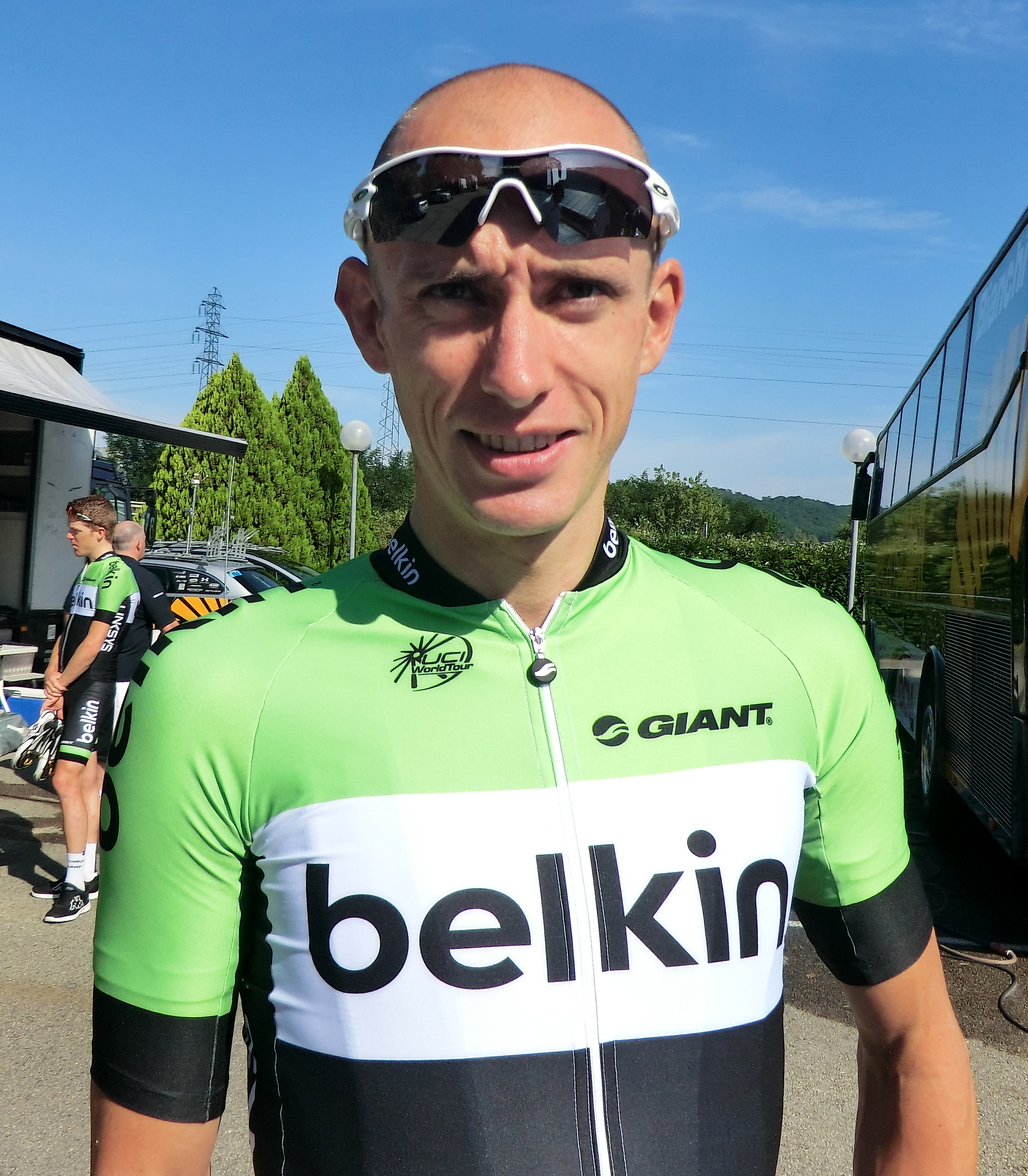
- Clement at the 2013 Tour de l'Ain

Personal information
- Full name: Stef Clement
- Born: 24 September 1982 (age 44) Tilburg, the Netherlands
- Height: 1.81 m (5 ft 11 in)
- Weight: 66 kg (146 lb; 10.4 st)

Cycling career
- Sport: Cycling
- Current team: Retired
- Discipline: Road
- Role: Rider
- Rider type: Time trialist

Amateur teams
- 2003: Van Hemert Groep CT
- 2004–2005: Rabobank GS3

Professional teams
- 2006–2008: Bouygues Télécom
- 2009–2014: Rabobank
- 2015–2016: IAM Cycling
- 2017–2018: LottoNL–Jumbo

Major wins
- One-day races and Classics National Time Trial Championships (2006, 2007, 2009, 2011)
Medal record
Representing the Netherlands
Men's road bicycle racing
World Championships
Bronze medal – third place	2007 Stuttgart	Time Trial
European Games
Silver medal – second place	2015 Baku	Time trial

Stef Clement (born 24 September 1982 in Tilburg) is a Dutch former professional cyclist, who competed between 2003 and 2018 for the Van Hemert Groep CT, Rabobank Continental Team, Bouygues Télécom, IAM Cycling and LottoNL–Jumbo squads. He specialized in the time trial discipline, winning the Dutch National Time Trial Championships on four occasions. He also won the bronze medal in the 2007 World Championships time trial.

In December 2014 he was announced as part of the squad for the IAM Cycling team for 2015, joining the team alongside fellow Belkin Pro Cycling rider David Tanner. He returned to the renamed LottoNL–Jumbo team in 2017, when IAM Cycling folded.

== Major results ==
2002
1st Time trial, National Under-23 Road Championships
2003
1st Stage 7 Olympia's Tour
5th Overall Tour of Slovenia
2004
6th Chrono des Nations U23
2005
1st Overall Olympia's Tour
2nd Chrono Champenois
6th Rund um Düren
7th Overall Cinturón a Mallorca

1st Stage 1 (ITT)

2006
1st Time trial, National Road Championships
1st Stage 9 (ITT) Tour de l'Avenir
5th Chrono des Nations
10th Overall Circuit de la Sarthe
2007
1st Time trial, National Road Championships
3rd Time trial, UCI Road World Championships
3rd Chrono des Nations
2008
1st Chrono des Nations
5th Overall Circuit de la Sarthe
9th Time trial, Olympic Games
9th Overall Critérium International
10th Overall Bayern–Rundfahrt
2009
1st Time trial, National Road Championships
1st Stage 8 Critérium du Dauphiné Libéré
4th Overall Vuelta a Castilla y León
2010
6th Overall Vuelta a Murcia
2011
1st Time trial, National Road Championships
4th Chrono des Nations
8th Overall USA Pro Cycling Challenge
2014
Volta a Catalunya

1st Mountains classification
1st Stage 6

8th London–Surrey Classic
2015
2nd Time trial, European Games
2016
2nd Overall Arctic Race of Norway
2017
2nd Time trial, National Road Championships
8th Overall Tour de l'Ain

=== Grand Tour general classification results timeline ===
Grand Tour	2006	2007	2008	2009	2010	2011	2012	2013	2014	2015	2016	2017
Giro d'Italia	64	—	—	—	—	107	71	48	—	DNF	—	23
Tour de France	—	DNF	87	117	—	—	—	—	DNF	59	18	—
Vuelta a España	—	32	DNF	—	—	—	100	DNF	69	—	—	29

Legend
—	Did not compete
DNF	Did not finish

== See also ==
- List of Dutch Olympic cyclists

Sporting positions
Preceded by Thomas Dekker	Dutch National Time Trial; Champion; 2006, 2007	Succeeded by Lars Boom
Preceded by Lars Boom	Dutch National Time Trial; Champion; 2009	Succeeded by Jos van Emden
Preceded by Jos van Emden	Dutch National Time Trial; Champion; 2011	Succeeded by Lieuwe Westra
