= Jukka Heinikainen =

Finnish cyclist

Personal information
- Full name: Jukka Heinikainen
- Born: 22 July 1972 (age 54) Kuusankoski, Finland

Cycling career
- Sport: Cycling
- Role: Rider

Jukka Heinikainen (born 22 July 1972) is a Finnish former racing cyclist. He won the Finnish national road race title in 2002. He also competed in the pursuit event at the 1996 Summer Olympics.
