= Knut Anders Fostervold =

Norwegian footballer and cyclist (born 1971)

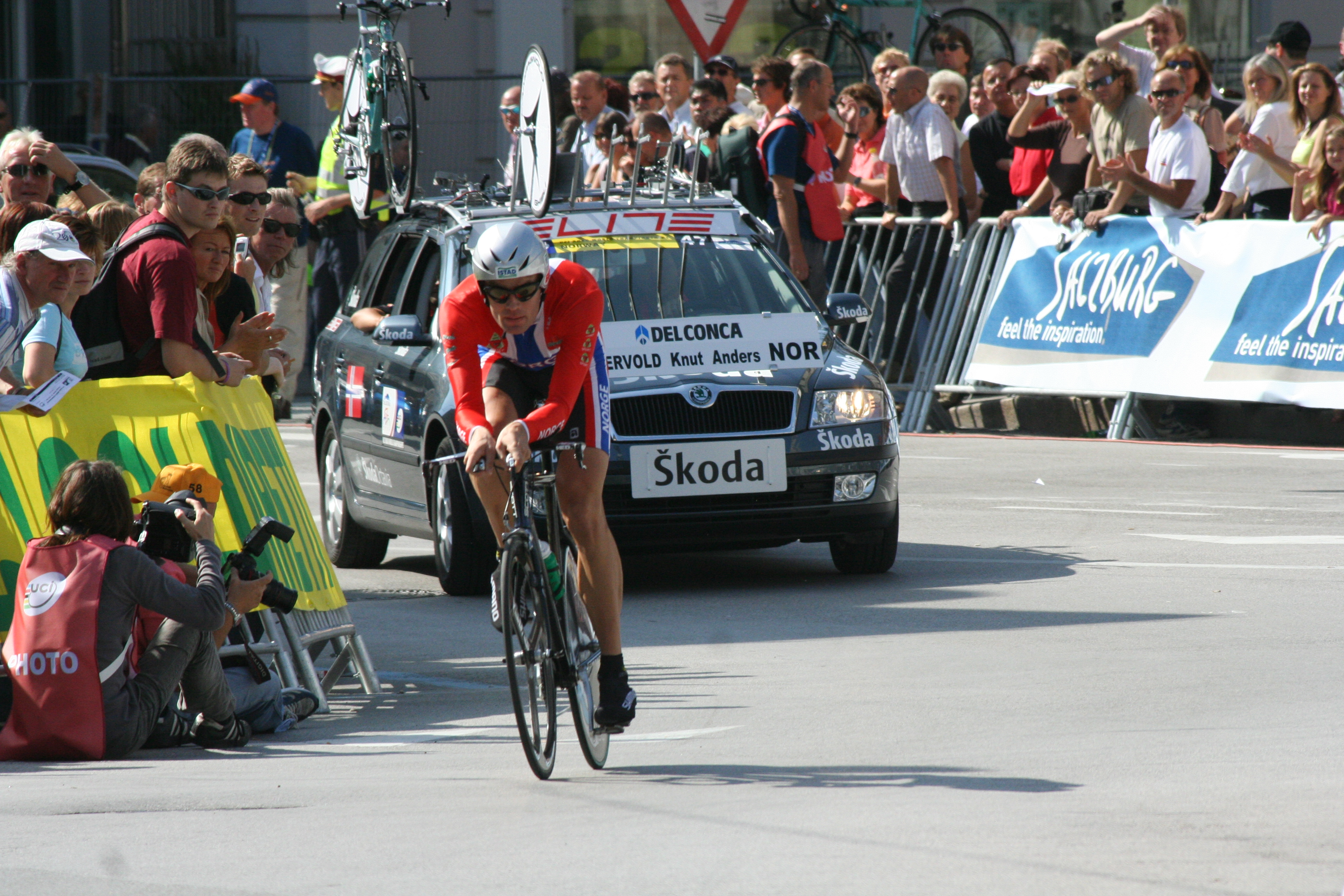
- Fostervold at the UCI Road World Championships 2006 in Salzburg.

Personal information
- Full name: Knut Anders Fostervold
- Date of birth: 4 October 1971 (age 55)
- Place of birth: Oslo, Norway
- Height: 1.89 m (6 ft 2 in)
- Position: Midfielder

Youth career
- 1990–1991: Rival

Senior career*
Years	Team	Apps	(Gls)
1991	Sandefjord		
1992	Stokke IL		
1993	Eik-Tønsberg		
1994–2002	Molde FK	172	(13)
2000–2001	→ Grimsby Town (loan)	10	(0)
- * Club domestic league appearances and goals

Knut Anders Fostervold (born 4 October 1971) is a Norwegian former footballer and cyclist. As a footballer he played as a midfielder and defender from 1991 until 2002, notably played for Molde FK and Grimsby Town. He also played for Sandefjord, Stokke IL and Eik-Tønsberg

== Football career ==
=== Early career ===
Fostervold started his career in Rival, and then played in Vestfold for Sandefjord, Stokke IL and Eik-Tønsberg.

=== Molde ===
In 1994, Fostervold returned to his hometown and started to play for Molde FK. He got his debut for the club on 1 May 1994 in a second tier game against Åndalsnes.

Fostervold played 172 matches for Molde from 1994 to 2002 as a centre-back and scored 13 goals. He also captained the team for four years, from 1996 to 1999.

Fostervold is well known for a dive he took while playing for Molde in the match against Stabæk on 18 September 1999. After being hit in the face by Pétur Marteinsson, Fostervold waited for a few seconds before throwing himself to the ground, clutching his face in an attempt to attract the referee's attention. Footage of the dive has become popular on video sharing platforms. John Carew parodied the dive in celebration after scoring a goal in another match.

=== Grimsby Town (loan) ===
Fostervold joined Grimsby Town on loan during the 2000–01 season, after manager Lennie Lawrence brought in several foreign imports on a loan basis.

== Cycling career ==
He retired from football due to injury in 2003, and now competes in cycling.

Fostervold won a bronze medal in the Norwegian national time-trial championships in 2005, behind former world under-23 time trial champions and Tour de France stage winners Thor Hushovd and Kurt Asle Arvesen. He won another bronze in 2006, and won silver in 2007 behind Edvald Boasson Hagen. In 2006 and 2007 he represented Norway in the world championship time trial (placing 43rd and 51st respectively).
