= Paula Suominen =

Finnish cyclist

Personal information
- Full name: Paula Suominen
- Born: 20 March 1977 (age 49)

Cycling career
- Sport: Cycling
- Role: Rider

Paula Suominen (born 20 March 1977) is a Finnish former racing cyclist. She finished in second place in the Finnish National Road Race Championships in 2007.
