= Marco Pinotti =

Italian cyclist

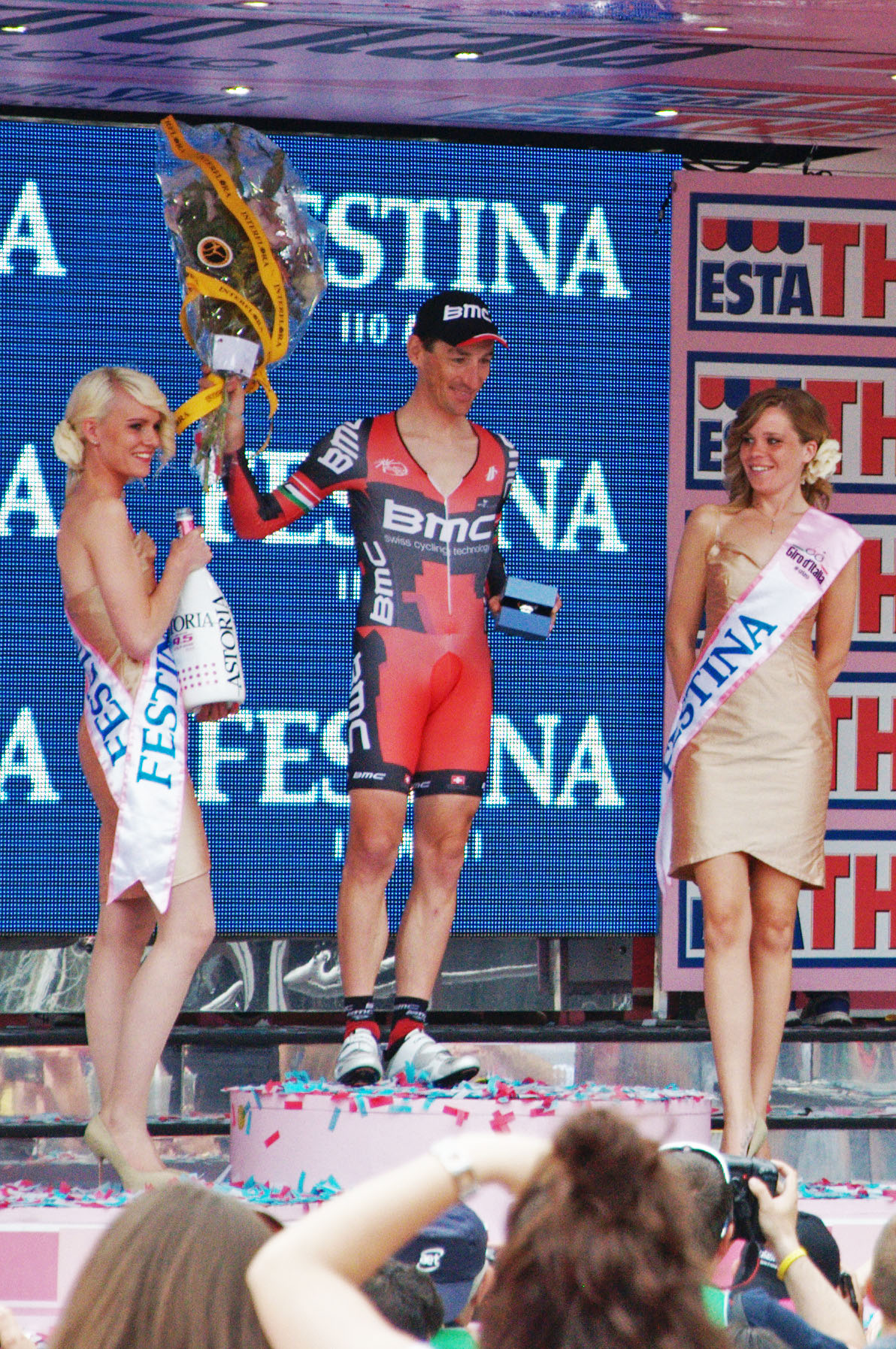
- Pinotti at the 2012 Giro d'Italia.

Personal information
- Full name: Marco Pinotti
- Nicknames: L'Ingegnere (The Engineer), Il Professore (The Professor)
- Born: 25 February 1976 (age 50) Osio Sotto, Italy
- Height: 1.77 m (5 ft 9 1/2 in)
- Weight: 67 kg (148 lb)

Cycling career
- Sport: Cycling
- Discipline: Road
- Role: Rider
- Rider type: Time Trialist

Professional teams
- 1998: → Polti (stagiaire)
- 1999–2004: Lampre–Daikin
- 2005–2006: Saunier Duval–Prodir
- 2007–2011: T-Mobile Team
- 2012–2013: BMC Racing Team

Major wins
- Grand Tours Giro d'Italia 2 individual stages (2008, 2012) 2 TTT stages (2009, 2011) Stage races Tour of Ireland (2008) One-day races and Classics National Time Trial Championships (2005, 2007–2010, 2013)
Medal record
Men's road bicycle racing
Representing BMC Racing Team
World Championships
Silver medal – second place	2012 Valkenburg	Team time trial

Marco Pinotti (born 25 February 1976 in Osio Sotto, Lombardy) is an Italian former road racing cyclist, who competed as a professional between 1999 and 2013. An individual time trial specialist, Pinotti was a six-time Italian Time Trial Champion (2005, 2007, 2008, 2009, 2010 and 2013).

== Career ==
As an amateur he won 28 races before turning professional in 1999 with the Lampre–Daikin team. He won the Grand Prix d'Europa in 1999 together with his teammate Raivis Belohvoščiks and the 5th stage of the 2000 Tour de Pologne.

In 2001 he finished second in stage 15 of the Tour de France behind Belgian Rik Verbrugghe. He had surgery on his ulna in November 2001 and started training again only in February 2002. He returned to competition in April 2002.

The 2003 season brought some victories as he won the 4th stage in the Tour of the Basque Country and the King of the Mountains classification. In the Bici Vasca he crashed and broke his pelvis, forcing recuperation. He has since fully recovered. His speciality is in individual time trials.

Pinotti joined the then newly formed Spanish team Saunier Duval–Prodir team in 2005. He won the Italian National Time Trial Championship in 2005. Pinotti came second to Luca Ascani in the 2007 Italian National time trials but Ascani was found to have tested positive for EPO and Pinotti was awarded the jersey. Pinotti retained the title in 2008.

At the 2007 Giro d'Italia, Pinotti placed second in stage six to Spoleto and took over the leader's pink jersey. He held it for four stages. In 2008, he won the final stage time trial, and again in 2012. In 2009 and 2011, he help his teams win the team time trial. The result in 2011 helped him take over the pink jersey for one day.

In 2008, Pinotti joined team Highroad, which became Columbia HighRoad in 2009 and HTC-Columbia in 2010.

Pinotti joined the BMC Racing Team for 2012 following the disbanding of the HTC–Highroad team. At the end of the year, he released a book, Il Mestiere Del Ciclista Una Vita In Bicicletta (The Cycling Professor).

In October 2013 Pinotti announced that he would retire from racing after competing in the Tour of Beijing and Chrono des Nations, transitioning to a position in the Sports Science division of BMC Racing Team.

== Career achievements ==
=== Major results ===
1999
7th Firenze–Pistoia
2000
1st Stage 5 Tour de Pologne
2nd Duo Normand (with László Bodrogi)
4th Giro di Toscana
7th Grand Prix des Nations
9th Overall Ronde van Nederland
10th Time trial, UCI Road World Championships
2001
9th Gran Premio Città di Camaiore
2002
6th Firenze–Pistoia
2003
Tour of the Basque Country

1st Mountains classification
1st Stage 4

9th Overall Tour de Luxembourg
10th Overall Peace Race
2004
3rd Time trial, National Road Championships
6th Grand Prix Eddy Merckx
8th Giro della Romagna
10th Overall Ronde van Nederland
10th Chrono des Herbiers
2005
1st Time trial, National Road Championships
4th Firenze–Pistoia
3rd Overall Tour de Georgia
8th Chrono des Herbiers
2006
2nd Time trial, National Road Championships
8th Overall Tour de Georgia
2007
1st Time trial, National Road Championships
4th Grand Prix Pino Cerami
Giro d'Italia

Held after Stages 6–9

2008
1st Time trial, National Road Championships
1st Overall Tour of Ireland
1st Stage 21 (ITT) Giro d'Italia
2nd Firenze–Pistoia
2nd GP Triberg-Schwarzwald
3rd Overall Tour de Romandie
4th Chrono des Nations
9th Overall Danmark Rundt
2009
1st Time trial, National Road Championships
1st Stage 5 Tour of the Basque Country
1st Stage 1 (TTT) Giro d'Italia
1st Stage 3 (TTT) Tour de Romandie
3rd Overall Tour of Missouri
5th Time trial, UCI Road World Championships
5th Overall Tour of Ireland
6th Overall Sachsen Tour
9th Clásica de San Sebastián
2010
1st Time trial, National Road Championships
4th Overall Tour of Oman
7th Overall Tour de Romandie

1st Prologue

5th Overall Tour of the Basque Country
9th Overall Giro d'Italia
2011
Giro d'Italia

1st Stage 1 (TTT)
Held after Stage 1

4th Overall Tour de Romandie
6th Overall Tirreno–Adriatico
2012
1st Stage 21 (ITT) Giro d'Italia
1st Sprints classification, Tour of the Basque Country
2nd Team time trial, UCI Road World Championships
3rd Time trial, National Road Championships
5th Time trial, Olympic Games
6th Overall Tour of Austria

1st Stage 7 (ITT)

9th Overall Giro del Trentino

1st Stage 1 (TTT)

2013
1st Time trial, National Road Championships
4th Chrono des Nations
7th Time trial, UCI Road World Championships

Grand Tour general classification results timeline

Grand Tour	1999	2000	2001	2002	2003	2004	2005	2006	2007	2008	2009	2010	2011	2012	2013
Giro d'Italia	—	—	—	—	—	—	48	60	18	65	40	9	DNF	41	—
Tour de France	113	—	52	DNF	—	—	—	—	—	—	—	—	—	—	—
Vuelta a España	—	—	DNF	—	—	—	—	—	—	—	—	—	—	—	DNF

Legend
—	Did not compete
DNF	Did not finish

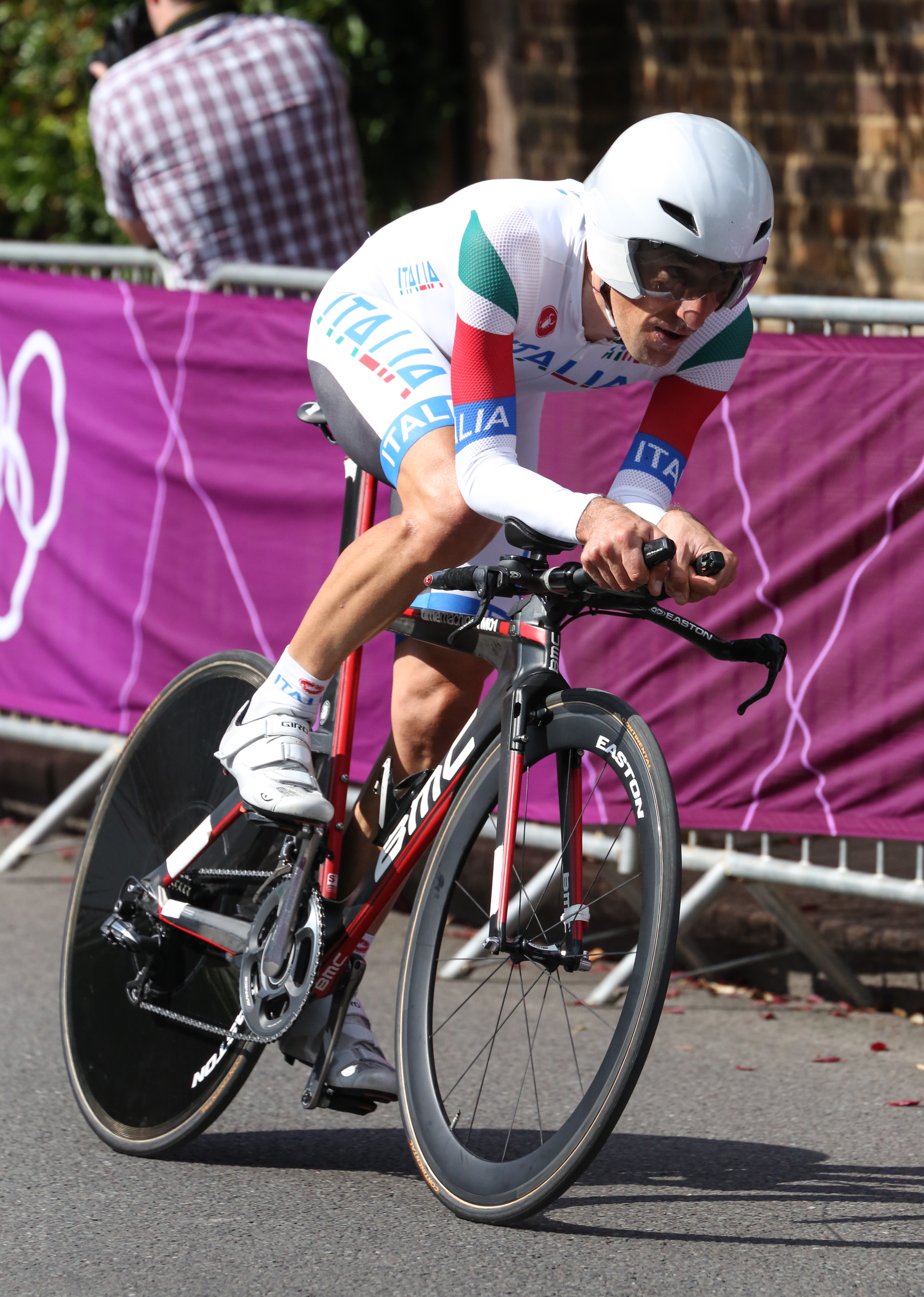
Pinotti competing in the 2012 Olympics time trial in London
