= Matti Helminen =

Finnish cyclist

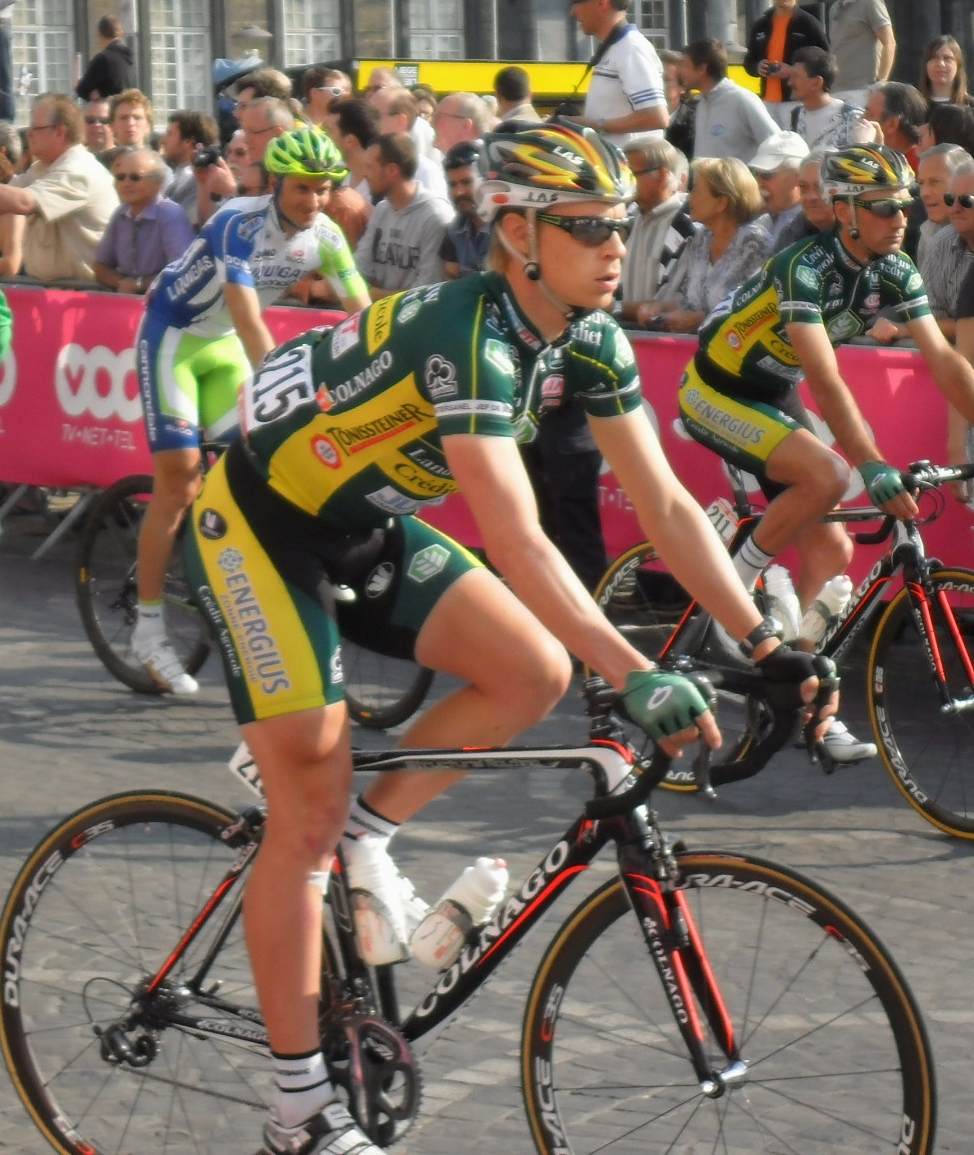
- Helminen at the 2011 Liège–Bastogne–Liège

Personal information
- Full name: Matti Helminen
- Born: 14 August 1975 (age 51) Kotka, Finland
- Height: 1.84 m (6 ft 0 in)
- Weight: 76 kg (168 lb)

Cycling career
- Sport: Cycling
- Discipline: Road
- Role: Rider
- Rider type: Time trialist

Amateur teams
- 2015: Zannata Cycling Team
- 2016–2020: VP Consulting–Zannata CT

Professional teams
- 2005–2006: Profel Continental Team
- 2007: DFL–Cyclingnews–Litespeed
- 2008–2009: Palmans–Cras
- 2009: Cycling Club Bourgas
- 2011–2012: Landbouwkrediet

Matti Helminen (born 14 August 1975) is a Finnish racing cyclist. He won the Finnish National Time Trial Championships six times between 2003 and 2012, and finished in third place in the Finnish National Road Race Championships in 2008, 2009 and 2015.

Helminen tested positive for Probenecid at the 2012 Tour de Luxembourg and was handed a two-years suspension for doping. He appealed against this decision to the Court of Arbitration for Sport.

== Major results ==
2001
National Road Championships

3rd Time trial
5th Road race

2002
3rd Time trial, National Road Championships
2003
National Road Championships

1st Time trial
4th Road race

2004
5th Road race, National Road Championships
9th Overall Triptyque Ardennais
2005
3rd Time trial, National Road Championships
4th Omloop van de Vlaamse Scheldeboorden
2006
1st Time trial, National Road Championships
1st Chrono Champenois
3rd Chrono des Nations
2007
1st Time trial, National Road Championships
4th Grote Prijs Jef Scherens
7th Chrono des Nations
9th Druivenkoers Overijse
2008
National Road Championships

1st Time trial
3rd Road race

3rd Chrono Champenois
2009
National Road Championships

2nd Time trial
3rd Road race

9th Chrono Champenois
2010
National Road Championships

1st Time trial
5th Road race

2nd Chrono Champenois
8th Duo Normand (with Jarmo Rissanen)
2011
2nd Time trial, National Road Championships
2012
National Road Championships

1st Time trial
4th Road race

2015
National Road Championships

2nd Time trial
3rd Road race

2016
4th Time trial, National Road Championships
2017
2nd Time trial, National Road Championships
2019
2nd Time trial, National Road Championships
