= Brian Vandborg =

Danish cyclist (born 1981)

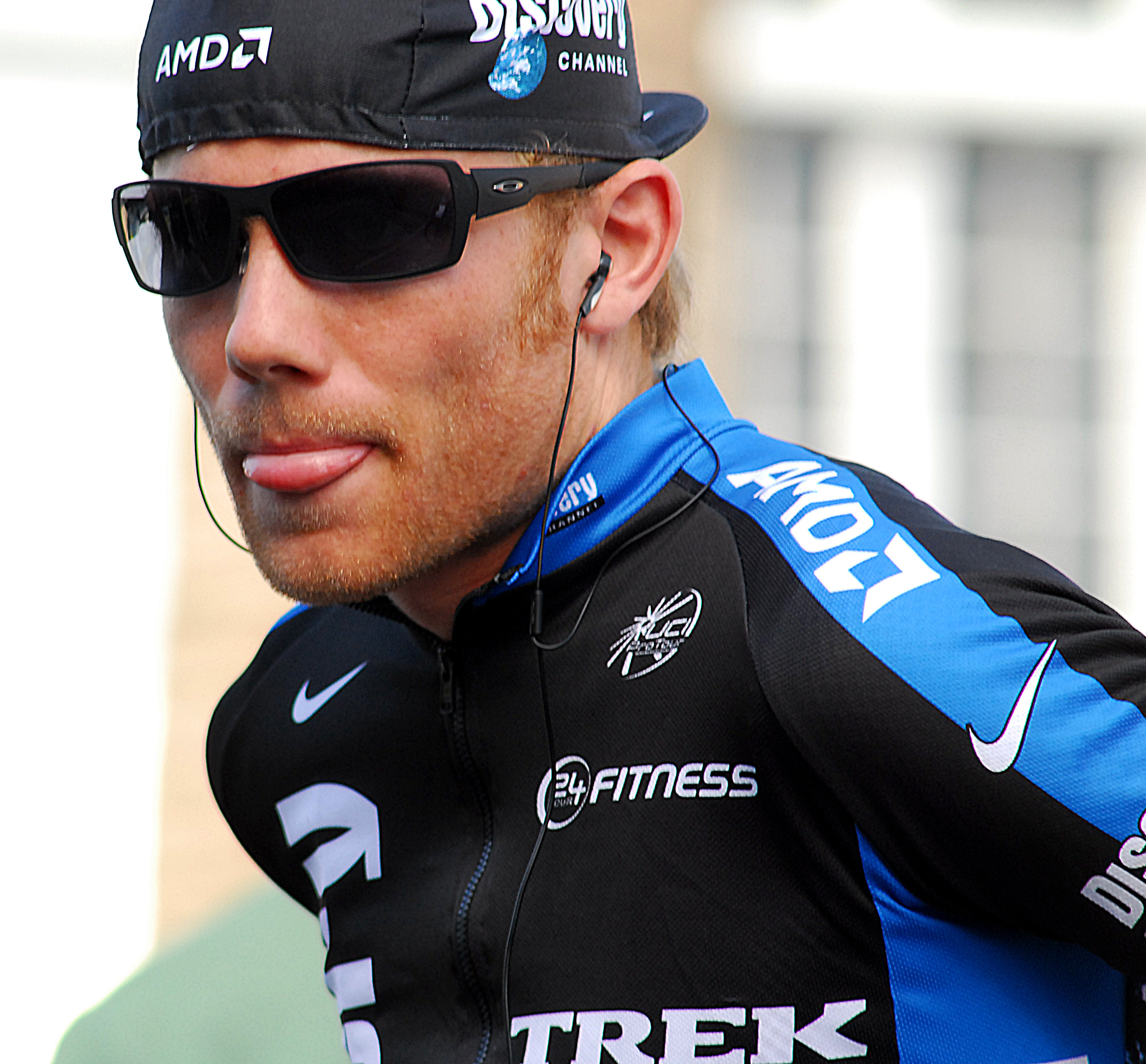
- Vandborg at the 2007 Tour of California

Personal information
- Full name: Brian Bach Vandborg
- Born: 4 December 1981 (age 44) Snejbjerg, Herning, Denmark
- Height: 1.87 m (6 ft 2 in)
- Weight: 75 kg (165 lb; 11.8 st)

Cycling career
- Sport: Cycling
- Discipline: Road
- Role: Rider
- Rider type: Time trialist

Professional teams
- 2004–2006: Team CSC
- 2007: Discovery Channel
- 2008: Team GLS
- 2009–2010: Liquigas
- 2011: Saxo Bank–SunGard
- 2012: SpiderTech–C10
- 2013: Cannondale

Major wins
- National Time Trial Championships (2006, 2013)

Brian Bach Vandborg (born 4 December 1981) is a Danish former professional road bicycle racer, who competed as a professional between 2004 and 2013. Over his career, Vandborg competed for Team CSC (twice), Discovery Channel, Team GLS, Liquigas–Doimo, SpiderTech–C10 and Cannondale.

Born in Snejbjerg, Herning, Vandborg was national U/23 champion in individual time trial in 2002 and 2003 and in 2004 he signed his first professional contract with Team CSC, with a length of two years. He won stage 4 of Tour de Georgia in 2005, his first professional victory, but the rest of his season was ruined due to a case of mononucleosis.

In 2006, Vandborg became a national champion by capturing the Danish Individual Time Trial Championship; he later finished fourth at the World Time Trial Championship. Vandborg moved to Discovery Channel for the 2007 season. In 2009 he rode alongside Ivan Basso and Daniele Bennati at Liquigas. Vandborg also rode for the Saxo Bank–SunGard team in 2011, and SpiderTech–C10 in 2012.

Vandborg retired at the end of the 2013 season, after ten years as a professional.

== Major results ==
2002
National Under-23 Road Championships

1st Time trial
3rd Road race

2003
National Under-23 Road Championships

1st Time trial
2nd Road race

3rd Time trial, National Road Championships
3rd Eschborn–Frankfurt Under–23
2004
3rd Time trial, National Road Championships
4th Overall Danmark Rundt
9th Overall Tour of Georgia
2005
1st Stage 4 Tour of Georgia
2006
1st Time trial, National Road Championships
2nd Chrono des Nations
3rd Overall Circuit Cycliste Sarthe
4th Time trial, UCI Road World Championships
5th Overall Circuit Franco-Belge
6th Overall Bayern Rundfahrt
7th Overall Étoile de Bessèges
2007
1st Stage 2 Tour de l'Ain
2nd Time trial, National Road Championships
2008
1st Stage 3 Tour du Loir-et-Cher
2nd Overall Circuit des Ardennes
5th Duo Normand
8th Chrono Champenois
2009
National Road Championships

4th Road race
5th Time trial

2010
6th Tre Valli Varesine
2012
5th Time trial, National Road Championships
2013
1st Time trial, National Road Championships

=== Grand Tour general classification results timeline ===
| Grand Tour | 2004 | 2005 | 2006 | 2007 | 2008 | 2009 | 2010 | 2011 | 2012 | 2013 |
|---|---|---|---|---|---|---|---|---|---|---|
| Giro d'Italia | — | 140 | — | DNF | — | — | — | — | — | — |
| Tour de France | — | — | — | — | — | 116 | 128 | 125 | — | 155 |
| Vuelta a España | DNF | — | — | — | — | — | — | — | — | — |

Legend
| — | Did not compete |
| DNF | Did not finish |
