= Gustav Larsson =

Swedish cyclist

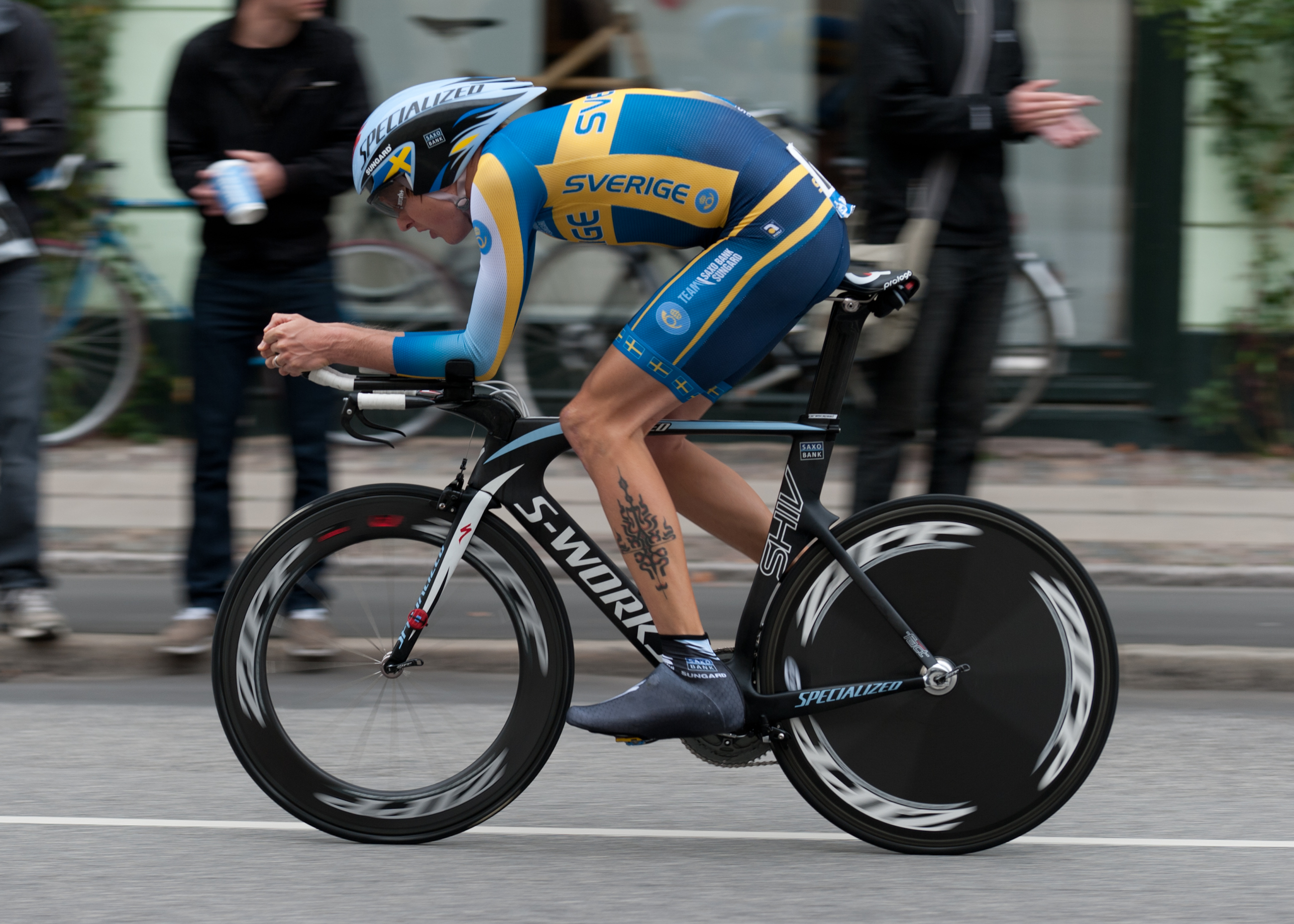
- Larsson during the time trial at the 2011 UCI Road World Championships

Personal information
- Full name: Gustav Erik Larsson
- Born: 20 September 1980 (age 46) Gemla, Sweden
- Height: 194 cm (6 ft 4 in)

Cycling career
- Sport: Cycling
- Current team: Retired
- Discipline: Road
- Role: Rider
- Rider type: Puncheur; Time trialist

Professional teams
- 2001–2002: Crescent
- 2003–2005: Fassa Bortolo
- 2006: Française des Jeux
- 2007: Unibet.com
- 2008–2011: Team CSC
- 2012: Vacansoleil–DCM
- 2013–2014: IAM Cycling
- 2015: Cult Energy Pro Cycling
- 2016: Team ColoQuick–Cult

Major wins
- Grand Tours Giro d'Italia 1 individual stage (2010) One-day races and Classics National Time Trial Championships (2006, 2007, 2010–2013, 2015)
Medal record
Men's road bicycle racing
Representing Sweden
Olympic Games
Silver medal – second place	2008 Beijing	Road time trial
World Championships
Silver medal – second place	2009 Mendrisio	Time trial

Gustav Erik Larsson (born 20 September 1980) is a Swedish former professional road racing cyclist, who rode professionally between 2001 and 2016 for nine different teams. Larsson specialised as a time trialist, winning the Swedish National Time Trial Championships seven times between 2006 and 2015, and won silver medals at the Beijing Olympics in 2008 and the 2009 World Championships in Mendrisio.

== Professional career ==
On the international scene he represented Team Saxo Bank, and in Sweden he represented Skoghalls CK-Hammarö. Gemla-born Larsson began cycling when he was 14 years and, having shown great talent and dedication, turned pro just 7 years later. Team Fassa Bortolo was his first employer, and when the team shut down in 2005 he moved on to Team Française des Jeux. He rode for one year for Française des Jeux before moving again to the Swedish-Belgian team Unibet.com, which had gained a wild card to the UCI ProTour in 2006. But just as the 2007 season started the team ran into trouble with the Amaury Sport Organisation who made it clear that Unibet.com would not be invited to Paris–Nice or the Tour de France. Other major race organizers followed suit, which resulted in Unibet.com not getting any major invitations. The team shut down shortly thereafter. Team CSC showed interest in Larsson, and he rode for them in 2008. After the 2008 season, it was reported that Larsson had signed with Caisse d'Epargne for 2009, but he continued with Team Saxo Bank. He remained with the team until the end of 2011, when he moved to Vacansoleil–DCM. Larsson left Vacansoleil–DCM at the end of the 2012 season, and joined the new Swiss-based team IAM Cycling team for the 2013 season. Larsson signed for the Cult Energy Pro Cycling team for the 2015 season.

In March 2015 Larsson made an attempt on the hour record at a Revolution meeting at Manchester Velodrome. He failed to beat Rohan Dennis' world record of 52.491 kilometres (32.616 miles) but his distance of 50.016 kilometres (31.079 miles) was a new Swedish hour record.

== Personal life ==
He resides in Monaco with his wife Veronica Andrèasson, who also competed as a road racing cyclist. The couple own Vélo Monaco, a cycling holiday organisation.

== Major results ==
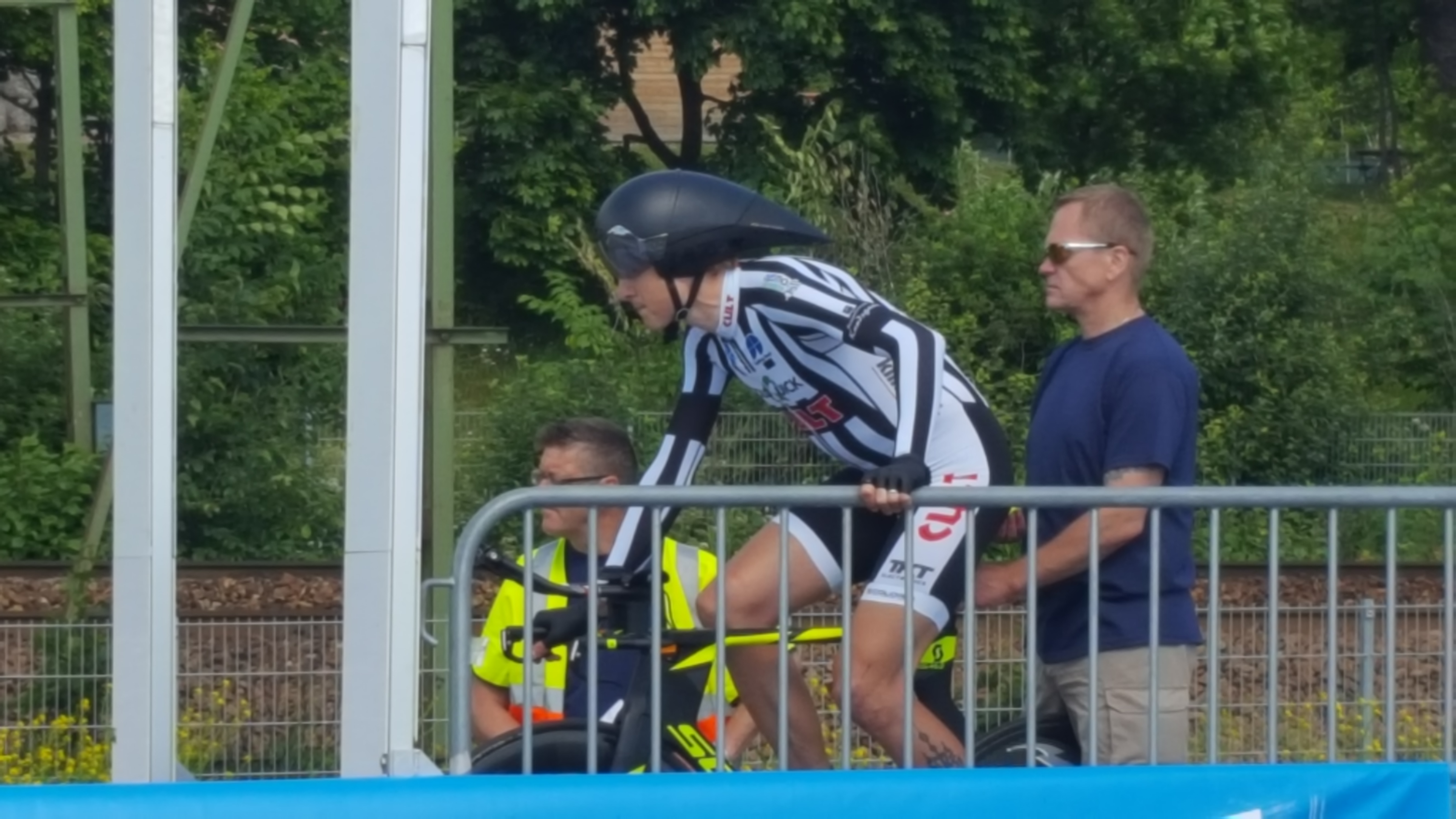
Larsson at the 2016 Swedish National Time Trial Championships, where he finished third.

2001
1st Stage 4b Grand Prix Guillaume Tell
2nd Time trial, National Road Championships
2002
1st Overall Okolo Slovenska

1st Young rider classification
1st Stage 5 (ITT)

1st Stage 4 Brandenburg–Rundfahrt
2nd Time trial, National Road Championships
2nd Overall Grand Prix Guillaume Tell

1st Stage 5a

3rd Overall Ringerike GP

1st Stage 1

4th Time trial, UEC European Under-23 Road Championships
2004
4th Time trial, UCI Road World Championships
2006
1st Time trial, National Road Championships
2007
National Road Championships

1st Time trial
3rd Road race

3rd Overall Eneco Tour
3rd Duo Normand (with Víctor Hugo Peña)
5th Overall Tour Down Under
6th Chrono des Nations
7th Overall Tour de Luxembourg
8th Overall Deutschland Tour
2008
2nd Time trial, Olympic Games
2nd Time trial, National Road Championships
2nd Overall Critérium International
4th Overall Danmark Rundt

1st Stage 5 (ITT)

5th Time trial, UCI Road World Championships
5th Overall Tour of California
5th Overall Sachsen Tour
6th Overall Tirreno–Adriatico
2009
1st Overall Tour du Poitou Charentes et de la Vienne

1st Stage 3 (ITT)

2nd Time trial, UCI Road World Championships
2nd Overall Tour of Missouri
7th Overall Tour de Luxembourg
10th Japan Cup
2010
National Road Championships

1st Time trial
2nd Road race

1st Overall Tour du Limousin

1st Stage 2 (ITT)

1st Stage 21 (ITT) Giro d'Italia
1st Stage 1 (ITT) Vuelta a la Comunidad de Madrid
4th Chrono des Nations
7th Overall Vuelta a Andalucía
10th Time trial, UCI Road World Championships
2011
1st Time trial, National Road Championships
2nd Chrono des Nations
2012
1st Time trial, National Road Championships
1st Stage 1 (ITT) Paris–Nice
8th Chrono des Nations
2013
1st Time trial, National Road Championships
2nd Chrono des Nations
5th Overall Tour du Poitou-Charentes
8th Overall Tour Méditerranéen
9th Time trial, UCI Road World Championships
2014
4th Overall Tour of Norway
2015
1st Time trial, National Road Championships
9th Overall Bayern–Rundfahrt
9th Overall Tour of Norway
2016
3rd Time trial, National Road Championships

=== Grand Tour general classification results timeline ===
Grand Tour	2006	2007	2008	2009	2010	2011	2012
Giro d'Italia	66	—	14	—	59	—	35
Tour de France	105	—	—	50	—	—	DNF
Vuelta a España	—	—	—	—	20	—	—

Legend
—	Did not compete
DNF	Did not finish
