= Benjamin Day (cyclist) =

Australian racing cyclist

Personal information
- Full name: Benjamin John Day
- Born: 11 December 1978 (age 47) Corinda, Australia

Cycling career
- Sport: Cycling
- Current team: Retired
- Discipline: Road
- Role: Rider

Amateur teams
- 2000: Smartplay
- 2001: Sunsmart–Mitsubishi
- 2001: Kia–Suisse

Professional teams
- 2002: Ambra–Obuwie–SNC Odziez
- 2002: Matesica–Abóboda
- 2003: Carvalhelhos–Boavista
- 2004–2005: MrBookmaker.com–SportsTech
- 2006: Carvalhelhos–Boavista
- 2007: Navigators Insurance
- 2008: Toyota–United
- 2009–2010: Fly V Australia
- 2011: Kenda–5-hour Energy
- 2012–2014: UnitedHealthcare

Benjamin John Day (born 11 December 1978 in Corinda, Queensland) is an Australian professional road racing cyclist, who rode professionally between 2002 and 2014.

== Major results ==
2002
1st Stage 5 (ITT) Volta ao Alentejo
2003
1st Time trial, National Road Championships
2004
1st Stage 5 Tour Down Under
2005
1st GP Zwevezele
5th Overall Tour of Britain
2006
2nd Time trial, Commonwealth Games
2007
1st Overall Tour de Beauce

1st Sprints classification
1st Stage 4a (ITT)

8th Overall Tour of California
2008
2nd Boulevard Road Race
3rd Time trial, National Road Championships
3rd Overall Herald Sun Tour
3rd Overall San Dimas Stage Race
6th Overall Tour of Missouri
2009
1st Overall Callville Bay Classic

1st Stage 1

1st Boulevard Road Race
3rd Overall Redlands Bicycle Classic

1st Stage 1 (ITT)

4th Overall Tour of Tasmania

1st Stage 6

8th Overall Tour de Beauce
2010
1st Overall Tour de Beauce
1st Overall San Dimas Stage Race

1st Stage 1

1st Overall Redlands Bicycle Classic

1st Stage 1 (ITT)

1st Chrono Gatineau
5th Overall Joe Martin Stage Race
2013
6th Overall Tour de Beauce
2014
10th Overall Tour of the Gila
