= Virtanen (surname) =

Origin
- Language: Finnish
- Meaning: Derived from virta ("river, stream")
- Region of origin: Finland

Other names
- Variant form: Virta

Virtanen (also written as Wirtanen) is a surname originating in Finland (in Finnish, virta, meaning "river", and -nen is a surname-generating suffix), where it is the second most common surname. The surname is the namesake of the "Virtanen type" of Finnish surnames.

The name quickly became popular in 19th century, in the era of Finnish national awakening, however rare occasions of it were documented in 1684 at the latest.

Notable people with the surname include:

== Virtanen ==
- Antti Virtanen (born 1977), Finnish ice hockey player
- Artturi Ilmari Virtanen (1895–1973), Finnish chemist and Nobel laureate
- Aulis Virtanen (1926–2006), Finnish sports journalist
- Eemeli Virtanen (born 2002), Finnish ice hockey defenseman
- Eero Virtanen (1915–2003), Finnish wrestler
- Eino Virtanen, multiple people
- Erkki Virtanen (born 1952), Finnish politician and MP
- Fredrik Virtanen (born 1971), Swedish journalist
- Inkeri Virtanen (1921–1962), Finnish trade union official, political organizer and politician
- Jake Virtanen (born 1996), Canadian ice hockey winger
- Jani Virtanen, multiple people
- Janne Virtanen (born 1969), Finnish strongman
- Jesse Virtanen (born 1991), Finnish professional ice hockey defenseman
- Jonne Virtanen (born 1988), Finnish professional ice hockey forward
- Juha Virtanen (born 1987), Finnish ice hockey forward
- Jukka Virtanen, multiple people
- Kalle Virtanen (born 1975), singer and guitarist of the band Viikate
- Kari Virtanen (born 1958), Finnish footballer
- Keijo Virtanen (born 1945), Finnish historian
- Lauri Virtanen (1904–1982), Finnish long-distance runner
- Marko Virtanen (born 1968), Finnish professional ice hockey player
- Mikko Virtanen (born 1994), Finnish ice hockey player
- Miko Virtanen (born 1999), Finnish professional footballer
- Niklas Virtanen (born 1993), Finnish football coach and former footballer
- Oiva Virtanen (1929–1992), Finnish basketball player
- Otso Virtanen (born 1994), Finnish footballer
- Otto Virtanen (born 2001), Finnish tennis player
- Paavo Virtanen (1915–1998), Finnish footballer
- Palle Virtanen (1910–2000), Finnish sprinter
- Pasi Virtanen (born 1964), Finnish tennis coach and former player
- Petri Virtanen (born 1980), Finnish basketball coach and former player
- Rauha S. Virtanen (1931-2019), Finnish author
- Rauli Virtanen (born 1948), Finnish writer, freelance journalist, lecturer and television producer
- Reima Virtanen (born 1947), Finnish boxer and Olympic medal winner
- Sinna Virtanen, Finnish playwright and dramaturge
- Teemu Virtanen (born 1990), Finnish ice hockey player
- Tommi Virtanen (born 1989), Finnish ice hockey goaltender
- Ulla Virtanen (born 1980), Finnish actress, comedian and improviser
- Valtter Virtanen (born 1987), Finnish figure skater
- Veikko Virtanen (1928–2026), Finnish organ builder
- Veltto Virtanen (born 1951), psychologist, rock musician, member of parliament, presidential candidate
- Ville Virtanen, multiple people

== Wirtanen ==
- Atos Wirtanen (1906–79), Ålandic-born Finnish politician
- Carl A. Wirtanen (1910–1990), American astronomer
- Petteri Wirtanen (born 1986), Finnish ice hockey player
- Tommy Wirtanen (born 1983), Finnish footballer
- Toni Wirtanen (born 1975), singer of the band Apulanta

== Fictional characters ==
- B. Virtanen, lead character of the Ilkka Heilä comic strip of the same name
- Virtanen (no first name), hero of Tango is my passion by M.A. Numminen
- Lukas Virtanen, main character of Mark of the Vasirian and subsequent books from the Blackthorn Saga by author Stephanie Denne.

== See also ==
- Virta, the "Laine type" variant
