= Antero =

Antero is a Finnish given name and the Spanish version of the Latin name Anterus. It may refer to:

- Antero Abreu (1927–2017), Angolan author and poet
- Antero Alli (1952–2023), Finnish astrologer
- Ántero Asto, Peruvian politician
- Antero de Quental (1842–1891), Portuguese poet
- Antero Flores Aráoz (born 1942), Peruvian lawyer and politician
- Antero González (1901–1978), Spanish footballer
- Antero Halonen (1938–2016), Finnish boxer
- Antero Kivelä (born 1955), Finnish ice hockey goaltender
- Antero Kivi (1904–1981), Finnish discus thrower
- Antero Laukkanen (1958–2024), Finnish priest and politician
- Antero Lehtonen (born 1954), Finnish ice hockey player
- Antero Leitzinger (born 1962), Finnish political historian
- Antero Manninen (born 1973), Finnish musician
- Antero Mertaranta (born 1956), Finnish sportscaster
- Antero Mongrut, Peruvian runner who competed in the 1948 Summer Olympics
- Antero Niittymäki (born 1980), professional ice hockey goaltender
- Antero Paljakka (born 1969), Finnish shot put player
- Antero Rubín (1851–1923), Spanish general and politician
- Antero Soriano (1888–1929), Philippine senator
- Antero Sotamaa (born 1940), Finnish sailor who competed in the 1972 Summer Olympics
- Antero Svensson (1892–1946), Finnish major general
- Antero Vartia (born 1982), Finnish politician
- Antero Väyrynen (1916–1970), Finnish politician
- Antero Vipunen, in Finnish mythology, giant
- Gabriel Antero (born 1980), Colombian footballer

== See also ==
- Anterograde amnesia, form of amnesia in which the victim cannot create new memories
- Anterograde tracing, research method in the field of neuroscience
- Anterolateral ligament, ligament on the human knee
- Antero Junction, Colorado, ghost town
- Antero Reservoir, reservoir in Colorado
- Antero Resources, an exploration and production company headquartered in Denver, Colorado
- Antero Rokka, a fictional character from the 1954 war novel The Unknown Soldier by Väinö Linna
- Antero Soriano Highway, highway in the Philippines named after the former senator
- Anteros, in Greek mythology, the god of requited love
- Eros/Anteros, the second studio album by Belgian band Oathbreaker
- Mount Antero, mountain in Chaffee County, Colorado named after Chief Antero of the Uintah band of the Ute people
- San Antero, town in Colombia
