= Virtanen =

Virtanen or Wirtanen may refer to:

- Virtanen (surname), a surname
- 46P/Wirtanen, a comet
- 1449 Virtanen, an asteroid
- Virtanen (crater), a lunar crater
- Virtanen, a cocktail with Koskenkorva Viina

== See also ==
- B. Virtanen, Finnish comic strip
