= Kalevi (name) =

Male given name and family name

Kalevi is a Finnish and Estonian masculine given name and surname. Notable people with the name include:

== Given name ==
- Kalevi Aho (born 1949), Finnish composer
- Kalevi Eskelinen (born 1945), Finnish cyclist
- Kalevi Häkkinen (1928–2017), Finnish alpine skier
- Kalevi Hämäläinen (1932–2005), Finnish cross-country skier
- Kalevi Holsti (born 1935), Canadian political scientist
- Kalevi Huotari (1924–1975), Finnish politician
- Kalevi Huuskonen (1932–1999), Finnish biathlete
- Kalevi Kärkinen (1934–2004), Finnish ski jumper
- Kalevi Kiviniemi (1958–2024), Finnish concert organist
- Kalevi Kivistö (born 1941), Finnish politician
- Kalevi Kostiainen (born 1967), Finnish sailor
- Kalevi Kosunen (born 1947), Finnish boxer
- Kalevi Kotkas (1913–1983), Estonian-born Finnish athlete
- Kalevi Kull (born 1952), Estonian scientist
- Kalevi Laitinen (gymnast) (1918–1997), Finnish gymnast
- Kalevi Laitinen (speed skater) (1919–1995), Finnish speed skater
- Kalevi Lehtovirta (1928–2016), Finnish footballer
- Kalevi Laurila (1937–1991), Finnish cross-country skier
- Kalevi Marjamaa (born 1953), Finnish boxer
- Kalevi Mononen (1920–1996), Finnish cross-country skier
- Kalevi Numminen (born 1940), Finnish ice hockey player
- Kalevi Oikarainen (1936–2020), Finnish cross-country skier
- Kalevi Pakarinen (1939–1999), Finnish fencer
- Kalevi Rassa (1936–1963), Finnish ice hockey player
- Kalevi Remes (1925–1984), Finnish politician
- Kalevi Sorsa (1930–2004), Finnish politician
- Kalevi Tuominen (1927–2020), Finnish multi-sport athlete and coach
- Kalevi Vähäkylä (born 1940), Finnish biathlete
- Kalevi Viskari (1928–2018), Finnish gymnast
- Kalevi Wiik (1932–2015), Finnish linguist

== Surname ==
- Jaakko Eino Kalevi (born 1984), Finnish musician
