= Karhi =

Karhi may refer to:

- Kadhi or karhi, Indian dish
- Otto Karhi (1876–1966), Finnish politician
- Shlomo Karhi (born 1982), Israeli politician

== See also ==
- Hanna Karhinen (1878–1938), Finnish politician
- Karhunen, Finnish surname
- Korhonen, Finnish surname
