= Sinkkonen =

Sinkkonen is a Finnish surname. Notable people with the surname include:

- Yrjö Sinkkonen (1909–1972), Finnish farmer and politician
- Sauli Sinkkonen (born 1989), Finnish volleyball player
