= Virta =

- Language: Finnish

Origin
- Meaning: "river", from virta ("river, stream")
- Region of origin: Finland

Other names
- Variant form: Virtanen

Virta (also written as Wirta) is a Laine type Finnish surname (in Finnish, it means "river" or "stream"). Notable people with the surname include:

- Eemeli Virta (born 2000), Finnish footballer
- Hannu Virta (born 1963), Finnish ice hockey player
- Ilkka Juhani Virta (born 1961), Finnish historian
- Jalmari Virta (1884–1938), Finnish politician
- Marjukka Virta (born 1983), Finnish ringette player
- Nikolai Virta (1906–1976), Russian writer, Stalin Prize winner
- Olavi Virta (1915–1972), Finnish singer, "king of Finnish tango"
- Ossi Virta (born 1988), Finnish football manager and footballer
- Päivi Virta (born 1964), Finnish ice hockey player
- Patrik Virta (born 1996), Finnish ice hockey player
- Pekka Virta (born 1969), Finnish ice hockey player
- Sofia Virta (born 1990), Finnish politician
- Tony Virta (born 1972), Finnish ice hockey player
