= Korhonen =

Finnish surname

- Pronunciation: /ˈkorhonen/
- Language: Finnish

Origin
- Meaning: (uncertain, see text) and the common suffix -nen
- Region of origin: Finland

Korhonen is a surname originating in Finland, where it is the most common surname. The most common surname in Finland was Virtanen before 2009, when the number of people with the surname Korhonen exceeded the number of people with the surname Virtanen for the first time.

The word korho is not used in standard Finnish, but it and words derived from it are used in some dialects, and there are also related words both in standard Finnish and in closely related languages. In Karelian korhottoa means 'to be or move upright', 'to have one's head up high', 'to raise', 'to shake threateningly', 'to brandish', and 'to perk up one's ears', and korhota means 'to rise', 'to move up or upwards', 'to get up', 'to go up', 'to become wealthy', and 'to become rich'. Kohottaa, korottaa, and kohota are the most similar words in standard Finnish.

Korho has meant 'proud', 'rich', and 'boastful' in the southern parts of Finnish Lapland, and in Satakunta and Pirkanmaa it has meant 'large man'. In some dialects it has meant 'hearing-impaired', and it seems that this meaning was most likely derived from the 'to perk up one's ears' sense of korhottaa. In some places it has meant 'slightly stupid', 'inattentive', and 'clumsy': it appears likely that these meanings were derived from the 'hearing-impaired' sense. Dialectal nouns derived from korho are, for example, korhopää from Pöytyä meaning roughly 'one with a head of upright hair', and korholaiho from Ylistaro meaning 'a crop of cereal growing upright'.

The name originates from eastern Finland and is much older than its closest competitor for the title of the most common Finnish surname, Virtanen.

== People with the surname ==
- Aki Korhonen (born 1969), Finnish ice hockey player
- Aku Korhonen (1892−1960), Finnish actor
- Anna Korhonen, Finnish computer scientist
- Anna-Reeta Korhonen (1809–1893), Finnish poet
- Cassandra Korhonen (born 1998), Swedish footballer
- Emilia Korhonen (born 1995), Finnish squash player
- Erkki Korhonen (born 1956), Finnish director of opera, pianist
- Gunnar Korhonen (1918–2001), Finnish politician
- Janne Korhonen, multiple people
- Joni Korhonen (born 1987), footballer
- Jorma Korhonen (born 1968), Finnish judoka
- Juha Korhonen, Finnish media entrepreneur
- Kaisa Korhonen (1941–2024), Finnish theatre director, actor, singer and dramaturge
- Kalle Korhonen (1878–1938), Finnish politician
- Kari Korhonen (born 1973), Finnish cartoonist
- Kari Korhonen (biologist) (born 1943), Finnish plant pathologist
- Keijo Korhonen, multiple people
- Klaus Korhonen, Finnish ambassador
- Lasse Korhonen (born 1984), Finnish ice hockey player
- Marko Korhonen (born 1969), Finnish judoka
- Markus Korhonen (born 1975), Finnish ice hockey player
- Martti Korhonen (born 1953), Finnish member of parliament
- Mikko Korhonen (born 1980), golfer
- Paavo Korhonen (1928–2019), Finnish Nordic combined skier
- Pekka Korhonen (born 1955), Finnish political scientist and professor
- Pentti Korhonen (born 1951), Finnish motorcycle racer
- Rachna Korhonen, American diplomat
- Rasmus Korhonen (born 2002), Finnish ice hockey goaltender
- Riku Korhonen (born 1972), Finnish writer
- Riku Korhonen (gymnast) (1883–1932)
- Risto Korhonen (born 1986), Finnish ice hockey player
- Roope Korhonen (born 1998), Finnish rally driver
- Timo Korhonen (born 1964), Finnish classical guitarist
- Tina Korhonen, British photographer
- Unto Korhonen (1931–2020), Finnish diplomat
- Urho Korhonen (1907–1971), Finnish gymnast
- Urpo Korhonen (1923–2009), Finnish cross-country skier
- Ville Korhonen, multiple people
- Wäinö Korhonen (1926–2018), Finnish modern pentathlete and épée fencer

== See also ==
- 2988 Korhonen, minor planet
