= Unto =

Unto may refer to:

- Unto (name)
- Unto a Good Land (Swedish: Invandrarna) is a novel by Vilhelm Moberg from 1952
- Unto Ashes, musical ensemble based in New York City incorporating madrigal, folk, New Age music and Dark Wave
- UNTSO, sometimes shortened as UNTO, United Nations Truce Supervision Organization.
- Unto the Fourth Generation, fantasy short story by Isaac Asimov
- Unto The King (album), Christian music album
- Unto the Sons, 1992 book by Gay Talese
- Unto the Third Generation, 1913 American short silent romantic drama
- Unto the Weak, 1914 American silent short drama film
- Unto These Hills, outdoor historical drama staged annually in Cherokee, North Carolina
- Unto This Last, essay on economy by John Ruskin
