= Hannele =

Hannele may refer to:

- Hannele (name), a Finnish female given name
- The Assumption of Hannele, also known simply as Hannele, an 1893 play by Gerhart Hauptmann
