= Mike Peltola =

Finnish former footballer (born 1974)

Personal information
- Date of birth: 10 September 1974 (age 52)
- Place of birth: Kokkola, Finland
- Height: 1.83 m (6 ft 0 in)
- Position: Defender

Youth career
- 1985–1989: KPS
- 1990–1991: KPV

Senior career*
Years	Team	Apps	(Gls)
1989	KPS	1	(0)
1992–1994	FC Oulu	67	(1)
1995–1996	VPS	23	(1)
1996	→ GBK (loan)	2	(0)
1996	Kalmar	2	(0)
1997–2000	VPS	96	(2)
2001–2003	Bodø/Glimt	29	(0)
2003–2004	HJK	28	(1)
2005–2006	AC Oulu	41	(4)

International career
1990	Finland U15	10	(0)
1991	Finland U16	8	(0)
1992–1993	Finland U18	14	(0)
- * Club domestic league appearances and goals

Mike Peltola (born 10 September 1974) is a Finnish former professional footballer who played as a defender, mainly operating as a left back.

== Career ==
Peltola retired after the 2006 Ykkönen season with AC Oulu, in which he captained the club to win the promotion to Veikkausliiga. In total, Peltola made 167 appearances in Veikkausliiga for FC Oulu, VPS and HJK Helsinki. He also played in the Swedish second-tier for Kalmar FF and in the Norwegian top-tier for Bodø/Glimt. In the 2003 Veikkausliiga season with HJK, they won the Finnish championship title and the Finnish Cup title.

During his playing career, Peltola studied in a business school, and has later worked in the finance sector for Handelsbanken and S-Bank.

He has also coached in the HJK youth sector.

== Personal life ==
His two sons are also footballers. Asla is a professional player in Finland and Miska plays at an amateur level.

== Career statistics ==
Appearances and goals by club, season and competition
Club	Season	League			Europe		Total	
Club	Season	Division	Apps	Goals	Apps	Goals	Apps	Goals
KPS	1989	Kakkonen	1	0	–		1	0
FC 1991	1992	Ykkönen	17	0	–		17	0
FC Oulu	1993	Ykkönen	26	0	–		26	0
FC Oulu	1994	Veikkausliiga	24	1	–		24	1
FC Oulu	Total		50	1	0	0	50	1
VPS	1995	Veikkausliiga	15	0	–		15	0
VPS	1996	Veikkausliiga	10	1	–		10	1
VPS	Total		25	1	0	0	25	1
GBK Kokkola (loan)	1996	Ykkönen	2	0	–		2	0
Kalmar	1996	Swedish Division 1	2	0	–		2	0
VPS	1997	Veikkausliiga	26	0	–		26	0
VPS	1998	Veikkausliiga	26	1	4 (Note: Appearances in UEFA Cup)	0	30	1
VPS	1999	Veikkausliiga	16	0	–		16	0
VPS	2000	Veikkausliiga	28	1	–		28	1
VPS	Total		96	2	4	0	100	2
Bodø/Glimt	2001	Tippeligaen	19	0	–		19	0
Bodø/Glimt	2002	Tippeligaen	10	0	–		10	0
Bodø/Glimt	2003	Tippeligaen	0	0	–		0	0
Bodø/Glimt	Total		29	0	0	0	29	0
HJK Helsinki	2003	Veikkausliiga	8	0	4 (Note: Appearances in UEFA Champions League)	0	12	0
HJK Helsinki	2004	Veikkausliiga	16	1	1	0	17	1
HJK Helsinki	Total		24	1	5	0	29	1
AC Oulu	2005	Ykkönen	19	2	–		19	2
AC Oulu	2006	Ykkönen	22	2	–		22	2
AC Oulu	Total		41	4	0	0	41	4
Career total			287	9	9	0	296	9

== Honours ==
AC Oulu

- Ykkönen runner-up: 2006

HJK

- Veikkausliiga: 2003
- Finnish Cup: 2003

VPS

- Veikkausliiga runner-up: 1997, 1998
- Finnish League Cup: 1999, 2000

Individual

- Veikkausliiga Defender of the Year: 1998
