= Finnish name =

In Finland, a person must have a surname and at least one given name with up to four given names permitted. Surnames are inherited either patrilineally or matrilineally, while given names are usually chosen by a person's parents. Finnish names come from a variety of dissimilar traditions that were consolidated only in the early 20th century. The first national act on names came into force in 1921, and it made surnames mandatory. Between 1930 and 1985, the Western Finnish tradition whereby a married woman took her husband's surname was mandatory. Previously in Eastern Finland, this was not necessarily the case. On 1 January 2019, the reformed Act on Forenames and Surnames came into force.

Finnish given names are often of Christian origin (e.g., Jukka from Greek Johannes), but Finnish and Swedish origins are also common.

== Pronunciation ==
In Finnish, the letter "j" denotes the approximant [j], as in English you. For example, the two different names Maria and Marja are pronounced nearly identically. The letter "y" denotes the vowel [y], not found in most dialects of English, but similar to German "ü" and French "u". "R" is rolled. The stress is always on the first syllable in Finnish. For example, Yrjö Kääriäinen is pronounced [ˈyrjø ˈkæːriæi̯nen]. Double letters always stand for a geminate or longer sound (e.g., Marjaana has a stressed short [ɑ] followed by an unstressed long [ɑː] and then another unstressed short [ɑ]). As per Finnish phonotactics, both Finnish first names and surnames usually end in vowels, and always in either a vowel or a coronal consonant. This occurs regardless of gender, and surnames are no longer marked by gender.

Pronunciation of Swedish names is similar, but long vowels are not doubled and the stress may be on any syllable. Finland has a long bilingual history and it is not unusual for Finnish speakers to have Swedish surnames or given names. Such names may be pronounced according to Finland–Swedish phonology or, depending on the person named, the person speaking and the language used, a Fennicized variant. For instance, Kronberg may be pronounced as [ˈkru:nˌbæri] ("CROON-BARry"), [ˈkronˌberk] ("KRONN-berk"), or something between the two.

When writing Finnish names without the Finnish alphabet available (such as in e-mail addresses), the letters "ä" and "ö" are usually replaced with "a" and "o", respectively (e.g., Pääkkönen as Paakkonen). This is not the same, but visually recognizable.

== Surnames ==
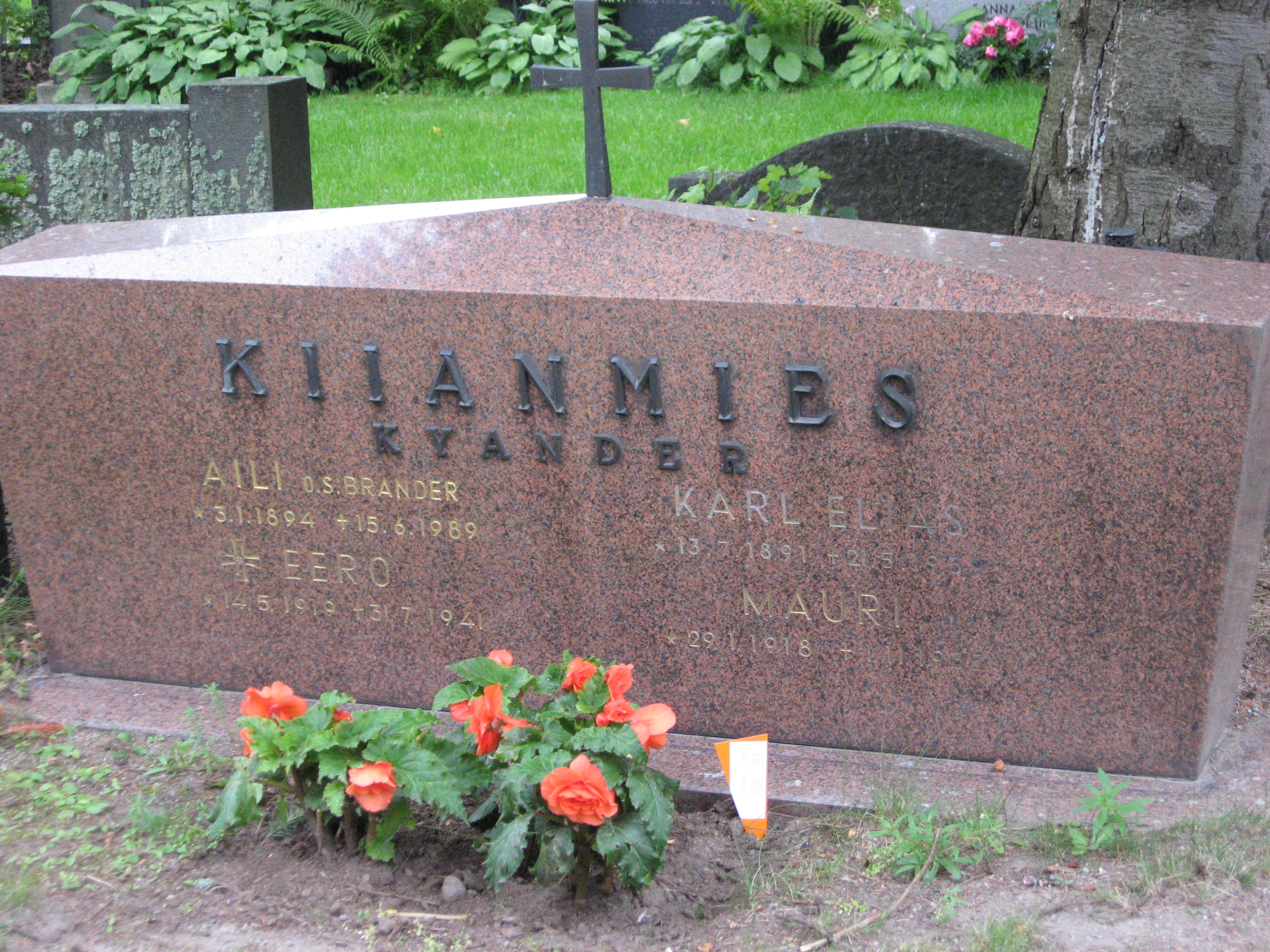
A set of graves in Tampere, showing the Swedish surname Kyander as well as the Finnicized Kiianmies.

Finland has three predominant surname traditions: the West Finnish, the East Finnish and that of the Swedish nobility, clergy, bourgeoisie and military. Until the early 20th century, Finland was a predominantly agrarian society and the names of West Finns were based on their association with a particular area, farm, or homestead (e.g. Jaakko Jussila 'Jaakko from the place of Jussi'). Farm names typically had the suffix -la, -lä, i.e. "(place) of", and could refer to the husband (like Jussila) or describe the location (e.g. Isoaho 'large clearing'). This name could change every time the person moved to a different farm. Multiple names could be recorded in documents, such that for example Pentti Jussila l. Penttilä would be a person named Pentti who had moved from Jussila farm to Penttilä farm. Also, even if one had a surname, one would still be better known by the farm name. Farm names, patronyms and village names could be used to disambiguate between different people, but they were not true inherited surnames. For example, in Aleksis Kivi's novel Seven Brothers (1870) the character Juhani was officially summoned as Juhani Juhanin-poika Jukola, Toukolan kylästä, in English 'Juhani, son of Juhani, from Jukola farm, Toukola village'.

On the other hand, the East Finnish surname tradition dates back to the 13th century. There, the Savonians pursued slash-and-burn agriculture which necessitated moving several times during a person's lifetime. This in turn required the families to have surnames, which were in wide use among the common folk as early as the 13th century. By the mid-16th century, the East Finnish surnames had become hereditary. Typically, the oldest East Finnish surnames were formed from the first names of the patriarchs of the families (e.g. Ikävalko, Termonen, Pentikäinen). In the 16th, 17th and 18th centuries, new names were most often formed by adding the place name of the former or current place of residence (e.g., Puumalainen < "of Puumala").

In the East Finnish tradition, women carried the family name of their fathers in feminine form indicated by the -tar/-tär suffix (e.g.Karhunen ~ Karhutar < Karhusen tytär ("Karhunen's daughter")). By the 19th century, this practice fell into disuse due to the influence of Western European surname tradition. Also, women did not change their surnames with marriage.

In 1921, surnames became compulsory for all Finns. At this point, if there was no surname, the homestead names were usually adopted as surnames. Because the inhabitants often included farmhands and other non-family member, holders of the same surname are not necessarily genetically related. A typical feature of such names is the addition of prefixes Ala- or Ali- ('Lower') and Ylä- or Yli- ('Upper'), giving the location of the holding along a waterway in relation to the main holding (e.g. Yli-Ojanperä, Ala-Verronen). In Pohjanmaa, there are similar prefixes Rinta- and Latva- ('downstream' and 'upstream' respectively).

Common suffixes are -nen (in oblique form -se-; e.g., Miettinen : Miettisen "Miettinen's"). Initially it was a diminutive suffix usually meaning "small", "junior", and -la/-lä, a locative suffix usually meaning "(place) of". The -nen suffix was freely interchanged with -son or -poika as late as the 16th century, but its meaning was ambiguous as it could refer not only to a "son", but any member of a patriarch's family, a farm or even a place. For example, the surname Tuomonen could mean "Son of Tuomo" or "Farm of Tuomo" or something else belonging to Tuomo. Over time the suffix '-nen' lost its original meaning and became a generic surname-deriving suffix for surnames of so-called Virtanen type, see examples below.

A third tradition of surnames was introduced into Finland by the Swedish-speaking upper and middle classes which used typical German and Swedish surnames. By custom, all Finnish-speaking people who were able to get a position of some status in urban or learned society, discarded their Finnish name, adopting a Swedish, German or (in case of clergy) a Latin surname. In the case of enlisted soldiers, the new name was given regardless of the wishes of the individual. The oldest noble surnames of Swedish origin were not original, but were derived from the charges in the coat of arms, sigil and flag of the family, for example with Svärd (Swedish: "sword"), Kurki/Kurck (Finnish: "crane") and Kirves (Finnish: "axe"). Families of German origin would use the von prefix (e.g. von Wright).

In the late 19th and early 20th century, the overall modernization process and especially, the political movement of Fennicization brought forth a movement towards the adoption of Finnish surnames. At that time, many people with a Swedish or otherwise foreign surname changed their family name to a Finnish one. The features of nature with endings -o/ö, -nen (Meriö < meri "sea", Nieminen < niemi "peninsula") are typical of the names of this era, as well as more or less direct translations of Swedish names (Helleranta < Hällstrand). Fennicizing one's name also concealed non-Finnish origin. For example, Martti Ahtisaari's grandfather was Adolfsen from Norway. Nevertheless, Fennicization was not mandatory and thus it is common to find entirely Finnish-speaking families with Swedish surnames; having a Swedish name does not imply one is a Swedish speaker.

An effect of industrialization was that large numbers of people moved to the cities and towns and had to adopt a surname. Missing an inherited surname, they invented theirs. Initially, these were in Swedish, and they were not very stable; people called them "superfluous names" (liikanimi), and a person could change one's surname several times during their career. Later, Finnish became the preferred language, and themes were taken from nature. Some of the most common examples of this type are Laine "wave", Vainio "cultivated field", Nurmi "grassland", and Salo "grove". When applicable, -nen or -la/-lä could be suffixed, such as in Koskinen "rapids + nen".

Sharing a surname does not imply that the two people are related. Regulation of surnames to prevent two families from sharing the same name only began with the 1921 act. Before this, multiple families could have had Fennicized or otherwise changed their surnames to the same name. For example, the Finnish name Rautavaara was adopted by persons with the former Swedish names Sirius, Rosenqvist, Backman, Järnberg, Granlund and Mattson. Similarly, the adoption of farm names as surnames by unrelated persons living on the same farm contributed to the number of these shared names.

=== Current use ===
The 10 most common surnames in Finland (March 2012)
#	Surname	Etymology	Bearers
1	Korhonen	korho "deaf" or "proud"	23,509
2	Virtanen	virta "stream"	23,374
3	Mäkinen	mäki "hill"	21,263
4	Nieminen	niemi "cape"	21,253
5	Mäkelä	mäki "hill"	19,575
6	Hämäläinen	Häme "Tavastia"	19,242
7	Laine	laine "little wave"	18,881
8	Heikkinen	Heikki < Henrik	17,935
9	Koskinen	koski "rapids"	17,924
10	Järvinen	järvi "lake"	17,040

In 21st century Finland, the use of surnames follows the German model. Every person is legally obliged to have a first and last name. A maximum of four first names are allowed (three prior to January 1, 2019). When marrying, a Finnish couple may adopt a shared surname, either one partner's surname or a combination of their surnames. They may also retain their surnames, either can take one of their spouse's surnames and either can combine their surname with that of their spouse. If they take a shared surname, that will be the surname of their children, otherwise their children can get either parent's surname or a double surname combining those of their parents. Grandparents' names can be used, based on a family's foreign name tradition. When combining double surnames, only one part of each can be used; the double surname can consist of the two individual surnames as such, or combined with a hyphen. Between 1986 and 2018, a spouse could keep their surname, take their spouse's name as a shared surname, or take their spouse's surname as a shared surname but use it in combination with their own as a hyphenated double surname, while their spouse used their original surname. If they had a shared surname, their children got that name, otherwise the surname of either parent would be chosen. (From 1929 to 1985, a wife had to take the husband's surname or a double name.) Regardless, siblings normally get the same surname.

All persons have the right to change their surname once without any specific reason. A surname that is un-Finnish, contrary to the usages of the Swedish or Finnish languages, or in use by any person resident in Finland cannot be accepted as the new name, unless valid family reasons or religious or national customs give a reason for waiving this requirement. However, persons may change their surname to any surname that has been used by their ancestors, if they can prove such a claim.

Surnames behave like regular words when forming grammatical cases. Thus, for example, the genitive of surname Mäki is Mäen, just like the regular word mäki ("hill") becomes mäen in the genitive. For given names, this is not always the case even if the name were a common word; for example, Suvi ("summer") becomes Suvin in the genitive, not Suven.

In 1985, 38% of Finns had a -nen name, 8.9% -la, 7.4% with some other derivative suffix (e.g., -io/-iö, as in Meriö, or -sto/-stö, as in Niinistö), 17.5% were other Finnish-language names, 14.8% non-Finnish (chiefly Swedish), 13.1% were compound names (e.g., Kivimäki "stone hill", Rautakoski "iron rapids"). Only 0.3% had a double-barreled name (e.g., marriage of a Forsius to Harkimo giving Forsius-Harkimo).

== Patronymics ==
Patronymics were used in official documents until the late 19th century. Finns did not address each other by patronymics in colloquial speech. The natural Finnish way of referring to someone's parentage is the genitive: Matin Olli ("Matthew's Olaf") instead of the solemn Olli Matinpoika ("Olaf Matthew's son"). When patronymics were no longer required in documents, they quickly fell out of use. They are still perfectly legal, but very rare, often representing a deliberate archaism. Unlike in Swedish, Finnish patronymics were not transferred into hereditary family names. Thus, the Finnish situation differs considerably from, for instance, Sweden, which has hundreds of thousands of Johanssons and Anderssons. The Swedish patronymic-like surnames are treated like any other surnames. Real patronymics are handled like additional first names, i.e., one must still have a surname. An exception is made for the Icelandic citizens resident in Finland, who are allowed to follow the Icelandic name tradition.

== First names ==
The native Finnish tradition of first names was lost during the early Christian period, and by the 16th century, only Christian first names were accepted. The popular names were usually the names of saints whose cult was widespread. This resulted in some differences between the Western and Eastern Finnish first names, as the names in Eastern Finland might have had forms derived from Russian or Church Slavonic, instead of Swedish and Latin. For example, there are two Finnish cognates of George, Yrjö < Swedish Örjan and Jyri < Russian Юрий (Yuri). The most important source for researching the name forms actually used by the Finns themselves in the 15th to 18th centuries are the surnames preserved in written sources, as these were often formed on the basis of a first name. The first names themselves are usually given in Swedish or Latin forms, as these are the languages used in the records. The name actually used was a Fennicized form of the name, which might have changed as the person became older. For example, a person given the Swedish name Gustaf in the parish register might be called Kustu as a child, Kusti as an adolescent, Kyösti or Köpi as an adult and Kustaa as an old man.

In the early 19th century, almost all Finnish first names were taken from the official almanac, published by the Royal Academy of Turku, later by the University of Helsinki. The names were mostly names of the saints whose cults had been popular before the Reformation, but the almanac also incorporated a number of names from the Old Testament and Swedish royalty, which were added to certain days during the 17th and 18th centuries. During the 19th century, the Finnish forms were gradually added to the Finnish almanac, while the Swedish and Latin forms were removed (the Swedish forms were retained in a separate Swedish almanac). At the same time, the vicars gradually started to use Finnish name forms in parish registers. This, in turn, cemented the Finnish name forms that were used.

Names with originally Finnish etymologies were revived in the 19th century. In the absence of reliable information about ancient names, parents chose names of mythical characters from folklore (Aino, Tapio), and many new names were created from Finnish words (Seppo "smith" or "skilled person", Ritva "birch twig"). Some clergymen initially refused to christen babies with such "pagan" names. The first given name of Finnish origin, Aino, was accepted in the almanac in 1890, followed by numerous others in 1908. About 30% of Finns born in 1910–1939 received a name with Finnish etymology.

By the 1930s, the use of Finnish names and name variants was stabilized, and most of the popular names were noted in the almanac. Since then, the almanac has been gradually changed to include new, popular names. At present, all names which have at least 1,000 bearers are incorporated into the almanac of the University of Helsinki and given a "name day" (Finnish: nimipäivä). In 2010, 792 of the 35,000 first names used in Finland were listed in the Finnish almanac. The name day calendar follows the Medieval Catholic saints' calendar when applicable.

First names are subject to changing fashions, while second or third given names are more traditional and typically trisyllabic. In the table below, both first and given names are counted. Since the digitalization of the Finnish national population database in the 1970s, the most popular names in Finland (of all Finnish residents or citizens who have lived after that point) have been listed by

Men's names	Origin	Men named	Women's names	Origin	Women named
Juhani	Saint John	332,172	Maria	Virgin Mary	355,087
Johannes	Saint John	236,343	Helena	Saint Helen	166,254
Olavi	Saint Olaf	217,861	Anneli	new variant of Anna	143,411
Antero	Saint Andrew	180,783	Johanna	Joanna, also < Johannes	142,891
Tapani	Saint Stephen	152,220	Kaarina	Saint Catherine via Swedish Karin	129,888
Kalevi	Finnish mythology	141,428	Marjatta	Finnish mythology	122,602
Tapio	Finnish mythology	134,185	Anna	Saint Anna	111,180
Matti	Saint Matthew	126,720	Liisa	Saint Elisabeth	100,555
Ilmari	Finnish mythology	109,727	Annikki	Finnish mythology	96,836
Mikael	Archangel Michael	109,315	Hannele	new loan from German <Johanna	91,516

Of the names listed, Annikki and Marjatta are etymologically related to Anna and Maria, but they are characters in the Kalevala, not used as given names before the 19th century.

=== Legal aspects ===
The Act on Forenames and Surnames (Finnish: Etu- ja sukunimilaki; Swedish: Lag om för- och efternamn) of 2017, in force since 1 January 2019, requires that all Finnish citizens and residents have at least one and at the most four given names. Persons who do not have a given name are obligated to adopt one when they are entered into the Finnish national population database. Parents of new-born children must name their child and inform the population registry within three months of the child's birth. The name may be chosen freely, but it must

- not be prone to cause offense
- not be prone to cause harm
- not be obviously unsuited as a given name
- have a form, content, and written form that conforms to the established given name practice
- be established for the same gender
- not be obviously of family name type
- when given to an underage person as their first given name, not be the same name as an alive sibling or half-sibling's first name, or of -son/-daughter form.

Exceptions may be made if five or more people of the same gender in the population register already have the name, on grounds of a connection to a foreign state in which the name conforms to the established practice of that state, religious custom, or another specific reason is deemed to apply.

A person is also free to adopt a new surname, either an entirely novel surname not in use by other persons, or one that has been in use by their recent ancestors or members of their immediate family.

== Usage ==
As in general in European culture, the surname is seen as more formal and the first names as less formal. Strangers are expected to refer to each other by their surnames and using grammar in formal plural. The use of first names indicates familiarity, and children often refer to each other only by first names. However, many workplaces have familiarity between individuals who work on the same site being assumed.

In contrast to European tradition, the use of titles such as tohtori ("Doctor") with surnames is not very common and is found only in highly formal contexts or is considered old-fashioned. The titles equivalent to Mr., Mrs. and Miss are herra, rouva and neiti, respectively. Thus, for example, in formal contexts, Matti Johannes Virtanen may be referred to as herra Virtanen or herra Matti Virtanen if several Virtanens are present. In most other contexts, simply one name, surname or first name, is used.

As in Swedish culture, politeness is often expressed by indirect address such that the use of names may even be deliberately avoided. However, formal Finnish features various titles, particularly honorifics such as vuorineuvos or ministeri.

== See also ==
- Estonian name
- Swedish name

== Bibliography ==
- Sirkka Paikkala: Se tavallinen Virtanen, SKS 959 (2004), ISBN 951-746-567-X
- Kustaa Vilkuna, Etunimet, Otava (1976), ISBN 951-1-04127-4
- Eero Kiviniemi, Suomalaisten etunimet, SKS 1103 (2006), ISBN 978-951-746-873-2
