= Karhu =

Karhu (Finnish for 'bear') may refer to:

- Karhu (beer), a Finnish beer brand
- Karhu (ship), name of the 1876 barque Lalla Rookh while under the Finnish flag, 1923/4 to 1926
- Karhu (sports brand), a Finnish sports brand
- Karhu (surname), a Finnish-language surname
- Karhu Team, a police tactical unit of the Police of Finland
- Kauhajoki Karhu Basket, a Finnish basketball team
- Karhumäki Karhu 48B, a Finnish airplane
