= Huotari =

Huotari is a Finnish surname. Notable people with the surname include:

- Anton Huotari (1881–1931), Finnish journalist and politician
- Kalevi Huotari (1924–1975), Finnish politician
- Anne Huotari (born 1959), Finnish politician
- Satu Huotari (born 1967), Finnish ice hockey player
