= Lahtinen =

Lahtinen is a Finnish-language surname of the so-called Virtanen type: lahti ("bay") + -nen (a surname suffix). Notable people with the surname include:

- Alli Lahtinen (1926–1976), Finnish politician
- Aki Lahtinen (born 1958), Finnish footballer
- Hannu Lahtinen (1960–2020), Finnish Greco-Roman style wrestler
- Hugo Lahtinen (1891–1977), Finnish athlete
- Juhani Lahtinen (1938–2018), Finnish ice hockey goalkeeper
- Laura Lahtinen (born 2003), Finnish swimmer
- Maija-Liisa Lahtinen (born 1949), Finnish museum director and criminal
- Merja Lahtinen (born 1968), Finnish cross country skier
- Mika Lahtinen (born 1985), Finnish footballer
- Olavi Lahtinen (1929–1965), Finnish footballer
- Timi Lahtinen (born 1995), Finnish ice hockey winger
- Timo Lahtinen (born 1947), Finnish ice hockey player
- Urpo Lahtinen (1931–1994), Finnish magazine publisher
- Varma Lahtinen (1894–1976), Finnish actress
- Vesa Lahtinen (born 1968), Finnish ice hockey player

== Fictional characters ==
- Yrjö Lahtinen, corporal and machine gunner who holds communist sympathies in Väinö Linna's novel and subsequent films The Unknown Soldier
