= LähiTapiola =

Finnish insurance company

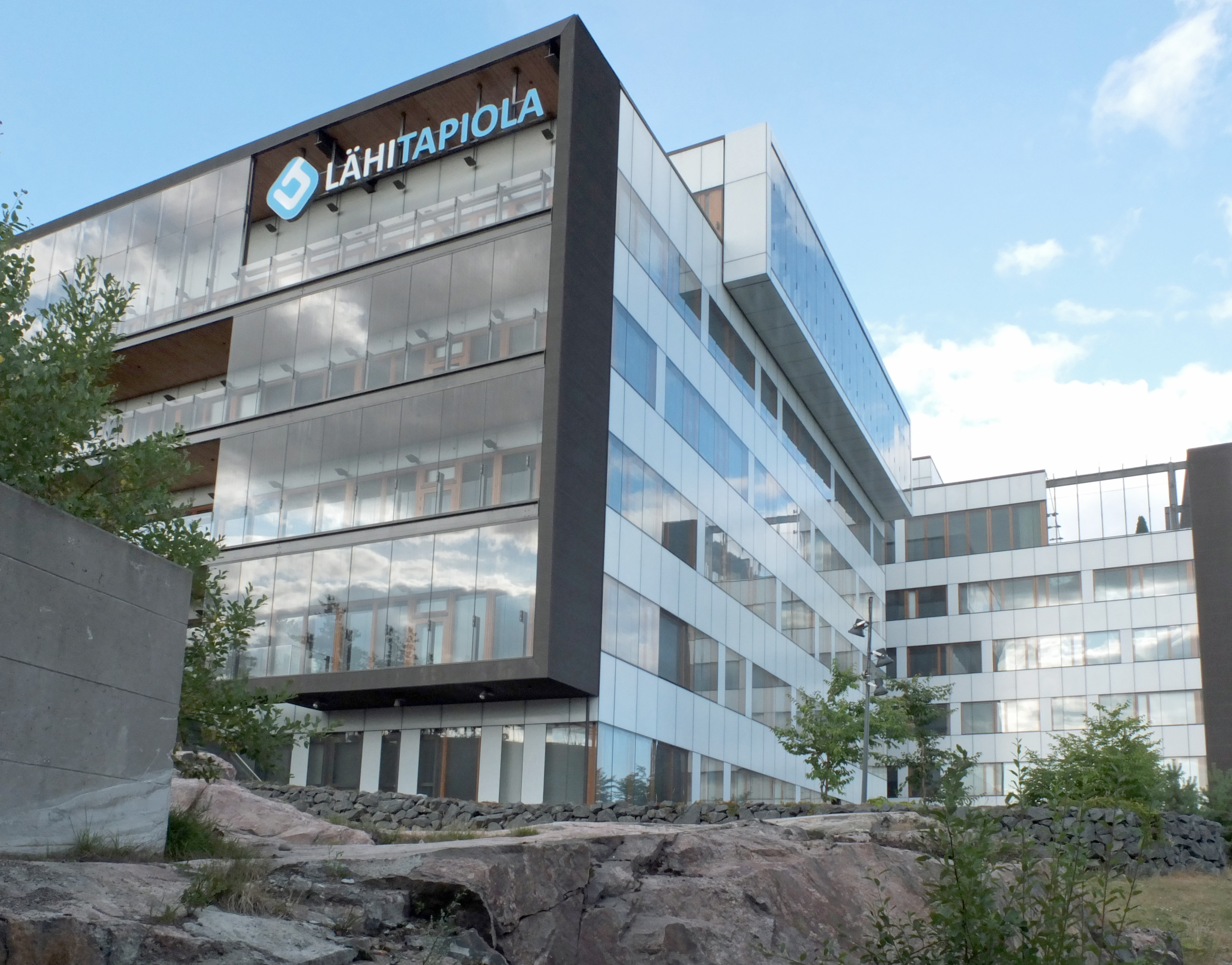
- A LähiTapiola office building in Tapiola, Espoo
- Type: Private
- Industry: Insurance
- Founded: 2013; 13 years ago
- Headquarters: Espoo, Finland
- Area served: Finland
- Revenue: ▲€1.658 billion (2024)
- Operating income: ▲€631 million (2024)
- Net income: ▲€836 million (2024)
- Number of employees: 3,800 (2025)
- Website: www.lahitapiola.fi

LähiTapiola (Swedish: LokalTapiola) is a Finnish finance group company providing insurance services, formed by the fusion of the Lähivakuutus and Tapiola companies. LähiTapiola is a group company owned by its customers, serving private, farm, entrepreneur, corporate and community clients. The company's products and services include damage, life and retirement insurance as well as investment and savings services. Services for corporate clients include services related to risk management and staff wellbeing. In 2019 the company had a business result of 273.1 million euro. In 2020 the company had almost 1.6 million owner customers and it was the largest company in Finland to provide traffic insurance, the second largest to provide damage insurance and the fourth largest to provide life insurance.

== History ==
=== Corporate background ===
The roots of the Lähivakuutus and Tapiola companies go back to the 18th and 19th centuries. The history of Lähivakuutus starts from 1770, when king Adolf Frederick of Sweden enacted a law to found fire control groups in towns. The history of Tapiola starts from 1857 when the Paloapuyhtiö group was founded. Of the direct predecessor companies of Tapiola, Pohja was founded in 1909 and Aura in 1917. After the 1933 law about mutual insurance companies several local Lähivakuutus companies were founded all over Finland.

=== Tapiola and Lähivakuutus (1928–2012) ===
Tapiola was founded on the nameday of Tapio on 18 June 1982 when the Aura and Pohja companies were merged. In 1983 Lähivakuutus was chosen as the common marketing name for the group of Lähivakuutus insurance companies, used both nationally and locally.

In the 2000s Tapiola decided to expand its activity to financial services. The company first founded Tapiola Omaisuudenhoito Oy and Tapiola-rahastoyhtiö Oy, which later merged into Tapiola Varainhoito Oy. Tapiola Pankki Oy started operation in 2004.

In 2011 the already existing plans for a fusion between Lähivakuutus and Tapiola were opened and the agreement of the fusion was signed on 23 December. In February 2012 Tapiola and Lähivakuutus announced their merger. The supervisory boards of the companies signed the foundation contract of LähiTapiola and the fusion was accepted by the corporate meetings in May 2012. In June 2012 the new marketing name was announced as LähiTapiola.

=== LähiTapiola's early years (2013–2014) ===
The LähiTapiola group officially started operation in 2013. The first CEO of LähiTapiola was Erkki Moisander. The fusion was one of the largest and arguably one of the most difficult in the economic history of Finland, as the corporate cultures of the two companies were different. The Tapiola group was a centralised, professionally led company, where the CEO at the time Asmo Kalpala had a great deal of power. The corporate culture was described as polite and including academic discussion.

On the other hand, Lähivakuutus had distributed management, where the power lay in independent insurance companies in the Finnish regions, acting in an agile and professional manner. The company led by Moisander employed a direct way of speaking. Throughout the years, there had been multiple attempts to fuse the two companies and both of them had futilely tried to merge with Fennia. The companies feared the business would turn to be led by banks, as their competitor the OP Group provided bonuses to its bank clients, which could be used in insurance payments. The fusion brought a competitive advantage in the growing competition. The birth of LähiTapiola was the responsibility of Kalpala, Moisander and the chairman of the board of Lähivakuutus, Ralf Wikström. In the negotiations, Lähivakuutus had a good position, as it did not need the fusion as much as the Tapiola Bank which had lost part of its market share. Kalpala himself was motivated by a need to go through the fusion before retiring. The board of Lähivakuutus wanted to retain the independence of its regional communities in the fusion.

In practice the fusion was equal, but it was met with much resistance to change. LähiTapiola was one of the largest damage insurance providers in Finland and had a market share of 25.6%. LähiTapiola was also the fourth largest provider of life insurance in Finland with a market share of 7.9%.

In June the Tapiola Bank changed its name to the LähiTapiola Bank. The Tapiola Bank and the S-Bank announced their fusion on 6 June 2013 as a part of a larger collaboration between the S Group and LähiTapiola. The S Group owned 75% of the new bank and LähiTapiola owned 25%. Moisander managed to form a common corporate culture by treating everyone equally and through interaction and discussions. The LähiTapiola staff learned the leadership manner of Lähivakuutus based on the balance and the profit calculation, which brought profitability and cost awareness to the company. On the other hand, Tapiola brought a great deal of new business: life insurance, banking, re-insurance and internationalisation. A culture of appreciation and understanding was formed by realising the strengths of both parties.

In 2014 LähiTapiola started a new strategic initiative involving a diverse and conversing management. In early 2014 the LähiTapiola Central Retirement Insurance Company fused with Eläke-Fennia. The new work insurance company was named Elo. In May 2014 the S-Bank and LähiTapiola merged into a new S-Bank.

=== LähiTapiola (2015–) ===
In 2016 LähiTapiola was the second largest damage insurance company with a revenue of 1.1 billion euro, of which the life insurance company had a share of 422 million euro. The company had 1.6 million owner customers. The total sum of client funds controlled by LähiTapiola was 9.7 billion euro, and its associates included the S-Bank, Elo and Pihlajalinna. LähiTapiola employed about 3,400 people.

In January 2017 LähiTapiola announced it would renew its strategy by diminishing its role as an insurance company and making life support into its core function. Life support in this case means services for safety, finance and health, for example damage and life insurance, fund control and services related to health and wellbeing. In June LähiTapiola and the healthcare company Mehiläinen announced they would start strategic cooperation.

In May 2018 LähiTapiola raised its ownership share of Mehiläinen from 9% to 20%. In October the company announced its first results from healthcare chains by the healthcare service provided by Mehiläinen. Use of remote doctors in healthcare chains of less than 500 euro provided a saving of 56 percent in costs. The company also announced it would experiment with a change in healthcare chains relating to work accidents which would encourage people to return to work when they were partially fit. After successful experience the company decided to put this model into general use. The company treated about 50 thousand work accidents per year.

After Moisander retired in late 2019 Juha Koponen was chosen as his successor, and he started as the company's directory in 2020.

In August 2020 LähiTapiola announced it would raise its ownership share of the investment fund company Seligson & Co from 40% to 100%.

== Organisation ==
The head office of LähiTapiola is located in Tapiola, Espoo. The LähiTapiola group consists of damage and life insurance companies, companies handling investments, funding and house investments, as well as 20 regional companies. In 2020 the group had about 1.6 million owner customers, about 3,400 employees and over 200 offices all over Finland.

In autumn 2020, the LähiTapiola group consisted of the following national bodies in addition to the regional companies:

- LähiTapiola Vahinkovakuutus, providing all voluntary and compulsory damage insurance
- LähiTapiola Keskinäinen Henkivakuutusyhtiö, providing life and savings insurance as well as complementary retirement insurance to private and corporate clients
- LähiTapiola Varainhoito concentrating on investments
- LähiTapiola Kiinteistövarainhoito providing services in house investments and housing direction
- LähiTapiola Rahoitus specialising in funding vehicles and machinery through automobile sales companies
- LähiTapiola Palvelut providing support and development services to other companies in the LähiTapiola group
- LähiTapiola Vaihtoehtorahastot providing alternative funds for its housing, capital, debt capital, stock and interest funds

The parent company of the LähiTapiola group is LähiTapiola Keskinäinen Vahinkoyhtiö.

The bank partner of the LähiTapiola group is the S-Bank and the retirement insurance partner is Elo.

=== LähiTapiola regional companies ===
In autumn 2021 the LähiTapiola group had regional companies in:

- Southern Finland
- South coast of Finland
- Southern Ostrobothnia
- Eastern Finland
- Southeastern Finland
- Kainuu
- Middle Finland
- Lapland
- Loimi-Tavastia
- Western Finland
- Pirkanmaa
- Ostrobothnia
- Northern Finland
- Helsinki Capital Region
- Savonia
- Savonia-Karelia
- Uusimaa
- Finland Proper
- Vellamo

LähiTapiola in Western Finland started operating in January 2021 as a merger of the former LähiTapiola regional companies in Western Finland and Satakunta.

== Ownership ==
LähiTapiola owns the investment company Seligson & Co and is one of the owners of Mehiläinen and Pihlajalinna. The LähiTapiola group also owns part of the capital of the insurance company Turva and is thus one of Turva's owners.

== Awards ==
In 2019 LähiTapiola Varainhoito was awarded best provider of responsive investments for the fifth time in seven years in a survey for institution investors conducted by SFR Research.

== Literature ==
- Itkonen, Uolevi: Tapiola-fuusio, Edita 2002, ISBN 951-98986-0-3
- Henttinen, Annastiina: Vakuuttavaa yhteistyötä – Lähivakuutusryhmän historia, Central Association of Lähivakuutus 2005, ISBN 952-91-8584-7
- Koivisto, Jukka: Tahto ratkaise, Otava 2016, depicting the difficult fusion
