= Lathi =

Lathi may refer to:

- Lathi (stick), a long, heavy bamboo stick used by Indian, Pakistani, Bangladeshi and Sri Lankan police as a baton
- Lathi charge, a police tactic used to disperse crowds
- Lathi khela, a traditional Indian and Bangladeshi martial art of stick fighting

== Geography ==
- Lathi, Gujarat, a town in India
  - Lathi State, a former princely state
  - Lathi (Vidhan Sabha constituency)

== Film ==
- Lathi (1992 film), a Telugu-language Indian film
- Lathi (1996 film), a Bengali-language Indian film
- Laththi. a 2022 Tamil-language Indian film

== See also ==
- Lahti, a city in Finland
- Lahti (surname)
