= Asla Peltola =

Finnish footballer (born 2004)

Personal information
- Date of birth: 4 June 2004 (age 22)
- Place of birth: Helsinki, Finland
- Height: 1.83 m (6 ft 0 in)
- Position: Midfielder

Team information
- Current team: Lahti (on loan from AC Oulu)
- Number: 8

Youth career
- –2021: HJK
- 2021–2022: Honka

Senior career*
Years	Team	Apps	(Gls)
2022–2023	Honka II	36	(1)
2023	Honka	0	(0)
2024–	AC Oulu	6	(0)
2024–	→ OLS (loan)	16	(2)
2025–	→ Lahti (loan)	22	(0)
- * Club domestic league appearances and goals as of 23 November 2025

Asla Peltola (born 4 June 2004) is a Finnish professional footballer who plays as a midfielder for Ykkösliiga side Lahti, on loan from AC Oulu.

== Career ==
Peltola started to play football in Oulu, when his father Mike Peltola was playing in AC Oulu. Later he went on to join HJK youth team, and Honka youth team in Espoo in 2021. He made his senior debut in the third-tier Kakkonen with the club's reserve team Honka II in 2022.

On 23 November 2023, Peltola returned to Oulu and signed a two-year deal with AC Oulu in Veikkausliiga, with an option for an additional year. During the 2024 season, he made six appearances in Veikkausliiga, but mainly featured for the reserve team OLS Oulu in third-tier Ykkönen.

On 7 February 2025, he was loaned out to FC Lahti in second-tier Ykkösliiga.

== Career statistics ==
As of 25 April 2025

Appearances and goals by club, season and competition
Club	Season	League			Cup (Note: Includes Suomen Cup)		League cup (Note: Includes Finnish League Cup and Ykkösliigacup)		Europe		Total	
Club	Season	Division	Apps	Goals	Apps	Goals	Apps	Goals	Apps	Goals	Apps	Goals
Honka Akatemia	2022	Kakkonen	16	1	–		–		–		16	1
Honka Akatemia	2023	Kakkonen	20	0	2	0	–		–		22	0
Honka Akatemia	Total		36	1	2	0	0	0	0	0	38	1
Honka	2023	Veikkausliiga	0	0	0	0	0	0	0	0	0	0
AC Oulu	2024	Veikkausliiga	6	0	2	0	5	0	–		13	0
OLS	2024	Ykkönen	16	2	–		–		–		16	2
Lahti (loan)	2025	Ykkösliiga	1	0	1	0	4	0	–		6	0
Career total			59	3	5	0	9	0	0	0	73	3
