= Karhu (surname) =

Karhu is a Finnish surname of Laine type literally meaning "bear". Notable people with the surname include:

- Minna Karhu (born 1971), Finnish freestyle skier
- Kimmo Karhu, Finnish racing cyclist
- Tero Karhu (born 1979), Finnish footballer
- Niko Karhu (born 1993), Finnish ice hockey defenceman
