= Marjatta =

Marjatta (Finnish pronunciation: [marjatːa]) is a feminine Finnish given name. Its nameday is celebrated on 15 August. It reached its peak of popularity in the 1940s and 1950s. As of 2013 there were more than 123,000 women registered with this name in Finland. It is listed by the Finnish Population Register Centre as one of the top 10 most popular female given names ever. The name Marjatta is related to Marja and first appeared in the Kalevala.

Notable people with the name include:

- Marjatta Kajosmaa (born 1938), Finnish cross country skier
- Marjatta Moulin (1926–2018), Finnish fencer
- Marjatta Raita (1944–2007), Finnish actress
- Marjatta Tapiola (born 1951), Finnish painter
- Marjatta Väänänen (1923–2020), Finnish politician
