= Karhunen =

Karhunen is a Finnish surname of Virtanen type derived from the word karhu, "bear". In the past, the surname had a feminine form, Karhutar < Karhunen tytär ("Kahunen's daughter").

Notable people with the surname include:

- Jorma Karhunen (1913–2002), Finnish WW II fighter ace
- Kari Karhunen (1915–1992), Finnish probabilist and mathematical statistician
- Esko Karhunen (1928–2016), Finnish basketball player
- Tomi Karhunen (born 1989), Finnish ice hockey goaltender

== Fictional characters ==
- Kaisa Karhutar, from the 1980 Soviet-Finnish film Borrowing Matchsticks

== See also ==
- Karhu, Laine type counterpart
