= Unto (name) =

Unto is a Finnish masculine given name. People with the name include:

- Unto Elo (born 1944), Finnish sprint canoeist
- Unto Hautalahti (1936–2019), Finnish cyclist
- Unto Korhonen (1931–2020), Finnish diplomat
- Unto Mononen (1930–1968), Finnish musician
- Unto Nevalainen (born 1935), Finnish football player
- Unto Ojonen (1909–1997), Finnish architect
- Unto Parvilahti (1907–1970), Finnish writer and photographer, Waffen-SS member
- Unto Raisa (born 1934), Finnish chess player
- Unto Valpas (1944–2016), Finnish politician
- Unto Venäläinen (born 1944), Finnish chess player
- Unto Wiitala (1925–2019), Finnish ice hockey player
