= Pentikäinen =

Pentikäinen is a Finnish surname. Notable people with the surname include:

- Eeva Anneli ("Anu") Pentikäinen known professionally as Anu Pentik (born 1942), Finnish designer and ceramicist
- Atte Pentikäinen (born 1982), Finnish ice hockey player
- Juha Pentikäinen (born 1940), Finnish professor of Religion
