= Mehiläinen =

Finnish private healthcare company

Mehiläinen (Finnish for "bee") is a concern for social and healthcare services for both public and private customers, active in Finland, Sweden, Germany and Estonia. The company's largest owner is CVC Capital Partners.

== History ==
=== 1909-1999 ===
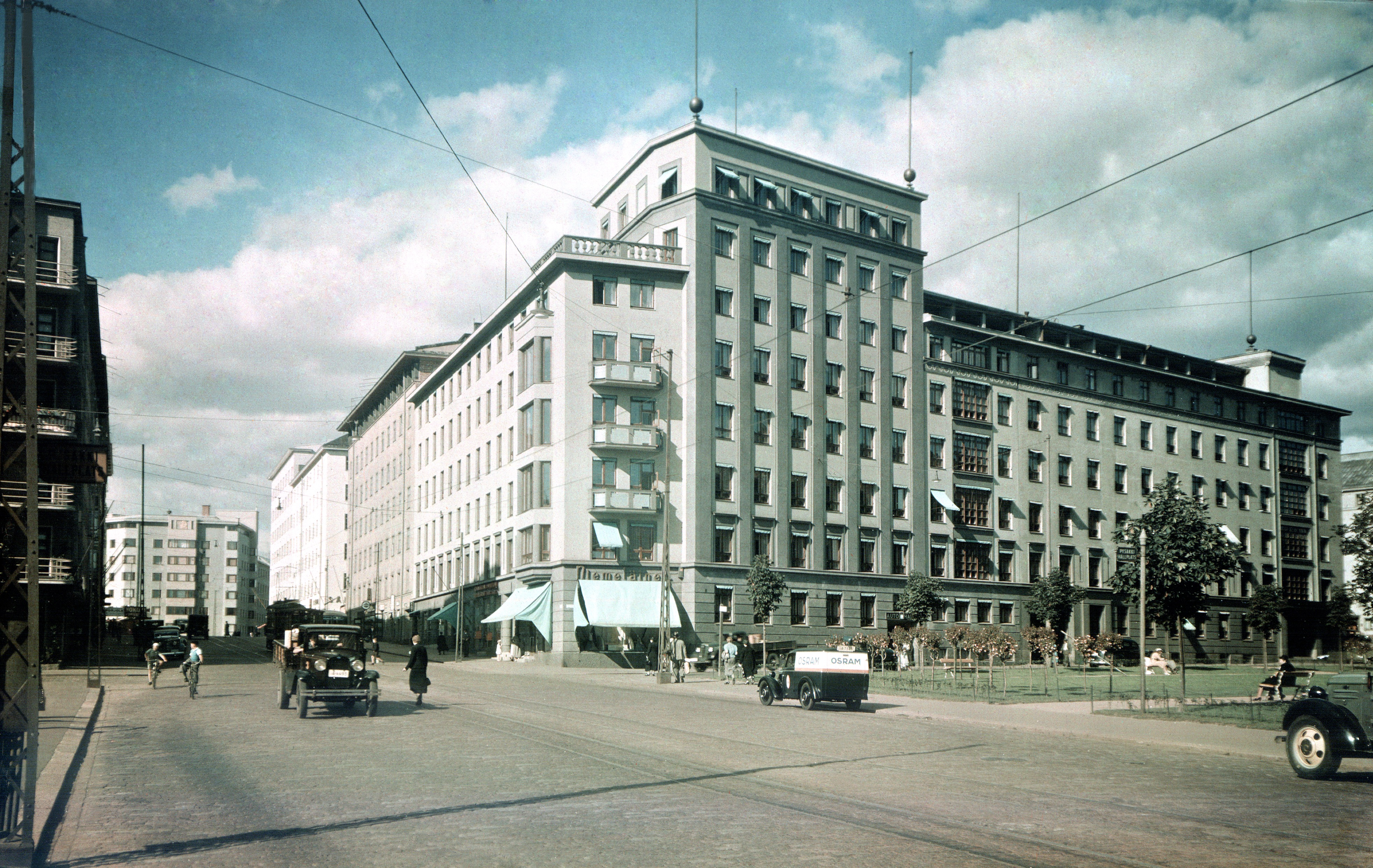
The original Mehiläinen hospital in the late 1930s.

The hospital limited company Mehiläinen was founded in Helsinki in 1909 as a small private hospital. It was founded by four Finnish-speaking doctors, Reguel Löfqvist, Akseli Koskimies, Walter Sipilä and K. F. Hirvisalo. The company was named after the mythical bee Mehiläinen in the national epic Kalevala, who healed Lemminkäinen as he was dying. The company was first located on the Huvilankatu street.

The company bought two lots from the city of Helsinki from the newly constructed area in Pohjois-Töölö, and the first part of the hospital was completed in autumn 1932 at Hesperiankatu 17. The company created rental apartments in its old premises. In 1933 the hospital was expanded to Runeberginkatu, and the third phase was completed in 1937, at which time the building right of the lots was exhausted. The hospital had 128 places for the sick and also space for newly-born babies. The last completed part also had space for apartments and businesses.

During the Winter War the hospital first served as a first aid station for the city of Helsinki, until it became a military hospital for the Finnish Red Cross, later known as the Töölö Hospital. The hospital also served as a military hospital during the Continuation War. During the bombing of Helsinki in February 1944 the hospital was damaged and was forced to shut down almost all activities for a while.

Group services by special doctors were started in 1957.

In 1964 the city of Espoo rented 34 bed places from Mehiläinen.

In 1974 the company started offering work healthcare services. The company was renamed Sairaalaosakeyhtiö Mehiläinen in 1978.

The childbirth department of Mehiläinen was discontinued in June 1980. In 1984 the company bought the Hakaniemi medical station and its daughter company, the Kielotie medical station in Vantaa. The deal also included the Forum medical station, which only started activities in 1986.

Mehiläinen renovated its concern structure from 1994 to 1995. The Kalevankatu medical station was fused to the parent company and the Forum medical station into the Hakaniemi medical station. The Mehiläinen hospital had 90 places for the sick, a laboratory and a surgical operation room. The hospital served about 130 thousand patients per year.

=== 2000-2010 ===
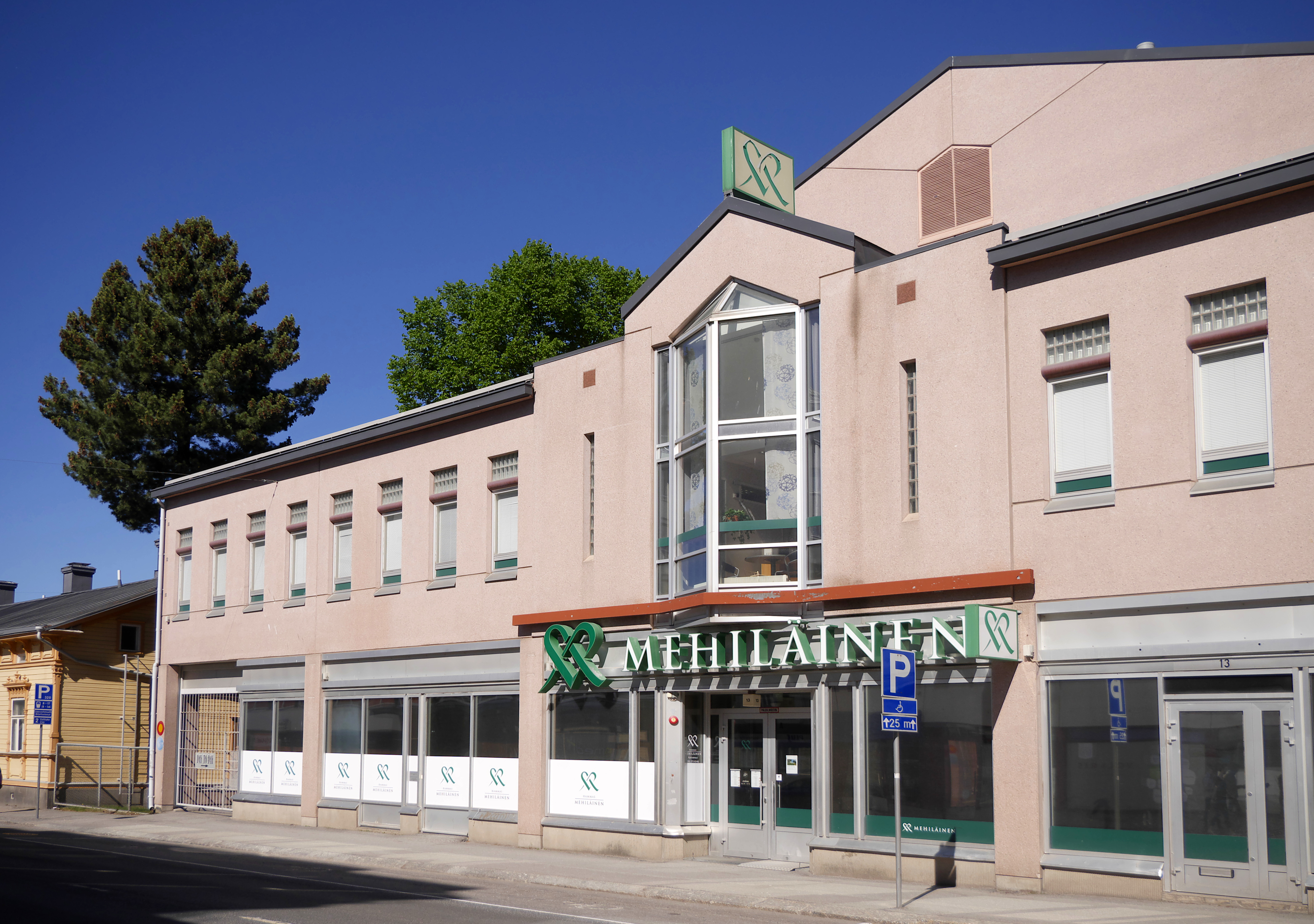
A Mehiläinen hospital in Vaasa in 2018.

CapMan and SITRA became Mehiläinen's major owners in 2000. In the next year, the Mehiläinen Hospital Limited Company and Tohtoritalo fused into Mehiläinen Oy. Tohtoritalo had been founded in 1996 as a merger between Meditori and the Vagus medical station. In 2002 the company acquired Remedi from Vaasa and Säveri from Kuopio. In the next year the company acquired a further nine companies.

In 2006 CapMan and SITRA sold the majority of Mehiläinen's shares to the Swedish investor company 3i and Mehiläinen became part of the Swedish Ambea concern. In 2007 Carema Hoivapalvelut Oy, the Finnish daughter company of Carema, the Swedish daughter company of the Ambea concern, was acquired by Mehiläinen. In 2009, the company started offering healthcare and home care services in Karis with the Carema name. Mehiläinen started offering services for child protection and mental health rehabilitation through the Leivoyhtiöt company.

In 2010 KKR and Swedish company Triton AB became the major owners of Mehiläinen.

=== 2011- ===
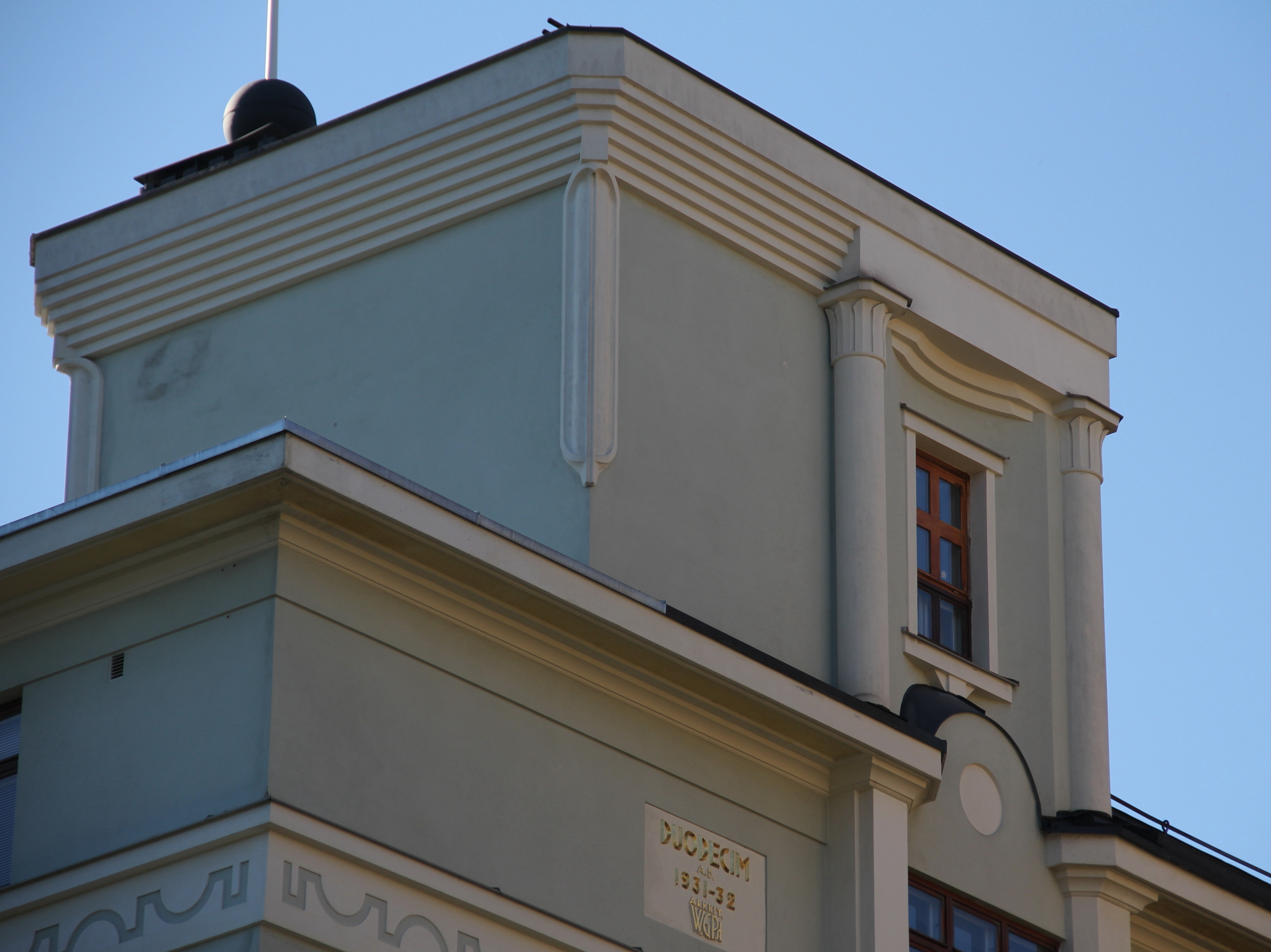
The corner tower of the Duodecim hospital owned by Mehiläinen. The building, designed by Wäinö Palmqvist, represents classicist architecture and was built on Pohjoinen Hesperiankatu in 1932.

In the 2010s, many Finnish municipalities privatised their social and healthcare services to Mehiläinen and other companies. In municipalities who had outsourced their social and healthcare services, there were many problems in reaching the promised level of services in organising both the municipality's own activity and control of outsourced services. According to the city of Kemi, half of the doctors agreed in the contract with Länsi-Pohja Oy were missing. According to Lasse Männistö, the CEO of Mehiläinen Länsi-Pohja Oy, the missing doctors were Kemi's own fault, as the premises were poor. According to Männistö, the company intends to amend the missing doctors by moving their work to nurses and by offering digital services.

Mediverkko and Mehiläinen announced their merger in November 2014. Janne-Olli Järvenpää, the founder and CEO of Mediverkko, became the CEO of the new company. Mediverkko was acquired by Mehiläinen in January 2015. At the time, the concern had a total revenue of over 360 million euro and over nine thousand employees.

In summer 2017 LähiTapiola bought a ten-percent share of Mehiläinen. Mehiläinen had a revenue of over 165 million euro, almost 30 percent more than in the previous year.

In May 2018 the funds controlled by Triton and KKR sold Mehiläinen to LähiTapiola, Varma, Ilmarinen and CVC Capital Partners. The company had over 14 thousand employees. From 2015 to 2018 Mehiläinen acquired over 40 companies. During one year Mehiläinen built over 700 new apartments for the elderly, the disabled and mental health rehabilitants. The Mehiläinen home service was active in over 150 municipalities.

In April 2019 the OP Financial Group announced it would sell the healthcare services of Pohjola Terveys to Mehiläinen, having offered workplace healthcare services to 800 customer companies with a total of almost 19 thousand employees. In November Mehiläinen announced it would acquire Pihlajalinna. At this time Mehiläinen's revenue reached one billion euro for the first time, at a total of 1064 million euro.

In 2020 Mehiläinen made its first foreign acquisition, when its daughter company BeeHealthy bought the Stockholm-based company Sibyllekliniken. BeeHealthy was separated into a separate company for new start-up activities selling Mehiläinen's digital services abroad. In September the Finnish Competition and Consumer Authority made a proposal to the market court to forbid the merger between Mehiläinen and Pihlajalinna. In late November Mehiläinen and Pihlajalinna announced that the deal had been cancelled.

In 2021 Mehiläinen acquired the Estonian workplace healthcare company Qvalitas as well as three dental care stations, of which the firstly acquired company Unimed fused with the later acquisitions of KW and Al Mare. In November Mehiläinen acquired the German company Dalberg Klinik AG.

== Organisation ==
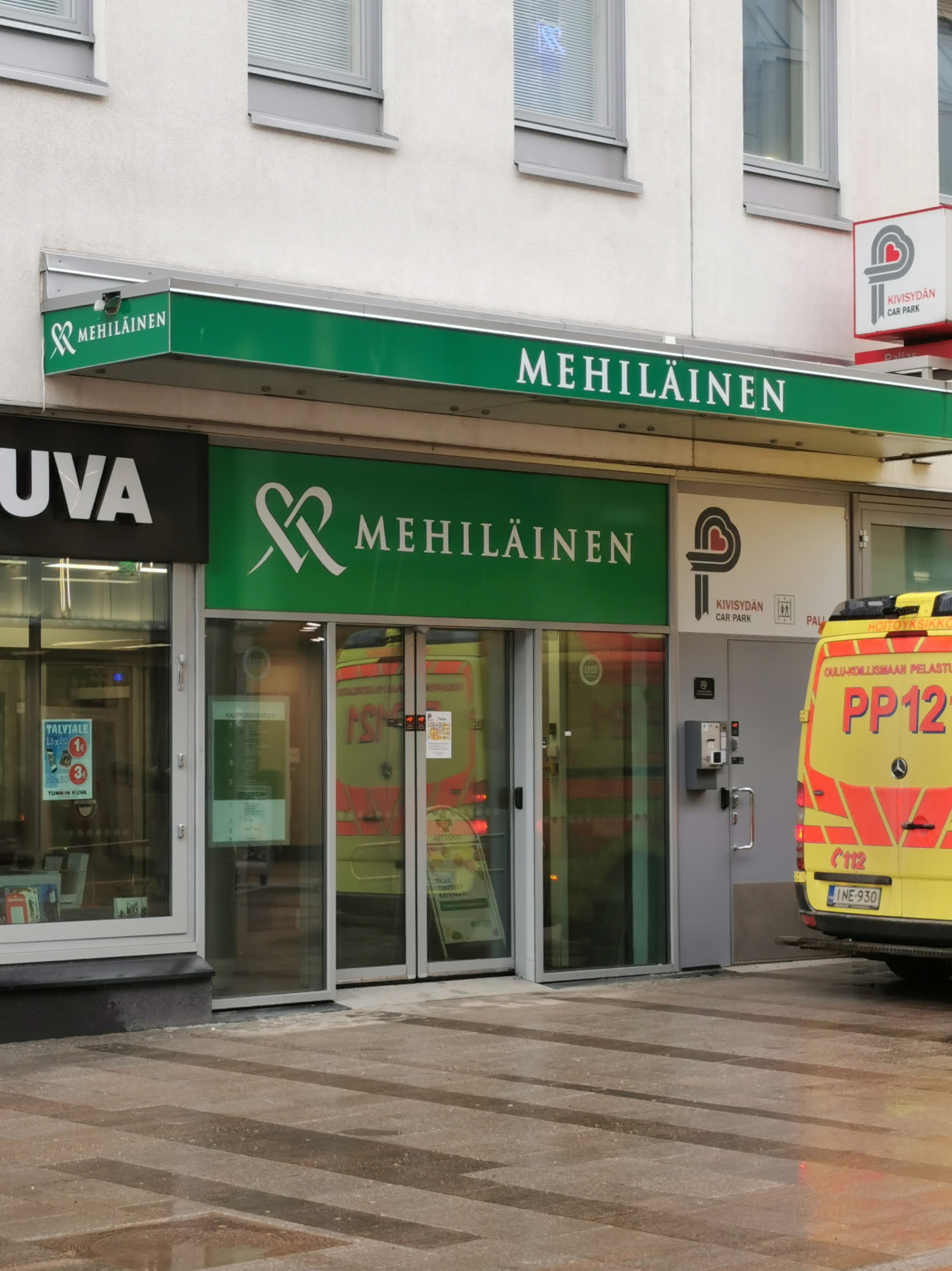
A Mehiläinen medical station in Oulu.

In 2018 Mehiläinen employed over 5400 doctors, of which about 3300 were in active practice. There were over 57 medical centres and a total of over 18,800 employees. The company had eleven hospitals all over Finland.

In 2020 healthcare services amounted to 773.2 million euro and social care services to 389.3 million euro of the total revenue. Of the revenue, 596.2 million euro came from the public sector, 306.3 million euro from corporate customers and the remaining 260.0 million euro from private customers. Mehiläinen employed about 70 software developers producing its digital services.

Mehiläinen works abroad through the BeeHealthy brand. In spring 2021 BeeHealthy had 50 employees.

=== Ownership ===
In autumn 2021 the five largest owners of Mehiläinen were the funds controlled by the Luxembourgian company CVC Capital Partners (56%), the LähiTapiola group (20%) as well as the Varma Mutual Pension Insurance Company (20%), the State Retirement Fund of Finland and the insurance company Ilmarinen.

== Products and services ==
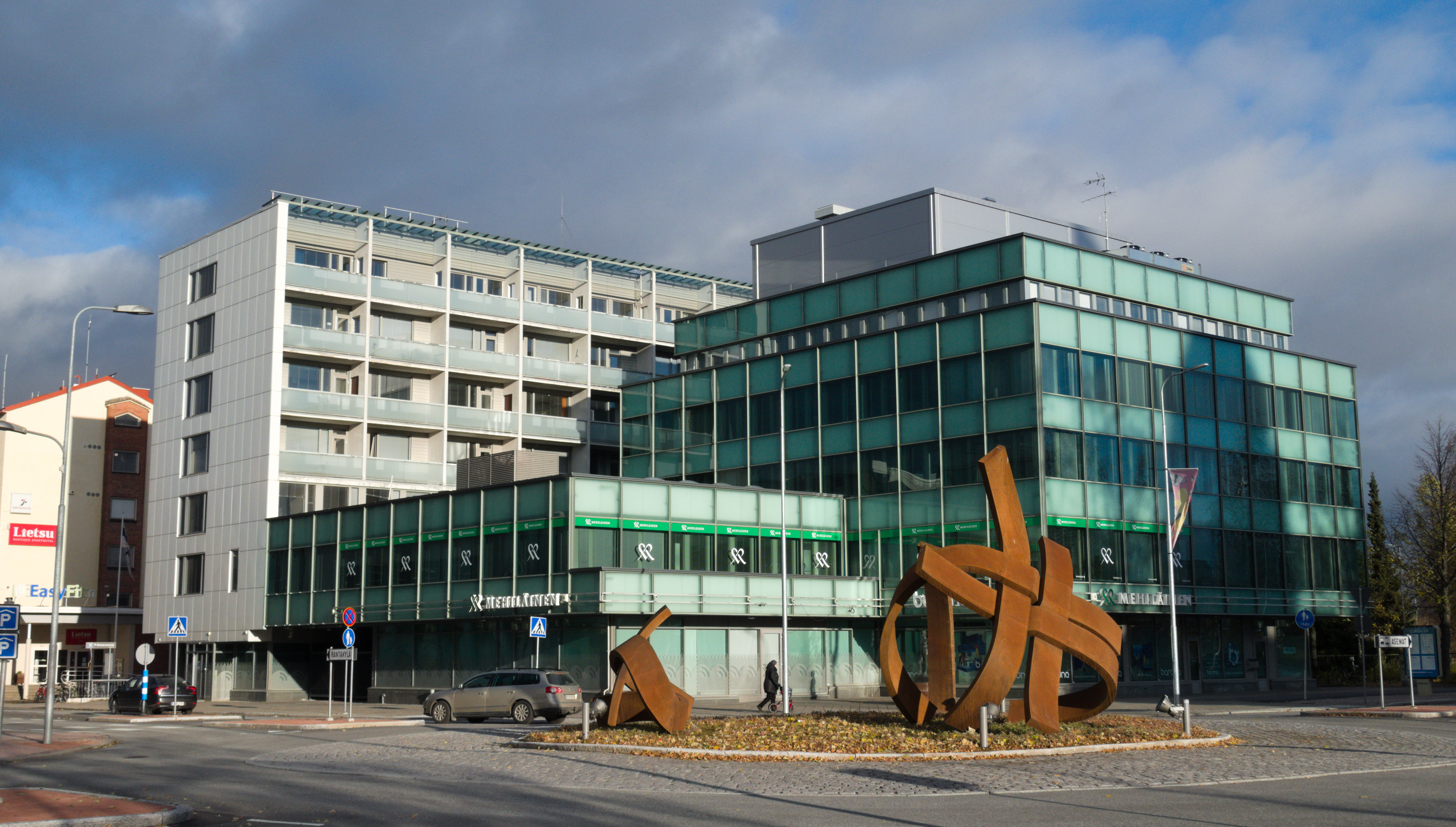
A Mehiläinen medical station in Joensuu.

The three most important business areas of Mehiläinen are private healthcare services, public healthcare services and social care services. The concern also offers mental health services.

The OmaMehiläinen service has over one million registered users. It can be used to reserve appointments, request renewal of prescriptions or view one's own healthcare records.

=== Digital clinic ===
In 2020 the Mehiläinen digital clinic had about 550 thousand patients in Finland. The service can also be used to contact a doctor remotely. The service is used in Finland and Estonia. The digital clinic allows to handle some of the patients faster than by a traditional appointment. In Finland, for example LähiTapiola, Länsi-Pohja, Siikalatva and Varkaus offer digital services provided by Mehiläinen.

=== BeeHealthy ===
Mehiläinen licences a service based on OmaMehiläinen and the digital clinic also abroad, for example in Greece and Italy. Healthcare companies and hospital chains can use the BeeHealthy service to provide digital appointment reservation, fulfilment of preliminary information forms, healthcare access, remote appointments, various kinds of remote coaching and follow-ups and access to one's own medical information such as laboratory test results. The application can be connected to mobile healthcare applications such as Apple Health. For example a diabetic can enter their own weight and sugar values into the service, after which a care team can discuss the situation with them by a telephone call or communication through the application.

== Tax responsibility ==
In 2006 the Swedish fund capital company 3i became Mehiläinen's main owner and Mehiläinen became part of the Swedish Ambea concern. The concern took an internal loan for the deal, which the Finnish daughter company could then pay off paying the interest to Sweden. As the buyer was a foreign company, the company did not have to pay real estate transfer tax to Finland. For the parent company, the interest paid by the daughter company is exempt from tax.

In 2010 the Swedish Triton AB became Mehiläinen's second main owner in addition to the American company KKR.

In 2011 the aggressive tax shelter that Triton had been practicing in the Jersey tax haven, while legal as such, attracted criticism. Mehiläinen was also accused of tax avoidance, as according to Keskisuomalainen it had taken advantage of the concern donations paid to its parent company.

According to Helsingin Sanomat Mehiläinen paid its taxes in 2015 normally based on its bottom line: the taxable income was 19.2 million euro, of which 3.8 million euro was paid in tax.

In May 2016 Mehiläinen's CEO commented on the company's reputation which had suffered because of the tax shelter and said that because of the controversy the company's activities had been completely revised. Mehiläinen had been separated from its Swedish parent company and both the CEO and the board had been replaced.

From 2017 to 2018 the Helsinki district court reviewed Mehiläinen's tax shelter from 2006 to 2012 when it had been part of the Swedish Ambea concern. Mehiläinen had abandoned the tax shelter in 2012 when its loans had been changed into capital. The Helsinki district court saw that Mehiläinen was guilty of tax evasion. Mehiläinen appealed the decision to the supreme court, but paid 13.8 million euro in tax even before the supreme court gave its verdict. Of the sum 8.8 million euro was tax and increased tax, the rest was late payment charges.

In May 2019 Finnwatch published a tax responsibility document about the social and healthcare business, where Mehiläinen was ranked worst of the six healthcare companies mentioned in the document. Of the companies investigated, it got the most points for its public tax strategy, while its points were decreased by its loan strategy to decrease its taxable income, the ongoing legal process and that part of its business income had been converted into capital income. Mehiläinen received a grade of -2 on a scale from -11 to +11. According to the report, Mehiläinen did not have an aggressive shareholder loan plan, but during the years before the report, it had been undercapitalised with loans taken from funds institutions, whose interests decrease the taxable income in Finland and the self-sufficiency grade of the company was significantly lower than the average in the business. In the 2018 corporate organisation plan the self-sufficiency grade of the concern had increased. Over half of Mehiläinen's doctors are employed as external service providers, and the company OmaPartners Oy partly owned by Mehiläinen pays work commitment shares to its shareholder doctors. In 2018 these shares had been paid for a total sum of 6.05 million euro.

In April 2020 Mehiläinen announced that the supreme court had declined its appeal and the legal process that had been ongoing for several years was at an end.

== Problems in activities ==
In 2011 the Swedish healthcare service company Carema owned by Triton received criticism about cutting expenses related to everyday healthcare services.

Because of the public controversy caused by the death of a patient in an Esperi Care nursery home in January 2019, Yle revealed that of the three largest nursery home companies in Finland, Mehiläinen had had problems related to shortages of nursery staff just as well as Esperi Care and Attendo had. The Regional State Administrative Agency had found deficiencies in Mehiläinen nursery homes, but the problems were not as severe than with the other companies Yle had investigated.

In autumn 2021 there were widespread news about problems in Mehiläinen nursery homes. The matter was bought to public attention because of the treatment of an autistic boy, but other widespread problems were found in the unit. The police started investigating the matter.
