= Lahti (surname) =

Lahti is a Finnish surname of Laine type meaning "bay" or "gulf".

- Aimo Lahti (1896–1970), Finnish weapon designer
- Aki Lahti (1931–1998), Finnish chess master
- Arto Lahti (born 1949), Finnish professor and politician
- Christine Lahti (born 1950), American actress
- Jeff Lahti (born 1956), American baseball player
- Jenny Lahti Velsek (1913–2006), American labor activist
- Marielle Lahti (born 1969), Swedish politician
- Michael Lahti (1945–2025), American politician (Michigan)
- Reinhold Lahti (1930–2002), Swedish Army major general
- Timi Lahti (born 1990), Finnish footballer
