= Eino Virtanen =

Eino Virtanen may refer to:

- Eino Virtanen (wrestler) (1908–1980), Finnish wrestler who took part in the 1936 and 1948 Olympic Games
- Eino Virtanen (footballer) (1914–?), Finnish international footballer
