= Lasse Männistö =

Finnish politician and executive

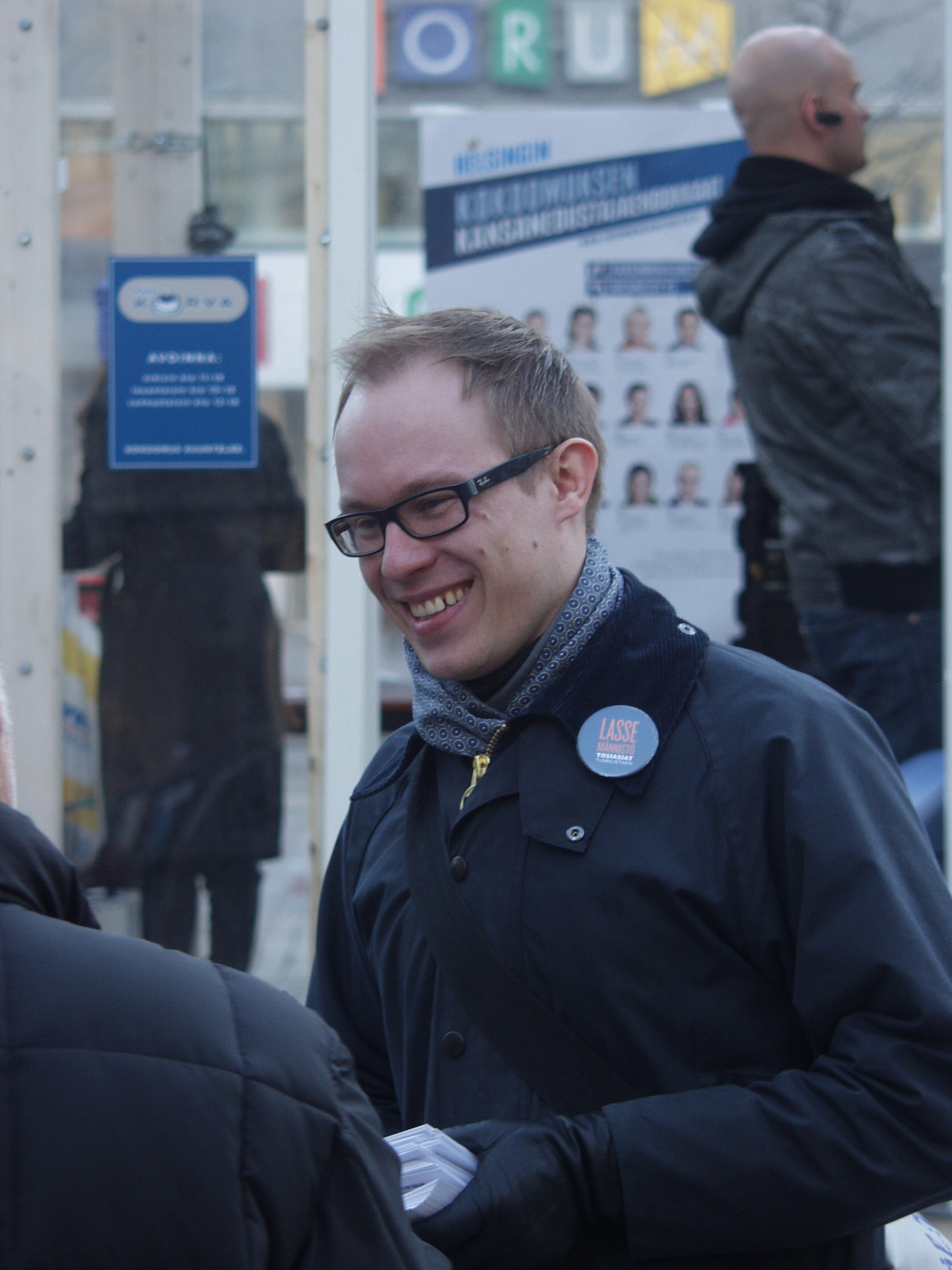
- Männistö in 2011

Member of Parliament
- In office 20 April 2011 – 21 April 2015

Member of City Council of Helsinki
- In office 1 January 2009 – 31 May 2017

Personal details
- Born: 16 March 1982 (age 44) Mikkeli, Finland
- Party: National Coalition Party
- Occupation: Executive at Mehiläinen Group

Lasse Pekka Männistö (born 16 March 1982) is a Finnish politician and an executive in charge of outsourcing and public relations at the Finnish private hospital corporate group Mehiläinen.

He has been criticized for violating the dignity of Parliament by filing for mid-term resignation to accept a position as Deputy Mayor.

== Career ==
Lasse Männistö was a Member of Parliament from 2011 to 2015 representing the National Coalition Party and elected with 4,866 votes. Additionally, he served as a member of Helsinki City Council from 2009 to 2017. In May 2015, he joined the Finnish private hospital corporate group Mehiläinen as an executive in charge of outsourcing and public relations.

== Criticism ==
Männistö was criticized in 2014 for violating the dignity of Parliament by filing for resignation mid-term to accept a substitute position as Deputy Mayor of Helsinki. For example, political science professor Matti Wiberg commented that "members of Parliament are not supposed to crumble the dignity of Parliament by trying to quit mid-term with meager cause". Männistö withdrew his resignation a day after and later labeled it a mistake. Finnish politician Laura Räty would have succeeded him as replacement Member of Parliament.

== See also ==
- Healthcare in Finland
- Politics of Finland
