= Lasse Korhonen =

Finnish ice hockey player

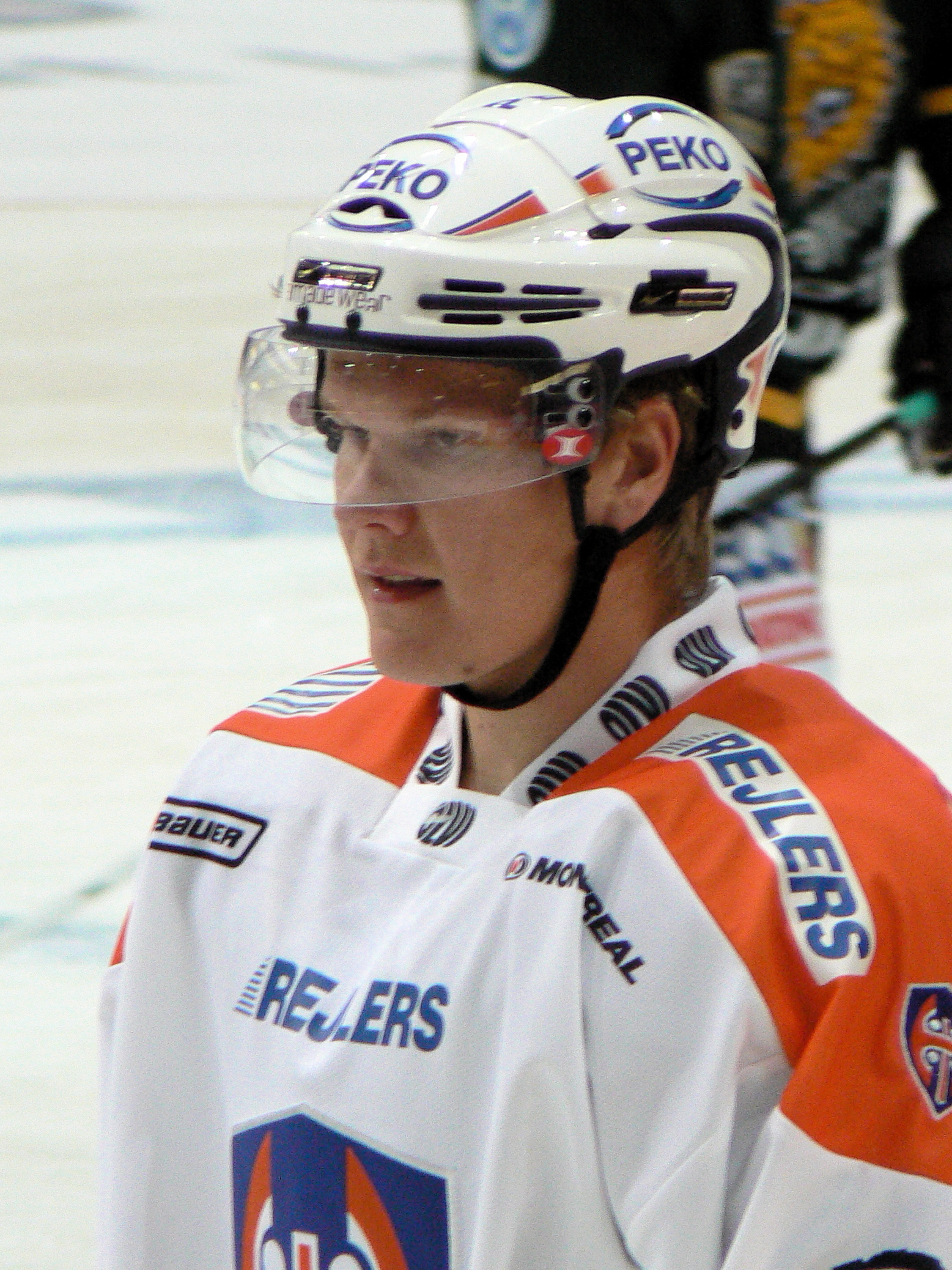
- Born: 1 April 1984 (age 41) Helsinki, Finland
- Height: 5 ft 9 in (175 cm)
- Weight: 181 lb (82 kg; 12 st 13 lb)
- Position: Defence
- Shot: Right
- Played for: Lukko; HIFK; Tappara
- NHL draft: Undrafted
- Playing career: 2004–2013

Lasse Korhonen (born 1 April 1984) is a Finnish former professional ice hockey player who played for Lukko, HIFK, and Tappara of the SM-liiga.
