= Kalevi Remes =

Finnish farmer and politician

Lauri Kalevi Remes (10 August 1925 - 18 March 1984) was a Finnish farmer and politician, born in Kiuruvesi. He was a member of the Parliament of Finland, representing the Finnish Rural Party (SMP) in 1972 and the Finnish People's Unity Party (SKYP) from 1972 to 1975.
