= S-Bank =

Finnish cooperative retail banking organization

S-Bank Plc

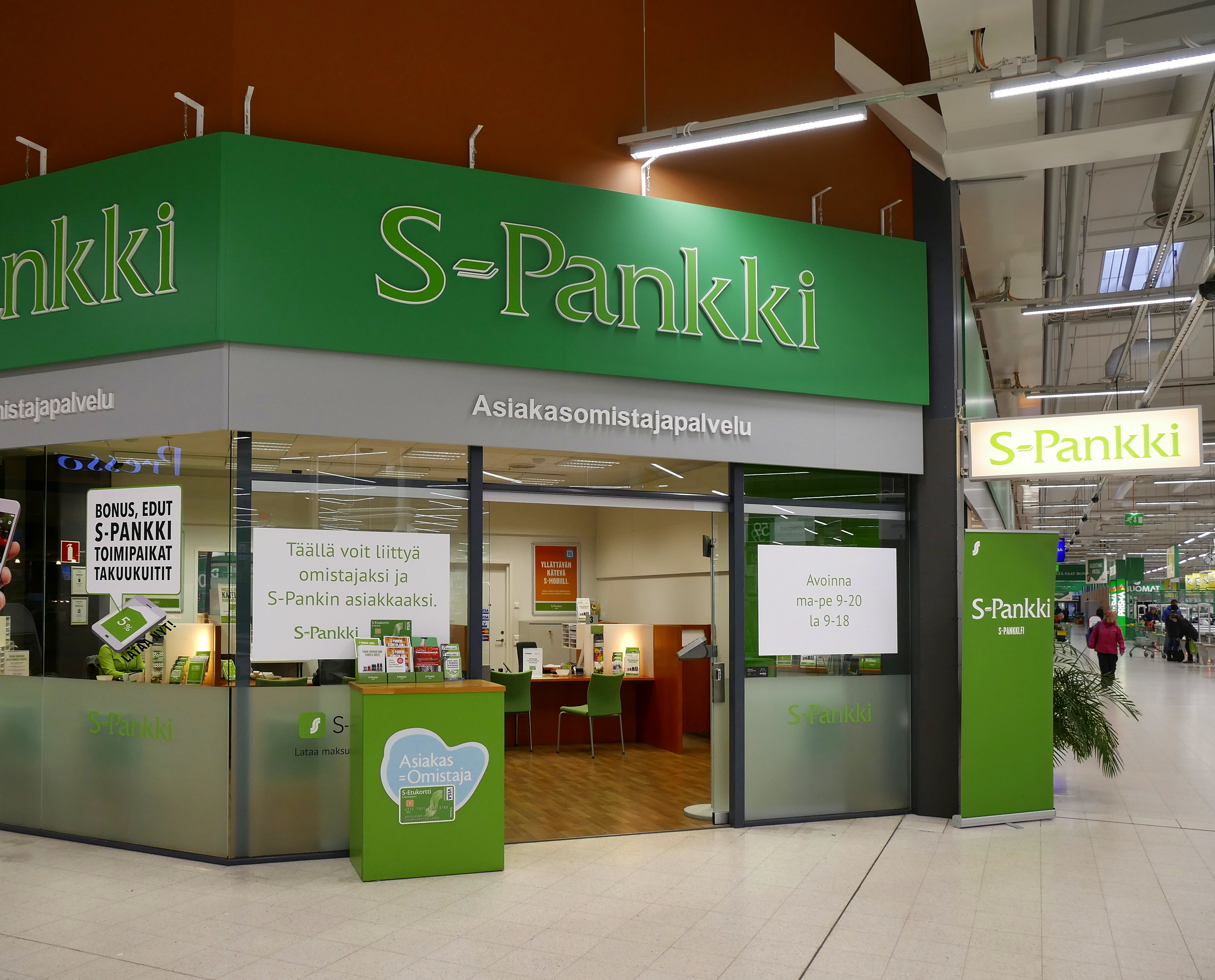
- Branch at Seinäjoki
- Company type: Private
- Industry: Financial services
- Founded: 2006
- Headquarters: Helsinki, Finland
- Products: Retail banking, Wealth management
- Number of employees: 776 (2022)
- Website: www.s-pankki.fi

S-Bank Plc (Finnish: S-Pankki Oyj, Swedish: S-Banken Abp) is a Finnish retail bank and wealth manager. It is owned by SOK Corporation and the regional co-operatives in the S-Group (Finnish: S-ryhmä), a Finnish retailing cooperative organisation.

S-Bank is the first so-called "supermarket bank" in Finland with 776 employees (2022).

At the end of 2022, the bank had around 3.2 million customers.

S-Bank has been designated as a Significant Institution since the entry into force of European Banking Supervision in late 2014, and as a consequence is directly supervised by the European Central Bank.

Pekka Ylihurula was CEO from 2006 to 2022. In April 2023, Riikka Laine‑Tolonen became CEO.

== History ==
A change to the Cooperatives Act in 2003 forced the S-Group to seek a replacement for its century-old savings fund operations. The new law prevented continuation in the previous form and set a maximum deposit limit of 3,000 euros for customer accounts. The S-Group considered both shutting down the savings funds and starting cooperation with a bank. Establishing its own bank emerged as the best option, as it enabled the continued offering of similar financial services and would support the S-Group’s other operations going forward. In 2009, S‑Bank’s ownership structure changed when the S-Group’s regional cooperatives became 50% owners through a share issue. SOK, previously the sole owner of S‑Bank, retained 50% of the shares.

In May 2013, S‑Bank announced it would acquire the investment services company FIM. Initially, S‑Bank purchased 51% of the FIM Group’s shares and the remaining 49% under agreed terms in early 2016. The acquisition expanded S‑Bank’s product range to include mutual fund saving and asset management.

In June 2013, it was announced that S‑Bank and LähiTapiola Bank would establish a new S‑Bank in 2014, of which the S-Group would own 75% and the LähiTapiola Group 25%. Following the merger, the new S‑Bank also began offering mortgages and other secured loans. On 1 May 2014, S‑Bank and LähiTapiola Bank merged into the new S‑Bank. Due to overlaps and the merger, S‑Bank held statutory co‑operation negotiations, resulting in 38 redundancies.

In May 2020, S‑Bank said it would continue investing in asset management and would acquire the asset management and real estate investment services of the insurance group Fennia.

In June 2021, the bank announced that the LähiTapiola Group would sell its S‑Bank shares to SOK and the S-Group’s regional cooperatives. At the same time, Elo would also sell its shares to the S-Group. As a result of the transaction, the LähiTapiola funds managed by FIM would transfer to Seligson & Co, owned by LähiTapiola. Thus, S‑Bank’s only remaining owners are SOK and the S-Group’s regional cooperatives.

In September 2021, S‑Bank announced it would begin rebranding. At the same time, S‑Bank said it would phase out the FIM brand and operate under the S‑Bank brand.

In May 2023, S‑Bank announced it would acquire, through a business transfer, the Finnish personal banking as well as wealth management and investment services of Svenska Handelsbanken AB. On 31 May 2023, Handelsbanken signed an agreement with S-Bank, Oma Savings Bank Plc (OmaSp) and Fennia Life Insurance Company Ltd. to sell the bank's Finnish retail banking, asset management and investment services businesses to S-Bank, its SME business to OmaSp and its life insurance business, including investment, pension and loan insurance, to Fennia. The parties expected the transaction to be completed during second half of 2024. After the closing S-Bank became the fourth largest bank in the retail housing loans and deposits in the Finnish market.

== Regulatory actions ==
In July 2014, the Non‑Discrimination Board ruled that S‑Bank had engaged in discrimination when it refused to provide online banking credentials to an Estonian living in Finland without a Finnish identity document. The bank also did not accept an Estonian passport. The Board noted that the Estonian passport is an EU‑accepted travel document and therefore should have sufficed for customer identification. The Board ordered S‑Bank, under a penalty of 5,000 euros, to change its instructions regarding the identification of foreign customers.

In December 2019, the Financial Supervisory Authority imposed an administrative penalty of 980,000 euros on S‑Bank for neglecting several obligations related to the prevention and investigation of money laundering and the financing of terrorism. The penalty related to shortcomings that occurred between 2014 and 2017. At the same time, FIM Asset Management, part of the S‑Bank Group, received a public warning. No actual money laundering was found, but the problem was poor conformance to legal "know your customer" requirements.

== Banking operations ==
S‑Bank serves customers at S-Group locations nationwide, and cash withdrawals and deposits are possible at about one thousand S-Group locations. S‑Bank focuses on digital banking services and offers, among other things, the S‑Mobile app and online banking free of charge. It provides S-Group co‑op members with the international S‑Etukortti Visa Credit/Debit card free of charge.

In December 2016, S‑Bank began offering mortgages with repayment periods of up to 45 years. Other banks generally do not grant mortgages longer than 20–25 years because of the greater risks. For example, rising interest rates or falling housing prices cause repayment problems more often than with shorter loans.

In April 2017, in an overall customer comparison conducted by Rahatieto for Taloussanomat, S‑Bank’s customer relationship was the most affordable option for mortgage‑free singles and for couples with mortgages.

In Taloustutkimus’s Brand Appreciation 2023 study, Finns rated S‑Bank the most respected banking brand. This marked S‑Bank’s sixth consecutive year as the most respected brand in the banking sector. According to the annual study by EPSI Rating, S‑Bank also has the most loyal customers in the banking and finance sector.

== See also ==
- POP Bank Group
- List of banks in the euro area
- List of banks in Finland
- List of European cooperative banks
