= Ulla Virtanen =

Finnish actress, comedian and improviser

- Born: Riihimäki, Finland
- Education: American Academy of Dramatic Arts; Upright Citizens Brigade Theatre; University of Westminster
- Occupations: Actress; comedian; improviser
- Notable work: Evek Talk show; Suorana: Virtanen; Puhtaana Käteen; Grounded Siipirikko
- Television: Suorana: Kortesmäki; ToosaTV

Ulla Virtanen is a Finnish actress, comedian and improviser.

== Career ==
In the years between 2015 and 2017 she performed with Me Naiset in the talk show Evek Talk show with Niina Lahtinen and Veera Korhonen. She also works as a professional improviser in Improvisaatioryhmä VSOP.

Virtanen worked from 2011 to 2012 as a producer and radio personality of NRJ's Aamupojat. She has been heard in YleX on Sundays in the programme Suorana: Virtanen and as a guest in other YleX and Radio NRJ programmes. Virtanen worked in the TV2 comedy show Suorana: Kortesmäki for two seasons.

Virtanen graduated from the American Academy of Dramatic Arts(AADA) in New York City and studied improvisation at the Upright Citizens Brigade Theatre in New York and Los Angeles. She has also studied television and film production for a year at University of Westminster in London.

In 2008, Virtanen performed at the Riihimäki Theater's farce Puhtaana Käteen. She was elected to the Finnish Standup Club's Revenge of the Year finals in 2011. In 2016, Ulla Virtanen played the role of pilot in the George Brant's monologue, Grounded Siipirikko (translated by Jyri Numminen).

In the popular series ToosaTV, Virtanen has performed several different roles together with Cristal Snow and NikoLa in the Ilta-Sanomat production as well as the Fox Finland television series.

From 2016 Ulla Virtanen has also worked as a columnist for the magazine Me Naiset.

== Television series ==
Year	Series	Role
2012	Suorana: Kortesmäki	comedian
2014	Kimmo	Feissari
2015	Roba	Sini Linden
2015	Downshiftaajat	Anne
2016	ToosaTV	several roles
2016	Luottomies	Ansa
2016	Evek Talk show	comedian

== Films ==
Year	Film/TV film	Role
2016	Karkkipäivä	Äiti
2016	Syli	Oona
2017	The Dissidents	Pirjo
