= Gabriel Antero =

Colombian footballer (born 1982)

Personal information
- Full name: Gabriel Antero Pinillo
- Date of birth: September 3, 1982 (age 44)
- Place of birth: Jamundí, Colombia
- Height: 1.76 m (5 ft 9 in)
- Position: Forward

Senior career*
Years	Team	Apps	(Gls)
2004–2005	Real Cartagena		
2005	América de Cali		
2006	Deportes Tolima		
2006	Deportivo Pereira		
2007	Bogotá FC		
2008	Depor Aguablanca FC		
2008	Deportivo Pasto		
2009–2010	Depor Aguablanca FC		
2010	Águila		
2012	Yaracuyanos FC		
- * Club domestic league appearances and goals

Gabriel Antero Pinillo (born September 3, 1982) is a Colombian footballer. He last played for C.D. Águila in El Salvador.
