= Ville Virtanen =

Ville Virtanen may refer to:

- Ville Virtanen (actor) (born 1961), Finnish actor, director, and screenwriter
- Ville Virtanen or Darude (born 1975), Finnish DJ and record producer
