= Niko Karhu =

Finnish ice hockey player

- Born: May 13, 1993 (age 31); Turku, Finland
- Height: 6 ft 4 in (193 cm)
- Weight: 220 lb (100 kg; 15 st 10 lb)
- Position: Defence
- Shoots: Left
- Mestis team Former teams: TUTO Hockey; TPS
- Playing career: 2012–present

Niko Karhu (born May 13, 1993) is a Finnish ice hockey defenceman. His is currently playing with TUTO Hockey in the Finnish Mestis.

Karhu made his SM-liiga debut playing with HC TPS during the 2012–13 SM-liiga season.
