= Eino Virtanen (footballer) =

Finnish footballer (born 1914)

Personal information
- Date of birth: 1 January 1914
- Position: Half-back

Senior career*
Years	Team	Apps	(Gls)
1931	Helsingin Jalkapalloklubi	3	(0)
1932	Helsingin Kullervo		
1933–1949	Helsingin Jalkapalloklubi		

International career
1936–1941	Finland	3	(0)
- * Club domestic league appearances and goals

Eino Virtanen (born 1 January 1914, date of death unknown) was a Finnish footballer. He played in three matches for the Finland national football team from 1936 to 1941. He was also part of Finland's squad for the football tournament at the 1936 Summer Olympics, but he did not play in any matches. He played mostly for Helsingin Jalkapalloklubi. In 1932 he played for Helsingin Kullervo in Finnish Workers' Sports Federation competition. For HJK he played 182 games and scored 5 goals in Mestaruussarja. He also played one season in Suomensarja and scored once.

== Honours ==
=== As a player ===
Helsingin Jalkapalloklubi

- Mestaruussarja: 1936, 1938
