= Antero Sotamaa =

Finnish sailor (born 1940)

Antero Sotamaa (born 28 April 1940) is a Finnish former sailor who competed in the 1972 Summer Olympics.
