= Yrjö Sinkkonen =

Finnish politician

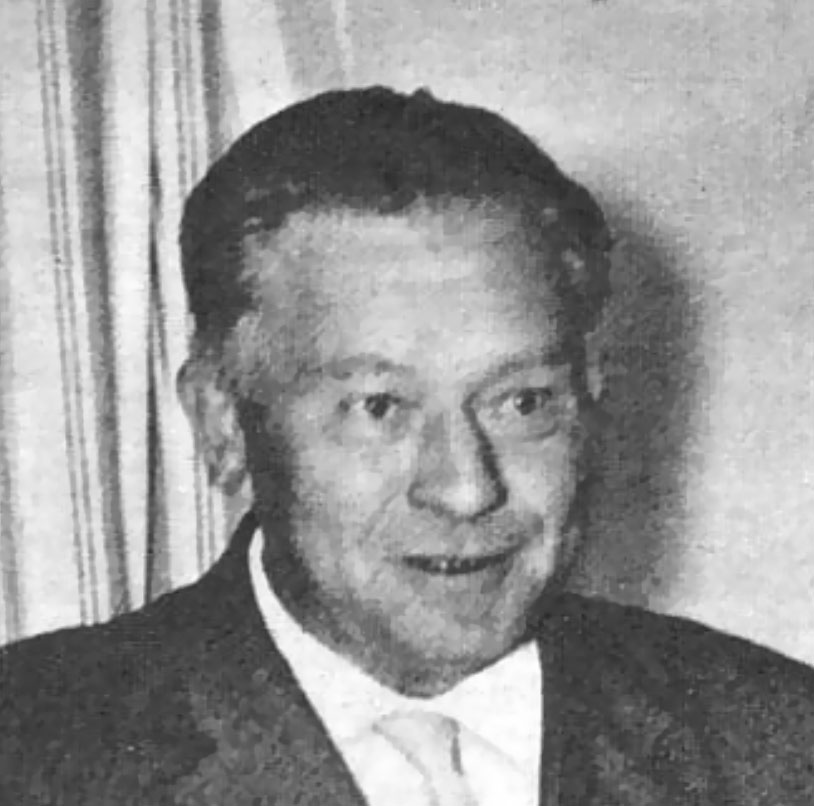
Yrjö Sinkkonen

Yrjö Sinkkonen (9 July 1909, Parikkala – 5 October 1972) was a Finnish farmer and politician. He was a Member of the Parliament of Finland from 1954 to 1962 and again from 1966 to 1972, representing the Agrarian League, which renamed itself the Centre Party in 1965.
