= Jukka Virtanen =

Jukka Virtanen is the name of:

- Jukka Virtanen (ice hockey) (born 1959), Finnish ice hockey player
- Jukka Virtanen (director) (1933–2019), Finnish film director and television host
