= Ilkka Heilä =

Finnish cartoonist

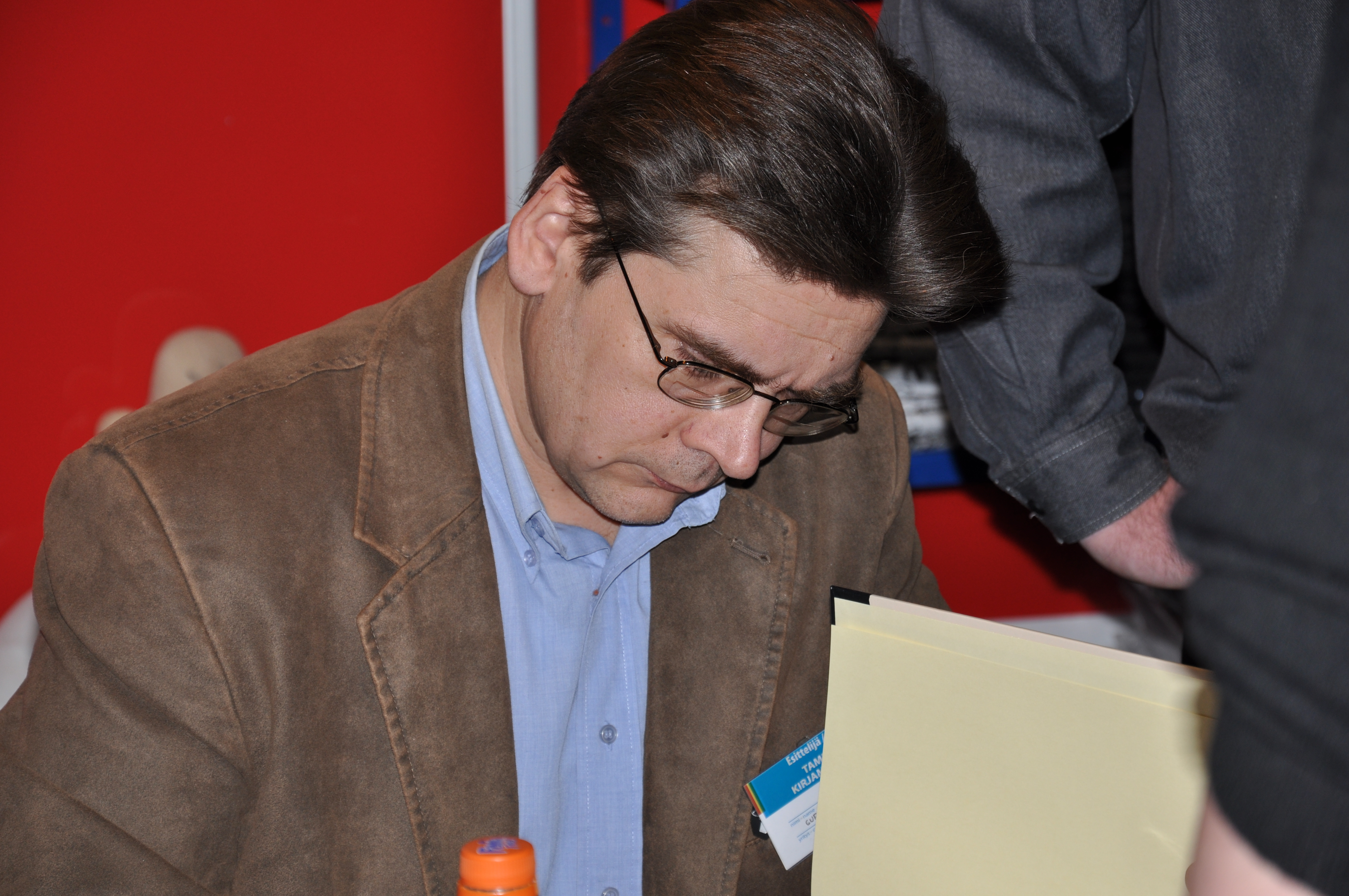
Ilkka Heilä (2009)

Ilkka Heilä (1956 in Ekenäs) is a Finnish cartoonist who lives in Kaarina. He draws B. Virtanen -comic strip. Comics by Heilä appeared as early as in the beginning of 1970s in the comic magazine Sarjis. However, working in a post office replaced professional self-fulfillment of artistic tendencies the nearly 20 years period, until then he created Bulls-syndicate of his comic strip B. Virtanen and took part in comic competition arranged by newspaper Uusi Suomi in 1989. Thanks to this comic strip, Heilä could at last in the 1990s move to a full-time comic artist. He got the Puupäähattu, a Finnish comic prize from Finnish Comics Society in year 2006.
