= Antero Leitzinger =

Antero Leitzinger (born 1962) is political historian and researcher for the Finnish Directorate of Immigration. He is the author of “Caucasus—An Unholy Alliance.” He is a history researcher on topics from Russia to Islam.

Leitzinger was born in Helsinki, Finland. The majority of his works are in Finnish.

== Bibliography ==
=== In English ===
- Caucasus and an Unholy Alliance, Leitzinger Books, 1997, ISBN 952-9752-16-4
- Kurdistan, Directorate of Immigration, 1999, ISBN 951-53-2016-X
