= Hannele Huovi =

Finnish writer (born 1949)

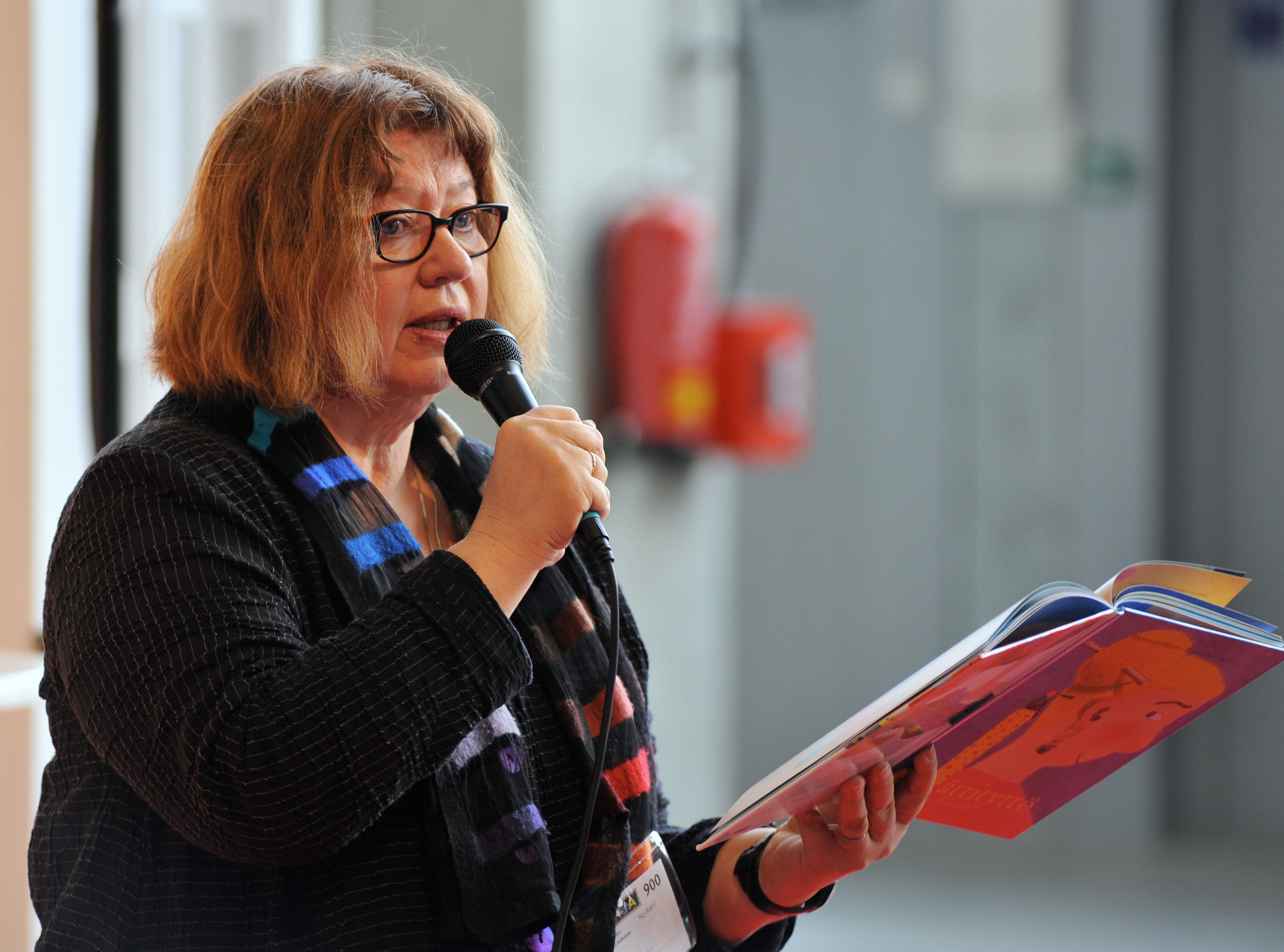
Hannele Huovi in 2011.

Päivi Marja Hannele Huovi, married name Eskola (born 19 March 1949), is a Finnish writer and recipient of the Eino Leino Prize in 2009.

She was born in the city of Kotka, and is known mostly for the books she wrote for children and teens.
