= Juha Virtanen =

Finnish ice hockey forward

- Born: October 24, 1987 (age 37) Sonkajärvi, Finland
- Height: 5 ft 11 in (180 cm)
- Weight: 183 lb (83 kg; 13 st 1 lb)
- Position: Forward
- Shot: Left
- Played for: KalPa
- Playing career: 2007–2018

Juha Virtanen (born October 24, 1987) is a Finnish former professional ice hockey forward.

Virtanen made his SM-liiga debut for KalPa during the 2006–07 season and played a total of twenty regular season games for the team over two seasons, scoring no points. In 2008, he joined Hokki of Mestis and remained with the team for four seasons before joining TUTO Hockey in 2012. He also played for Iisalmen Peli-Karhut and was their team captain during the 2016–17 Mestis season.
