= Janne Korhonen =

Janne Korhonen may refer to:

- Janne Korhonen (footballer) (born 1979), Finnish footballer
- Janne Korhonen (taekwondo) (born 1970), Finnish taekwondo practitioner
