= Virtanen type =

Type of Finnish surnames

The Virtanen type Finnish surnames are the surnames that became popular in the 19th century in western Finland and that are formed by combining of a word related to nature (but not an animal) with the suffix -nen. The name of the type was introduced by Finnish expert in naming Sirkka Paikkala after the surname Virtanen, the most common surname of this type. Until 2009 Virtanen was the most common surname in Finland, later superseded by Korhonen, which is of unknown origin).

The suffix -nen, commonly used as a diminutive, was already in use in Eastern Finland (Savonia, Karelia) since the Middle Ages to create surnames in church records from the name of the parent (i.e., used as patronymic, e.g., Pentikäinen). Most people in Western Finland lacked surnames, and in the era of Finnish national awakening Finns started adopting "Virtanen-type" surnames, which followed the pattern of the existing surnames in Eastern Finland, but without any personal association, and the suffix -nen acquired a new usage as an abstract surname-generating suffix. There are also a few older surnames ending in -nen, of unknown origin. While most are rare, Korhonen is amongst the most common Finnish family names.

Later, the suffix -nen was often dropped altogether, and pairs of surnames, such as Lahtinen and Lahti, coexist. The surnames like Lahti are called the Laine type surnames, after the surname Laine, the most common one of this type.
