= Hannele (name) =

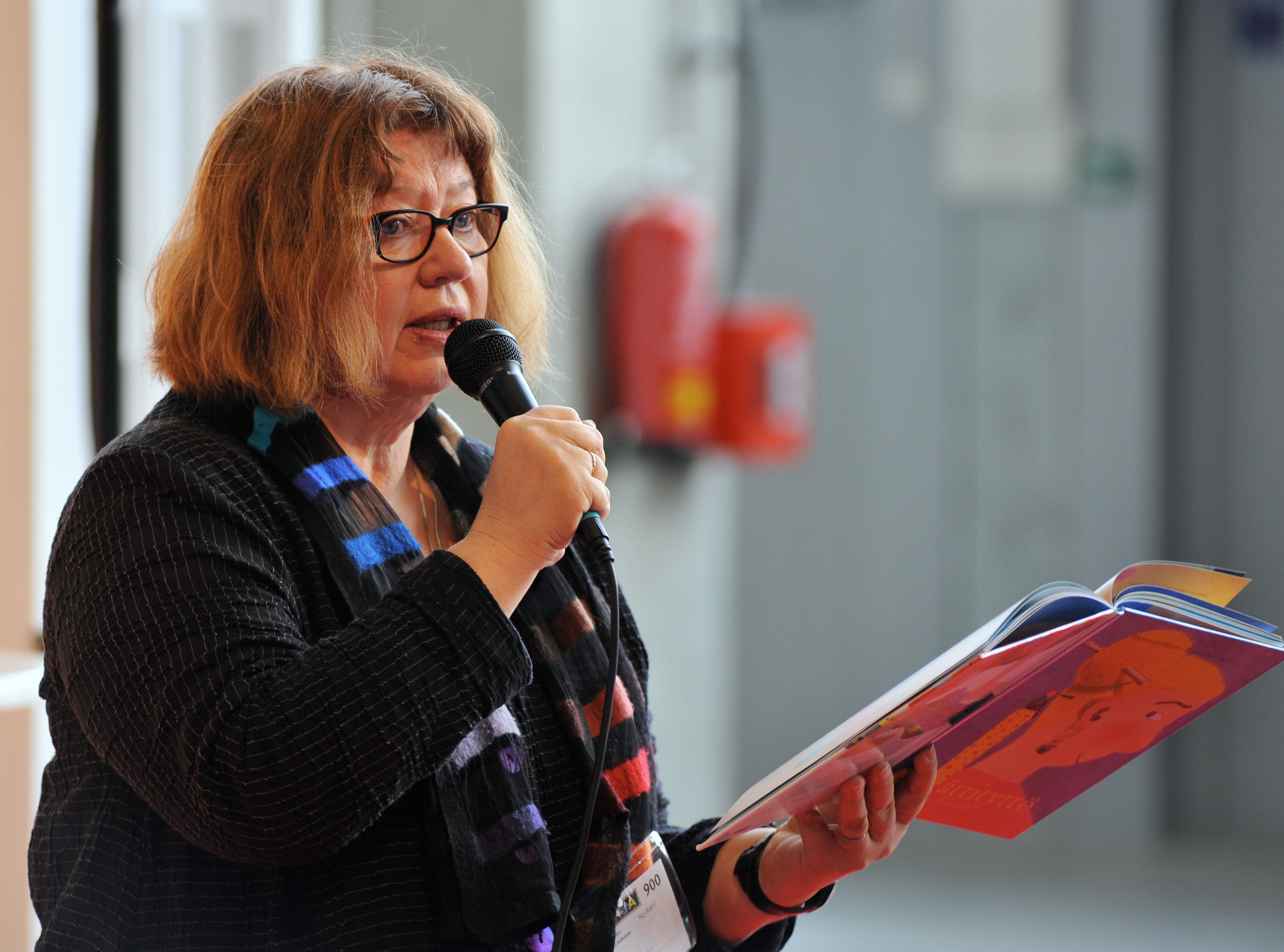
Hannele Huovi, Finnish writer

Hannele is a Finnish female given name in Finland. It originated as a variant of the name Johanna. Its nameday is celebrated on the 21st of July in Finland and the 5th of January in Sweden. As of 2012, more than 90,000 people in Finland have this name. It was most popular around the middle of the 20th century. It is listed by the Finnish Population Register Centre as one of the top 10 most popular female given names ever.

== Notable people ==
Some notable people who have this name are:

- Hannele Pokka, Finnish politician, former governor of the province of Lapland
- Hannele Tonna, Finnish ski-orienteering competitor and World Champion
- Hannele Klemettilä, Finnish historian and author
- Hannele Huovi, Finnish writer
- Hannele Ruohola-Baker, Finnish-American scientist
