= B. Virtanen =

Finnish comic strip written by Ilkka Heilä

Lennart Nilkén (left) says in Finnish: "What would that cost?" and B. Virtanen answers: "Evidently 3270 Finnish marks."

B. Virtanen is a Finnish comic strip written by Ilkka Heilä. In 2009, the comic was published in almost 50 newspapers.

The strip is about the family and work life of a typical Finnish man named B. Virtanen. His full first name is never revealed and few, if any, Finnish first names start with the letter B, which does not occur in Finnish except in loanwords. He is married and has a steady job but both cause him constant trouble as he is hen-pecked by his wife at home and oppressed by his superiors at work. The main setting is the office in which B. Virtanen works. His employer is named Oy Firma Ab, literally "Company Ltd."; its exact line of business is thus never revealed but the company has some sort of production since a factory has been mentioned.

Heilä explained the B in an interview: Heilä made the character for a newspaper comic strip contest in 1989, and almost the first thing in his mind was the name. In that time, people used to talk about "A-class" and "B-class" citizens. B. certainly isn't second class, but his life isn't really "A-class" either. The idea of the series is simple, everyone walks over him. Heilä made about 20 strips of that idea, and got the shared second prize of the competition.

The abbreviation of Virtanen's forename to an initial is not unusual in itself. It has been revealed in the comic that Virtanen does so because the name itself is so humiliating. In one strip his name is revealed to his co-workers (but censored to the reader) and the crowd bursts out laughing. Virtanen is among the most common surnames in Finland.

The strip contains some running gags. One example is B. Virtanen filling out a company survey. Criticism is often made impossible because there are only positive or more positive choices to choose from. If there are negative choices the superiors will intimidate Virtanen not to give any "wrong" answers. Another example is the constantly malfunctioning copy machine.

== Characters ==
B. Virtanen
The main character. A meek middle-aged, overworked and abused worker in an office. He has been an employee for at least seventeen years. At home, he is hen-pecked by his wife and run over by their son. Occasionally he attempts to stand up to his superiors, family and even his cat but invariably ends up failing.
Armi
B. Virtanen's domineering wife. She spends her days reading Me Siskot ("We Sisters") magazine and watching TV. She is prone to magnificent kitchen failures and is usually unable to produce food her family would be content to eat. She is significantly overweight and occasionally comes up with a dieting idea which tends to lead into even worse food and her forcing exercise on her husband as well.
Marko
B. Virtanen's son. A grade school aged boy who rebels against his parents, has abysmal school performance, smokes, and has been shown having a variety of illegal pastimes. Occasionally he tries to earn extra money by selling some of his parents' possessions e.g. their car.
Pasi
B. Virtanen's cat. Virtanen calls Pasi his best friend, but even though the cat is shown to be an affectionate and gentle family cat, it seems to stand higher in the family hierarchy. Virtanen cannot even make Pasi leave the recliner chair.
Reino Murikka
A project manager at the office and B. Virtanen's immediate superior. He is fat, bald and middle-aged. He is very harsh towards B. Virtanen and often makes him work overtime. He often takes credit for Virtanen's good work. He is depicted as simple and can hardly operate a copy machine or computer. Murikka still lives with his mother Selma Murikka and has very little experience in dating or relationships although he does have a crush on Miss Jantunen. He has a twin brother named Antero.
Selma Murikka
Reino Murikka's nurturing but overprotective mother. She relates critically to her son's would-be relationship with Miss Jantunen.
Miss Jantunen
The company's secretary. She strongly feels there is gender discrimination in the company and often points it out. She is aware of Murikka's feelings for her but is not interested in him.
Lennart Nilkén
A middle manager. He is fashionable and concerned with himself more than anything else. He has a habit of introducing convoluted and confusing reforms to the office and brown-nosing director Hynälä in hopes of raises and promotion. He does very little actual work and often sneaks out to play golf or tennis. He has a spoiled daughter named Lisette.
Director Hynälä
The company's CEO. He considers himself a perfect director "like in the good old days" but only cares about his company's profits and is very detached from the office's every-day reality. His underlings think of him as a dictator. He is almost always seen smoking a cigar. In one strip it was revealed that his father was the founder of the company and that is how he rose from errand boy directly to board of management.
Topi
The most junior employee in the company and the only one in a lower position than B. Virtanen. However, this is only because of the short history of his employment and he is looking forward to being promoted. In 2014, Topi started his mandatory service in the Finnish Defence Forces and will be on leave from the company during this time.
Säde
Lennart Nilkén's niece, temporarily replacing Topi as an errand person while he is doing his armed service. Säde is very loud-mouthed and rude to B. Virtanen and Reino Murikka and disinterested in her job. However, Virtanen and Murikka do not dare complain because their superior happens to be her uncle.
The Doctor
The company doctor who always fails in curing the employees.
