= Unto Korhonen =

Finnish diplomat

Unto Kullervo Korhonen (10 May 1931 – 15 April 2020) was a Finnish diplomat, a Licentiate of Technics. He was Finnish Ambassador to Lusaka from 1976 to 1980, to Hanoi from 1980 to 1983, to Dar es Salaam from 1987 to 1988, and a consultative officer in the Ministry for Foreign Affairs from 1983 to 1987 and from 1988 to 1991.

== Biography ==
Korhonen was born in Pielisensuu on 10 May 1931. He graduated from the Helsinki University of Technology as MSc in engineering in 1955 and Licentiate of Technics in 1963. Prior to the diplomatic career, he worked as a senior engineer in 1961–1965 in the National Land Survey and in 1966–1972 in the UN Expert Service in Pakistan. Thereafter, he was the office manager of the Ministry for Foreign Affairs from 1972 to 1976. Korhonen died on 15 April 2020, at the age of 88.
