= Tapio (given name) =

Tapio is a male given name common in Finland. The nameday is 18 June. As of January 2013 there were almost 140,000 people with this name in Finland. The name originates from the name of the Finnish god of forests, animals, and hunting. A common nickname for Tapio is Tapsa. It is listed by the Finnish Population Register Centre as one of the top 10 most popular male given names ever. Notable people with the name include:

- Tapio Hakanen (better known as DJ Orkidea), Finnish electronic music artist
- Tapio Hämäläinen, a Finnish actor
- Tapio Kantanen, Finnish athlete
- Tapio Korjus, Finnish javelin thrower
- Tapio Laakso, Finnish professional ice hockey player
- Tapio Laukkanen, Finnish rally driver
- Tapio Levo, Finnish ice hockey player
- Tapio Luusua, Finnish freestyle skier
- Tapio Nurmela, Finnish Nordic combined athlete
- Tapio Rautavaara, Finnish athlete, singer and actor
- Tapio Sipilä, Finnish wrestler
- Tapio Mäkelä, Finnish cross-country skier
- Tapio Wilska, Finnish musician
- Tapio Wirkkala, Finnish designer and sculptor
