= Kalevi Huotari =

Finnish politician

Keijo Kalevi Huotari (15 June 1924, Nuijamaa – 8 March 1975) was a Finnish farmer and politician. He was a Member of the Parliament of Finland, representing the Finnish Rural Party (SMP) from 1970 to 1972 and the Finnish People's Unity Party (SKYP) from 1972 until his death in 1975.
