= Janne =

- Gender: Unisex

Origin
- Region of origin: Nordic countries, Estonia

Janne is a common given name in the Nordic countries and Estonia. In Denmark, Norway and Estonia it is considered a feminine name (a short form of Johanne), while in Sweden and Finland it is considered masculine. In Sweden and Finland it is often used as a nickname for people with related (male) names based on Johannes such as Jan, Jean or Johan.

The name's origins lie in the ancient Hebrew names Yohanah/Yohanan (feminine/masculine), meaning "Yahweh (God) is gracious". The name spread to Greece along with Christianity, and became Ioanna/Ioannes. In the original, Greek version of the Bible both John the Baptist and John the Apostle are referred to as "Ioannes", and the feminine version of the name appears in "Ioanna, the wife of Chuza". The names then, through Latin Vulgate, became Joanna/Johanna/Johanne (feminine), and Johannes (masculine).

As the names spread through Europe along with Christianity, a number of simplified derivatives appeared, resulting in the large family of names to which Janne belongs: Johanna, John, Jan, Joan, Jahn, Johan, Juan, Jane, Jean (male) and Jean (female), Jeanne, Jonas, Janusz, Hannes, Hans and so forth.

Notable people with the name include:

- Janne Ahonen (born 1977), Finnish ski jumper and drag racer
- Janne Aikala (1975–1986), murder victim in Turku, Finland
- Janne Andersson (born 1962), Swedish football player and manager
- Janne Blichert-Toft (born 1953), Danish geochemist
- Janne Blomqvist (born 1972), Finnish swimmer
- Janne Carlsson (1937–2017), Swedish actor
- Janne Christoffersson (born 1970), Swedish singer and guitarist, better known as JB
- Janne Corax (born 1967), Swedish cyclist, mountaineer and explorer
- Janne Dahl (1882–1961), Swedish javelin thrower
- Janne Stigen Drangsholt (born 1974), Norwegian writer
- Janne Sophie Engeleiter (born 1995), German Paralympic athlete
- Janne Ferm (born 1980), Finnish rally co-driver
- Janne Formoe (born 1975), Norwegian actress
- Janne Furch (1915–1992), German screenwriter
- Janne Grönvall (born 1973), Finnish ice hockey player
- Janne Gustafsson (1883–1942), Swedish sport shooter
- Janne Haavisto (born 1964), Finnish drummer
- Janne Häkkinen (born 1984), Finnish orienteer
- Janne Halmkrona (born 1968), Finnish musician
- Janne Hänninen (born 1975), Finnish speed skater
- Janne Hannula (born 1982), Finnish footballer
- Janne Happonen (born 1984), Finnish ski jumper
- Janne Heikkinen (politician) (born 1990), Finnish politician
- Janne Heikkinen (volleyball) (born 1976), Finnish volleyball player
- Janne Henriksson (born 1981), Finnish footballer
- Janne Hietanen (born 1978), Finnish footballer
- Janne Holmén (born 1977), Finnish long-distance runner
- Janne Huokko (born 1974), Swedish ice hockey player and coach
- Janne Hyppönen (born 1970), Finnish footballer and manager
- Janne Ihamuotila (1868–1929), Finnish politician
- Janne Ijäs (born 1972), Finnish ice hockey centre
- Janne Immonen (born 1968), Finnish cross-country skier
- Janne Jaakkola (born 1967), Finnish general
- Janne Jalasvaara (born 1984), Finnish ice hockey player
- Janne Johannessen (born 1978), Norwegian journalist and newspaper editor
- Janne Bondi Johannessen (1960–2020), Norwegian linguist
- Janne Johansson, Swedish football chairman
- Janne Jokila (born 1982), Finnish ice hockey player
- Janne Josefsson (born 1957), Swedish investigative journalist
- Janne Juvonen (born 1994), Finnish ice hockey player
- Janne Kanerva (born 1970), Finnish weightlifter
- Janne Karlsson (ice hockey, born 1958), Swedish ice hockey player and coach
- Janne Karlsson (ice hockey, born 1964), Swedish ice hockey player and coach
- Janne Kataja (born 1980), Finnish entertainer
- Janne Katajisto (born 1978), Finnish boxer
- Janne Katosalmi (born 1994), Finnish ice hockey player
- Janne Keränen (born 1987), Finnish ice hockey player
- Janne Kettunen (born 1994), Finnish ice hockey player
- Janne Koivuranta (1885–1967), Finnish farmer and politician
- Janne Kolehmainen (born 1986), Finnish ice hockey player
- Janne Kolling (born 1968), Danish handball player
- Janne Koponen (born 1995), Finnish ice hockey defenceman
- Janne Korhonen (footballer) (born 1979), Finnish footballer
- Janne Korhonen (taekwondo) (1970–2023), Finnish taekwondo practitioner
- Janne Korpi (born 1986), Finland snowboarder
- Janne Kristiansen (born 1952), Norwegian jurist
- Janne Kumpulainen (born 1991), Finnish ice hockey left winger
- Janne Kuokkanen (born 1998), Finnish ice hockey player
- Janne Kuusi (born 1954), Finnish film director and writer
- Janne Kyttanen (born 1974), Finnish conceptual artist and designer
- Janne Laakkonen (born 1982), Finnish ice hockey player
- Janne Lahtela (born 1974), Finnish freestyle skier
- Janne Lahti (born 1982), Finnish ice hockey player
- Janne Läspä (born 2002), Finnish javelin thrower
- Janne Laukkanen (born 1970), Finnish ice hockey player
- Janne Lehtonen (born 1983), Finnish ex-soldier and television personality
- Janne Leskinen (born 1971), Finnish alpine skier
- Janne Lindberg (born 1966), Finnish footballer
- Janne Lundblad (1887–1940), Swedish equestrian
- Janne Madsen (born 1978), Danish footballer
- Janne Mäkelä (born 1971), Finnish footballer
- Janne Mark (born 1973), Danish vocalist and composer
- Janne Martikainen (1878–1934), Finnish politician
- Janne Haaland Matláry (born 1957), Norwegian political scientist and politician
- Janne Mertanen (born 1967), Finnish pianist
- Janne Friederike Meyer (born 1981), German equestrian
- Janne Mian (born 1965), Swedish football manager
- Janne Moilanen (born 1978), Finnish footballer
- Janne Mortil (born 1967), Canadian-American actress
- Janne Mugame (born 1982), Estonian para swimmer
- Janne Müller-Wieland (born 1986), German field hockey player
- Janne Mustonen (1901–1964), Finnish politician
- Janne Myrdal (born 1962), Member of the North Dakota Senate
- Janne Nielsen (born 1993), Danish athlete
- Janne Niinimaa (born 1975), Finnish ice hockey player
- Janne Nijman (born 1972), International lawyer
- Janne Nilsson (1882–1938), Swedish politician
- Janne Niskala (born 1981), Finnish ice hockey player
- Janne E. Nolan (1951–2019), American academic and foreign policy advisor
- Janne Sjelmo Nordås (born 1964), Norwegian politician
- Janne Öfverström (born 1991), Finnish ice hockey player
- Janne Oinas (born 1973), Finnish footballer
- Janne Ojala (born 1977), Finnish tennis player
- Janne Ojanen (born 1968), Finnish ice hockey player
- Janne Parviainen (born 1973), Finnish heavy metal drummer
- Janne Lucas Persson (born 1947), Swedish singer, songwriter and musician
- Janne Pesonen (born 1982), Finnish ice hockey player
- Janne Pitko (born 1981), Finnish curler from Espoo
- Janne Puhakka (1995–2024), Finnish ice hockey player
- Janne Johannes Puurtinen, birthname of Burton (musician) (born 1974), Finnish keyboardist
- Janne Räsänen (born 1978), Finnish footballer
- Janne Rasmussen (born 1970), Danish footballer
- Janne Reinikainen (actor), Finnish actor
- Janne Reinikainen (footballer) (born 1981), Finnish football player
- Janne Ritamäki (born 1986), Finnish ice hockey player
- Janne Rønningen (born 1969), Norwegian comedian and presenter
- Johannes Rydberg (1854–1919), Swedish physicist
- Janne Ryynänen (born 1988), Finnish Nordic combined skier
- Janne Saarinen (born 1977), Finnish footballer
- Janne Saksela (born 1993), Finnish footballer
- Janne Salli (born 1977), Finnish footballer
- Janne Salmi (born 1969), Finnish orienteer
- Janne Sankelo (born 1967), Finnish politician
- Janne Schäfer (born 1981), German swimmer
- Janne Schaffer (born 1945), Musical artist
- Janne Seppänen (born 1995), Finnish ice hockey player
- Janne Seurujärvi (born 1975), Finnish politician
- Janne Sirén (born 1970), Finnish art historian
- Janne M. Sjödahl (1853–1939), Swedish convert to LDS
- Janne Sjöström (1948–2013), Swedish footballer and manager
- Janne Sollie (born 1959), Norwegian civil servant
- Johan Gabriel Ståhlberg (1832–1873), Finnish priest
- Janne Stange (born 1986), Norwegian footballer
- Janne Stark (born 1963), Swedish guitarist and author
- Janne Stefansson (born 1935), Swedish cross-country skier
- Janne Stiak (born 2007), German racing driver
- Janne Suokonautio (born 1968), Finnish footballer
- Janne Svensson (born 1956), Swedish footballer
- Janne Tavi (born 1989), Finnish ice hockey player
- Janne Teller (born 1964), Danish author
- Janne Tolsa (born 1970), Finnish heavy metal musician
- Janne Tuohino (born 1975), Finnish rally driver
- Janne Turpeenniemi (born 1989), Finnish footballer
- Janne Tuven (born 1975), Norwegian handball player
- Janne Väätäinen (born 1975), Finnish former ski jumper
- Janne Väyrynen (born 1992), Finnish ice hockey player
- Janne Vellamo (born 1984), Finnish footballer
- Janne Vermasheinä (born 1970), Finnish swimmer
- Janne Virkkunen (born 1948), Finnish journalist
- Janne Virtanen (born 1969), Finnish former strongman
- Janne Virtanen (actor) (born 1967), Finnish actor
- Janne Wallenius (born 1968), Swedish reactor physicist
- Janne Westerlund (born 1973), Finnish musician, songwriter and visual artist
- Janne Wirman (born 1979), Finnish keyboardist
