= 2021–22 Mestis season =

2021–22 Mestis
- League: Mestis
- Sport: Ice hockey
- Duration: 23 September 2021 – April 2022
- Number of teams: 14

Regular season
- Best record: Ketterä
- Runners-up: K-Espoo

Playoffs
- Finals champions: Ketterä (3rd title)
- Runners-up: Kiekko-Espoo

Mestis seasons
- ← 2020–21 2022–23 →

The 2021–22 Mestis season was the 22nd season of Mestis, the second highest level of ice hockey in Finland after Liiga. Therefore, this season there would be 14 teams.

== Clubs ==
Team	City	Home arena, capacity	Founded	Head coach
FPS	Forssa	Forssa Ice Hall, 3,000	1931	(Finland) Asko Rantanen
Hermes	Kokkola	Kokkolan jäähalli, 4,200	1953	(Finland) Jere Härkälä
Hokki	Kajaani	Kajaanin jäähalli, 2,372	1968	(Finland) Pasi Räsänen
IPK	Iisalmi	Kankaan jäähalli, 1,358	1966	(Finland) Niko Härkönen
JoKP	Joensuu	PKS Areena, 4,800	1953	(Finland) Kari Martikainen
Ketterä	Imatra	Imatra Spa Areena, 1,200	1957	(Finland) Tuomo Ropo
KeuPa HT	Keuruu	Keuruun Jäähalli, 1,100	1995	(Finland) Tomas Westerlund
K-Espoo	Espoo	Espoo Metro Areena, 6,982	2018	(Finland) Kim Hirschovits
K-Vantaa	Vantaa	Trio Areena, 2,004	1994	(Finland) Mika Niskanen
KOOVEE	Tampere	Tampere Ice Stadium, 7,300	1929	(Finland) Vesa Viitakoski
Peliitat	Heinola	Versowood Areena, 2,686	1984	(Finland) Hannes Hyvönen
RoKi	Rovaniemi	Lappi Areena, 3,500	1979	(Finland) Maso Lehtonen
SaPKo	Savonlinna	Talvisalo ice rink, 2,833	1929	(Finland) ~~Niko Eronen~~ 7.10.2021 (Finland) Juho Nykänen
TUTO Hockey	Turku	Kupittaan jäähalli, 3,000	1929	(Finland) Antti Virtanen

== Regular season ==
Pos	Team	Pld	W	OTW	OTL	L	GF	GA	GD	PCT	Final Result
1	Ketterä	52	30	7	3	12	191	132	+59	.686	Advance to Quarterfinals
2	K-Espoo	52	26	9	4	13	158	126	+32	.641	Advance to Quarterfinals
3	JoKP	52	27	6	5	14	182	129	+53	.628	Advance to Quarterfinals
4	FPS	52	24	5	6	17	170	152	+18	.564	Advance to Quarterfinals
5	KeuPa HT	52	22	4	6	20	165	170	−5	.513	Advance to Quarterfinals
6	RoKi	52	19	8	7	18	152	161	−9	.513	Advance to Quarterfinals
7	Hokki	52	21	4	8	19	152	155	−3	.506	Advance to Wild-card round
8	IPK	52	18	8	6	20	143	151	−8	.487	Advance to Wild-card round
9	Hermes	52	18	4	9	21	142	151	−9	.455	Advance to Wild-card round
10	K-Vantaa	52	17	6	8	21	146	172	−26	.455	Advance to Wild-card round
11	TUTO Hockey	52	18	5	5	24	145	145	0	.442	Qualification to relegation playoffs
12	SaPKo	52	17	5	5	25	143	159	−16	.423	Qualification to relegation playoffs
13	Peliitat	52	12	9	5	26	132	163	−31	.378	Qualification to relegation playoffs
14	KOOVEE	52	10	5	8	29	130	185	−55	.308	Qualification to relegation playoffs

Source: Mestis

Rules for classification: 1) Points-per-game; 2) Goal difference; 3) Goals scored; 4) Head-to-head points; 5) Penalty minutes.

== Playoffs ==
Playoffs are being played in four stages. Wild-card round is a best-of-3 series, with the quarter-finals, the semifinals and the final being best-of-7 series. The teams are reseeded after the first two stages, so that the best team by regular season performance to make the quarter-finals and the semifinals faces the worst team in the corresponding stage.

=== Bracket ===
Wild-card round (best-of-3)
7	Hokki	2
10	K-Vantaa	1
8	IPK	2
9	Hermes	0

Quarter-finals (best-of-7)
1	Ketterä	4
8	IPK	1
2	K-Espoo	4
7	Hokki	0
3	JoKP	1
6	RoKi	4
4	FPS	4
5	KeuPa HT	3

Semi-finals (best-of-7)
1	Ketterä	4
6	RoKi	3
(Pairings are re-seeded after the first and second round)
2	K-Espoo	4
4	FPS	2

Finals (best-of-7)
1	Ketterä	4
2	K-Espoo	1
Bronze medal game
6	RoKi	1
4	FPS	0

=== Wild-card round ===
Hokki – K-Vantaa 2-1
28.03.2022	Hokki	K-Vantaa	3-0
30.03.2022	K-Vantaa	Hokki	4-2
31.03.2022	Hokki	K-Vantaa	3-2
Hokki won the series 2–1.

IPK – Hermes 2-0
28.03.2022	IPK	Hermes	1-0
30.03.2022	Hermes	IPK	2-3 OT
IPK won the series 2–0.

=== Quarter-finals ===
Ketterä – IPK 4-1
02.04.2022	Ketterä	IPK	8-1
04.04.2022	IPK	Ketterä	2-4
06.04.2022	Ketterä	IPK	6-2
08.04.2022	IPK	Ketterä	4-2
09.04.2022	Ketterä	IPK	5-3
Ketterä won the series 4–1.

JoKP – RoKi 1-4
02.04.2022	JoKP	RoKi	2-5
04.04.2022	RoKi	JoKP	5-2
06.04.2022	JoKP	RoKi	2-5
08.04.2022	RoKi	JoKP	2-4
09.04.2022	JoKP	RoKi	2-3 OT
RoKi won the series 4–1.

K-Espoo – Hokki 4-0
03.04.2022	K-Espoo	Hokki	6-4
04.04.2022	Hokki	K-Espoo	1-2 OT
06.04.2022	K-Espoo	Hokki	3-2
08.04.2022	Hokki	K-Espoo	3-4 OT
K-Espoo won the series 4–0.

FPS – KeuPa HT 4-3
02.04.2022	FPS	KeuPa HT	5-2
04.04.2022	KeuPa HT	FPS	5-2
06.04.2022	FPS	KeuPa HT	3-2
08.04.2022	KeuPa HT	FPS	0-3
09.04.2022	FPS	KeuPa HT	4-5
11.04.2022	KeuPa HT	FPS	5-4
13.04.2022	FPS	KeuPa HT	3-1
FPS won the series 4–3.

=== Semi-finals ===
Ketterä – RoKi 4-3
13.04.2022	Ketterä	RoKi	7-0
15.04.2022	RoKi	Ketterä	3-2 OT
17.04.2022	Ketterä	RoKi	3-2
19.04.2022	RoKi	Ketterä	4-3 OT2
21.04.2022	Ketterä	RoKi	1-3
22.04.2022	RoKi	Ketterä	1-4
24.04.2022	Ketterä	RoKi	4-3
Ketterä won the series 4–3.

K-Espoo – FPS 4-2
15.04.2022	K-Espoo	FPS	2-4
16.04.2022	FPS	K-Espoo	2-1
18.04.2022	K-Espoo	FPS	2-1
20.04.2022	FPS	K-Espoo	2-4
22.04.2022	K-Espoo	FPS	2-1
23.04.2022	FPS	K-Espoo	1-2 OT
K-Espoo won the series 4–2.

=== Bronze medal game ===
27 April 2022; 18:30 EEST	FPS	2–3 OT2 (0–0, 2–1, 0–1) (OT: 0–0, 0–1)	RoKi	Forssa Ice Hall, Forssa; Attendance: 912

Game reference

Petrus Lintonen
Goalies
Vilho Heikkinen
Referees:
Ville-Veikko Väkeväinen
Janne Wuorenheimo
Linesmen:
Luka Mäkinen
Niko Nurmio

Rybchyk (Karlsson, Alapuranen) – 21:36	1–0
Kärjä (Ronkainen, Vainio) – 27:40	2–0
	2–1	36:20 – Smedberg (Tumānovs, Poluvytnov)
	2–2	41:32 – Sedlak (Huttunen, Poluvytnov) (PP)
	2–3	82:51 – Canade (Järvelä, Kaarela)

10 min
Penalties
16 min
64
Shots
69

=== Finals ===
27 April 2022; 18:30 EEST	Ketterä	4–1 (1–1, 1–0, 2–0) score in the series: 1–0	K-Espoo	Imatra Spa Areena, Imatra; Attendance: 842

Game reference

Santeri Lipiäinen
Goalies
Jani Lampinen
Referees:
Henri Neva
Mikko Silvennoinen
Linesmen:
Juho-Pekka Inkinen
Teo Mäkinen

	0–1	08:50 – Turtiainen (Tuomaala) (PP1)
Kettunen (Viskari, Karjalainen) (PP1) – 17:19	1–1
Luhanka (Liuksiala, Ruotsi) – 23:08	2–1
Shekhovtsov (Rämö, Stråka) – 45:04	3–1
Perttu (Kautiainen, Rikkilä) (PP1) – 51:45	4–1

12 min
Penalties
16 min
71
Shots
20

29 April 2022; 18:30 EEST	K-Espoo	5–2 (1–2, 0–0, 4–0) score in the series: 1–1	Ketterä	Tapiolan urheilupuisto, Espoo; Attendance: 2,301

Game reference

Jani Lampinen
Goalies
Santeri Lipiäinen
Referees:
Antti Hölli
Jonne Mäkisalo
Linesmen:
Joonas Jalonen
Miro Skinnarla

	0–1	04:06 – Stråka (Kautiainen, Rämö)
	0–2	04:25 – Kettunen (Chizhikov)
Ollikainen (Tuomaala, Keskitalo) – 05:35	1–2
Ollikainen (Takkunen) – 52:35	2–2
Turtiainen (Lemetyinen, Villanen) (PP1) – 55:57	3–2
Iisakka (EN) – 59:07	4–2
Pesonen (EN) – 59:54	5–2

2 min
Penalties
4 min
35
Shots
57

30 April 2022; 17:00 EEST	Ketterä	3–0 (2–0, 0–0, 1–0) score in the series: 2–1	K-Espoo	Imatra Spa Areena, Imatra; Attendance: 1,032

Game reference

Santeri Lipiäinen
Goalies
Jani Lampinen
Referees:
Jani Pesonen
Ville-Veikko Väkeväinen
Linesmen:
Luka Mäkinen
Niko Nurmio

Rämö (Rikkilä, Perttu) (PP1) – 11:44	1–0
Perttu (Rikkilä) – 19:59	2–0
Korhonen – 43:10	3–0

0 min
Penalties
8 min
38
Shots
34

2 May 2022; 18:30 EEST	K-Espoo	1–2 (0–1, 1–1, 0–0) score in the series: 1–3	Ketterä	Tapiolan urheilupuisto, Espoo; Attendance: 2,514

Game reference

Jani Lampinen
Goalies
Santeri Lipiäinen
Referees:
Antti Hölli
Jonne Mäkisalo
Linesmen:
Joonas Jalonen
Miro Skinnarla

	0–1	04:43 – Kautiainen (Vertanen, Luhanka)
Villanen (Hopponen, Turtiainen) (PP1) – 23:49	1–1
	1–2	37:13 – Liuksiala (Kettunen, Haaparanta)

6 min
Penalties
4 min
29
Shots
36

4 May 2022; 18:30 EEST	Ketterä	4–1 (1–1, 2–0, 1–0) score in the series: 4–1	K-Espoo	Imatra Spa Areena, Imatra; Attendance: 1,350

Game reference

Santeri Lipiäinen
Goalies
Jani Lampinen
Referees:
Jani Pesonen
Ville-Veikko Väkeväinen
Linesmen:
Luka Mäkinen
Niko Nurmio

	0–1	15:34 – Rantaeskola (Tuomaala, Ollikainen)
Kettunen (Vertanen, Haaparanta) – 18:49	1–1
Kautiainen (Kaksonen) – 22:08	2–1
Ruotsi (Liuksiala, Rämö) – 26:55	3–1
Viskari – 57:11	4–1

8 min
Penalties
4 min
39
Shots
29

== Relegation ==
The bottom four teams will face the top two teams from Suomi-sarja in a double round-robin format. The four best placed get a place in Mestis for the next season.

Pos	Team	Pld	W	OTW	OTL	L	GF	GA	GD	Pts	Final Result
1	TUTO Hockey	10	9	0	0	1	47	20	+27	27	Qualified for 2022-2023 Mestis season
2	Peliitat	10	5	2	1	2	47	29	+18	20	Qualified for 2022-2023 Mestis season
3	SaPKo	10	3	3	1	3	39	34	+5	16	Qualified for 2022-2023 Mestis season
4	KOOVEE	10	4	0	1	5	34	32	+2	13	Qualified for 2022-2023 Mestis season
5	JHT Kalajoki	10	2	0	2	6	27	51	−24	8	Relegated to Suomi-sarja
6	D-Kiekko	10	0	2	2	6	23	51	−28	6	Relegated to Suomi-sarja

== Final rankings ==
Gold medal	Ketterä
Silver medal	K-Espoo
Bronze medal	RoKi
4	FPS
5	JoKP
6	KeuPa HT
7	Hokki
8	IPK
9	Hermes
10	K-Vantaa
11	TUTO Hockey
12	SaPKo
13	Peliitat
14	KOOVEE
