= Reinikainen =

Reinikainen is a Finnish surname. Notable people with the surname include:

- Janne Reinikainen (actor) (born 1969), Finnish actor
- Tepa Reinikainen (born 1976), Finnish shot putter
- Janne Reinikainen (footballer) (born 1981), Finnish football player
