= Tankless water heating =

Water heaters that instantly heat water as it flows through the device

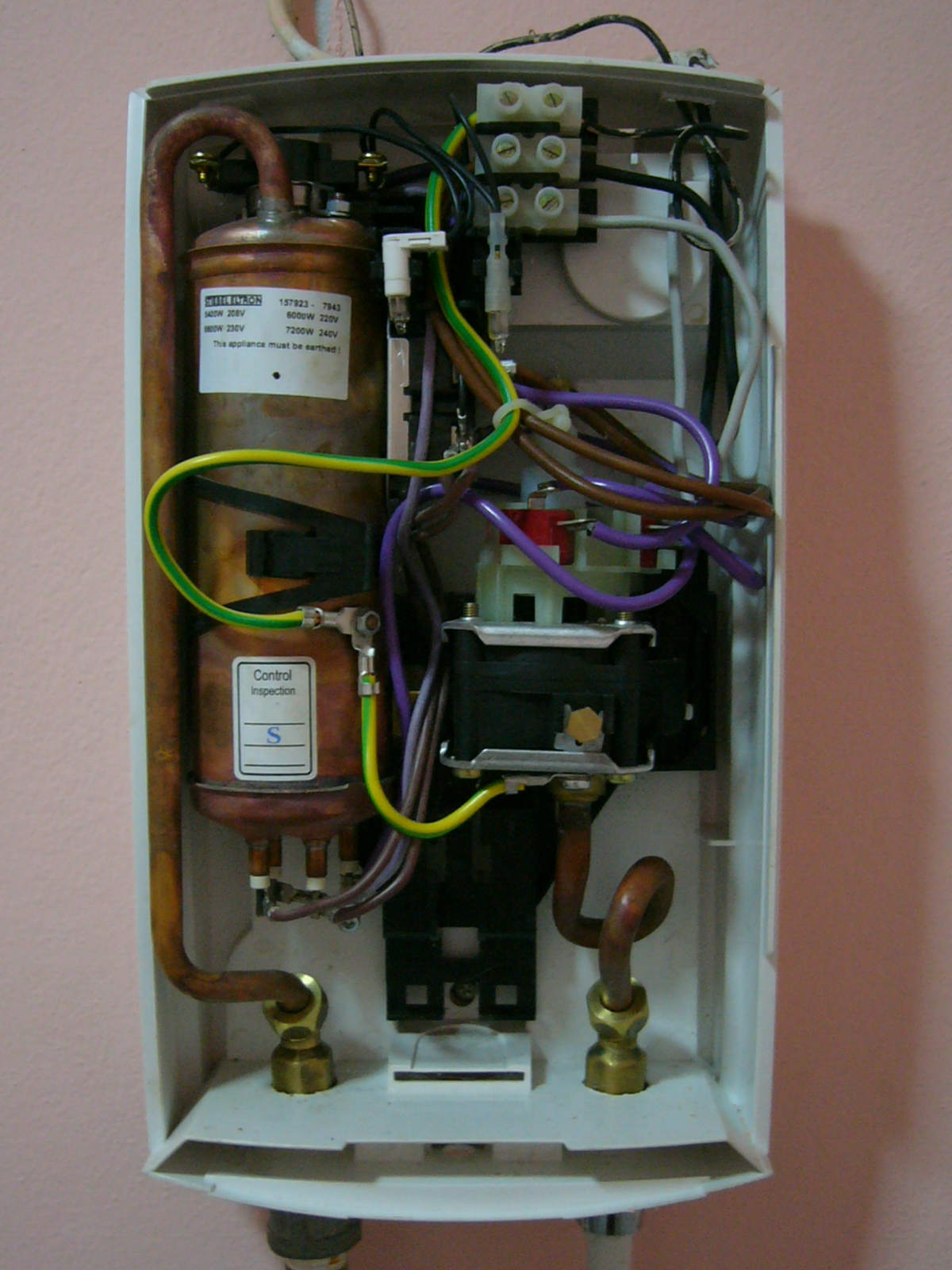
The inside of a hydraulically operated two-stage tankless heater, heated by single-phase electric power. The copper tank contains heating elements with 7.2 kW maximum power.

Tankless water heaters—also called instantaneous, continuous flow, inline, flash, on-demand, or instant-on water heaters—are water heaters that instantly heat water as it flows through the device, and do not retain any water internally except for what is in the heat exchanger coil unless the unit is equipped with an internal buffer tank. Copper heat exchangers are preferred in these units because of their high thermal conductivity and ease of fabrication. However, copper heat exchangers are more susceptible to scale buildup than stainless steel heat exchangers.

Tankless heaters may be installed throughout a household at more than one point-of-use (POU), far from or without a central water heater, or larger centralized whole house models may still be used to provide all the hot water requirements for an entire house. The main advantages of tankless water heaters are a plentiful, practically limitless continuous flow of hot water (as compared to a limited flow of continuously heated hot water from conventional tank water heaters), and potential energy savings under some conditions due to the use of energy only when in use, and the elimination of standby energy losses since there is no hot water tank.

The main disadvantage of these systems other than their high initial costs (equipment and installation) is the required yearly maintenance.

In order to provide on-demand, continuous hot water, tankless units use heat exchangers with many small passageways consisting of parallel plates or tubes. This increased number of passageways and small internal size create a large surface area for fast heat transfer. Unfortunately, this design can result in scale build up that can block the small channels of the heat exchanger reducing efficiency and eventually cause the unit to shut down from over heating. For this reason most manufacturers require accurate water testing and installation of a water treatment system before installing the unit and yearly descaling using permanently installed service valves. Due to the high efficiency ratings of tankless water heaters, these costs are usually offset by the energy savings and rebates from utility, state, and federal programs for installing energy efficient equipment.

== Operation ==
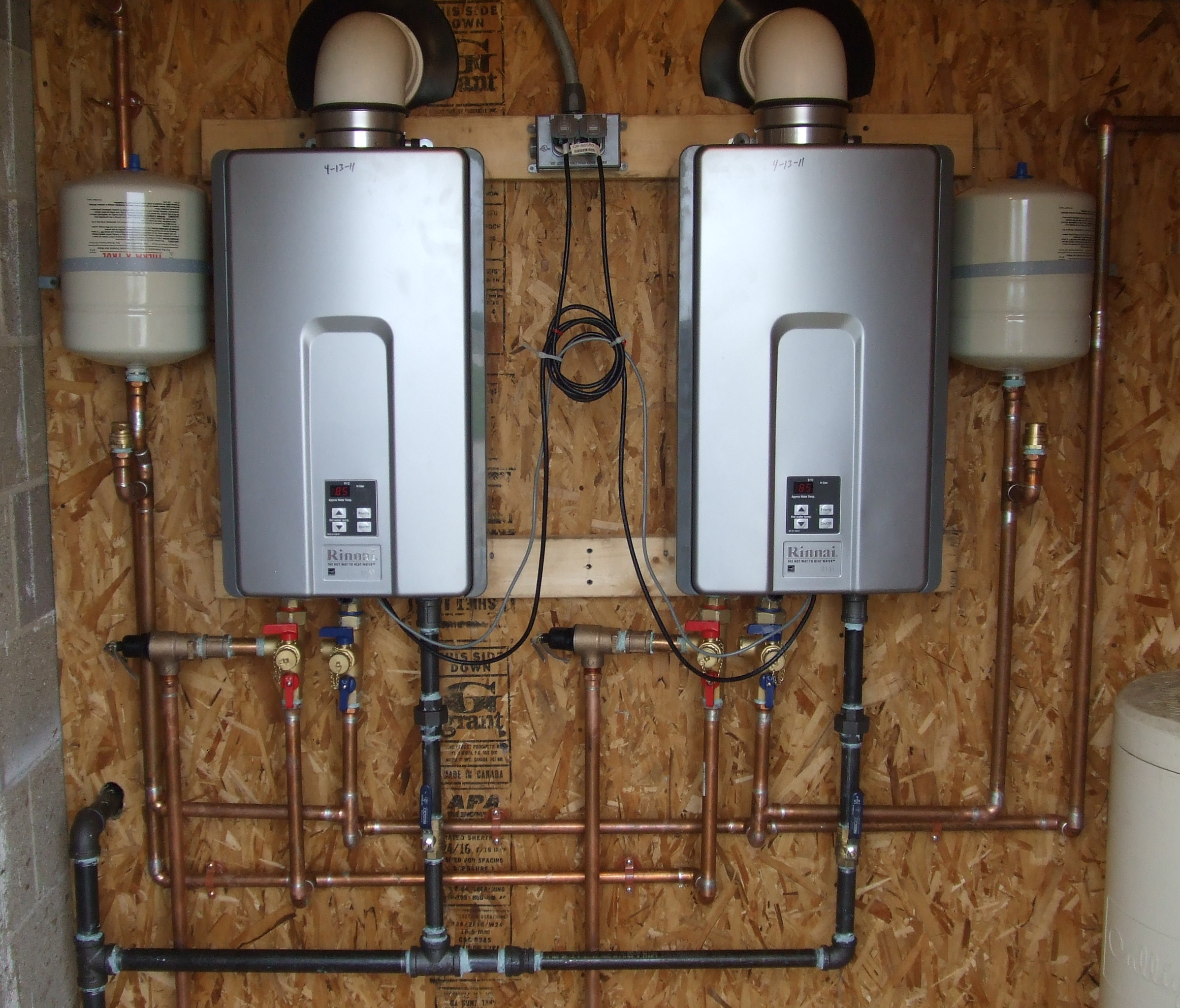
Tankless gas electronic ignition water heaters. Gas water heaters have an exhaust vent or one to two exhaust pipes on the top, and still require electric power for electronics, sensing and ignition.

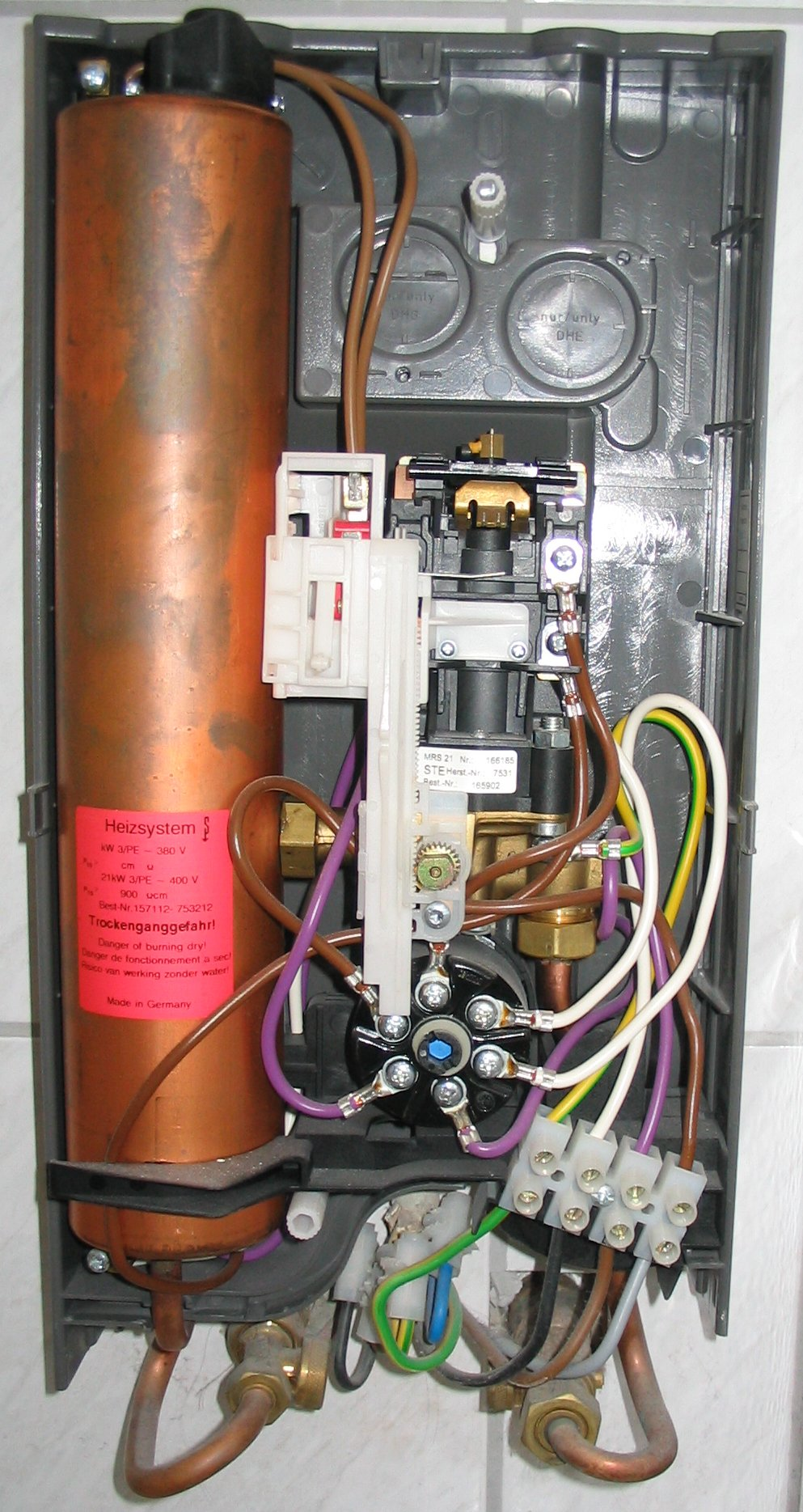
A three-phase, 21 kW, 400-volt tankless water heater in Europe, with new European color coding for three-phase power. There are also heaters that use several single-phase circuits instead

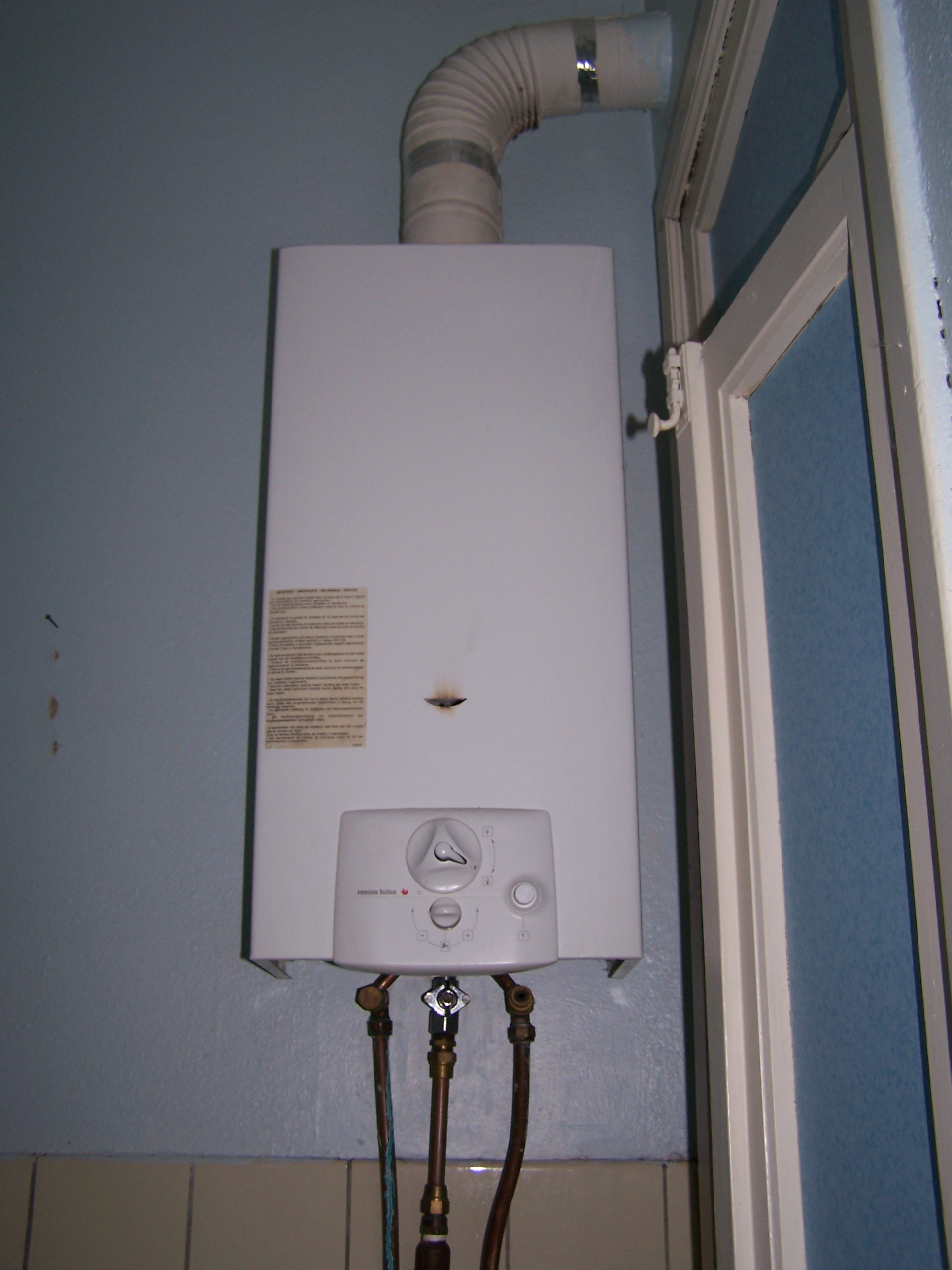
Tankless gas water heater with pilot light for ignition

The heater is normally turned off, but is equipped with flow sensors which activate it when water travels through them. A negative feedback loop is used to bring water to the target temperature. The water circulates through a copper heat exchanger and is warmed by gas or electrical heating. Since there is no finite tank of hot water that can be depleted, the heater provides a continuous supply. To protect the units in acidic environments, durable coatings or other surface treatments are available. Acid-resistant coatings are capable of withstanding temperatures of 1000 °C.

== Combination boilers ==
Combination or combi boilers combine the central heating with domestic hot water (DHW) in one device. When DHW is used, a combination boiler stops pumping water to the heating circuit and diverts all the boiler's power to heating DHW. Some combis have small internal water storage vessels combining the energy of the stored water and the gas or oil burner to give faster DHW at the taps or to increase the DHW flow rate.

Combination boilers are rated by the DHW flow rate. The kW ratings for domestic units are typically 24 kW to 54 kW, giving approximate flow rates of 9 to 23 litres (2.4 to 6.1 US gal) per minute. Larger units are used in commercial and institutional applications, or for multiple-unit dwellings. High flow-rate models can simultaneously supply two showers.

Combination boilers require less space than conventional tanked systems, and are significantly cheaper to install, since water tanks and associated pipes and controls are not required. Another advantage is that more than one unit may be used to supply separate heating zones or multiple bathrooms, giving greater time and temperature control. For example, one 'combi' might supply the downstairs heating system and another the upstairs, duplication guarding against complete loss of heating and DHW in the event that one unit fails, provided that the two systems are interconnected with valves (normally closed).

Combination boilers are popular in Europe where market share in some countries is in excess of 70%, with a projected rise in the United Kingdom to 78% by 2020. This trend is attributed in part by a social trend towards more numerous but smaller households and an ever-increasing trend towards physically smaller and often high density housing.

Disadvantages of combination systems include water flow rates inferior to a storage cylinder particularly in winter (when more hot water is used for mixing because the cold water is colder), and a requirement that overall power ratings must match peak heating requirements. The heating and DHW demands usually differ, and since installers will select a boiler to meet the larger demand (which is usually DHW in most homes), it will be oversized for the smaller demand; an oversized boiler will operate less efficiently due to problems such as short cycling and having increased return water temperatures that reduce efficiency. While ‘on demand’ water heating improves energy efficiency, the volume of water available at any given moment is limited, and the design of a 'combi' must be matched to the water supply pressure.

Some designs dating from before the 21st century, notably the Ideal Sprint, included as standard a flow regulator that permitted the same model to function efficiently in both high and low pressure mains water supply areas, thus accommodating wide supply pressure variations often encountered in otherwise similar urban settings such as Greater London.

While combination boilers have more moving parts and are thus widely held to be less reliable than tank systems, the twin trends towards replacement of parts based on a pre-set design life and replaceable digital controls for 'traditional' systems has largely eroded this distinction.

== Point-of-use (POU) water heaters ==
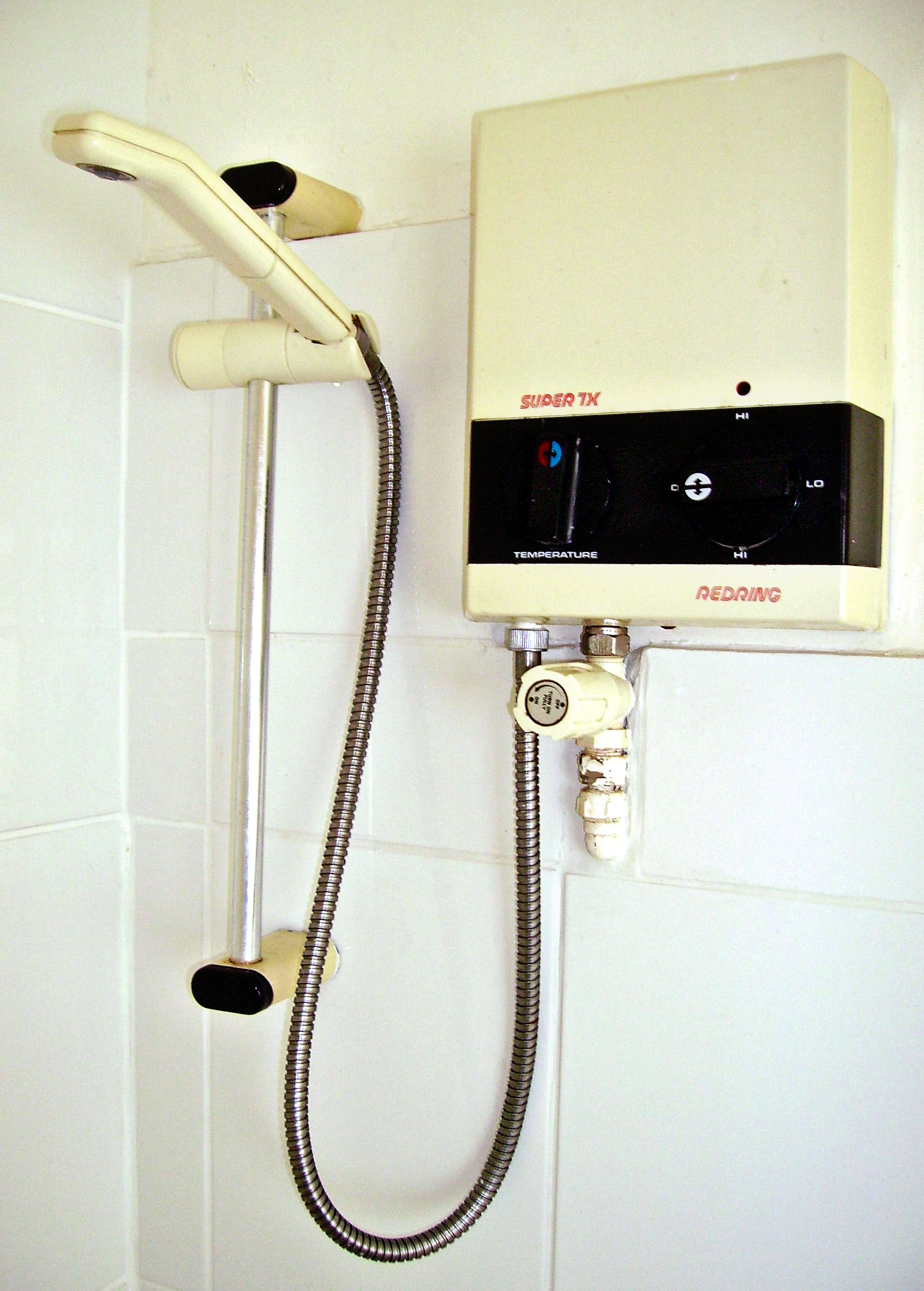
Electric point-of-use (POU) tankless water heater, or electric shower (Britain)

Point-of-use (POU) tankless water heaters are located immediately where the water is being used, so the water is almost instantly hot, which reduces water wastage. POU tankless heaters also can save more energy than centrally installed tankless water heaters, because no hot water is left in lengthy supply pipes after the flow is shut off. However, POU tankless water heaters are often installed in combination with a central water heater, since the former type have usually been limited to under 6 litres/minute (1.5 US gallons/minute), which is sufficient for only light usage. In many situations, the initial expense of buying and installing a separate POU heater for every kitchen, laundry room, bathroom, and sink can outweigh the money saved in water and energy bills. In the US, POU water heaters until recently were almost always electrical, and electricity is often substantially more expensive than natural gas or propane (when the latter fuels are available). Regular maintenance, such as descaling, is essential for Point-of-use (POU) tankless water heaters to prevent mineral buildup, which can reduce efficiency and increase operating costs.

In recent years, higher-capacity tankless heaters have become more widely available, but their feasibility may still be limited by the infrastructure's ability to furnish energy (maximum electrical amperage or gas flow rate) fast enough to meet peak hot water demand. In the past, tank-type water heaters have been used to compensate for lower energy delivery capacities, and they are still useful when the energy infrastructure may have a limited capacity, often reflected in peak demand energy surcharges.

In theory, tankless heaters can always be somewhat more efficient than storage tank water heaters. In both kinds of installation (centralized and POU), the absence of a tank saves energy compared to conventional tank-type water heaters, which have to reheat the water in the tank as it cools off while waiting for use (this is called "standby loss"). In some installations, the energy lost by a tanked heater located inside a building merely helps to heat the occupied space. This is true for an electric unit, but for a gas unit some of this lost energy leaves through the exhaust vent. However, if at any time the building must be cooled to maintain comfortable temperatures, the heat lost from a hot water tank located in the conditioned space must be removed by the air conditioning system, thus requiring larger cooling capacity and energy usage.

With a central water heater of any type, any cold water standing in the pipes between the heater and the point-of-use is dumped down the drain as hot water travels from the heater. This water wastage can be avoided if a recirculator pump is installed, but at the cost of the energy to run the pump, plus the energy to reheat the water recirculated through the pipes. Some recirculating systems reduce standby loss by operating only at select times—turning off late at night, for example. This saves energy at the expense of greater system complexity.

== Hybrid water heaters ==
A hybrid water heater is a water heating system that integrates technology traits from both the tank-type water heaters and the tankless water heaters. It maintains water pressure and consistent supply of hot water across multiple hot water applications, and like its tankless cousins, it is efficient and can supply a continuous flow of hot water on demand.

The hybrid approach is designed to eliminate general shortcomings of other technologies. For example, hybrids are activated by either thermostat (similar to tanked) or flow (similar to tankless).

Hybrids have small storage tanks that temper incoming cold water. Thus they only have to increase water temperature from warm to hot, unlike tankless which has to raise completely cold water to hot. The defining characteristics of a "hybrid water heater" are:

- A combination of the water flow capacity of a tank, and efficiency of tankless
- Built-in small storage water reservoir as part of heat exchanger (typically between 2 US gallons (7.6 L; 1.7 imp gal) to 20 gallons)
- Dual activation: flow sensing and thermostat control

Hybrid water heaters can be gas-fired (natural gas or propane), or be electrically powered using a combination of heat pump and conventional electric heating element.

=== Operation ===
A gas hybrid water heater uses a modulating infrared burner that is triggered by water flow or thermostat. The multi-pass heat exchanger drives heat down then recycles it through baffled pipes for maximum efficiency. Water fills the reservoir from bottom up and spreads evenly around the heating pipes, producing continuous hot water with consistent pressure and temperature.

During low-flow situations, the hybrid behaves like a tank-type heater by having minimum fixed fuel usage and thermostat activation. Although equipped with some storage capacity, the small volume minimizes standby fuel usage. Hybrids also share additional traits with tank-type heaters like a floor-standing installation, standard PVC venting, draining pan, and they can be installed with a recirculation pump for even more water efficiency.

During high demand, high-flow situations, hybrid technology behaves more like a tankless heater, with high heating capacity and full modulation to supply a continuous stream of hot water across multiple applications. This produces fuel efficiencies similar to tankless heaters, but with higher flow capacity.

=== Efficiency ===
The table below compares the efficiencies of different types of tankless water heating.

	Hybrid	Tankless	Tank
Fuel	natural gas	natural gas	natural gas
Material	cast iron	copper	cast iron
Efficiency	average 86%	average 80%	average 60%
Nitrous oxide emissions (PPM)	5–30	30–40	60–90
Carbon monoxide emissions (PPM)	40–45	190–200	200–250
Exhaust temp.	53–68 °C (128–155 °F)	199–210 °C (390–410 °F)	249–260 °C (480–500 °F)

== Controls ==
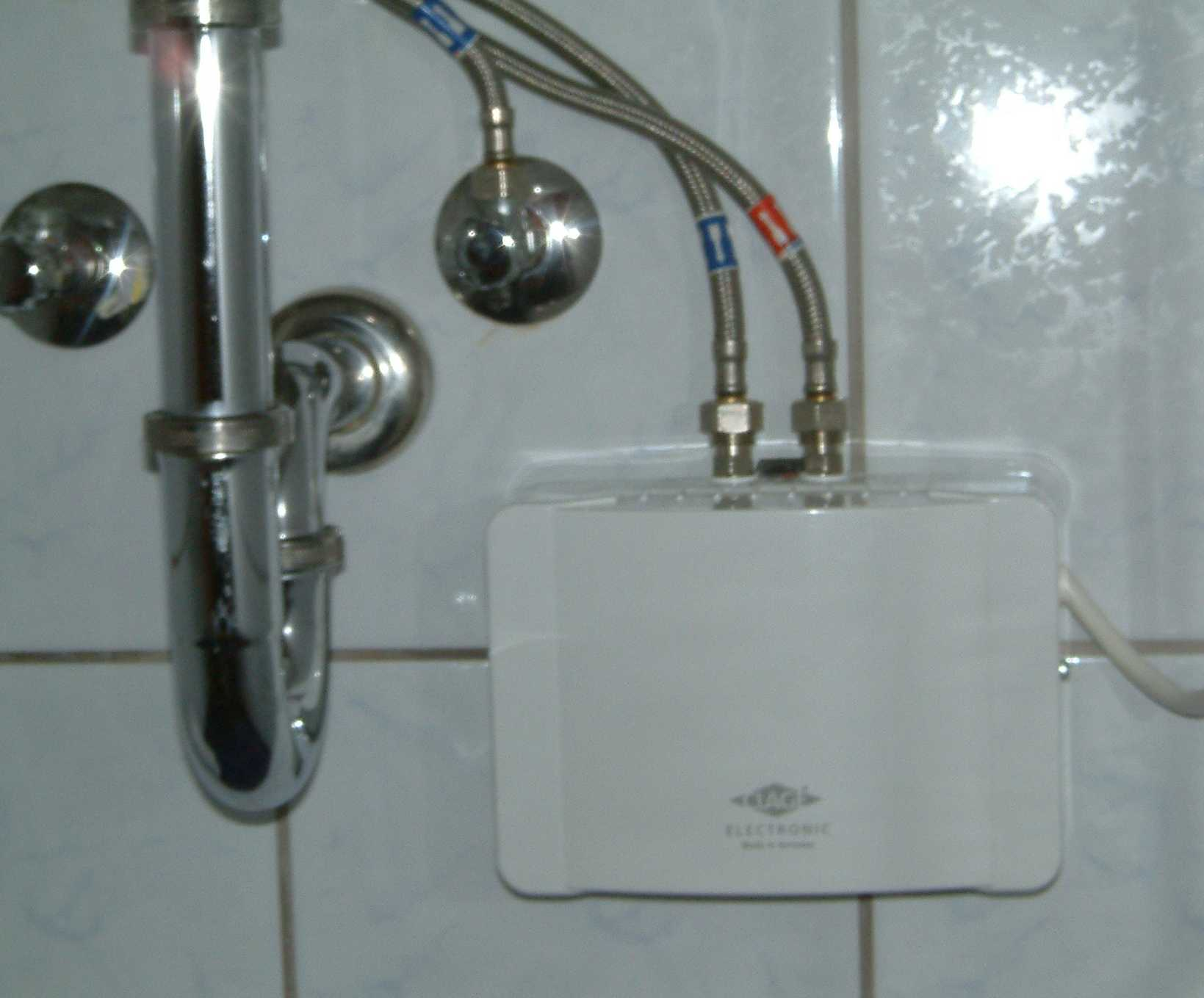
Electric point-of-use (POU) tankless water heater, wall-mounted under a sink (Germany)

Tankless water heaters can be further divided into two categories according to their heating capability: "full on/full off" versus "modulated". Full on/full off units do not have a variable power output level; the unit is either fully on or completely off. This can cause an annoying and possibly hazardous variation of hot water temperature as the flow of water through the heater varies. Modulated tankless water heaters change their heat output in response to the flow rate of water running through the unit. This is usually done by using a flow sensor, a modulating gas valve, an inlet water temperature sensor, and an outlet water temperature sensor-choke valve. A properly configured modulating heater can supply the same output temperature of water at differing water flow rates within their rated capacity, usually maintaining a close range of ±2 °C.

A high-efficiency condensing combination boiler provides both space heating and water heating, and is an increasingly popular choice in UK houses, accounting for over half of all new domestic boilers installed.

Under current North American conditions, the most cost-effective configuration from an operating viewpoint often is to install a central (tank-type or tankless) water heater for most of the house, and to install a POU tankless water heater at any distant faucets or bathrooms. However, the most economic design may vary according to the relative electricity, gas and water prices in the locality, the layout of the building, and how much (and when) hot water is used. Only electric tankless water heaters were widely available for many years, and they are still used for low-initial-cost POU heaters, but natural gas and propane POU heaters have now become available for consideration.

== Advantages ==
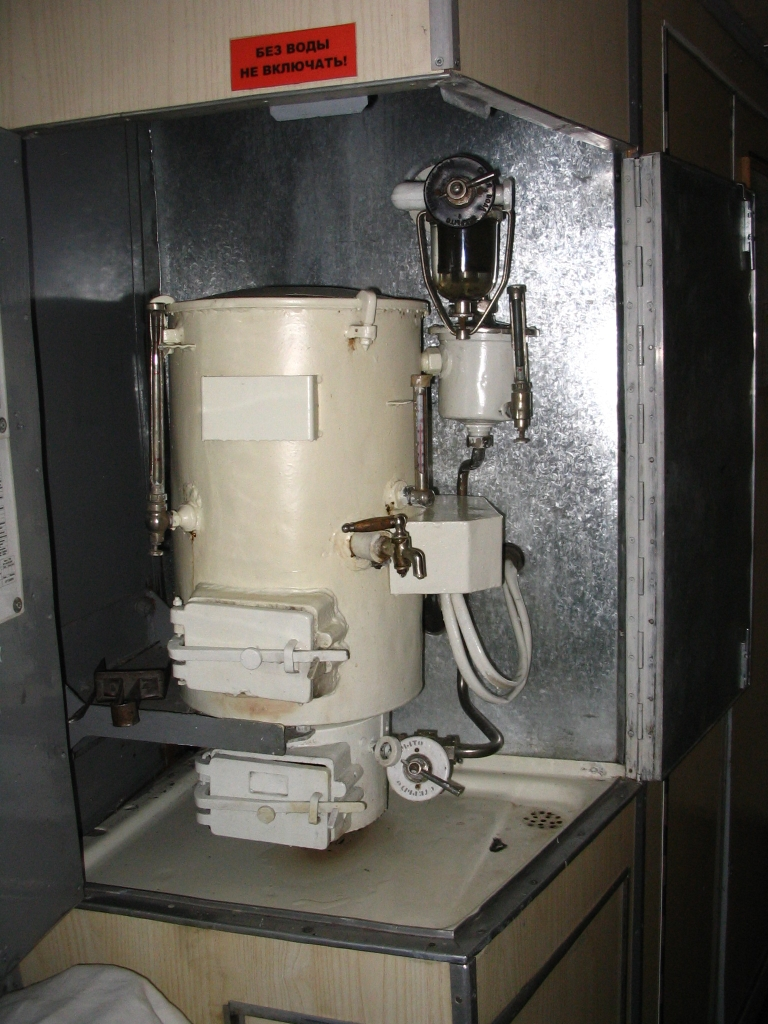
Mobile water heater in a train car (Russia)

Tankless water heaters provide many advantages:

- Long term energy savings: Although a tankless water heater typically costs more initially, it usually costs less to operate because of lower energy use –only heating as required. Even homes or buildings with high demand for hot water may realize some level of savings. If instant hot water at taps at limited hours is a priority, a recirculation system can be accommodated by using an aquastat and timer to decrease the added heat loss from the recirculation system. If the storage tank of an electric heater is highly insulated, so that the outer surface of the tank is only slightly warmer than the ambient air, the savings with a tankless heater is less.
- Savings in water use: Users in remote points in the building do not have to run the hot water as long, waiting for it to get to the faucet.
- Unlimited hot water: Though flow rate determines the amount of hot water the heater can produce, it can deliver it at that flow rate indefinitely. However, this can also be an ecological disadvantage, as running out of hot water limits use, but a tankless heater provides no such limit.
- Less physical space: Most tankless water heaters can be mounted on a wall or internally in a building's structure. This means less physical space must be dedicated to heating water. Even systems that can't be mounted on walls take up less space than a tank-type water heater.
- Reduced risk of water damage: No stored water means there is no risk of water damage from a tank failure or rupture, though pipe or fitting failure remains possible.
- Temperature compensation: A temperature-compensating valve tends to eliminate the issue where the temperature and pressure from tankless heaters decrease during continuous use. Most new generation tankless water heaters stabilize water pressure and temperature by a bypass valve and a mixing valve incorporated in the unit. Modern tankless are not inversely proportional, because they regulate the amount of water they heat and discharge, and therefore stabilize water temperature by using a flow control valve. Temperature change, not flow speed, is the issue the water heater must address. The wider the temperature rise, the less flow from the unit—the smaller the temperature rise, the greater the flow. The flow control valve, in conjunction with thermistors, maintains a stable temperature throughout the use of the unit.
- Safety: Tankless water heaters precisely control water temperature, which means dangerous temperature levels and spikes are less likely. An additional safety advantage stems from reduced exposure to dissolved toxic metals, which tend to occur at higher concentrations in hot water which has resided in a conventional water heater tank for significant periods of time.

== Disadvantages ==
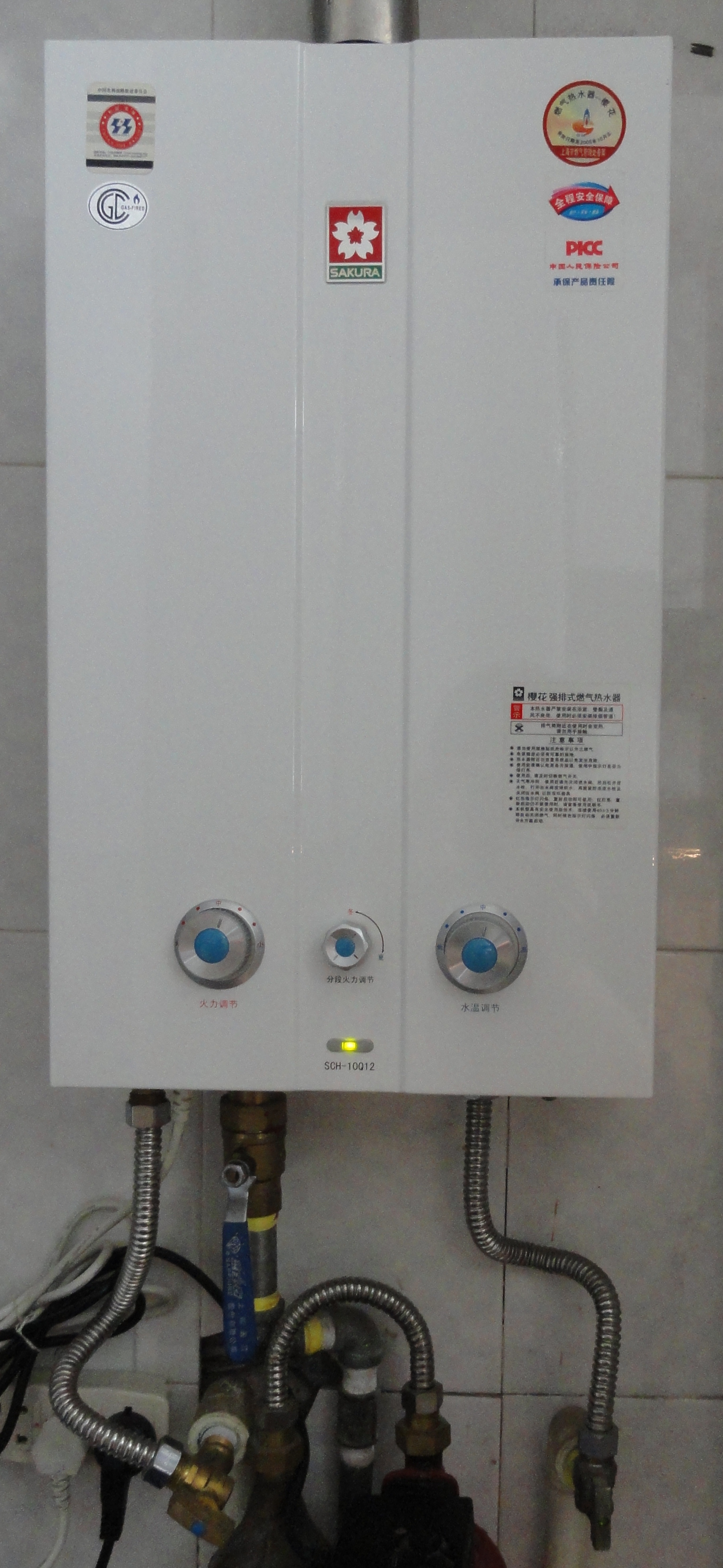
Gas tankless water heater (Taiwan)

Tankless water heaters also have disadvantages:

- Startup costs: Beyond the 2x-4x larger initial purchase price (vis-à-vis a tanked water heater, the installation of a tankless system comes at an increased cost, particularly in retrofit applications. They tend to be particularly expensive in areas such as the US where they are not dominant compared to established tank design. E.g., installer may have to increase the size of the electrical wiring or gas pipeline to handle the load, and even replace the existing vent pipe. Many tankless units have fully modulating gas valves that range from as low as 10,000 to over 1,000,000 BTUs. Most electrical tankless heaters require AWG 10 or 8 wire, corresponding to 5.5 or 8.5 mm^{2} for typical POU (point of use) heaters at North American voltages. Larger whole-house electric units may require up to AWG 2 wire. In gas appliances, both pressure and volume requirements must be met for optimum operation.
- Start-up delay: There may be a longer wait for hot water. A tankless water heater only heats water on demand, so idle water in the piping starts at room temperature. Thus, there may be a more apparent "flow delay" for hot water to reach a distant faucet (in non-point-of-use systems). Many models sold in the UK have introduced a small heat store within the combination boiler to address this issue. This "keep hot" facility considerably improves the standard of hot water service, which some people otherwise find unacceptably poor with a combination boiler, but uses considerably more fuel in summer.
- Intermittent-use: There is a short delay (1–3 seconds) between when the water begins to flow and when the heater's flow detector activates the heating elements or gas burner. In the case of continuous-use applications (showers, baths, washing machines) this is not an issue as the heater never stops heating. However, for intermittent-use applications (i.e., turning off/on a hot water faucet at a sink) this can result in initially hot water, followed by a small amount of cold water as the heater re-activates, followed again by hot water. This is particularly an issue if hot water pipes are poorly insulated. The user experience is that after initially getting hot water flowing, the user turns off the valve and then a short time later turns the valve back on again. Hot water starts flowing once again at the valve from the hot water already in the piping, but at the same time, some heaters must let some amount of cold water into the piping during the reactivation time. Some time later (depending on the length of piping from the tank to the valve) this cold section of water arrives at the sink, followed shortly thereafter by hot water again. The initial thought of the user can be that the heater is failing intermittently.
- Recirculation systems: Since a tankless water heater is inactive when hot water is not being used, they are incompatible with passive (convection-based) hot water recirculation systems. They may be incompatible with active hot water recirculation systems and certainly use more energy to constantly heat water within the piping, defeating one of a tankless water heater's primary advantages. On-demand recirculating pumps are often used to minimize hot water wait times from tankless water heaters and save water being wasted down the drain. On-demand recirculating pumps are activated by push-button or other sensor. A water contacting temperature probe installed at the hot water usage point signals the pump to stop. Single-cycle pumping events only occur when hot water is needed, thereby preventing the energy waste associated with constantly heating water within piping.
- Achieving cooler temperatures: Tankless water heaters often have minimum flow requirements before the heater is activated, and this can result in a gap between the cold water temperature, and the coolest warm water temperature that can be achieved with a hot and cold water mix.
- Maintaining constant shower temperature: Similarly, unlike with a tank heater, the hot water temperature from a non-modulated tankless heater is inversely proportional to the rate of the water flow—the faster the flow, the less time the water spends in the heating element being heated. Mixing hot and cold water to the "right" temperature from a single-lever faucet (say, when taking a shower) takes some practice. Also, when adjusting the mixture in mid-shower, the change in temperature initially reacts as a tanked heater does, but this also changes the flow rate of hot water. Therefore, some finite time later the temperature changes again very slightly and requires readjustment. This is typically not noticeable in non-shower applications.
- Operation with low supply pressure: Tankless systems are reliant on the water pressure that is delivered to the property. In other words, if a tankless system is used to deliver water to a shower or water faucet, the pressure is the same as the pressure delivered to the property and cannot be increased, whereas in tanked systems the tanks can be positioned above the water outlets (in the loft/attic space for example) so the force of gravity can assist in delivering the water, and pumps can be added into the system to increase pressure. Power showers, for example, cannot be used with tankless systems because the tankless systems cannot deliver the hot water at a fast enough flow rate required by the pump.
- Time-of-use metering and peak electrical loads: Tankless electric heaters, if installed in a large percentage of homes within an area, can create demand management problems for electrical utilities. Because these are high-current devices, and hot water use tends to peak at certain times of the day, their use can cause short spikes in electricity demand, including during the daily peak electrical load periods, which increases utility operating costs. For households using time-of-use metering (where electricity costs more during peak periods such as daytime, and is cheaper at night), a tankless electric heater may actually increase operating costs if the hot water is used during peak times. Instantaneous-type heaters are also problematic if they are connected to district heating systems, as they raise peak demands, and most utilities prefer all buildings to have hot water storage.
- Power outage: In case of a power outage, tankless heaters cannot supply hot water, unlike tank based heaters which can supply the hot water stored in the tank.
- LED Light Strobe effect: Most residential demand water heaters act by modulating the heating elements to match the flow rate. This is required to prevent overheating in the heating chamber. The resulting modulation of power being used has been known to cause "fluttering" in LED fixtures. Ordinary incandescent lamps are not similarly affected since the temperature of a tungsten element does not react to high-frequency modulations.

== See also ==
- Instant hot water dispenser
- Quooker
- Water heat recycling
