= Ijäs =

Ijäs is a Finnish surname. Notable people with the surname include:

- Janne Ijäs (born 1972), Finnish ice hockey player
- Matti Ijäs (born 1950), Finnish television and film director and screenwriter
