= Väyrynen =

Origin
- Language: Finnish
- Region of origin: Finland

Väyrynen is a surname originating in Finland.

== Geographical distribution ==
As of 2014, 92.3% of all known bearers of the surname Väyrynen were residents of Finland.

In Finland, the frequency of the surname was higher than national average (1:1,875) in the following regions:

1. Kainuu (1:251)
2. Northern Ostrobothnia (1:581)
3. North Karelia (1:593)
4. Lapland (1:1,409)
5. Northern Savonia (1:1,647)
6. South Karelia (1:1,856)

== People ==
Notable people with the surname include:

- Antero Väyrynen (1916–1970), Finnish civil servant and politician
- Janne Väyrynen (born 1992), Finnish ice hockey player
- Mika Väyrynen (born 1981), Finnish footballer
- Mika Väyrynen (musician) (born 1967), Finnish musician
- Paavo Väyrynen (born 1946), Finnish politician
- Tim Väyrynen (born 1993), Finnish footballer
- Vilho Väyrynen (1912–2000), Finnish lawyer and politician
- Waltteri Väyrynen (born 1994), Finnish drummer
