= Martikainen =

Martikainen is a Finnish surname. Notable people with the surname include:

- Janne Martikainen (1878–1934), Finnish politician
- Martta Martikainen-Ypyä (1904–1992), Finnish architect
- Olavi Martikainen (born 1941), Finnish farmer and politician
- Kari Martikainen (born 1968), Finnish professional ice hockey defenceman
- Jarkko Martikainen (born 1970), Finnish singer and songwriter
- Tommi Martikainen (born 1982), Finnish racing cyclist
