= Jannes =

Jannes is a Dutch and Low German masculine given name derived from Johannes. Jannes or Jamnes is also the name traditionally given to an Egyptian sorcerer mentioned without a name in the Book of Exodus.

- Jannes Horn (born 1997), German footballer
- Jannes Kirsten (born 1993), South African rugby player
- Jannes Pieter Mazure (1899–1990), Dutch Labour Party politician, President of the Senate
- Jannes Munneke (born 1949), Dutch rower
- Jannes Vansteenkiste (born 1993), Belgian footballer
- Jannes van der Wal (1956–1996), Dutch world champion draughts player

== See also ==
- Janne, given name in Nordic countries
- Joannes
