= Janne Reinikainen =

Janne Reinikainen may refer to:

- Janne Reinikainen (actor)
- Janne Reinikainen (footballer)
