= Jiri Evenhuis =

Dutch industrial designer in Singapore

Jiri Henri Evenhuis (born 3 February 1973) is a Dutch industrial designer, based in Singapore.

In 1999, Evenhuis invented the world's first 3D printed fabric, for which he became internationally known. In 2003, the Fashion Institute of Technology in New York included Evenhuis's 3D-printed textile in their collection. Samples of the fabric have been added to many collections around the world, most notably to the permanent collection of the MOMA (Museum Of Modern Art) in New York.

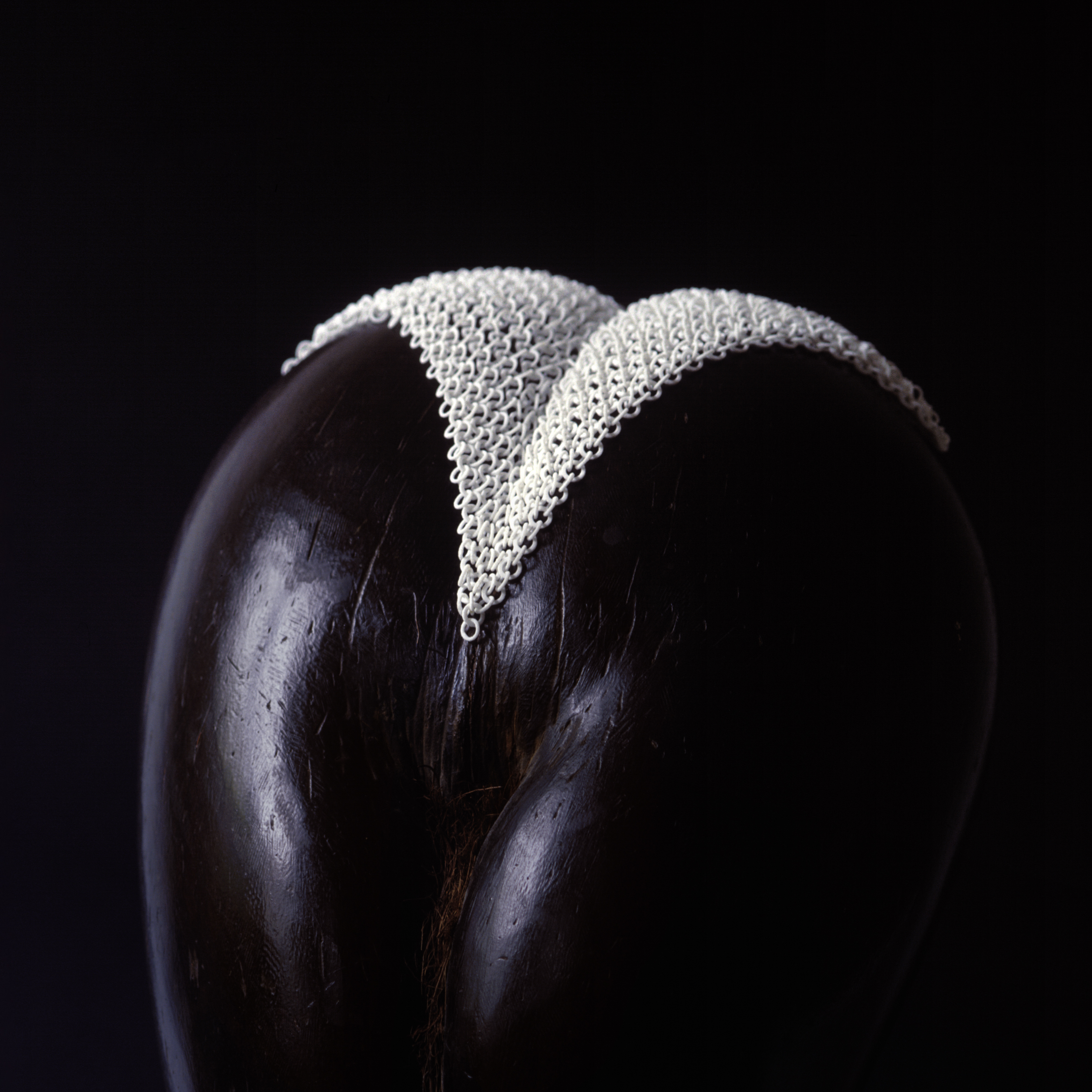
3d printed ring fabric sample displayed on a Coco de Mer.

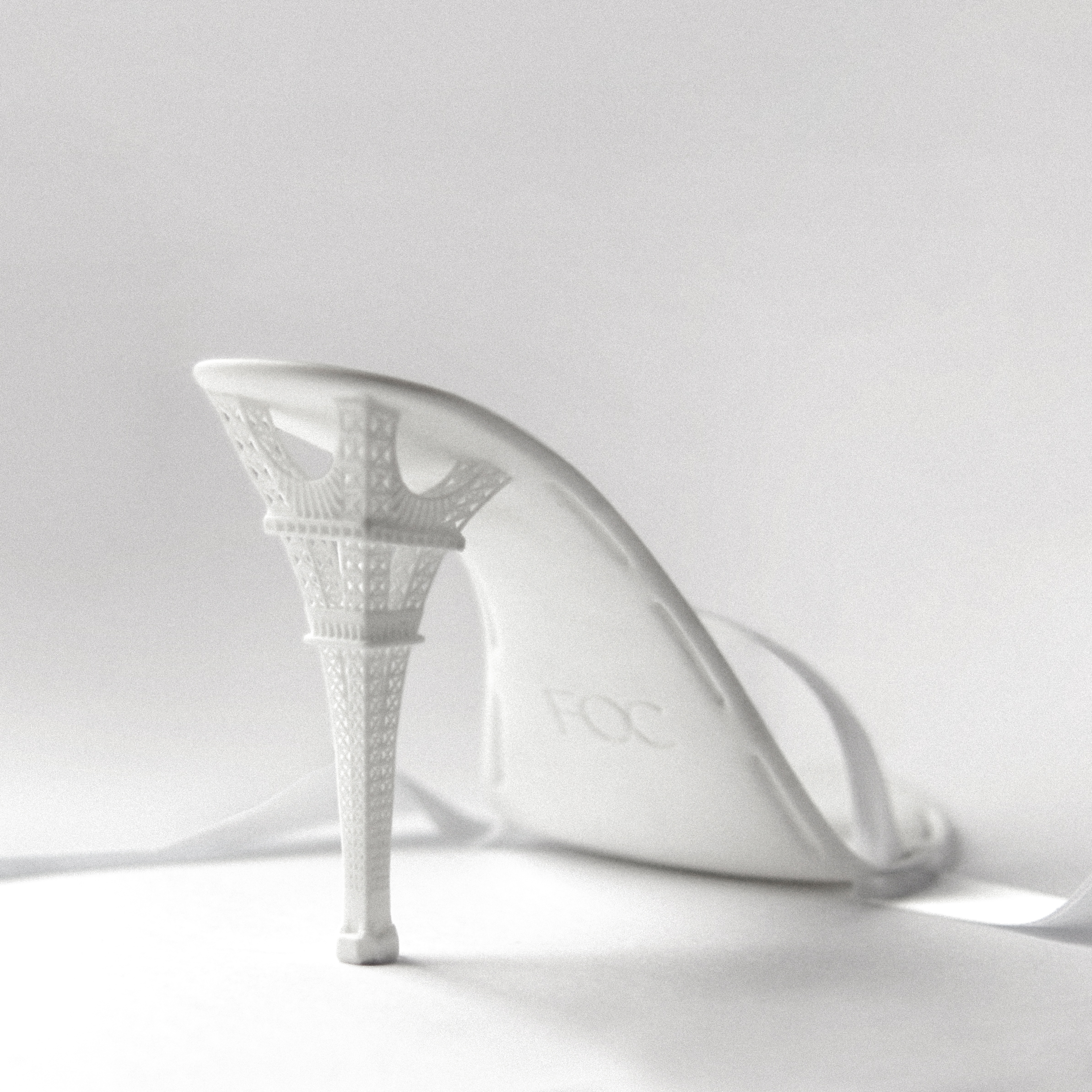
3D-printed stilettos for Paris exhibition 2005

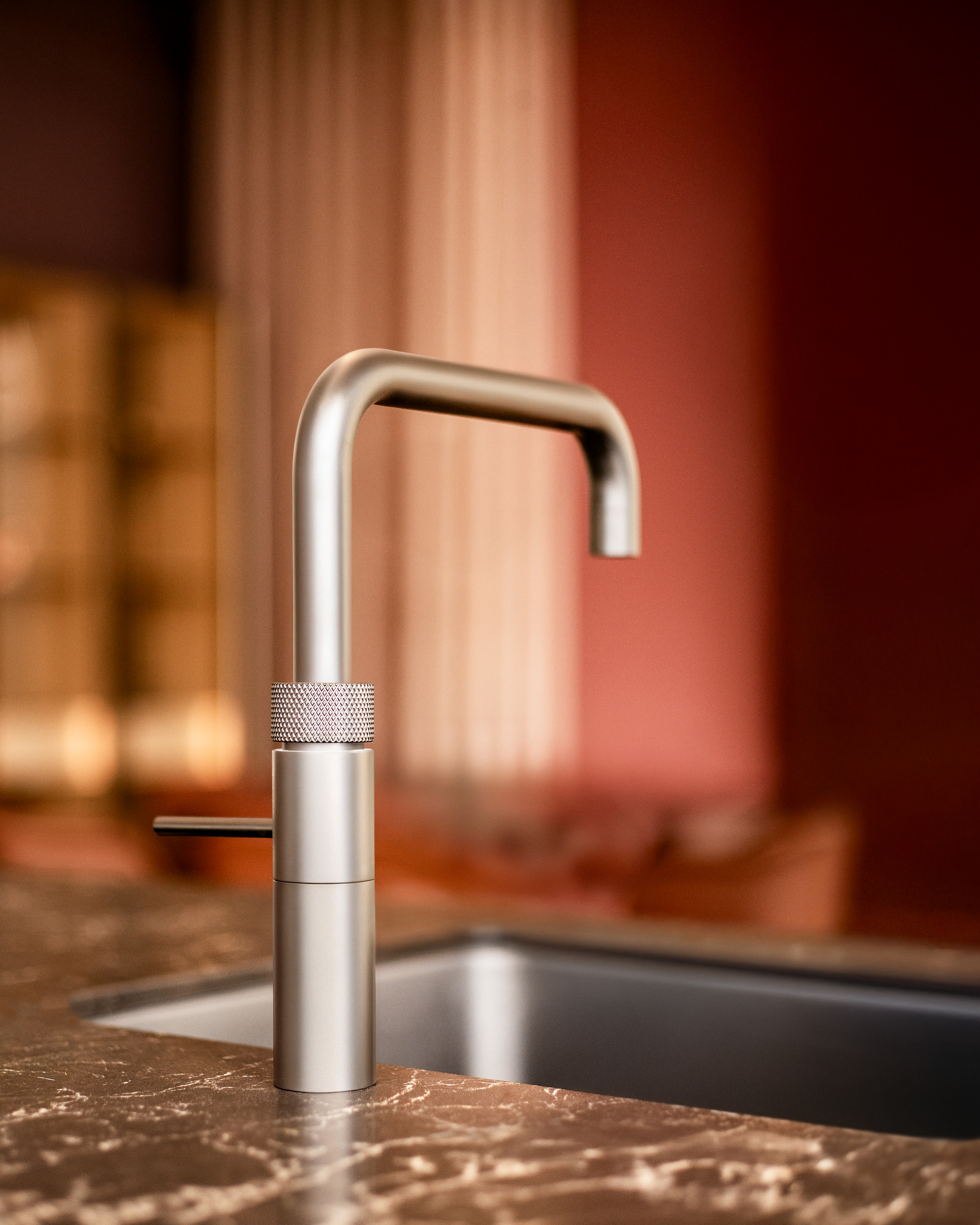
Quooker Fusion Square, 2012

== Life and education ==
Evenhuis was born in Amsterdam but spent part of his youth growing up in Los Angeles. In 1980, he returned to Amsterdam where he later attended the Gerrit Rietveld Academy and graduated in 2000. He moved to Singapore in 2014.

== Work ==
In 2000, Evenhuis co-founded Freedom of Creation (FOC) with Janne Kyttanen, a company that pioneered in 3D printed design. Through a co-operation with Materialise MGX, they created and commercialized the first rapid manufactured 3D products (lamps, shoes, bags and textiles).

In 2003, Freedom of Creation was one of the first to present a series of 3D-printed lights at the Salone del Mobile in Milan. For this, Freedom of Creation was heralded as the #1 exhibitor by Icon Magazine.

In 2004, Freedom of Creation was invited to exhibit at the Dyson showroom in Paris, for this event, Evenhuis designed the first 3D printed shoe ‘FOC Paris’.

In 2004, Evenhuis was artist-in-residence at the European Ceramic Work Centre.

In 2005, Evenhuis left Freedom of Creation to pursue his career as an independent designer. However, his work in 3D printing continued to be exhibited. In 2008, Freedom of Creation exhibited a piece called ‘Punchbag’ designed by Kyttanen and Evenhuis at the Museum of Modern Art in New York.

In 2008, Evenhuis began a close collaboration with Quooker, the inventors of the boiling water tap, designing a.o. their award-winning taps.

Since 2014, Evenhuis has been based in Singapore working as an independent designer for international clients. He is also leading several start-ups. He has a functional and minimalist approach to design. His conviction ‘form equals function’ defines his work.

== Recognition and awards ==
Evenhuis has won numerous awards throughout his career including Red Dot and Dutch Design Awards.

Over the course of his career, Evenhuis's work has appeared in countless publications, museums, galleries and exhibitions throughout the world. Venues include the Salone del Mobile Milano, 100% Design London, Dune New York, Maison et Objet Paris, FIT New York, MOMA New York and many others.
