= Storage water heater =

Thermodynamic device that uses energy to raise the temperature of water

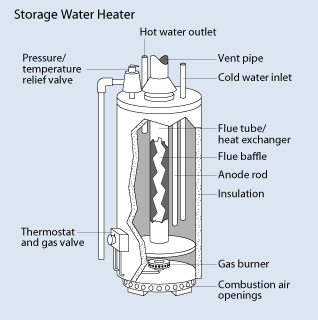
Diagram showing a natural gas storage water heater

A storage water heater, or a hot water system (HWS), or a hot water cylinder, is a domestic water heating appliance that uses a hot water storage tank to maximize water heating capacity and provide instantaneous delivery of hot water. Conventional storage water heaters may use a variety of energy sources, including electricity and fuels such as natural gas, propane or fuel oil. Less conventional water heating technologies, such as heat pump water heaters and solar water heaters, can also be categorized as storage water heaters.

== Difference between a storage heater and an instant heater ==
The primary difference between a storage heater and an instant heater is that a storage heater heats the water and stores it for later use, while an instant heater heats the water on demand.

Instant water heaters, as the name suggests, provide hot water almost instantaneously. There is hardly 1 or 2 minutes, and often only a few seconds, of heating time after which hot water can be accessed. These types of heaters have an average life period of 15-20 years. Instant water heaters provide hot water as you need, with less heat losses and often at a cheaper price than storage water heaters.

Storage heaters are not as fast as the instant versions, as they have to heat a tank of water that is then stored for later usage. Storage water heaters with large tanks can store about 75 U.S. gallons (280 L) and are popular due to their low upfront costs and long average life-span of 10-15 years. But these systems are the least energy efficient, making them expensive to run long-term. They also require more space for installation.

== Solar ==
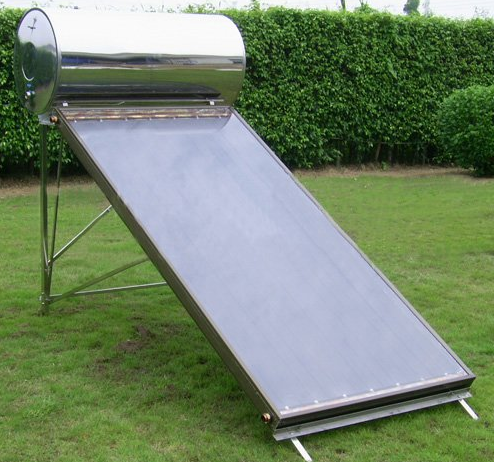
Photothermic modules (or solar heat flat panel collectors) are increasingly used.

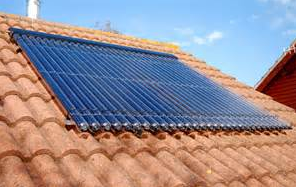
Solar vacuum tubes have poorer efficiency at 80°C but work better in cold and windy conditions.

Solar heat is clean and renewable. This is the most modern system. Increasingly, solar powered water heaters are being used. Their solar thermal collectors are installed outside dwellings, typically on the roof or walls or nearby, and the potable hot water storage tank is typically a pre-existing or new conventional water heater, or a water heater specifically designed for solar thermal.

The most basic solar thermal models are the direct-gain type, in which the potable water is directly sent into the collector. Many such systems are said to use integrated collector storage (ICS), as direct-gain systems typically have storage integrated within the collector. Heating water directly is inherently more efficient than heating it indirectly via heat exchangers, but such systems offer very limited freeze protection, if any, can easily heat water to temperatures unsafe for domestic use, and ICS systems suffer from severe heat loss on cold nights and cold, cloudy days.

By contrast, indirect or closed-loop systems do not allow potable water through the solar panels, but rather pump a heat transfer fluid (either water or a water/antifreeze mix) through the panels. After collecting heat in the panels, the heat transfer fluid flows through a heat exchanger, transferring its heat to the potable hot water. When the panels are cooler than the storage tank or when the storage tank has already reached its maximum temperature, the controller in closed-loop systems will stop the circulator pumps. In a drainback system, the water drains into a storage tank contained in conditioned or semi-conditioned space, protected from freezing temperatures. With antifreeze systems, however, the pump must be run if the panel temperature gets too hot (to prevent degradation of the antifreeze) or too cold (to prevent the water/antifreeze mixture from freezing.)

Flat panel collectors are typically used in closed-loop systems. Flat panels, which often resemble skylights, are the most durable type of collector, and they also have the best performance for systems designed for temperatures within 100 °F (38 °C) of ambient temperature. Flat panels are regularly used in both pure water and antifreeze systems.

Another type of solar collector is the evacuated tube collector, which are intended for cold climates that do not experience severe hail and/or applications where high temperatures are needed (i.e., over 200 °F (93 °C)). Placed in a rack, evacuated tube collectors form a row of glass tubes, each containing absorption fins attached to a central heat-conducting rod (copper or condensation-driven). The evacuated description refers to the vacuum created in the glass tubes during the manufacturing process, which results in very low heat loss and lets evacuated tube systems achieve extreme temperatures, far in excess of water's boiling point.

== Fossil fuel fired water heaters ==
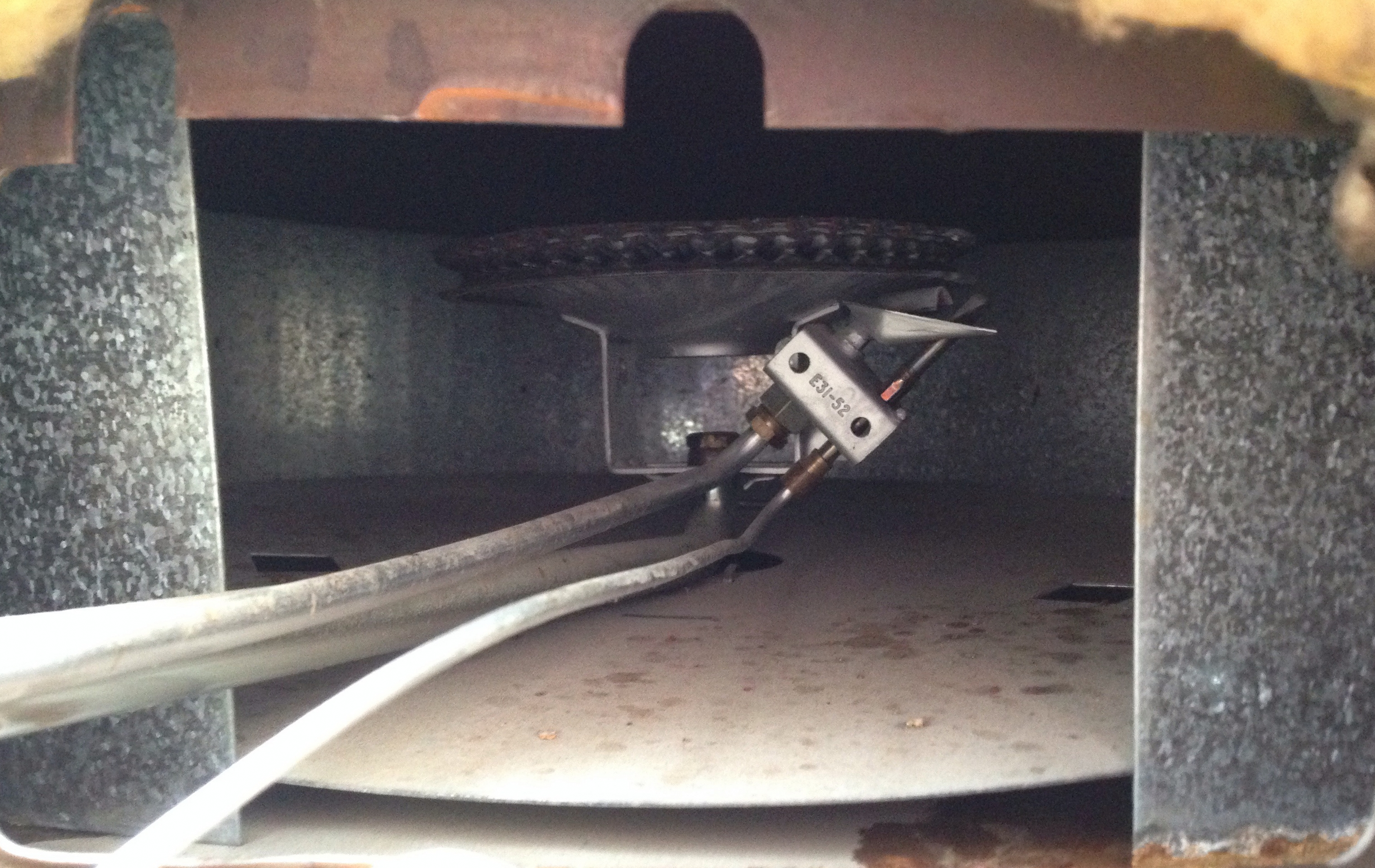
Burner assembly of a gas-fired water heater

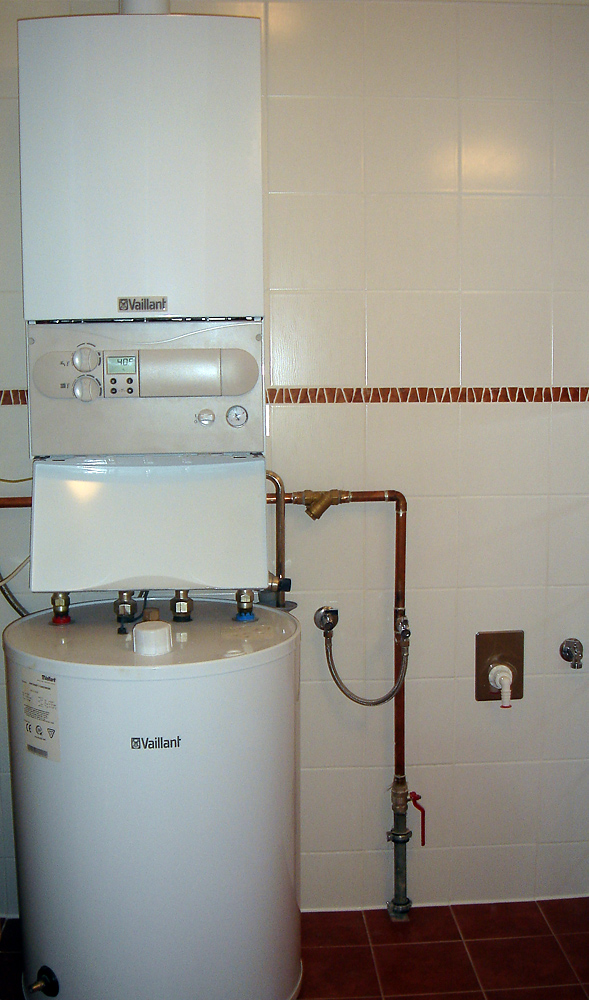
Gas furnace (top) and storage water heater (bottom) (Germany)

Natural gas and propane storage water heaters operate identically with a gas or propane burner located at the bottom of the storage tank heating the water. Fuel oil fired storage water heaters are configured similarly by igniting a vaporizing mist of oil and air with an electric spark.

Emissions from fossil fuel fired water heaters are expelled using a variety of venting technologies. Atmospheric vented systems use room air as combustion air and exhaust air. The exhaust air is expelled through the exhaust flue by buoyancy forces resulting from the combustion. Power vent models operate similarly to atmospheric vent systems, but an exhaust fan is added to aid in the expulsion of combustion gases. Direct vent systems do not use room air for combustion; instead, buoyancy forces air from the outside through the water heater combustion system and finally exhausts the combustion gases to the outside. Powered direct-vent systems include an exhaust fan to aid in the expulsion of combustion gasses.

== Electric water heaters ==
First invented by Carter W. Adams, most electric water heaters use electric resistance elements to heat the water in the storage tank. A two-element electric water heater has one element at the top of the storage tank, and one element at the bottom. Each element is controlled by an independent thermostat. The lower element provides recovery from standby losses, and the upper element provides extra heating when a lot of hot water is being used. Some heaters contain only a lower element.

Electrical water heaters that store hot water can be a good match for a smart grid, so that it heats when the electrical grid load is low and turns off when the load is high. This could be implemented by allowing the power supplier to send loadshedding requests, or by the use of real-time energy pricing. See Economy 7.

Heat pump water heaters use an air source heat pump to transfer thermal energy from the air around the unit into the storage tank. Electric resistance element(s) are typically included to provide backup heating if the heat pump cannot provide sufficient heating capacity.

== Wood ==
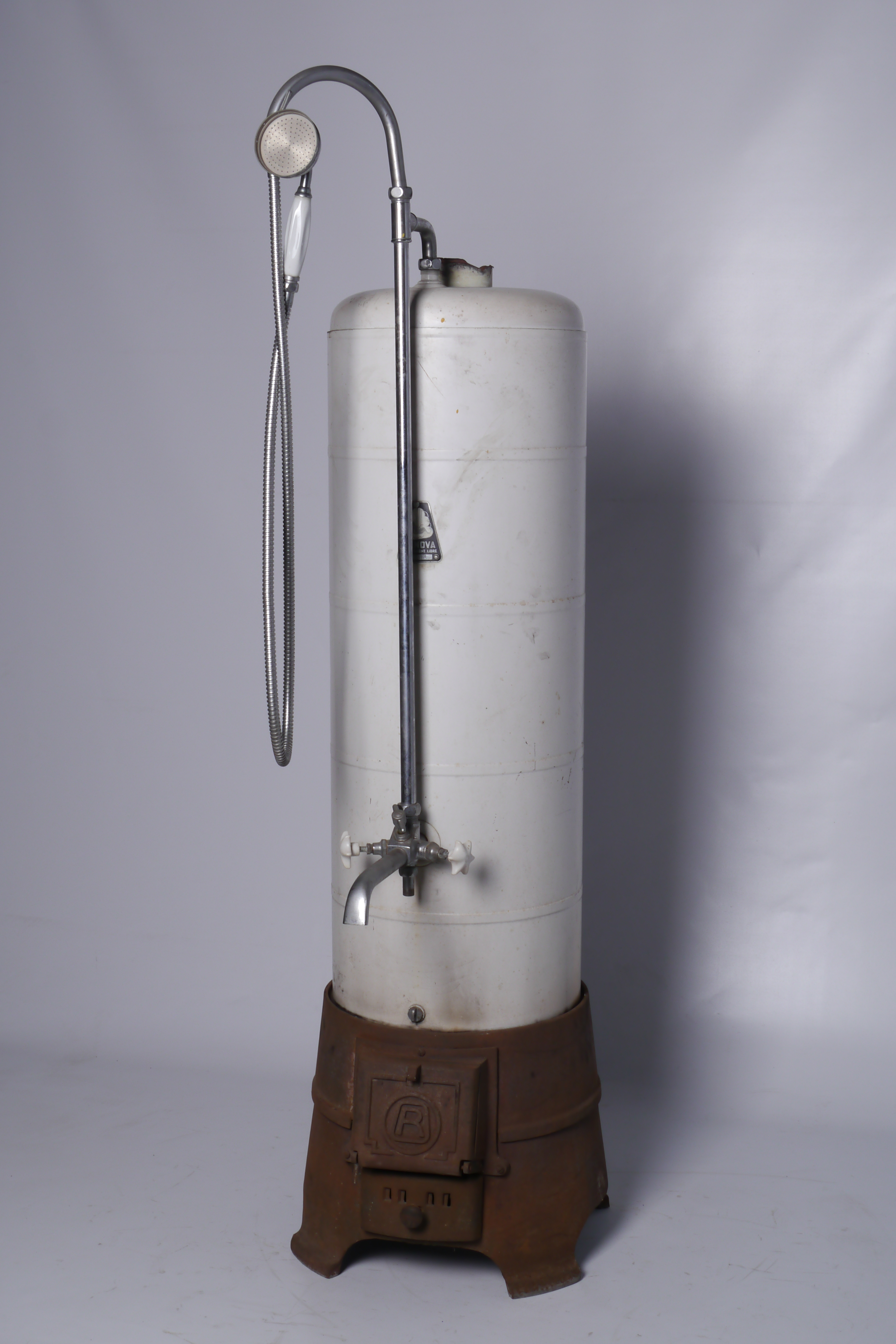
Coal-fired boiler from the brand Renova | Collection Museum of Industry Ghent

As with fossil fuels, burning wood causes greenhouse effect gases. However, wood is a renewable source of energy. A sustainable heat system would be to use solar heat in the summer, and the minimum of wood in the winter.

== Corrosion and its prevention ==
The storage tanks of water heaters are usually made out of steel with a lining of glass inside them. Water will corrode exposed steel, so the glass lining prevents or delays corrosion.

The tanks also have aluminum or magnesium anode rods, or impressed current titanium anodes used in cathodic protection systems. The anode rod will slow down corrosion of the steel tank by corroding in its place. When the anode rod is completely corroded, the steel tank will corrode much faster.

Given the constant contact of water, corrosion eventually happens anyway. If corrosion of the tank creates holes in it, there are some temporary fixes to try to patch it, but the long-term solution is to replace the tank altogether.

Water with a lower pH value will corrode the anode rods and steel tank faster. For proper maintenance of the tank, know the pH level of the water stored, watch for corrosion of the anode rod, and replace the anode when it becomes too corroded.

== See also ==
- Tankless water heating
