= Evenhuis =

Evenhuis is a surname. Notable people with the surname include:

- Gertie Evenhuis (1927–2005), Dutch writer
- Neal Evenhuis (born 1952), American entomologist
- Jiri Evenhuis (born 1973), Dutch industrial designer
