= Janne Oinas =

Finnish footballer (born 1973)

Personal information
- Full name: Janne Oinas
- Date of birth: 27 November 1973 (age 52)
- Place of birth: Turku, Finland
- Height: 1.81 m (5 ft 11 in)
- Position: Defender

Senior career*
Years	Team	Apps	(Gls)
1993–1996	TPS	89	(0)
1995	→ Örebro SK (loan)	4	(1)
1997	Lelle SK	8	(0)
1998	FC Flora	11	(1)
1998	Kjelsas Oslo	12	(0)
1999–2004	FC Inter Turku	115	(6)

International career^{‡}
1998	Finland	2	(0)
- * Club domestic league appearances and goals as of 13 July 2008 ‡ National team caps and goals as of 13 July 2008

Janne Oinas (born 27 November 1973) is a Finnish former footballer. He played the position of defender and was a member of the Finland national football team.
