= Janne Wallenius =

Swedish reactor physicist (born 1968)

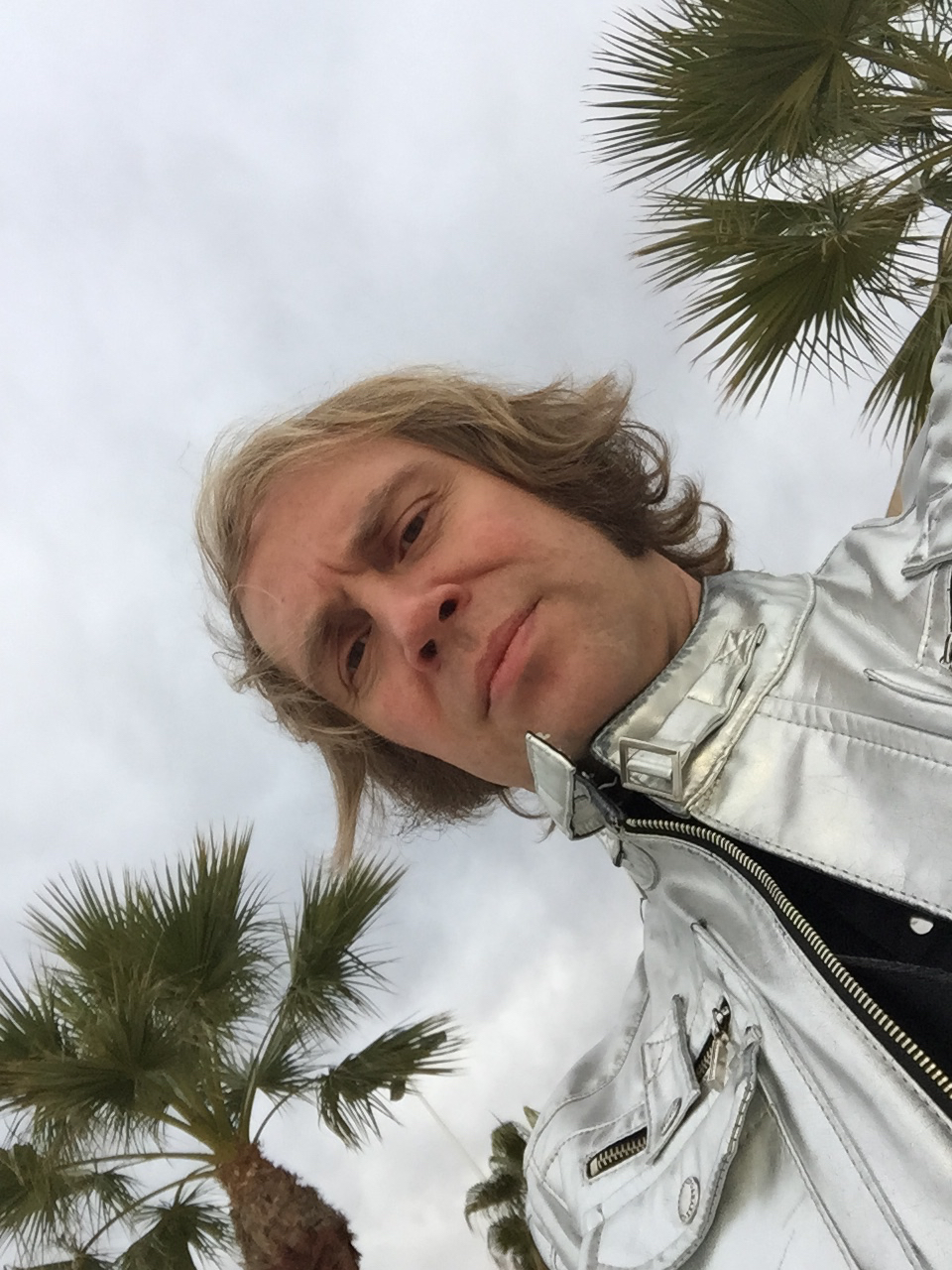
Janne Wallenius, February 2015.

Janne Wallenius is a Swedish reactor physicist. He is a professor at the Royal Institute of Technology (KTH) in Stockholm, Sweden.

Wallenius was born in 1968 in Trollhättan, Sweden. At the age of 18, he won the particle physics contest on the Swedish television show "Kvitt eller dubbelt" (Double or Nothing), after which he was nicknamed "partikel-Janne". He studied Engineering Physics at Chalmers University of Technology in Gothenburg from 1987 to 1992. He got his PhD degree in Quantum Chemistry from Uppsala University in 1996.

In 2008 he was promoted to full professor at KTH.

In 2013, he co-founded the company Blykalla ("Lead Cold") which designs small lead-cooled fast reactors called SEALER intended for commercial power production in arctic communities. Blykalla has been listed as one of the 71 hottest start-ups in Sweden.

In 2016 Wallenius appointed one of Sweden's 10 most innovative entrepreneurs by Foundation ÅForsk and Swedish Incubators & Science Parks.

In 2022, Janne Wallenius received the KTH Innovation Award, that aims to celebrate people from KTH who with creativity, grit and courage have contributed to solving society’s challenges with their innovations. The monetary award is 500 000 SEK.
