= Anton Stråka =

Finnish ice hockey player

- Born: 6 April 1998 (age 27); Nykarleby, Finland
- Height: 6 ft 3 in (191 cm)
- Weight: 205 lb (93 kg; 14 st 9 lb)
- Position: Centre
- Shoots: Left
- Liiga team Former teams: JYP Jyväskylä; Dornbirn Bulldogs
- Playing career: 2016–present

Anton Stråka (born 6 April 1998) is a Finnish professional ice hockey player who is currently contracted as a centre for JYP Jyväskylä of the Liiga.

== Playing career ==
He originally played as a youth and made his professional debut with JYP Jyväskylä of the Liiga.

After three parts seasons in the Finnish Liiga, Stråka left out of contract and moved to the Austrian Hockey League, agreeing to a one-year contract with the Dornbirn Bulldogs on 1 September 2020.

He returned Finland after the completion of his contract with Dornbirn on 8 July 2021.
