= Janne Öfverström =

Finnish ice hockey player

- Born: March 18, 1991 (age 34); Helsinki, Finland
- Height: 6 ft 3 in (191 cm)
- Weight: 207 lb (94 kg; 14 st 11 lb)
- Position: Forward
- Shoots: Left
- Liiga team (P) Cur. team: HIFK; HC Keski-Uusimaa (Mestis)
- NHL draft: Undrafted
- Playing career: 2012–present

Janne Ofverstrom (born March 18, 1991) is a Finnish ice hockey player. He is currently playing with HC Keski-Uusimaa in the Finnish Mestis.

Ofverstrom made his Liiga debut playing with HIFK during the 2013–14 Liiga season.
