= Janne Koponen =

Finnish ice hockey defenceman

- Born: June 7, 1995 (age 29); Kuopio, Finland
- Height: 6 ft 2 in (188 cm)
- Weight: 203 lb (92 kg; 14 st 7 lb)
- Position: Defence
- Shoots: Left
- team Former teams: IPK; KalPa
- Playing career: 2017–present

Janne Koponen (born June 7, 1995) is a Finnish ice hockey defenceman currently playing for IPK of the Mestis.

Koponen previously played eleven games for KalPa during the 2016–17 Liiga season before joining IPK in 2017.

== Career statistics ==
			Regular season					Playoffs
Season	Team	League	GP	G	A	Pts	PIM	GP	G	A	Pts	PIM
2013–14	KalPa	Jr. A	44	2	9	11	44	-	-	-	-	-
2014–15	KalPa	Jr. A	36	3	13	16	28	-	-	-	-	-
2015–16	KalPa	Jr. A	43	11	18	29	54	9	0	3	3	6
2016–17	KalPa	Jr. A	46	9	24	33	30	3	2	1	3	4
2016–17	KalPa	Liiga	7	0	0	0	0	4	0	0	0	0
2017–18	IPK	Mestis	49	0	7	7	46	6	0	1	1	4
2018–19	IPK	Mestis	50	2	7	9	34	-	-	-	-	-
Liiga totals			7	0	0	0	0	4	0	0	0	0
