= Janne Korhonen (taekwondo) =

Finnish taekwondo practitioner (1970–2023)

Janne Korhonen (30 March 1970 – 30 June 2023) was a Finnish taekwondo athlete. He was 195 cm (6 ft 4 3/4 in) high; 120 kg (260 lb; 18 st 13 lb); reach 206 cm (6 ft 9 in). He used to compete in the International Taekwon-Do Federation's (ITF) competitions. His best achievements were three personal European Championship gold medals in 1992, 1993 and 1999.

Born in Oulu, Korhonen started to train athletics and cross-country skiing at an early age. He started combat sports at the age of 12. After a few years of karate, he started taekwondo. After being promoted as a black belt in 1991, he debuted in the national team of his native country. His competitive career in taekwondo lasted from 1988 to 1999. During that period of time, he participated in European Championships five times and World Championships twice, among other international and national competitions.

Korhonen also cross-trained multiple other sports to improve his performance in taekwondo. On field, for example, he threw 2 kg discus 58.32 m, and on track, he ran 100 m in 11.2 seconds. His standing long jump peaked at 340 cm and power clean at 190 kg. His instructor on the early years of training was Grand Master Fikret Güler, 9. dan.

Korhonen was a medical doctor by profession. He died in Oulu on 30 June 2023, aged 53.

== See also ==
- Korean martial arts
- Taekwon-Do
- International Taekwondo Federation
