= Janne Leskinen =

Finnish alpine skier (born 1971)

Janne Leskinen (born 24 July 1971 in Kuopio) is a Finnish retired alpine skier who competed in the 1994 Winter Olympics.
