= Janne Kyttanen =

Finnish conceptual artist and designer

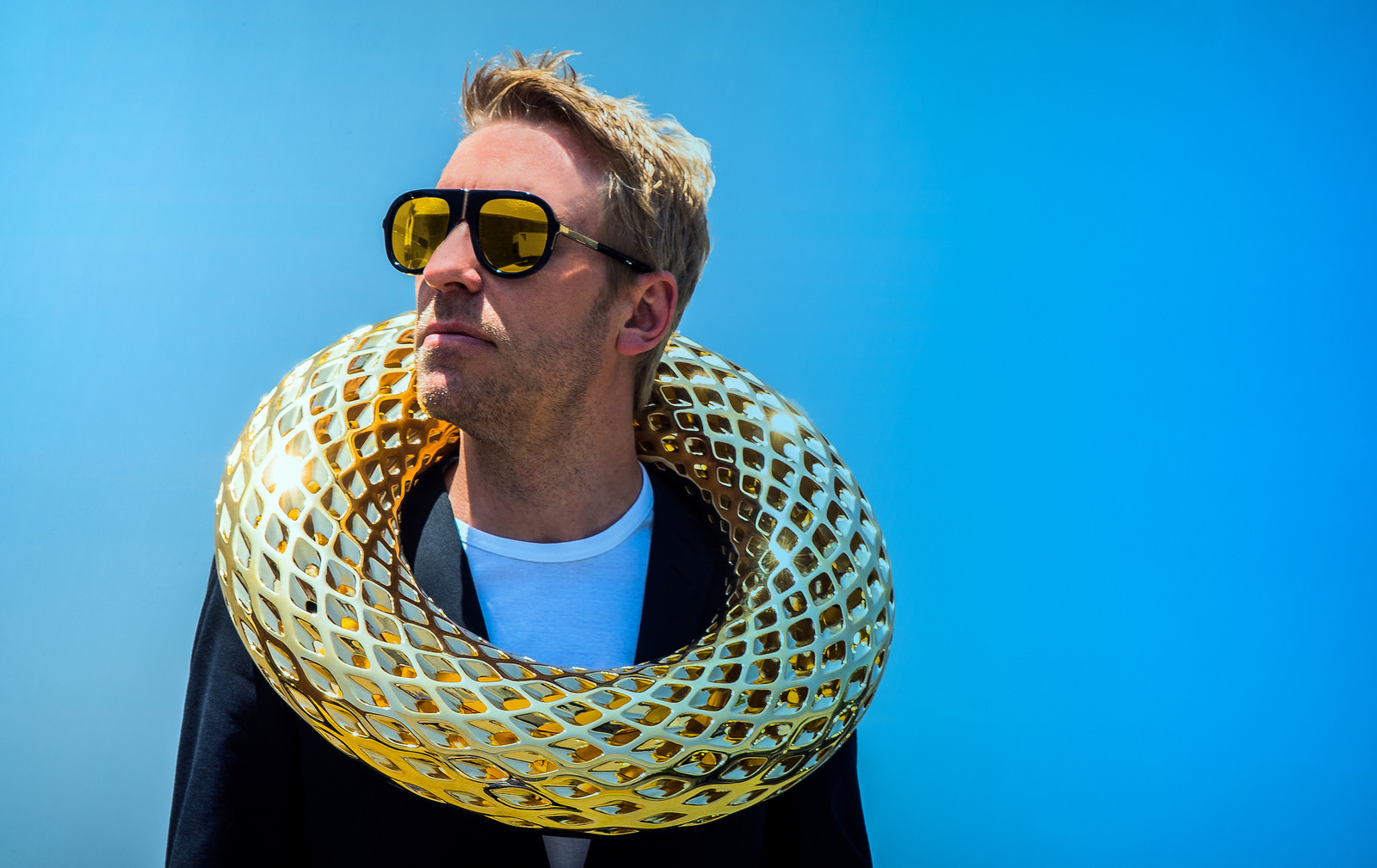
- Born: 1974 (age 51–52); Hämeenlinna, Finland
- Education: Gerrit Rietveld Academie ('00)
- Occupations: Designer; Conceptual artist
- Organization: What The Future Venture Capital
- Known for: Design for 3D printing
- Website: Official Website

Janne Kyttanen (born 1974) is a Finnish conceptual artist, designer, entrepreneur and investor who is best known for his work in design for 3D printing. He was the founder of Freedom of Creation, a pioneering agency that specialised in design for 3D printing. In 2011 Freedom of Creation was acquired by 3D Systems, an American-based manufacturer of 3D printers. He held the position of Creative Director at 3D Systems for four years. His work been exhibited in numerous museums and galleries, including the Stedelijk Museum, the Museum of Modern Art, and at Design Miami, the global forum for design. His work is represented by Gallery All. He also used to be a professional squash player, having played in two individual world championships and two team championships.

== Early life and education ==
Kyttanen was born in 1974 in Hämeenlinna, Finland. He attended Escola de Disseny (School of Design), Elisave in Barcelona, Spain in 1996. He graduated from the Gerrit Rietveld Academie in Amsterdam in 2000 and worked with design for 3D printing during his studies. His earliest work included a collection of 3D printed lamps.

== Career ==
In 2000, Kyttanen co-founded Freedom of Creation with Jiri Evenhuis, a design studio that specialised in design for 3D printing. The studio was one of the first to experiment with 3D printed designs and presented a series of 3D-printed lights at Expo Milano in 2003. Based on the invention of Jiri Evenhuis to 3D print fabric; Evenhuis and Kyttanen were also the first to employ rapid prototyping technology to produce textiles. The first 3D-printed textile to appear in the Fashion Institute of Technology's museum is a piece by Kyttanen and Evenhuis. In 2008, Freedom of Creation exhibited a piece called "Punchbag Handbag" designed by Kyttanen and Jiri Evenhuis at the Museum of Modern Art in New York City.

In 2011, Freedom of Creation was acquired by 3D Systems, a South Carolina-based manufacturer of 3D printers. Kyttanen became the Creative Director of the company that same year. In collaboration with 3D Systems, Kyttanen has produced a collection of new designs and 3D-printed objects. In 2013, he designed a collection of 3D-printed technology accessories including mobile phone and tablet cases. Also in 2013, Kyttanen designed a collection of 3D-printed shoes. In 2014, he designed a 3D-printed "Orchid Cloud" in celebration of the "International Day of the Orchid." In 2015, he designed a 3D-printed sofa (called "Sofa So Good") using 2.5 liters of resin material. The sofa tests the limits of weight reduction, weighing only 2.5 kilograms (5 pounds) and was exhibited at the 2015 Consumer Electronics Show.

In 2016 Kyttanen left 3D Systems and founded a venture capital fund that will design and launch new companies at the speed of launching new products. What The Future Venture Capital is based in Los Angeles and will specialise in creating companies that unite tech and design and that utilise technologies including 3D printing, virtual reality, augmented reality, machine learning and artificial intelligence.

In 2017 Kyttanen launched Pixsweet, a platform that combines intuitive software with a proprietary production process to enable users to create custom ice pops in just a few clicks. The platform has been described as the first truly scalable mass customization consumer product, powered by 3D printing. Technology press have described Pixsweet as "maybe the best use of technology, ever" and have predicted that Pixsweet could "change the face of confectionary forever".

Over the course of his career, Kyttanen's work has appeared in numerous museums, galleries and fairs and exhibitions throughout the world. These venues include the Museum of Modern Art, the Museum of Arts and Design, the Vitra Design Museum, the Stedelijk Museum, the Museum at the Fashion Institute of Technology, Design Miami, and many others.

Kyttanen is an inventor and has been awarded several patents including: a three dimensional printer frame, moulding process, process for producing a UV cured 3D product, and casting process to make a metal 3D product.

== Recognition and awards ==
Kyttanen and his work have won numerous awards throughout his career. In 2005, his Lily.MGX lamp design won a Red Dot Design Award. In 2007, the Design Forum Finland named Kyttanen the "Young Designer of the Year."
