= Janne Katosalmi =

Finnish ice hockey player

- Born: March 4, 1994 (age 31); Lapinlahti, Finland
- Height: 5 ft 7 in (170 cm)
- Weight: 163 lb (74 kg; 11 st 9 lb)
- Position: Right wing
- Shoots: Right
- Liiga team (P) Cur. team: KalPa; IPK (Mestis)
- Playing career: 2012–present

Janne Katosalmi (born March 4, 1994) is a Finnish professional ice hockey right winger. He is currently contracted to KalPa of the Finnish Liiga and is playing in Mestis for IPK.

Katosalmi made his Liiga debut for KalPa during the 2013–14 season where he played five regular season games.
