= Janne Martikainen =

Finnish politician

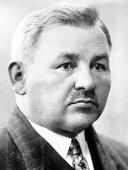
- Janne Martikainen

Member of the Parliament of Finland
- In office 1907–1909

Personal details
- Born: 24 March 1878 Kuopio, Finland
- Died: 11 July 1934 (aged 56)
- Party: Social Democratic Party of Finland (SDP)

Janne Martikainen (24 March 1878 – 11 July 1934) was a Finnish politician, born in Kuopio. He was a Member of the Parliament of Finland from 1907 to 1909, representing the Social Democratic Party of Finland (SDP).
