= Janne Kettunen =

Finnish ice hockey player

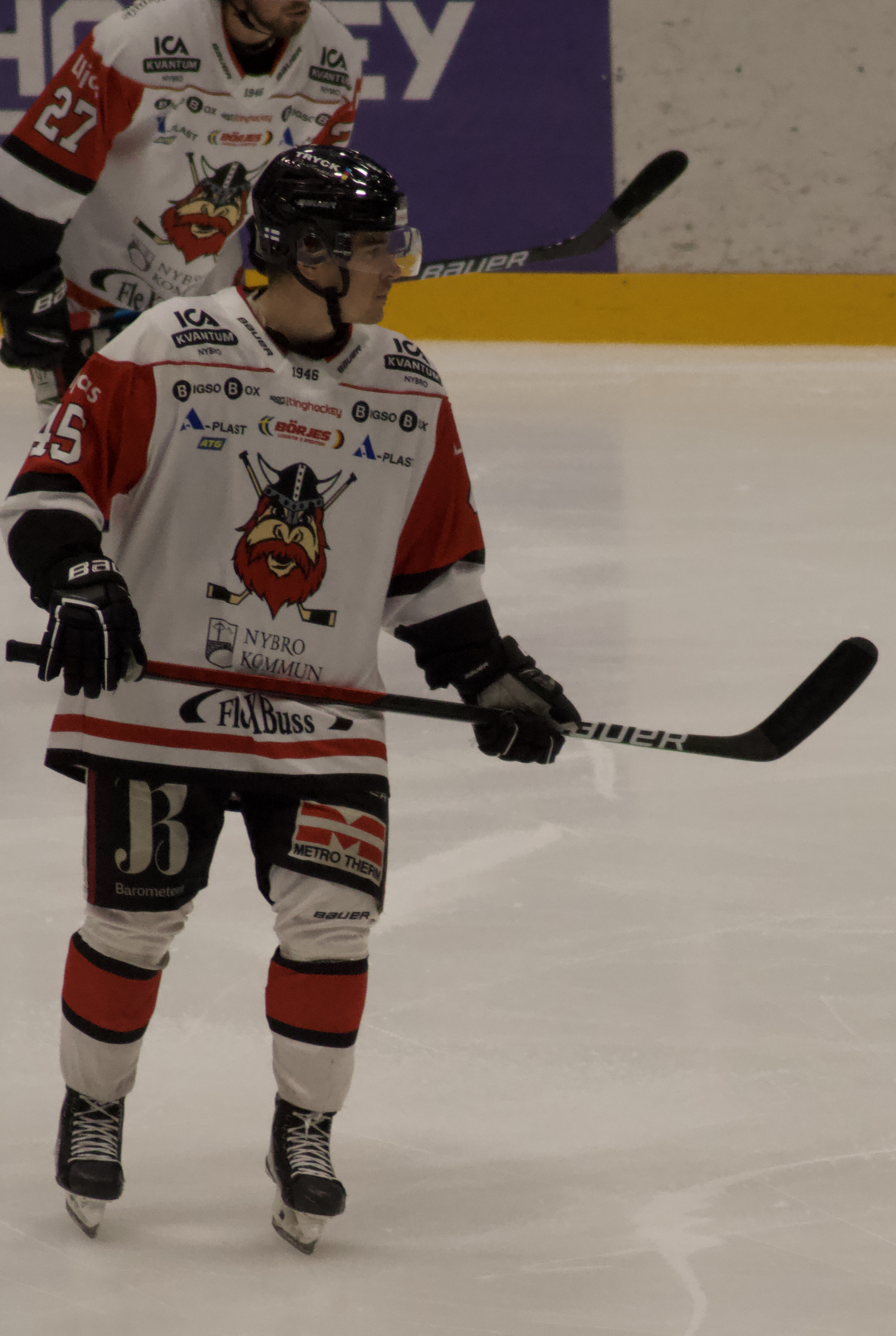
- Born: August 11, 1994 (age 32) Lappeenranta, Finland
- Height: 5 ft 9 in (175 cm)
- Weight: 181 lb (82 kg; 12 st 13 lb)
- Position: Forward
- Shoots: Left
- HockeyEttan team Former teams: Nybro IF; SaiPa; RoKi; HK Dukla Trenčín
- NHL draft: Undrafted
- Playing career: 2015–present

Janne Kettunen (born August 11, 1994) is a Finnish professional ice hockey player who currently plays with Nybro IF of the HockeyEttan.

== Career ==
Kettunen made his Liiga debut playing with SaiPa during the 2015-16 Liiga season.

== Career statistics ==
=== Regular season and playoffs ===
			Regular season					Playoffs
Season	Team	League	GP	G	A	Pts	PIM	GP	G	A	Pts	PIM
