= Janne Ijäs =

Finnish ice hockey centre

- Born: 2 August 1972 (age 52); Hämeenlinna, Finland
- Height: 5 ft 8 in (173 cm)
- Weight: 172 lb (78 kg; 12 st 4 lb)
- Position: Centre
- Shot: Right
- Played for: HPK; Brest Albatros Hockey
- Playing career: 1991–2005

Janne Ijäs (Finnish pronunciation: [ˈjɑnːe ˈijæs] born 2 August 1972) is a Finnish former professional ice hockey centre.

Ijäs played eleven games in the SM-liiga for HPK and scored one assist. He also spent six seasons in France playing for Brest Albatros Hockey.

== Career statistics ==
			Regular season					Playoffs
Season	Team	League	GP	G	A	Pts	PIM	GP	G	A	Pts	PIM
1989–90	HPK U20	Jr. A I-divisioona	1	0	0	0	0	—	—	—	—	—
1990–91	HPK U20	Jr. A I-divisioona	14	13	5	18	10	14	12	5	17	10
1991–92	HPK U20	Jr. A SM-sarja	22	13	9	22	16	—	—	—	—	—
1991–92	HPK	SM-liiga	3	0	0	0	0	—	—	—	—	—
1992–93	HPK U20	U20 SM-liiga	21	7	12	19	28	—	—	—	—	—
1992–93	HPK	SM-liiga	7	0	1	1	0	—	—	—	—	—
1992–93	Junkkarit HT	I-Divisioona	2	1	0	1	0	—	—	—	—	—
1993–94	FPS	I-Divisioona	36	11	15	26	14	—	—	—	—	—
1993–94	Junkkarit HT	I-Divisioona	3	0	0	0	0	—	—	—	—	—
1994–95	FPS	I-Divisioona	44	18	24	42	34	—	—	—	—	—
1995–96	Ahmat Hyvinkää	2. Divisioona	27	34	24	58	20	15	11	15	26	16
1996–97	Ahmat Hyvinkää	I-Divisioona	39	13	14	27	20	—	—	—	—	—
1997–98	Ahmat Hyvinkää	I-Divisioona	29	5	6	11	18	—	—	—	—	—
1998–99	Brest Albatros Hockey	France3	—	26	28	54	—	—	—	—	—	—
1999–00	Brest Albatros Hockey	France2	32	18	24	42	—	—	—	—	—	—
2000–01	Brest Albatros Hockey	France3	—	—	—	—	—	—	—	—	—	—
2001–02	Brest Albatros Hockey	France3	—	—	—	—	—	—	—	—	—	—
2002–03	Brest Albatros Hockey	France	27	8	3	11	18	—	—	—	—	—
2003–04	Brest Albatros Hockey	France	26	6	9	15	47	8	2	1	3	16
2004–05	Ahmat Hyvinkää	Suomi-sarja	18	10	7	17	18	—	—	—	—	—
SM-liiga totals			10	0	1	1	0	—	—	—	—	—
I-Divisioona totals			153	48	59	107	86	—	—	—	—	—
