= Janne Väyrynen =

Finnish ice hockey player (born 1992)

- Born: 26 June 1992 (age 34) Järvenpää, Finland
- Height: 6 ft 3 in (191 cm)
- Weight: 203 lb (92 kg; 14 st 7 lb)
- Position: Winger
- Shoots: Right
- team Former teams: Free agent Lukko; HK Dukla Trenčín
- Playing career: 2013–present

Janne Väyrynen (born 26 June 1992) is a Finnish professional ice hockey winger.

Väyrynen previously played in Mestis for Jukurit, Kiekko-Vantaa and Jokipojat before signing for Lukko on 22 April 2016. He played thirteen games for the team over two seasons and registered two assists while also playing on loan for KeuPa HT of Mestis.

Väyrynen rejoined for Jokipojat on 4 May 2018. He then returned to KeuPa HT as a permanent member on 17 August 2019. On 8 October 2020 Väyrynen moved to Slovakia and signed for HK Dukla Trenčín of the Tipos Extraliga.

Since the 2020/2021 season, he has been playing for Swedish club Nybro Vikings IF in Hockeyettan and from the next season in Hockeyallsvenskan as the club was promoted.
