= Quooker =

Dutch water tap manufacturing company

- Founded: 1987
- Founder: Henri Peteri; Niels Peteri
- Successor: Niels Peteri (Bestuursvoorzitter|CEO); Walter Peteri (Bestuursvoorzitter|CEO)
- Headquarters: Staalstraat 1; 2984 AJ Ridderkerk, The Netherlands
- Products: Boiling water tap, kitchen tap, integrated heating elements (kitchen), chilled water tap, carbonated water tap
- Number of employees: 450 (2021)
- Parent: Quooker B.V.
- Website: Quooker

Quooker is a company from the Netherlands that manufactures mixing taps with integrated heating elements (instant boiling water dispensers), as well as soap dispensers, water filters and water softeners for removal of minerals from hard water. The company was founded in 1987 by Henri Peteri and his son Niels Peteri. The company holds several patents on both the boiling water tap and other products. Quooker is currently active in 16 different countries as of 2023, and has more than 400 employees. All products are manufactured at their 11,000-square-meter (120,000 sq ft) factory in Ridderkerk, the Netherlands.

== History ==
In 1970, the Dutch physicist Henri Peteri came up with the idea of a water tap with an integrated water heater while working at Unilever. In 1972, he was awarded a patent for the invention. In 1985, Henri was joined by his son Niels Peteri, and on 1 September 1987, they founded the company Henri Peteri B.V., the brand name 'Quooker' was later created by Niels.

The first boiling water tap was launched on the market by Niels in 1992. In 1993, Henri's other son Walter Peteri also joined the company. The first vacuum-insulated boiler in the world was brought onto the market by Quooker in the year 2000. From this point on, the boiling water tap started growing within the Netherlands. In 2004, the first batch of Quookers was exported abroad. Denmark and United Kingdom were the first countries to become acquainted with the Quooker systems.

The current factory in Ridderkerk was bought in 1995, and has been expanded during the years. Due to the growth of the sales, the head office was expanded considerably in 2015.

In 2007, Henri Peteri died, and since then the brothers Niels and Walter Peteri run the company together. The Twintaps were introduced in 2010, and consist of a boiling water tap and mixer tap in the same design. In 2012, the very first all-in-one tap was introduced to the market, with both boiling and cold water coming from the same tap.

In 2017, the Quooker Flex was awarded a Dutch Design Award. The Quooker Flex brought a new function to the table, namely a flexible extension hose for hot and cold water. The Quooker Cube was introduced in 2019, which means that the Quooker tap can now also facilitate chilled and sparkling water, all from one tap.

== Milestones ==
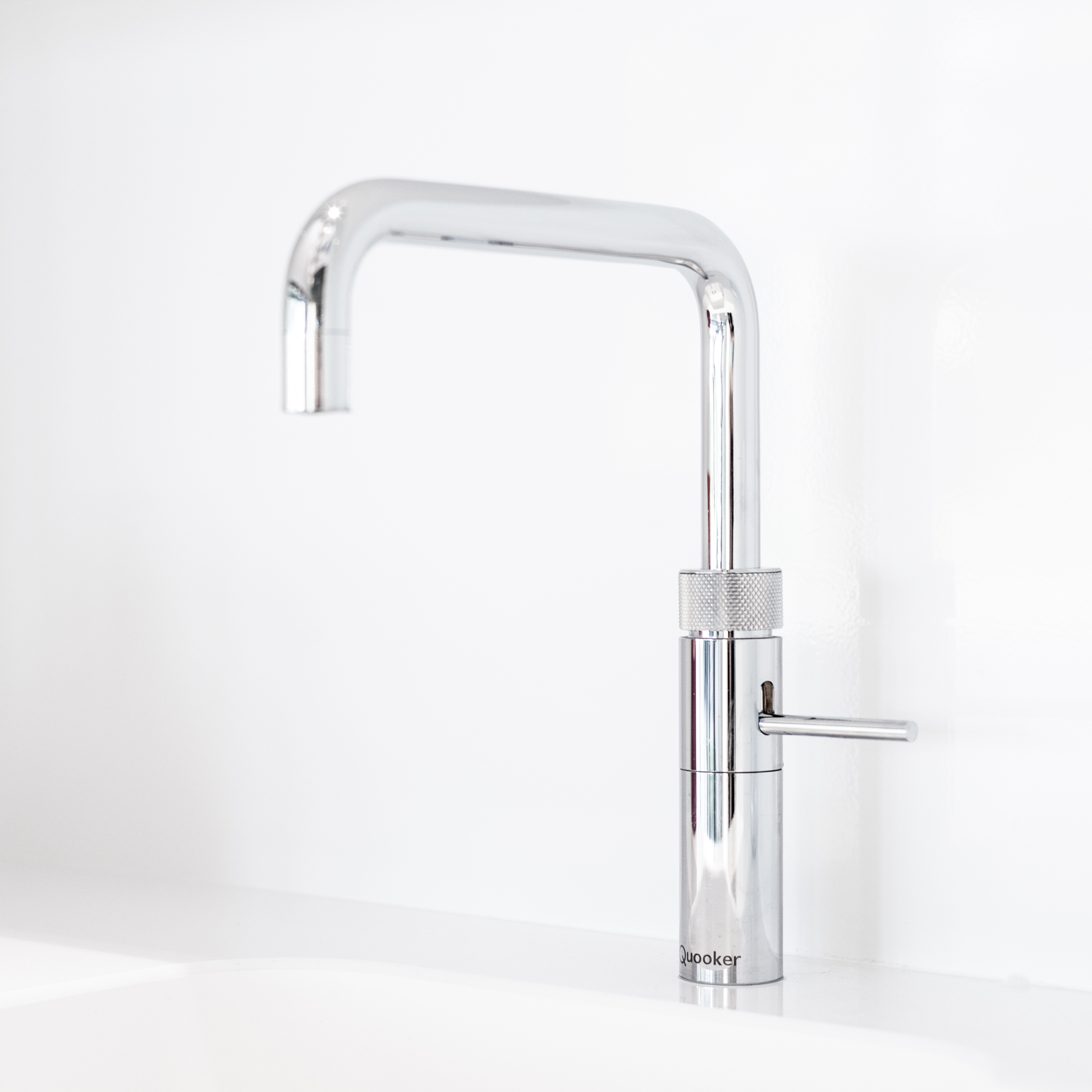
The Quooker Fusion Square.

- 1970 – Henri Peteri came up with the idea to develop a device that produces instant boiling water
- 1972 – The first patent
- 1976 –The first series of taps and tanks (40 pieces)
- 1978 – Henri Peteri was forced to discontinue his project and go back to earning a living for his family
- 1978 – Prototype. IDEI Design: The designers of the first Renault Espace
- 1985 – Henri's son Niels began working in his father's cellar, the idea became a product and Quooker was born
- 1988 – First set produced by Niels Peteri (100 pieces)
- 1992 – The launch of the Quooker basic, the first series of taps designed by Niels Peteri
- 1993 – Reinforced with other son Walter the product was launched commercially
- 1995 – Quooker bought their first building on Staalstraat in Ridderkerk
- 1997 – The first addition to the tap collection, the Classic
- 2000 – The launch of the Quooker VAQ, which denotes the tank's revolutionary high-vacuum insulation.
- 2004 – Quooker began exporting for the first time
- 2006 – Introduction of the Quooker COMBI, this model is 60% smaller and far more energy efficient than other boiling or hot water equipment
- 2007 – Henri Peteri died in this year, his greatest achievement was that the three of them (Walter, Niels and himself) had worked so well together
- 2010 – Introducing the Twintaps, a combined boiling water and mixer tap in the same design
- 2012 – The launch of the Quooker Fusion
- 2016 – Completing the built of a new factory, doubling the working area to 11.000 m²
- 2016 – Introduction of the Quooker Flex, a flexible hose for hot and cold water
- 2017 – The Quooker Flex is awarded a Dutch Design Award
- 2018 – Opened the doors of their new office in Manchester
- 2019 – Introduction of the Quooker CUBE, with chilled sparkling and filtered water as two new features
- 2022 – The launch of the Quooker Front

== Function ==
A Quooker set consists of a tap and at least one reservoir. The tap is placed on the counter, usually above the sink and possibly next to a regular tap. The reservoir is placed under the sink, close to the faucet. The reservoir is vacuum insulated so that the water in the reservoir, once brought up to temperature, remains at 110°C. When water is drawn from the reservoir, the reservoir is immediately topped up with fresh water. This new water is then brought up to temperature and maintained together with the old water.

== Locations ==
Quooker currently produces 120,000 Quookers per year, there are more than 4000 dealers, the turnover doubles every three years and they are located in the Netherlands, Belgium, Austria, Denmark, Germany, United Kingdom, Luxembourg, Norway, Ireland, Switzerland, the United Arab Emirates, Hong Kong, Spain, Israel, Portugal and Italy. Though, its products can be bought and shipped to many other countries.

== Slogans ==
Quooker's slogan in Dutch is 'de kraan die alles kan', which literally translates to 'the tap that does it all'.
