= Janne Reinikainen (footballer) =

Finnish football player (born 1981)

Personal information
- Date of birth: 23 October 1981 (age 45)
- Place of birth: Finland
- Height: 1.71 m (5 ft 7 1/2 in)
- Position: Defender

Team information
- Current team: KuPS
- Number: 3

Senior career*
Years	Team	Apps	(Gls)
2003–2009	KuPS	64	(0)
2009–	Mikkelin Palloilijat		
- * Club domestic league appearances and goals as of 12 October 2009

Janne Reinikainen (born 23 October 1981) is a Finnish football player currently playing for Mikkelin Palloilijat.
