= Rowing at the 1980 Summer Olympics – Men's quadruple sculls =

Men's quadruple Sculls at the Games of the XXII Olympiad
- Venue: Krylatskoye Rowing Canal
- Date: 20–27 July 1980
- Competitors: 48 from 12 nations

Medalists
1st place, gold medalist(s)		Frank Dundr; Carsten Bunk; Uwe Heppner; Martin Winter	East Germany
2nd place, silver medalist(s)		Yuriy Shapochka; Evgeni Barbakov; Valeri Kleshnyov; Mykola Dovhan	Soviet Union
3rd place, bronze medalist(s)		Mincho Nikolov; Lyubomir Petrov; Ivo Rusev; Bogdan Dobrev	Bulgaria

The men's quadruple sculls rowing competition at the 1980 Summer Olympics took place at Krylatskoye Sports Complex Canoeing and Rowing Basin, Moscow, Soviet Union. The event was held from 20 to 27 July.

== Heats ==
Winner of each heat advanced to final. The remaining teams must compete in repechage for the remaining spots in the final.

=== Heat One ===
Rank	Rowers	Country	Time
1	Milan Arežina, Darko Zibar, Dragan Obradović, Nikola Stefanović	Yugoslavia	6:13.96
2	Joan Solano, Jesús González, Manuel Vera Vázquez, Julio Oliver	Spain	6:18.61
3	Reiner Modest, Per Rasmussen, Morten Espersen, Ole Bloch Jensen	Denmark	6:19.28
4	Siegfried Sageder, Bruno Flecker, Rainer Holzhaider, Michael Sageder	Austria	6:19.28
5	José Cláudio Lazzarotto, Ronaldo de Carvalho, Ricardo de Carvalho, Waldemar Trombetta	Brazil	6:25.84
6	Andrzej Skowroński, Zbigniew Andruszkiewicz, Ryszard Burak, Stanisław Wierzbicki	Poland	6:27.24

=== Heat Two ===
Rank	Rowers	Country	Time
1	Frank Dundr, Carsten Bunk, Uwe Heppner, Martin Winter	East Germany	6:01.68
2	Mincho Nikolov, Lyubomir Petrov, Ivo Rusev, Bogdan Dobrev	Bulgaria	6:01.68
3	Christian Marquis, Jean Raymond Peltier, Charles Imbert, Roland Weill	France	6:11.33
4	Yuriy Shapochka, Evgeni Barbakov, Valeri Kleshnyov, Mykola Dovhan	Soviet Union	6:14.67
5	Victor Scheffers, Jeroen Vervoort, Rob Robbers, Ronald Vervoort	Netherlands	6:28.25
6	Roberto Quintero, César Herrera, Nelson Simon, Horacio Cabrera	Cuba	6:39.28

== Repechage ==
=== Heat One ===
Rank	Rowers	Country	Time
1	Christian Marquis, Jean Raymond Peltier, Charles Imbert, Roland Weill	France	5:59.54
2	Joan Solano, Jesús González, Manuel Vera Vázquez, Julio Oliver	Spain	6:00.77
3	Victor Scheffers, Jeroen Vervoort, Rob Robbers, Ronald Vervoort	Netherlands	6:05.19
4	Siegfried Sageder, Bruno Flecker, Rainer Holzhaider, Michael Sageder	Austria	6:16.22
5	Andrzej Skowroński, Zbigniew Andruszkiewicz, Ryszard Burak, Stanisław Wierzbicki	Poland	6:16.69

=== Heat Two ===
Rank	Rowers	Country	Time
1	Yuriy Shapochka, Evgeni Barbakov, Valeri Kleshnyov, Mykola Dovhan	Soviet Union	5:57.82
2	Mincho Nikolov, Lyubomir Petrov, Ivo Rusev, Bogdan Dobrev	Bulgaria	6:00.78
3	Reiner Modest, Per Rasmussen, Morten Espersen, Ole Bloch Jensen	Denmark	6:02.60
4	José Cláudio Lazzarotto, Ronaldo de Carvalho, Ricardo de Carvalho, Waldemar Trombetta	Brazil	6:11.96
5	Roberto Quintero, César Herrera, Nelson Simon, Horacio Cabrera	Cuba	6:25.64

== Finals ==
=== Finals A ===
Rank	Rowers	Country	Time
1st place, gold medalist(s)	Frank Dundr, Carsten Bunk, Uwe Heppner, Martin Winter	East Germany	5:49.81
2nd place, silver medalist(s)	Yuriy Shapochka, Evgeni Barbakov, Valeri Kleshnyov, Mykola Dovhan	Soviet Union	5:51.47
3rd place, bronze medalist(s)	Mincho Nikolov, Lyubomir Petrov, Ivo Rusev, Bogdan Dobrev	Bulgaria	5:52.38
4	Christian Marquis, Jean Raymond Peltier, Charles Imbert, Roland Weill	France	5:53.45
5	Joan Solano, Jesús González, Manuel Vera Vázquez, Julio Oliver	Spain	6:01.19
6	Milan Arežina, Darko Zibar, Dragan Obradović, Nikola Stefanović	Yugoslavia	6:10.76

=== Finals B ===
Rank	Rowers	Country	Time
7	Andrzej Skowroński, Zbigniew Andruszkiewicz, Ryszard Burak, Stanisław Wierzbicki	Poland	5:58.63
8	Victor Scheffers, Jeroen Vervoort, Rob Robbers, Ronald Vervoort	Netherlands	6:02.58
9	Reiner Modest, Per Rasmussen, Morten Espersen, Ole Bloch Jensen	Denmark	6:05.38
10	Siegfried Sageder, Bruno Flecker, Rainer Holzhaider, Michael Sageder	Austria	6:06.27
11	José Cláudio Lazzarotto, Ronaldo de Carvalho, Ricardo de Carvalho, Waldemar Trombetta	Brazil	6:06.58
12	Roberto Quintero, César Herrera, Nelson Simon, Horacio Cabrera	Cuba	6:16.65
