= Rowing at the 1976 Summer Olympics – Men's quadruple sculls =

Men's quadruple sculls at the Games of the XXI Olympiad
- Date: 18–25 July 1976
- Competitors: 45 from 11 nations

Medalists
1st place, gold medalist(s)		Wolfgang Güldenpfennig; Rüdiger Reiche; Karl-Heinz Bußert; Michael Wolfgramm	East Germany
2nd place, silver medalist(s)		Yevgeniy Duleyev; Yuriy Yakimov; Aivars Lazdenieks; Vytautas Butkus	Soviet Union
3rd place, bronze medalist(s)		Jaroslav Hellebrand; Václav Vochoska; Zdeněk Pecka; Vladek Lacina	Czechoslovakia

The men's quadruple sculls competition at the 1976 Summer Olympics took place at Notre Dame Island Olympic Basin, Canada. It was the first time that the event was included at the Olympics.

== Competition format ==
The competition consisted of two main rounds (heats and finals) as well as a repechage. The 11 boats were divided into two heats for the first round, with 6 boats in one heat and 5 boats in the other. The winner of each heat advanced directly to the "A" final (1st through 6th place). The remaining 9 boats were placed in the repechage. Two heats were held in the repechage, with 5 boats in one heat and 4 boats in the other. The top two boats in each heat of the repechage went to the "A" final as well. The remaining 5 boats (3rd, 4th, and 5th placers in the repechage heats) competed in the "B" final for 7th through 11th place.

All races were over a 2000 metre course.

== Results ==
=== Heats ===
==== Heat 1 ====
Rank	Rowers	Nation	Time	Notes
1	Jaroslav Hellebrand; Vladek Lacina; Zdeněk Pecka; Václav Vochoska	Czechoslovakia	5:49.21	QA
2	Michael Gentsch; Norbert Kothe; Helmut Krause; Helmut Wolber	West Germany	5:53.40	R
3	Peter Cortes; Kenneth Foote; Neil Halleen; John Van Blom	United States	5:55.05	R
4	Thomas Bishop; Mark Hayter; Andrew Justice; Allan Whitwell	Great Britain	5:58.79	R
5	Denis Oswald; Hans Ruckstuhl; Jürg Weitnauer; Reto Wyss	Switzerland	6:03.44	R
6	Louis Bourassa; York Langerfeld; Louis Prévost; André Renart	Canada	6:19.88	R

==== Heat 2 ====
Rank	Rowers	Nation	Time	Notes
1	Vytautas Butkus; Yevgeniy Duleyev; Aivars Lazdenieks; Yuriy Yakimov	Soviet Union	5:47.83	QA
2	Karl-Heinz Bußert; Wolfgang Güldenpfennig; Rüdiger Reiche; Michael Wolfgramm	East Germany	5:50.87	R
3	Eftim Gerzilov; Mincho Nikolov; Yordan Valchev; Khristo Zhelev	Bulgaria	5:57.19	R
4	Charles Imbert; Patrick Morineau; Roland Thibaut; Roland Weill	France	5:58.92	R
5	Ramón Luperón; Francisco Rodríguez; Nelson Simon; Cirilo Suárez	Cuba	8:00.68	R

=== Repechage ===
==== Repechage heat 1 ====
Rank	Rowers	Nation	Time	Notes
1	Michael Gentsch; Norbert Kothe; Helmut Krause; Helmut Wolber	West Germany	5:48.52	QA
2	Eftim Gerzilov; Mincho Nikolov; Yordan Valchev; Khristo Zhelev	Bulgaria	5:49.38	QA
3	Charles Imbert; Patrick Morineau; Roland Thibaut; Roland Weill	France	5:53.55	QB
4	Denis Oswald; Hans Ruckstuhl; Jürg Weitnauer; Reto Wyss	Switzerland	5:57.82	QB
5	Louis Bourassa; York Langerfeld; Louis Prévost; André Renart	Canada	6:14.49	QB

==== Repechage heat 2 ====
Rank	Rowers	Nation	Time	Notes
1	Karl-Heinz Bußert; Wolfgang Güldenpfennig; Rüdiger Reiche; Michael Wolfgramm	East Germany	5:50.36	QA
2	Peter Cortes; Kenneth Foote; Neil Halleen; John Van Blom	United States	5:55.23	QA
3	Thomas Bishop; Mark Hayter; Andrew Justice; Allan Whitwell	Great Britain	5:58.68	QB
4	César Herrera; Ramón Luperón; Francisco Rodríguez; Nelson Simon	Cuba	6:10.11	QB

=== Finals ===
==== Final B ====
Rank	Rowers	Nation	Time
7	Charles Imbert; Patrick Morineau; Roland Thibaut; Roland Weill	France	6:28.60
8	Denis Oswald; Hans Ruckstuhl; Jürg Weitnauer; Reto Wyss	Switzerland	6:29.61
9	Thomas Bishop; Mark Hayter; Andrew Justice; Allan Whitwell	Great Britain	6:32.83
10	César Herrera; Ramón Luperón; Francisco Rodríguez; Nelson Simon	Cuba	6:40.76
11	Louis Bourassa; York Langerfeld; Louis Prévost; André Renart	Canada	6:44.74

==== Final A ====
Rank	Rowers	Nation	Time
1st place, gold medalist(s)	Karl-Heinz Bußert; Wolfgang Güldenpfennig; Rüdiger Reiche; Michael Wolfgramm	East Germany	6:18.65
2nd place, silver medalist(s)	Vytautas Butkus; Yevgeniy Duleyev; Aivars Lazdenieks; Yuriy Yakimov	Soviet Union	6:19.89
3rd place, bronze medalist(s)	Jaroslav Hellebrand; Vladek Lacina; Zdeněk Pecka; Václav Vochoska	Czechoslovakia	6:21.77
4	Michael Gentsch; Norbert Kothe; Helmut Krause; Helmut Wolber	West Germany	6:24.81
5	Eftim Gerzilov; Mincho Nikolov; Yordan Valchev; Khristo Zhelev	Bulgaria	6:32.04
6	Peter Cortes; Kenneth Foote; Neil Halleen; John Van Blom	United States	6:34.33

== Final classification ==
Rank	Rowers	Country
1st place, gold medalist(s)	Wolfgang Güldenpfennig; Rüdiger Reiche; Karl-Heinz Bußert; Michael Wolfgramm	East Germany
2nd place, silver medalist(s)	Yevgeniy Duleyev; Yuriy Yakimov; Aivars Lazdenieks; Vytautas Butkus	Soviet Union
3rd place, bronze medalist(s)	Jaroslav Hellebrand; Václav Vochoska; Zdeněk Pecka; Vladek Lacina	Czechoslovakia
4	Norbert Kothe; Helmut Krause; Michael Gentsch; Helmut Wolber	West Germany
5	Yordan Valchev; Mincho Nikolov; Khristo Zhelev; Eftim Gerzilov	Bulgaria
6	Peter Cortes; Kenneth Foote; Neil Halleen; John Van Blom	United States
7	Roland Weill; Roland Thibaut; Patrick Morineau; Charles Imbert	France
8	Hans Ruckstuhl; Denis Oswald; Jürg Weitnauer; Reto Wyss	Switzerland
9	Andrew Justice; Mark Hayter; Allan Whitwell; Thomas Bishop	Great Britain
10	Francisco Rodríguez; César Herrera; Ramón Luperón; Nelson Simon; Cirilo Suárez	Cuba
11	Louis Bourassa; York Langerfeld; Louis Prévost; André Renart	Canada
