= ETB Sat =

Basque international television channel

ETB SAT
- Country: Spain and France
- Broadcast area: Worldwide
- Network: ETB
- Headquarters: Bilbao, Basque Country

Programming
- Language(s): Basque, Spanish and French

Ownership
- Owner: EiTB
- Sister channels: ETB 1 ETB 2 ETB 3 ETB 4 Canal Vasco

History
- Launched: 3 June 1996; 28 years ago

Links
- Website: eitb.eus/eu/telebista/eitb-basque

Availability

Streaming media
- eitb.eus: Live streaming

ETB Sat was an international television channel operated by Euskal Irrati Telebista.

The channel aimed to bring television and Basque culture to Basques and others worldwide. Its programming was based primarily on self-produced content from the domestic flagship channels ETB 1 and ETB 2. The programming is offered in Spanish, Basque and French. On 1 May 2013, the channel decided to cease broadcasting on Astra satellite in Europe, focusing its availability on CATV operators and the online live streaming.

On 1 January 2021, it was merged along with Canal Vasco into ETB Basque.

== Programming ==
- Teleberri – News in Spanish language
- Gaur Egun – News in Basque language
- Lazkao Txiki – Cartoons
- Dokugune – Talk show
- EiTB Kultura – Cultural
- Exclusivas ETB – News reports
- Surfin' Euskadi – Surfing
- Objetivo Euskadi – Reports and interviews on current affairs
- La Noche de... – Film program
- Vaya Semanita – Comedy show
- Basxtrem – Contest
- Chiloè
- Mihiluze – Word game in Basque

== See also ==
- Euskal Irrati Telebista
- ETB 1
- ETB 2
- ETB 3
- ETB 4
- Canal Vasco
