= Canal Vasco =

Basque international television channel

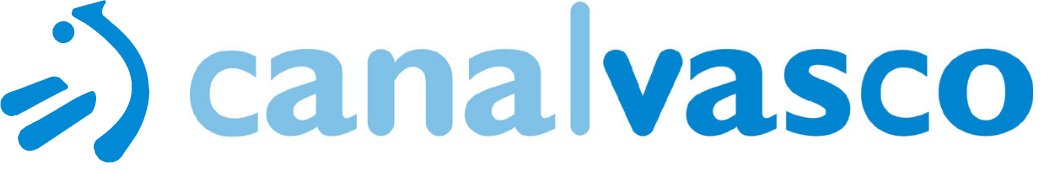
- Country: Spain
- Broadcast area: Americas; Worldwide
- Network: ETB
- Headquarters: Bilbao, Basque Country

Programming
- Language(s): Basque and Spanish

Ownership
- Owner: EiTB
- Sister channels: ETB 1 ETB 2 ETB 3 ETB 4 ETB Sat

History
- Launched: March 2001; 24 years ago

Links
- Website: eitb.eus/en

Availability

Streaming media
- eitb.eus: Live streaming

Canal Vasco ("Basque channel" in Spanish) was the name that the Euskal Irrati Telebista group used to broadcast its international television channel, ETB Sat, via satellite and CATV operators in the Americas, until they were both merged into ETB Basque on 1 January 2021.

This channel brought Basque-language television and Basque culture to the large Basque community residing in the Americas, as well as other citizens of these areas. Its programming was based primarily on self-produced content from the domestic flagship channels ETB 1 and ETB 2.

== See also ==
- Euskal Irrati Telebista
- ETB 1
- ETB 2
- ETB 3
- ETB 4
- ETB Sat
