= Sageder =

Sageder is an Austrian surname. Notable people with the surname include:

- Alfred Sageder (1933–2017), Austrian rower
- Michael Sageder (born 1959), Austrian rower
- Sebastian Sageder (born 1980), Austrian rower
- Siegfried Sageder (born 1957), Austrian rower
- Stéphane Sageder (born 1971), French weightlifter
- Thomas Sageder (born 1983), Austrian football manager
