= Bourassa =

Bourassa may refer to:

== People ==
- Ernie Bourassa, mayor of Whitehorse, Yukon
- François Bourassa (1813–1898), Quebec farmer and political figure
- François Bourassa (musician) (born 1959), Québécois jazz pianist
- Henri Bourassa (1868–1952), Québécois politician noted for his French Canadian nationalism
- Jocelyne Bourassa (1947–2021), Canadian golfer
- Joseph Boutin Bourassa (1853–1943), Quebec politician
- Louis Bourassa (born 1954), Canadian rower
- Lucien Bourassa (1884–1937), mayor of Shawnigan, Quebec
- Napoléon Bourassa (1827–1916), Canadian architect
- Robert Bourassa (1933–1996), politician and former Quebec premier

== Places ==
- Henri Bourassa Boulevard, Island of Montreal, Quebec, Canada
- Robert-Bourassa Boulevard, Ville-Marie, Montreal, Quebec, Canada

Electoral districts

- Bourassa (electoral district), federal electoral district in Quebec
- Bourassa (provincial electoral district), in Quebec
- Bourassa-Sauvé (provincial electoral district), in Quebec

== Facilities and structures ==
- Robert-Bourassa generating station, La Grande 2, James Bay Project, Quebec, Canada
- Robert-Bourassa Reservoir, James Bay Project, Quebec, Canada
- Bourassa State Forest, Bedford County, Virginia, USA
- Henri-Bourassa station (subway), Montreal metro system, Montreal, Quebec, Canada
- Terminus Henri-Bourassa (bus), Montreal, Quebec, Canada
- Place Bourassa (shopping mall), Montreal North, Montreal, Quebec, Canada
- École Secondaire Henri-Bourassa (Bourassa High School), Montreal Nord, Montreal, Quebec, Canada

== Other ==
- Bourassa (automobile), various one-off automobiles built by Henri-Emile Bourassa between 1899 and 1926.
