= Wolber =

Wolber may refer to:

- GP Wolber
- Helmut Wolber
- Wolber–Spidel, French professional cycling team

== See also ==
- Wolbert
- Olde Wolbers
