= El conquistador del fin del mundo =

Spanish reality television series

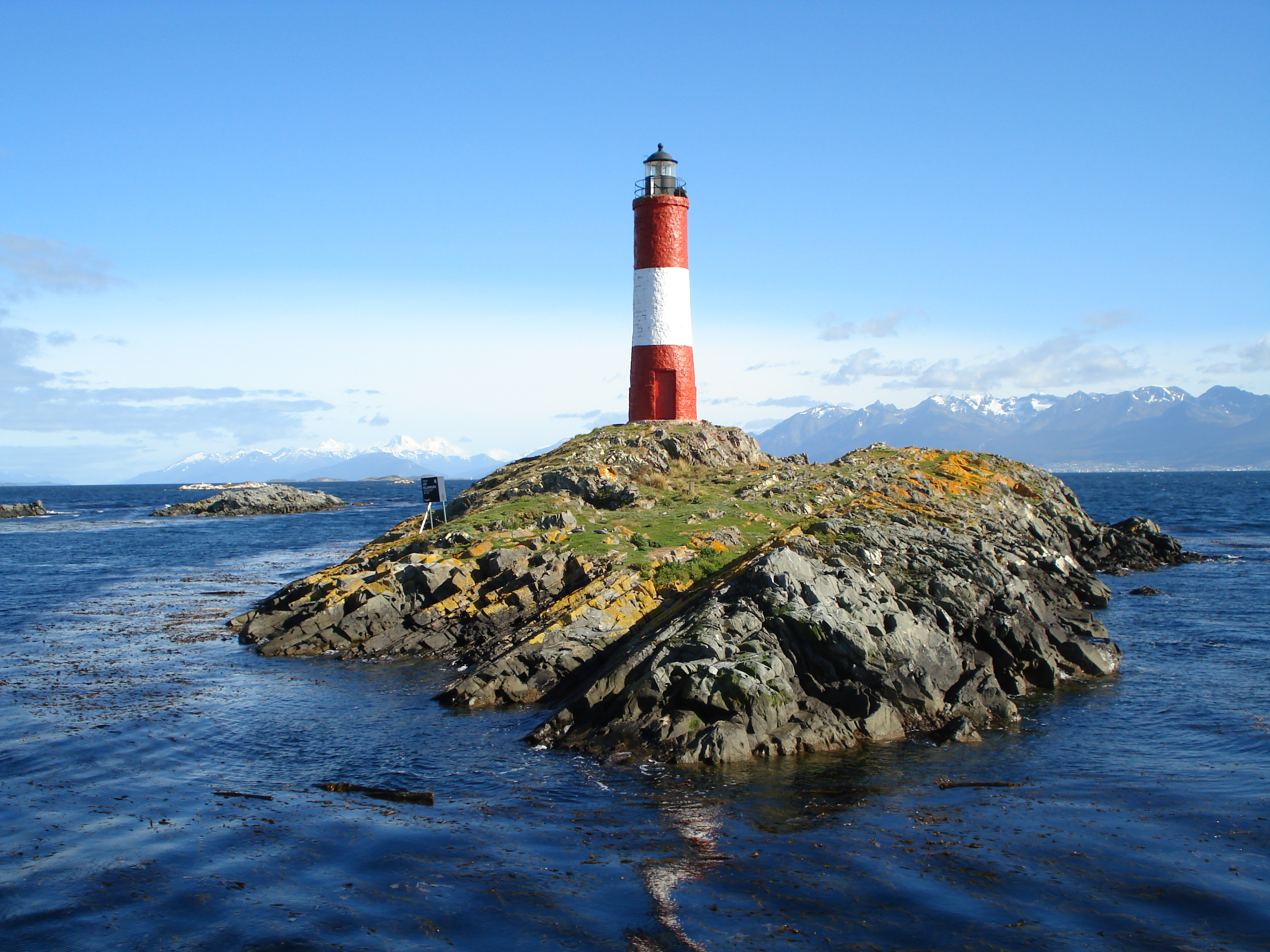
- Les Eclaireurs Lighthouse, also known as The lighthouse of the end of the world.
- Genre: Reality show
- Directed by: Joxan Goñi; Patxi Alonso
- Presented by: Julian Iantzi; Patxi Alonso (debate)
- Country of origin: Spain
- Original language: Spanish
- No. of seasons: 21

Production
- Executive producers: Patxi Alonso; Gonzalo Honigblum
- Producers: Víctor Martín; Beronike López; Idoia Gainberri
- Editor: Verónica Vañek
- Running time: 150 minutes approx

Original release
- Network: EITB
- Release: January 3, 2005

El conquistador del fin del mundo (The Conqueror of the End of the World, often shortened to "El Conquis" in Spanish) is an adventure reality TV show created by Euskal Telebista (ETB).

Its contestants are divided into teams that fight not only against the roughness of the land and the climate but also against the different events which they encounter. The living conditions are difficult, having to deal with the cold, heat, rain, insects, hunger and thirst. Physical endurance as well as the capacity to live with strangers are essential to survive this adventure.

== Program characteristics ==
Its contestants are divided in groups that compete between them with different events apart from the climate, hunger, thirst and so on. The physical condition and the capability to live with strangers are also very important in order to win this competition.

This program is based on other previous ones like Basetxea and Conquistadores del fin del mundo.

In its first edition in 2005, twelve out of its sixteen contestants where from the Basque Country and the other four from Argentina, but with Basque roots. The goal was to bring the ikurriña (Basque flag), to the Les Éclaireus lighthouse in the Beagle Channel. Early in the year 2008, an Argentinian version was produced. Since the seventh edition (2011), the final's emplacement changed. In 2011, the final was held on the Perito Moreno Glacier, place which would be repeated in 2014 (10th edition). In 2012 (8th edition) and 2013 (9th edition), it was held at Iguazu Falls, and in 2015 (11th edition), in the Pacific Ocean, at the mouth of the Palena River.

After that, the program's production changed place, and it has never returned to Argentina ever since. In 2016 it took part in Colombia, in the Amazonas rainforest. For this reason, the name of the program itself was changed to "El conquistador del Amazonas." Ever since, the program's name has been "El conquistador del Caribe" (The conqueror of the Caribbean), with the exception of the fifteenth edition (2019), in which it was called "El conquistador del Pacífico" (The conqueror of the Pacific). From the 12th to the 14th editions (2016-2018), the program was shot in Colombia, in the 15th edition (2019) it was shot in Panama, in the Pearl Islands, and ever since, the last three editions have been shot in the Dominican Republic, in the Los Haitises National Park.

The program does not only count with the participation of anonymous people; professional athletes have also participated, as in the case of David Seco and Zuriñe Rodríguez. In the early editions, prominent Basque sportspeople (such as José Luis Korta and Juanito Oiarzabal) have acted as team captains, but in the last editions, successful or notorious ex-participants have been called as captains more often.

== Reception ==
It was awarded as the Best Entertainment Autonomic Program of 2008 by the Academy of Spanish Television. It is usually considered one of the most extreme shows on television because of the combination of extreme events, survival and cohabitation, and also because of the format of the reality, that changes every year surprising the contestants and the audience. For all of that, each edition gathers more followers, not only in the Basque Country, but also in other provinces, achieving assessments 25% higher than the average of the channel.

== Controversies ==
Some groups pro animal rights reported that the program encourages animal mistreatment in some of its events by killing chickens, frogs, worms and fish or even for feeding an animal until it threw up. The Aranzadi Science Society has also reported that an inoffensive protected species of snake was killed, as well as some other animals under the same circumstances.

== Previous editions ==
For a more extensive review on every season, check the Spanish Wikipedia annex: "El Conquis" editions.

Edition	Date	Edition review	Winner	Finalists
(Argentina) ECDFDM I	2005	Two teams of 8 participants, Corona Austral and Cruz Azul, fought until merging.	(Basque Country (autonomous community)) Eneko Van Horenbeke	(Basque Country (autonomous community)) Javier Goikoetxea, Goiko (Basque Country (autonomous community)) Ignacio Cebolla, Natxo
(Argentina) ECDFDM II	2006	Two teams of 8 participants, Pumas (capt'd by José Luis Korta) and Cóndores (capt'd by Julen Madina), fought until merging.	(Basque Country (autonomous community)) Raúl Arribas	(Basque Country (autonomous community)) Azucena Díez (Basque Country (autonomous community)) Patxi Hernández
(Argentina) ECDFDM III	2007	Two teams of 9 participants, Pumas (capt'd by Mikel Goñi) and Cóndores (capt'd by Juanito Oiarzabal), fought until merging. Mikel Goñi had to be replaced by Korta for medical reasons.	(Basque Country (autonomous community)) Lourdes Zuriarrain	(Basque Country (autonomous community)) María José Sardón (Basque Country (autonomous community)) Josu Rus, Ruso (Basque Country (autonomous community)) Silvia Sánchez
(Argentina) ECDFDM IV	2008	Two teams of 10 participants, Pumas (capt'd by Juanito and Marta López) and Cóndores (capt'd by Virginia Berasategui and Juan Cuyami), fought until merging.	(Basque Country (autonomous community)) Gorka Toraño	(Basque Country (autonomous community)) Iosu Vázquez (Basque Country (autonomous community)) Eguzki Garmendia
(Argentina) ECDFDM V	2009	Two teams of 10 participants, Pumas (capt'd by Korta and Juanito) and Cóndores (capt'd by Eneritz Iturriaga and Yahaira Aguirre), fought until merging.	(Basque Country (autonomous community)) Gotzon Mantuliz	(Basque Country (autonomous community)) Josu Abrego (Senegal) Ndiaga Ngom (Basque Country (autonomous community)) José Vicente, Alonso
(Argentina) ECDFDM VI	2010	The 25 participants began their adventure under the scrutiny of ex-boxer Manu Maritxalar. Then, the remaining 19 participants were divided in two teams, Pumas (capt'd by Korta) and Cóndores (capt'd by Juanito), fought until merging.	(Basque Country (autonomous community)) Egoitz Ríos	(Basque Country (autonomous community)) Oihane Jiménez (Basque Country (autonomous community)) Koldo Pozueta (Basque Country (autonomous community)) Ekaitz Ríos
(Argentina) ECDFDM VII	2011	Three teams, Guanacos (capt'd by Korta, made out of 8 men), Cóndores (capt'd by Irati Anda, made out of 8 women) and Pumas (capt'd by Juanito, made out of 8 people from immigrants living in the Basque Country), fought until merging.	(Basque Country (autonomous community)) Nakor Márquez	(Basque Country (autonomous community)) Lur Ibarra (Basque Country (autonomous community)) Helenka Gómez (Basque Country (autonomous community)) Maider Otegi
(Argentina) (Brazil) ECDFDM VIII	2012	The 24 participants began in a single group being captained by four different captains. After the fourth immunity game, the 4 captains had to vote one out, and Manu Maritxalar was chosen out. The other three captains were given a team made out of the remaining 19 participants (Guanacos, capt'd by Korta; Cóndores, capt'd by Juan Mari Lujambio; and Pumas, capt'd by Mikel Goñi. After the fifteenth game, the merge occurred.	(Basque Country (autonomous community)) David Seco	(Aragon) Javier Adell, Lobo (Basque Country (autonomous community)) Yeray González (Basque Country (autonomous community)) Ibon Urrutia
(Argentina) (Brazil) ECDFDM IX	2013	Four teams of 7 participants, Pumas (capt'd by Blanca Fernández Ochoa), Cóndores (capt'd by Juanito), Guanacos (capt'd by Korta) and Piches (capt'd by Manu Maritxalar) fought in a first phase. After the seventh episode, the grey Piche team became extinct, and the remaining four participants were divided between the other three teams. After the 12th episode, the green Guanaco team also became extinct, and the remaining four participants were divided between the other two teams. The merge finally occurred in the 17th episode.	(Basque Country (autonomous community)) Óskar Sanz	(Basque Country (autonomous community)) Iñaki Larrasolo (Basque Country (autonomous community)) Diana Cantero (Basque Country (autonomous community)) Karen Odriozola (Basque Country (autonomous community)) José Mari San José, Joxe
(Argentina) ECDFDM X	2014	28 participants were divided in three teams: Coatíes (capt's by David Seco), Yaguaretés (capt'd by Korta and Juanito) and Yacarés (capt's by Manu Maritxalar, made out of participants from previous seasons). The green Yacaré team became extinct, and the remaining two participants were divided between the two teams. The merge occurred after the 12th game.	(Basque Country (autonomous community)) Eneko Van Horenbeke	(Basque Country (autonomous community)) Irene Muruzábal (Basque Country (autonomous community)) Sandra Barea
(Argentina) (Chile) ECDFDM XI	2015	26 participants began in two teams divided by gender. The men's team was capt'd by Eneko Van Horenbeke and Roberto Laiseka, and the women's team was capt'd by David Seco and Manu Maritxalar. The first four games were made to decide which two captains would go on to the next phase of the competition. The women's team won, so Laiseka and Eneko were eliminated. The remaining 22 participants (in addition to three late entrants) were divided in three teams: Pumas (capt'd by Manu Maritxalar), Cóndores (capt'd by David Seco), and Guanacos (capt'd by Korta and Juanito). The blue Cóndor team became extinct, and the 3 remaining participants were divided between the other two teams. The merge finally occurred in the 18th episode, only one episode before the final. This edition remains very controversial, as the last 6 participants were caught cheating just before the final, which made it impossible for the program to set a punishment similar to others applied in similar situations in past editions.	(Basque Country (autonomous community)) Eritz Egaña Beristain, Maixa	(Basque Country (autonomous community)) Sergio López (Basque Country (autonomous community)) Andeka Rico (Basque Country (autonomous community)) Iker Santxo
(Colombia) El conquistador del Amazonas	2016	Three teams (Pirañas, capt'd by Pello Ruiz Cabestany, made up by 10 people under 30 years; Anacondas, capt'd by Patxi Salinas, made up by 11 people over 30 years; and Jaguares, no captain, made up by 8 people with previous experience in different Basque and Spanish reality shows) began the adventure in the Amazon forest. After only 4 games, the red Jaguar team became extinct, and the 2 remaining participants were divided between the other two teams. The merge occurred in the 12th episode, and the two captains were given the option to remain as regular participants. Only Salinas chose to keep going. In the 16th episode, when 9 participants remained, two of them were caught cheating, and they were given an ultimatum: one of them had to be expelled immediately. Some participants thought the punishment to be too harsh, and as protest, 4 of the 9 remaining participants (5, including the expelled one) decided to go home.	(Basque Country (autonomous community)) Olga Erkuden Sola, Erku	(Basque Country (autonomous community)) Iñaki Lekuona, Leku (Basque Country (autonomous community)) Nerea Arriaga, Txirrita
(Colombia) El conquistador del Caribe I	2017	Three teams of 11 participants, Wüis (capt'd by David Seco), Puyuiis (capt'd by previous edition winner Erku) and Samulus (capt'd by Marcelo Ferreira), began the adventure. Ferreira was expelled from the program after supposedly pushing one participant from his team. After a massive 6-people walkout, the red Puyuii team became extinct, and the 2 remaining participants were divided between the other two teams. The merge occurred in the 15th episode.	(Basque Country (autonomous community)) Andoni Iruretagoyena, Izeta	(Basque Country (autonomous community)) Aiskander Jauregi (Basque Country (autonomous community)) Isma Pereira (Basque Country (autonomous community)) Aitor Barrio (Basque Country (autonomous community)) Carolina Calvo
(Colombia) El conquistador del Caribe II	2018	Three teams of 10 participants, Wüis (capt'd by Eneko Van Horenbeke), Puyuiis (capt'd by Ismael Mateo and previous edition participant Gorrotxa) and Samulus (capt'd by Telmo Aldaz de la Quadra Salcedo), began the adventure. The blue Samulu team became extinct, and the 4 remaining participants were divided between the other two teams. The merge occurred in the 15th episode.	(Basque Country (autonomous community)) Eider Alonso	(Basque Country (autonomous community)) Gotzon Burgos (Basque Country (autonomous community)) Aiora Armendáriz (Basque Country (autonomous community)) Xabier Garate, Seleta (Basque Country (autonomous community)) Zuriñe Rodríguez
(Panama) El conquistador del Pacífico	2019	Three teams of 11 participants, Jé (capt'd by Patri Espinar and Nagore Osoro), Beda-Kayirua (capt'd by Manu Maritxalar and ex-participant Seleta) and Angoso (capt'd by Eneko Van Horenbeke and David Seco), began the adventure. The blue Angoso team became extinct, and the 4 remaining participants were divided between the other two teams. The merge occurred in the 17th episode.	(Basque Country (autonomous community)) Iker Babio	(Basque Country (autonomous community)) Ibai Vidal (Castile and León) Luisito Angulo (Bulgaria) Krasimir Dariev, Krasi (Basque Country (autonomous community)) Ianire Cortés (Basque Country (autonomous community)) Jontxu Beristain
(Dominican Republic) El conquistador del Caribe III	2020	Three teams of 12 participants, Maja (capt'd by Patri Espinar, made up by women), Guaraguao (capt'd by ex-participant Gotzon Burgos, made up by men) and Caguama (capt'd by Eneko Van Horenbeke, made up by men and women older than 35 years), began the adventure. After the 14th episode, the teams were mixed up and two new captains replaced the previous three. The new teams were called Guaraguao and Caguama, capt'd by Seleta and Manu Maritxalar, respectively, and were chosen by the captains themselves. The merge occurred in the 23rd episode, only one before the final.	(Basque Country (autonomous community)) Mikel Pérez	(Basque Country (autonomous community)) Jon Quel Sola (Basque Country (autonomous community)) Isma Mateo (Basque Country (autonomous community)) Lander Sánchez (Basque Country (autonomous community)) Jon Erro (Basque Country (autonomous community)) Eider García, Durana
(Dominican Republic) El conquistador del Caribe IV	2021	Three teams of 12 participants, Atabey (capt'd by ex-participant Durana, made up by women), Yocahu (capt'd by Manu Maritxalar (who had to abandon for medical reasons just after arriving), made up by men) and Corocote (capt'd by Seleta, made up by 7 men and 5 women), began the adventure. After the 11th episode, the teams were mixed up and two new captains replaced the previous three. The new teams were called Cacata and Cuyaya, capt'd by Eneko Van Horenbeke and David Seco, respectively, and were chosen by the captains themselves. The merge occurred in the 21st episode. The final had to be delayed 4 months due to a COVID-19 outbreak among the participants and crew.	(Basque Country (autonomous community)) Nahia Valencia	(Basque Country (autonomous community)) Aitor Acebo (Basque Country (autonomous community)) Jon Zabaleta, Beko (Basque Country (autonomous community)) Mikel Yanci (Basque Country (autonomous community)) Asier Urzelai, Binbi
(Dominican Republic) El conquistador del Caribe V	2022	A team of 19 women and a team of 20 men began the adventure competing against those within their teams and then all-against-all. After the third episode, three teams formed: Atabey (made up by women), Yocahu (made up by men) and Corocote (mixed gender). They were captained by ex-participants Nahia Valencia, Andrea Azkune and Bego Alday, respectively. From the 10th to the 12th episodes, ex-participants Binbi, Arantxa Iparragirre and Lobo were co-captains of the teams respectively, and from the 13th to the merge, former winner Nakor Marquez, pro aizkolari Aitzol Atutxa and Seleta replaced them. The green Atabey team became extinct in the beginning of the 18th episode, and the 4 remaining participants were divided between the other two teams. The merge occurred in the 21st episode. For the first time in the show's history, there was a draw in the final, and, therefore, two winners.	(Basque Country (autonomous community)) Jokin Ramos (Basque Country (autonomous community)) Ainize Lizarralde	(Basque Country (autonomous community)) Mikel Arruti (Brazil) Line Regis
(Dominican Republic) El conquistador del Caribe VI	2023	Four teams competed in the beginning: a team of 9 women (Atabey), another of 9 men (Yocahu), another of 10 picturesque characters (Corocote) and finally a team of 9 young contestants, from age 19 to 24 ( Guaban), these last two of mixed gender. In the third episode, the captains were introduced, and the teams were able to select them in order after a special challenge. The captains were, respectively, Jokin, Seleta, Izeta and Aini, all ex-participants and winners of previous editions. In the 8th episode, the Atabey team became extinct, and the remaining participants were incorporated into the Corocote team. After that, the Yocahu became extinct as well, and its participants were divided in the other two teams. Shortly after, the merge occurred.	(Castile and León) Alejandro López de Silanes, Locuras	(Basque Country (autonomous community)) Aitor Etxebarria, Etxe (Basque Country (autonomous community)) Jokin Leiba, Txoskin (Basque Country (autonomous community)) Olaia Ventura
(Argentina) ECDFDM XX	2024	The 20th anniversary of the format saw the show returning to the Argentinian Patagonia. Three teams took part in this edition, all of them of mixed genders: an All-Star team consisting of 12 former contestants and winners (Piches), a team of 11 picturesque individuals (Pumas) and finally a team of 11 young contestants aged 18 to 22 (Cóndores).	TBD (season now airing)	TBD

== International versions ==
In early 2008, when this television format had already run four editions for the Basque Country, an edition was produced for the first time exclusively for the Argentine public.

Backed by its success, Euskal Telebista produced other adventure programs with the same creators: El conquistador del Aconcagua (2010-2012), Conquistour (2012-2014) y Naufragoak (2022), the last one for ETB.

In 2023 RTVE bought the rights to the program to produce its own edition. In 2025, its adaptation for TelevisaUnivision with international reach was announced.

Country	Local title	Channel	Host(s)	Editions	Winners
Argentina	El conquistador del fin del mundo	Canal 13	Fabián Mazzei	2008	Nicolás Wolff
Spain	El conquistador	La 1	Julian Iantzi; Raquel Sánchez Silva	2023	Miguel Oury
Latin America	El conquistador: supervivencia extrema	Canal 5 UniMás; Vix	Valeria Marín; Julián Gil	2025	Mamba
