= Wolfgang Güldenpfennig =

East German rower

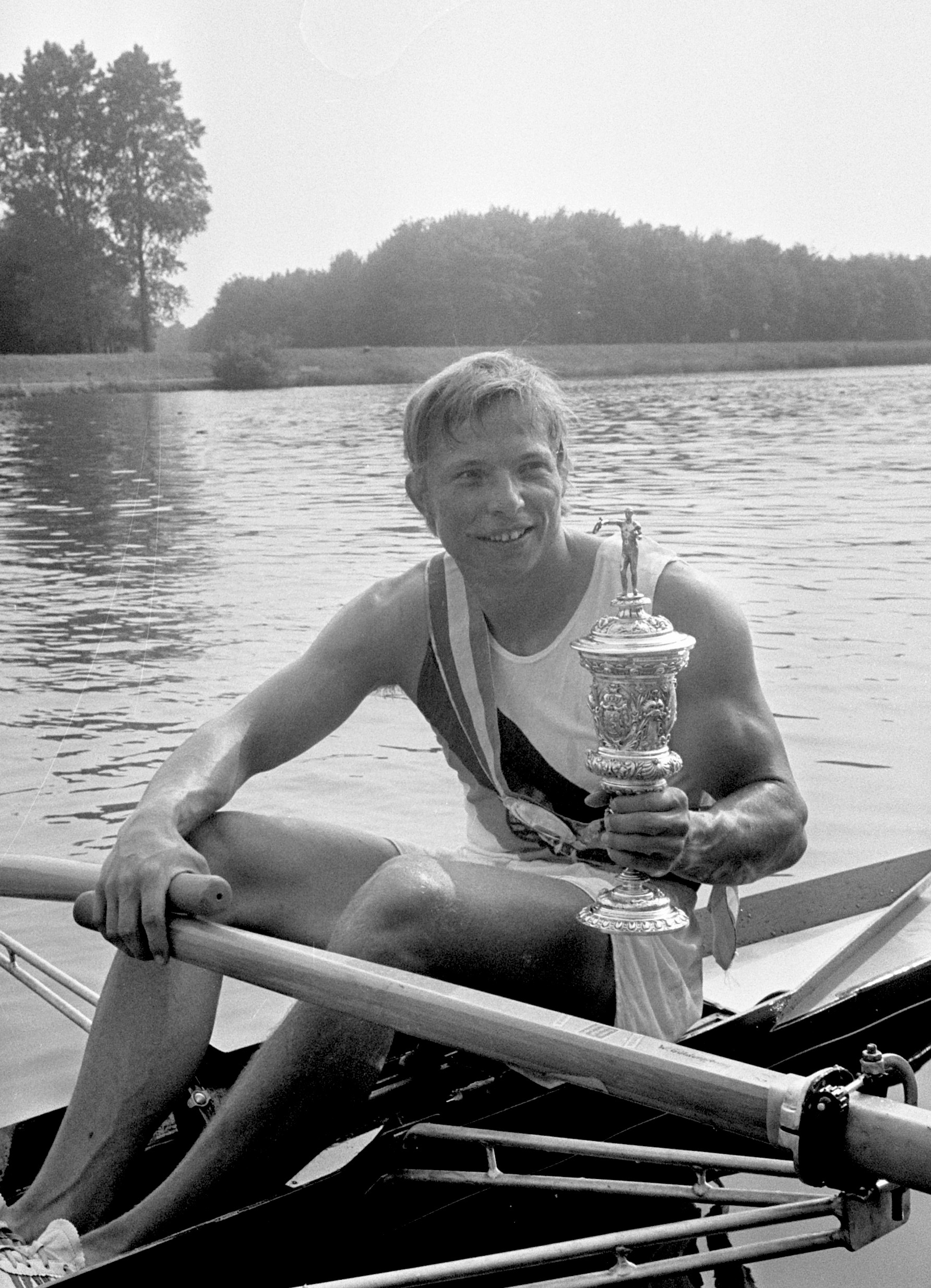
- Güldenpfennig in 1973

Personal information
- Born: 20 December 1951 (age 74) Magdeburg, East Germany
- Height: 1.82 m (6 ft 0 in)
- Weight: 82 kg (181 lb)

Sport
- Sport: Rowing
- Club: SC Magdeburg
Medal record
Men's rowing
Representing East Germany
Olympic Games
Gold medal – first place	1976 Montreal	Quadruple sculls
Bronze medal – third place	1972 Munich	Single sculls
World Rowing Championships
Gold medal – first place	1975 Nottingham	Quadruple sculls
Gold medal – first place	1977 Amsterdam	Quadruple sculls
European Rowing Championships
Bronze medal – third place	1973 Moscow	Single sculls

Wolfgang Güldenpfennig (born 20 December 1951) is a retired East German rower who competed at the 1972 and 1976 Summer Olympics. In 1972 he won a bronze medal in the single sculls event, whereas in 1976 he became Olympic champion in the quadruple sculls. Güldenpfennig won two world titles in the quadruple sculls, in 1975 and 1977, as well as a European bronze medal in the single sculls in 1973. After retiring from competitions he worked as a rowing coach, training Karl-Heinz Bußert, Uwe Heppner, Uwe Mund and Martin Winter.
