= Vaya semanita =

- .
- Country of origin: Spain
- No. of seasons: 12
- No. of episodes: 378

Production
- Production location: San Sebastian
- Running time: 90 minutes

Original release
- Network: ETB 2
- Release: September 2003 – January 2016

Vaya Semanita is a Spanish weekly sketch comedy show that is broadcast on Basque public television's second channel Euskal Telebista (ETB 2) since 2004. It is broadcast in Spanish.

== Cast ==
=== First and second seasons ===
- Óskar Terol
- Nerea Garmendia
- Iñigo Agirre
- Alejandro Tejería
- Andoni Agirregomezkorta
- Gorka Otxoa
- Elisa Lledó
- Julian Azkarate
- Maribel Salas
- Santi Ugalde
- Kike Biguri

=== Seasons 3-5 ===
- Andoni Agirregomezkorta
- Iker Galartza
- Javier Antón
- Itziar Lazkano
- Laura de la Calle
- Manuel Elizondo
- Diego Pérez
- Susana Soleto
- Antonio Salazar
- Raúl Poveda
- Julián Azkarate
- Carlos Urbina
- Ángela Moreno
- Elisa Lledó
- Ramón Merlo
- Gotzon Mantuliz
- Lander Otaola

=== Season 6 ===
- Andoni Agirregomezkorta
- Iker Galartza
- Javier Antón
- Itziar Lazkano
- Manuel Elizondo
- Diego Pérez
- Susana Soleto
- Ramon Merlo
- Itziar Atienza
- Pablo Salaberria
