= Rowing at the 1980 Summer Olympics – Men's double sculls =

Men's Double Sculls at the Games of the XXII Olympiad
- Venue: Krylatskoye Rowing Canal
- Date: 20–27 July 1980
- Competitors: 19 from 9 nations

Medalists
| 1st place, gold medalist(s) | | Joachim Dreifke and Klaus Kröppelien | East Germany |
| 2nd place, silver medalist(s) | | Zoran Pančić and Milorad Stanulov | Yugoslavia |
| 3rd place, bronze medalist(s) | | Zdeněk Pecka and Václav Vochoska | Czechoslovakia |

The men's double sculls rowing competition at the 1980 Summer Olympics took place at Krylatskoye Sports Complex Canoeing and Rowing Basin, Moscow, Soviet Union. The event was held from 20 to 27 July.

== Heats ==
Winner of each heat advanced to final. The remaining teams must compete in repechage for the remaining spots in the final.

=== Heat One ===
| Rank | Athletes Names | Country | Time |
|---|---|---|---|
| 1 | Joachim Dreifke; Klaus Kröppelien | East Germany | 6:54.69 |
| 2 | Zoran Pančić; Milorad Stanulov | Yugoslavia | 7:04.57 |
| 3 | Aleksandr Fomchenko; Yevgeny Duleyev | Soviet Union | 7:07.12 |
| 4 | Marc Boudoux; Denis Gaté | France | 7:14.43 |
| 5 | Dimitar Petrov; Stoyko Khadilev | Bulgaria | 7:21.83 |

=== Heat Two ===
| Rank | Athletes Names | Country | Time |
|---|---|---|---|
| 1 | Jim Clark; Chris Baillieu | Great Britain | 6:59.67 |
| 2 | Wiesław Kujda; Piotr Tobolski | Poland | 7:01.79 |
| 3 | José Ramón Oyarzábal; José Luis Corta | Spain | 7:11.05 |
| 4 | Zdeněk Pecka; Václav Vochoska | Czechoslovakia | 7:16.02 |

== Repechage ==
=== Heat One ===
| Rank | Athletes Names | Country | Time |
|---|---|---|---|
| 1 | Zoran Pančić; Milorad Stanulov | Yugoslavia | 6:36.46 |
| 2 | Zdeněk Pecka; Václav Vochoska | Czechoslovakia | 6:36.70 |
| 3 | José Ramón Oyarzábal; José Luis Korta | Spain | 6:43.15 |
| 4 | Dimitar Petrov; Stoyko Khadilev | Bulgaria | 7:01.25 |

=== Heat Two ===
| Rank | Athletes Names | Country | Time |
|---|---|---|---|
| 1 | Aleksandr Fomchenko; Yevgeny Duleyev | Soviet Union | 6:37.77 |
| 2 | Wiesław Kujda; Piotr Tobolski | Poland | 6:47.38 |
| 3 | Marc Boudoux; Denis Gaté | France | 7:00.61 |

== Finals ==
=== Final A ===
| Rank | Athletes Names | Country | Time |
|---|---|---|---|
| 1st place, gold medalist(s) | Joachim Dreifke; Klaus Kröppelien | East Germany | 6:24.33 |
| 2nd place, silver medalist(s) | Zoran Pančić; Milorad Stanulov | Yugoslavia | 6:26.34 |
| 3rd place, bronze medalist(s) | Zdeněk Pecka; Václav Vochoska | Czechoslovakia | 6:29.07 |
| 4 | Jim Clark; Chris Baillieu | Great Britain | 6:31.13 |
| 5 | Aleksandr Fomchenko; Yevgeny Duleyev | Soviet Union | 6:35.34 |
| 6 | Wiesław Kujda; Piotr Tobolski | Poland | 6:39.66 |

=== Final B ===
| Rank | Athletes Names | Country | Time |
|---|---|---|---|
| 7 | José Ramón Oyarzábal; José Luis Korta | Spain | 6:38.38 |
| 8 | Marc Boudoux; Didier Gallet | France | 6:40.60 |
| 9 | Dimitar Petrov; Stoyko Khadilev | Bulgaria | 6:43.81 |

== Sources ==
- Fizkultura i sport (ed.). The Official Report of the Games of the XXII Olympiad Moscow 1980 Volume Three (PDF) (PDF). p. 105.
