= Thomas Bishop (rower) =

British rower

Personal information
- Nationality: British
- Born: 8 April 1947 (age 77); Portsmouth

Sport
- Sport: Rowing
- Club: Durham University BC; Durham ARC

Thomas J A Bishop (born 8 April 1947) is a British rower who competed at the 1976 Summer Olympics.

== Rowing career ==
Bishop won a silver medal rowing for the Durham Amateur Rowing Club in the men's double sculls with Geoff Potts at the 1972 British Rowing Championships. As a student, he also competed for Durham University Boat Club and was the second former member of the club to be selected to represent Great Britain.

He was selected by Great Britain as part of the quad sculls at the 1975 World Rowing Championships, the quad finished in sixth place in the A final. At the 1976 Olympic Games he rowed as part of the men's quadruple sculls with Andrew Justice, Mark Hayter and Allan Whitwell, the crew finished in ninth place.

== Personal life ==
He married fellow international rower Diana Bishop.
