= Julian Iantzi =

Spanish television presenter

- Born: Julian Iantzi Mitxelena; Woodland, California
- Occupation(s): TV presenter Journalist
- Years active: 2001–present

Julian Iantzi Mitxelena is a Spanish TV presenter, mainly known for his works in the Basque Country television.

== Life ==
In the 1960s, Iantzi's parents, Ángel Iantzi and Txelo Mitxelena, emigrated from Lesaka to The United States, looking for a better lifestyle. They were there about 23 years, thirteen years grazing and other ten years in a farm.

== Media work ==
Later he returned to EITB to present new editions of El conquistador del fin del mundo. In that TV show, the contestants have to deal with the hard weather, to life conditions and to hard events. The aim of the reality is to bring the flag to the world's end lighthouse.

He would later return to Cuatro to present Billete a Brasil and, in 2015, to LaSexta to collaborate in Zapeando. In 2017, he returned to Antena 3 to present Contigo al fin del mundo. In 2021, he debuted in reality TV as a contestant in the sixth edition of the VIP format MasterChef Spain, where he remained for five weeks.
