= Yevgeniy Duleyev =

Russian rower (1956–2026)

Medal record

Men's rowing

Representing the Soviet Union

Olympic Games
Silver medal – second place	1976 Montreal	Quadruple sculls

World Rowing Championships
Bronze medal – third place	1975 Nottingham	Quadruple sculls

Evgeni Vasilevich Duleyev (Russian: Евгений Васильевич Дулеев; 5 April 1956 – 1 May 2026) was a Soviet and Russian rower who competed for the Soviet Union in the 1976 Summer Olympics and in the 1980 Summer Olympics.

== Biography ==
Duleyev was born in Moscow on 5 April 1956. In 1976, he was a crew member of the Soviet boat which won the silver medal in the quadruple sculls event.

Four years later he and his partner Aleksandr Fomchenko finished fifth in the double sculls competition.

Duleyev died on 1 May 2026, at the age of 70.

== Sources ==
- Evans, Hilary; Gjerde, Arild; Heijmans, Jeroen; Mallon, Bill; et al. "Yevgeny Duleyev". Olympics at Sports-Reference.com. Sports Reference LLC. Archived from the original on 18 April 2020.
