= Urrutikoetxea =

Urrutikoetxea is a surname. Notable people with the surname include:

- Josu Urrutikoetxea (born 1950), Spanish criminal
- Urtzi Urrutikoetxea (born 1977), Basque writer
- Najwa Nimri Urrutikoetxea (born 1972), Spanish actress and singer
