= Jean Peltier =

Jean Peltier may refer to:

- Jean Charles Athanase Peltier (1785–1845), French physicist
- Jean Raymond Peltier (born 1957), French rower

== See also ==
- Jean Pelletier (1935–2009), Canadian politician
