= Jeroen Vervoort =

Dutch rower

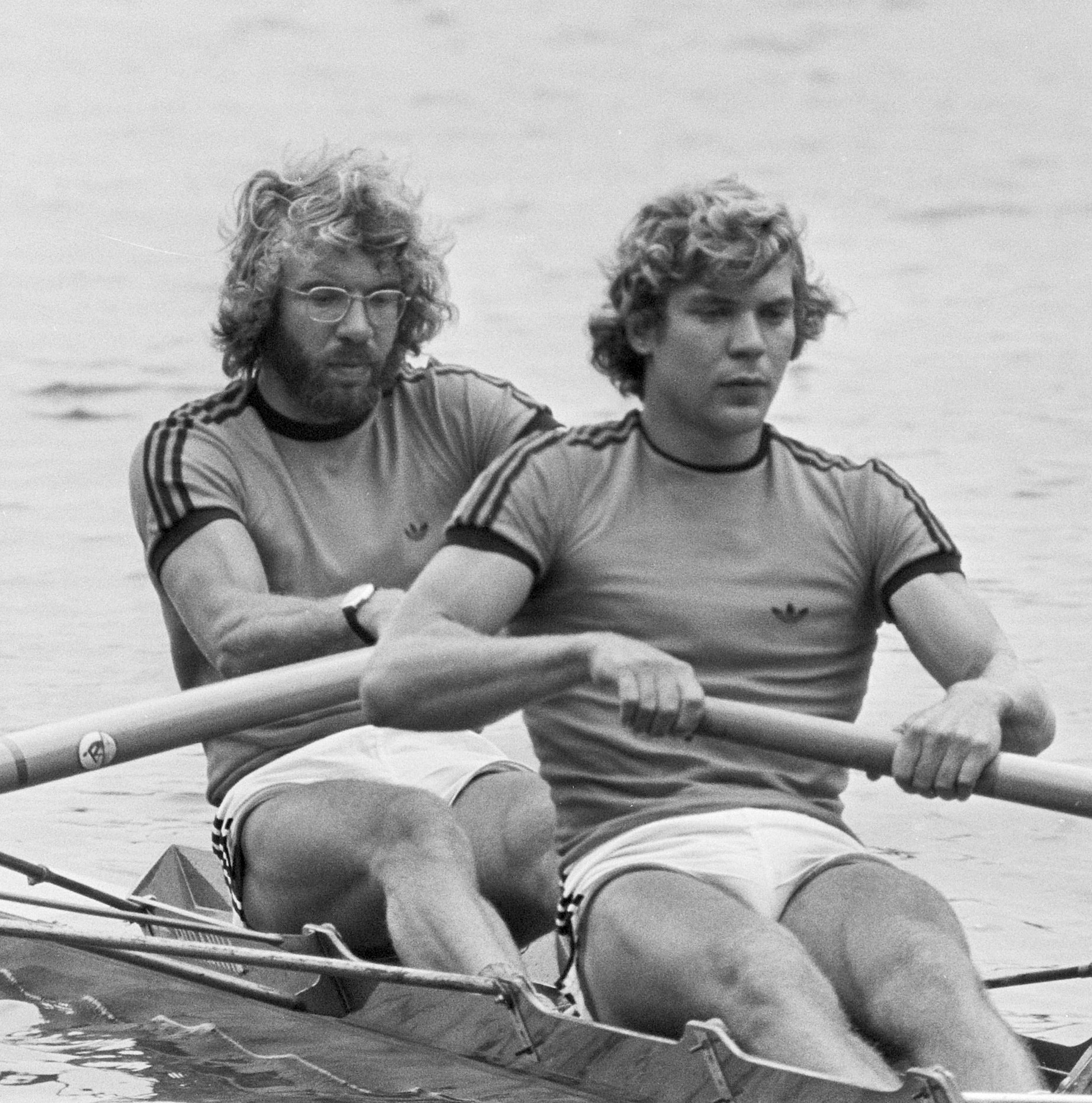
- Ronald and Jeroen Vervoort in 1977

Personal information
- Born: 18 June 1956 (age 70) Tilburg, the Netherlands
- Height: 1.89 m (6 ft 2 in)
- Weight: 86 kg (190 lb)

Sport
- Sport: Rowing
- Club: Nautilus, Rotterdam

Jeroen Vervoort (born 18 June 1956) is a retired Dutch rower. He competed at the 1980 Summer Olympics in the quadruple sculls and finished in eights place, together with Victor Scheffers, Rob Robbers and his elder brother Ronald Vervoort.
