= Ronald Vervoort =

Dutch rower

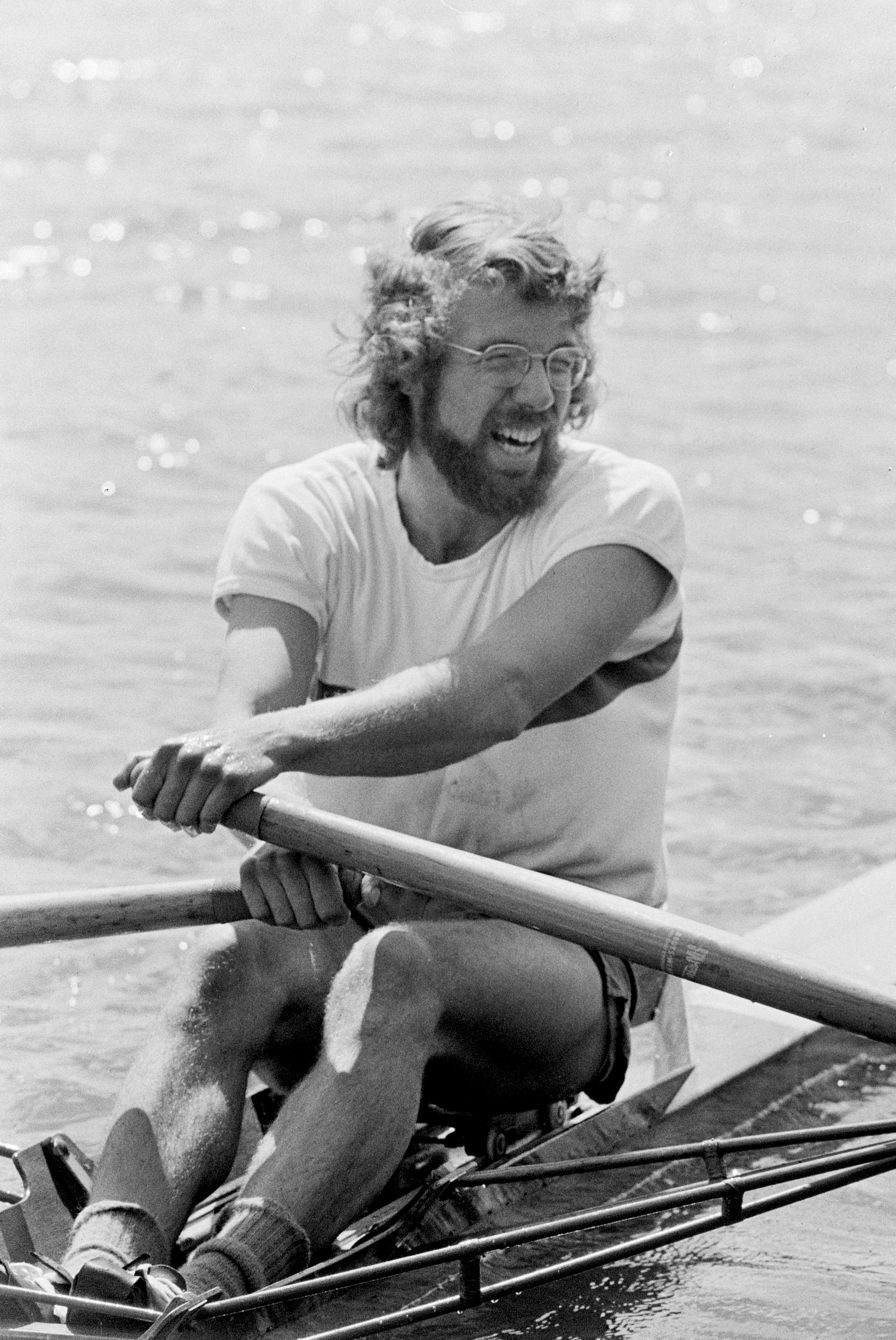
- Ronald Vervoort in 1974

Personal information
- Born: 26 December 1952 (age 73) Leiden, the Netherlands
- Height: 1.83 m (6 ft 0 in)
- Weight: 78 kg (172 lb)

Sport
- Sport: Rowing
- Club: Nautilus, Rotterdam

Ronald Vervoort (born 26 December 1952) is a retired Dutch rower. He competed at the 1980 Summer Olympics in the quadruple sculls and finished in eighth place, together with Victor Scheffers, Rob Robbers and his younger brother Jeroen Vervoort. He also placed fourth, fifth, and sixth in the 1975, 1977, and 1979 World Rowing Championship respectively.

Vervoort retired from competitions shortly after the Games and worked first as a rowing coach and then as a sports physician at his own medical center.
