= Mark Hayter =

British rower

Personal information
- Nationality: British
- Born: 24 October 1949 (age 76)

Sport
- Sport: Rowing
- Club: Leander Club

Mark Hayter (born 24 October 1949) is a retired British rower who competed at the 1976 Summer Olympics.

== Rowing career ==
Hayter won the coxed pairs title rowing for the Kingston and Leander composite, with Richard Ayling, at the 1973 National Rowing Championships. He was selected by Great Britain as part of the quad sculls at the 1975 World Rowing Championships in Nottingham, the quad finished in sixth place in the A final. At the 1976 Olympic Games he rowed as part of the men's quadruple sculls with Andrew Justice, Tom Bishop and Allan Whitwell, the crew finished in ninth place.

== Personal life ==
After a teaching career teaching Spanish and French Hayter moved to Herefordshire and was ordained becoming a parish priest for Hindon with Chicklade and Pertwood.
