= Gotzon Mantuliz =

Spanish designer, model, and TV commentator

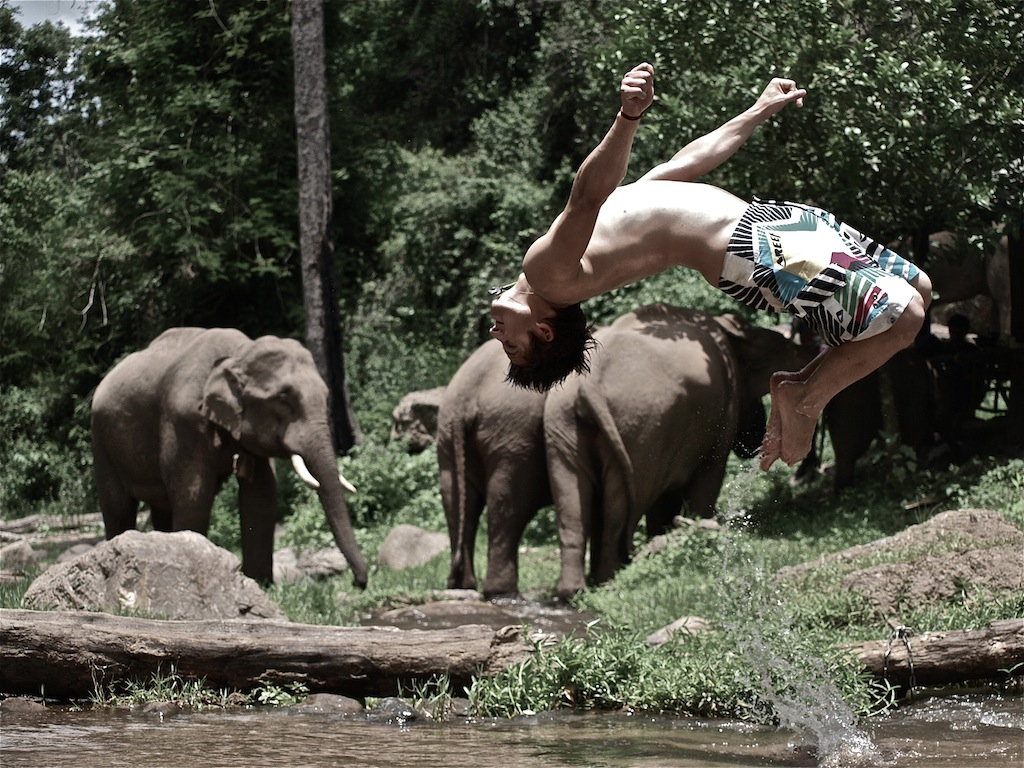
- Mantuliz in 2010
- Born: Gotzon Mantuliz Dudagoitia; August 10, 1988 (age 38); Getxo, Vizcaya, Spain
- Notable work: El Consuistador del Fin del Mundo, El Conquis (Debate), EITB

Comedy career
- Years active: 2009 - present
- Medium: model, designer, adventurer, TV presenter, broadcaster
- Website: http://www.gotzonmantuliz.com

Gotzon Mantuliz Dudagoitia (born August 10, 1988) is a designer, model, TV commentator/presenter and winner of the 5th edition of the well-known Spanish television show “El Conquistador del Fin del Mundo.” Tambien ganador de la Temporada 5 de "El Desafio" emitido en antena 3 mientras que el "Conquistador del mundo" The show is broadcast on ETB2, the second television channel of Euskal Telebista (ETB), the Basque public television channel. Following his success, Dudagoitia started working as a commentator in the debate of “El Conquistador del Fin del Mundo”, called “El Conquis: La Aventura” and directed by Patxi Alonso, a Basque journalist. In 2015 he was premiered as a TV presenter with the program “Safari Wazungu”. He has also published a book called “Gotzon Mantuliz. Diario de un conquistador.”

== Early life and education ==
Gotzon Mantuliz Dudagoitia was born August 10, 1988, in Getxo, Vizcaya, Basque Country, but resides in Berango from his early childhood. He attended primary, secondary and high school education in Gaztelueta in Leioa. He completed his university studies at the School of Nursing of Leioa University of the Basque Country (UPV), from which he holds a diploma in nursing since 2010. When he was 16, he travelled to Ireland for 2 months and worked in a supermarket. He has always combined studies with different type of works.

He has been a painter, worked in a surf shop, as a waiter in a major club in the Basque Country and The Image Club, as a graphic designer and as an adventure travel guide for Marco Polo Club agency, among other things. His interest in clothes and design led him to embark on a new project: the creation of an ecological footprint that is called hakao and which allocates part of the profits to fight for charitable causes in favor of the environment and animals. Travelling has become another of his interests. He has travelled much of Europe, Turkey, Costa Rica, Argentina, Jamaica, Thailand and other remote places.

== El Conquistador del Fin del Mundo 5ª Edición (2009) ==
In 2009, with just 19 years, he joined the most successful program of ETB, El conquistador del fin del mundo. At the broadcasting of the final, up to 500,000 spectators watched the show during the two and a half hours that it lasted. Gotzon became a well-known image in the Basque region, and the audience recognized him as the favorite audience participant with the 85% of votes. Over the next few weeks, Gotzon visited most of the sets of the Basque television, gave interviews to the main news of the Basque Country and his image became an attraction.

== Gotzon Mantuliz. Diario de un conquistador ==
His time in the contest opened doors to new projects, like collecting his experience on the reality of adventure in a book. With the help of Gorka Larrumbide, a basque journalist who shaped the history of the novel, Gotzon published his first novel, “Gotzon Mantuliz. Diario de un Conquistador”, in 2010. It was a best-seller in the Basque Country, being for several weeks in the list of the best selling books and receiving rave reviews from the press.

== Activity as a model ==
His image led him to start modeling, collaborating and working with some of the most important photographers of the time, Lucho Rengifo, Pedro Usabiaga and Carlos Hernandez. Gotzon has collaborated with brands such as Hugo Boss and Xtg, and has been the advertising face of brands such as Vans and Reef. A few years ago now, he participated in solidarity parades as a model posing with clothing for sport brands such as Nike. For two years, he was the face of the launch of the Euskaltel orange shirt for the Tour de France, and has also served as a judge in the Miss and Mister Euskadi contest. Gotzon was image of the advertising campaign conducted by El Diario Vasco lending his image for promotional shirts of “El Conquistador del Fin del Mundo”, which quickly sold out.

== TV collaborations ==
In 2011, he combined his job as a model with working in one of the most successful programs of EITB “El Conquis: La aventura”. Each week he had his own section in the program called “El juego del Conquistador”, which was presented through the website. He received several proposals to participate in Supervivientes (España) 2011, a reality show emitted in Telecinco. However, he rejected the offer because he didn´t like the factors such as visiting other programs of the TV channel that lend themselves to discussion and conflict once the adventure has finished. He travelled with the team of “El Conquistador del Fin del Mundo” to test the activities and interview the participants, which was shown in the debate with his section “GotzON”. In 2015 he was premiered as a TV presenter with the program “Safari Wazungu”, which was cancelled due to its poor ratings.

== AventúraT ==
He created, from its official website a section called 'AventúraT' where his followers propose challenges to overcome. He has already swum between shark has eaten insects in Thailand, was launched into space from a bridge 65 meters carrying Goming, and flown the Biscay coast paragliding.

- Season 1
1. Diving with sharks
2. Thai delicacies
3. Paragliding
4. Puenting and Goming
5. Guarrindongadas with David de Jorge

== Television ==
- El Conquistador del Fin del Mundo (2009)
- "Aconcagua: la aventura" (2010)
- Ni más ni menos (2010)
- Vaya Semanita (2010)
- El Conquis: la aventura (2011)
- El juego del Conquistador (2011)
- Atrápame si puedes (2014)
- Commentator in "El Conquis: la aventura" (2011–Present)
- Safari Wazungu (2015 - 2016)
- Operación Triunfo 2018
- El Desafío 2025

== Bibliography ==
- "Gotzon Mantuliz. Diario de un conquistador" (By Gorka Larrumbide in 2010)
