= Patrick Morineau =

French rower

Personal information
- Nationality: French
- Born: 18 February 1951 (age 74)

Sport
- Sport: Rowing

Patrick Morineau (born 18 February 1951) is a French rower. He competed in the men's quadruple sculls event at the 1976 Summer Olympics.
