= Lyubomir Petrov =

Bulgarian rower (born 1954)

Personal information
- Born: 4 October 1954 (age 71)
- Height: 185 cm (6 ft 1 in)
- Weight: 89 kg (196 lb)

Sport
- Sport: Rowing
Medal record
Men's rowing
Representing Bulgaria
Bronze medal – third place	1980 Moscow	Quadruple sculls
World Championships
Silver medal – second place	1977 Amsterdam	Quadruple sculls

Lyubomir Petrov (Bulgarian: Любомир Петров; born 4 October 1954) is a Bulgarian former rower who competed in the 1980 Summer Olympics.
