= Dimitar Petrov (rower) =

Bulgarian rower

Personal information
- Nationality: Bulgarian
- Born: 8 October 1958 (age 66)

Sport
- Sport: Rowing

Dimitar Petrov (Bulgarian: Димитър Петров, born 8 October 1958) is a Bulgarian rower. He competed in the men's double sculls event at the 1980 Summer Olympics.
