= Neil Halleen =

American rower

Personal information
- Nationality: American
- Born: March 25, 1945 (age 81) Sheboygan, Wisconsin, United States

Sport
- Sport: Rowing

Neil Halleen (born March 25, 1945) is an American rower. He competed in the men's quadruple sculls event at the 1976 Summer Olympics.
