= José Cláudio Lazzarotto =

Brazilian rower

Personal information
- Nationality: Brazilian
- Born: 12 October 1958 (age 66)

Sport
- Sport: Rowing

José Cláudio Lazzarotto (born 12 October 1958) is a Brazilian rower. He competed in the men's quadruple sculls event at the 1980 Summer Olympics.
