= Stoyko Khadilev =

Bulgarian rower

Personal information
- Nationality: Bulgarian
- Born: 12 May 1957 (age 67)

Sport
- Sport: Rowing

Stoyko Khadilev (Bulgarian: Стойко Хадилев; born 12 May 1957) is a Bulgarian rower. He competed in the men's double sculls event at the 1980 Summer Olympics.
