= César Herrera (rower) =

Cuban rower (born 1955)

Personal information
- Full name: César Herrera López
- Nationality: Cuban
- Born: 5 January 1955 (age 71)

Sport
- Sport: Rowing
Medal record
Men's rowing
Representing Cuba
Pan American Games
Gold medal – first place	1979 San Juan	Quadruple sculls
Silver medal – second place	1983 Caracas	Quadruple sculls

César Herrera López (born 5 January 1955) is a Cuban rower. He competed at the 1976 Summer Olympics and the 1980 Summer Olympics.
