= Norbert Kothe =

German rower

Personal information
- Nationality: German
- Born: 1 September 1952 (age 74) Cologne, Germany

Sport
- Sport: Rowing

Norbert Kothe (born 1 September 1952) is a German rower. He competed in the men's quadruple sculls event at the 1976 Summer Olympics.
