= Piotr Tobolski =

Polish rower

Personal information
- Nationality: Polish
- Born: 11 May 1958 (age 66); Gniezno, Poland

Sport
- Sport: Rowing

Piotr Tobolski (born 11 May 1958) is a Polish rower. He competed in the men's double sculls event at the 1980 Summer Olympics.
