= Yuriy Yakimov =

Russian rower (born 1953)

Medal record

Men's rowing

Representing the Soviet Union

Olympic Games
Silver medal – second place	1976 Montreal	Quadruple sculls

World Rowing Championships
Silver medal – second place	1974 Lucerne	Quadruple sculls
Bronze medal – third place	1975 Nottingham	Quadruple sculls

Yuri Aleksandrovich Yakimov (Russian: Юрий Александрович Якимов, born 28 February 1953) is a Russian rower who competed for the Soviet Union in the 1976 Summer Olympics.

In 1976 he was a crew member of the Soviet boat which won the silver medal in the quadruple sculls event.
