= Bruno Flecker =

Austrian rower

Personal information
- Nationality: Austrian
- Born: 14 August 1953 (age 72); Linz, Austria

Sport
- Sport: Rowing

Bruno Flecker (born 14 August 1953) is an Austrian rower. He competed in the men's quadruple sculls event at the 1980 Summer Olympics.
