= Evgeniy Barbakov =

Russian former rower

Medal record

Men's rowing

Representing the Soviet Union

Olympic Games
Silver medal – second place	1980 Moscow	Quadruple sculls

Evgeni Aleksandrovich Barbakov (Russian: Евгений Александрович Барбаков; born 10 June 1954) is a Soviet Russian former rower who competed for the Soviet Union in the 1980 Summer Olympics.

He was born in Rostov-on-Don. In 1980, he was a crew member of the Soviet boat which won the silver medal in the quadruple sculls event.
