= ETB 3 =

ETB3
- Country: Spain; France
- Broadcast area: Basque Country
- Network: ETB
- Headquarters: Bilbao, Basque Country

Programming
- Picture format: 1080i HDTV

Ownership
- Owner: EITB
- Sister channels: ETB 1 ETB 2 ETB 4 ETB Basque

History
- Launched: 10 October 2008; 17 years ago
- Closed: 18 March 2026; 19 days ago
- Replaced by: ETB1 On

Availability

Terrestrial
- Digital: Álava: Channel 45; Biscay: Channel 35; French Basque Country: Channel 33; Gipuzkoa: Channel 48; Navarre: Region of Pamplona: 38; Region of Estella: 24; Region of Tudela: 39; Region of Olite: 31; Region of Sangüesa: 45

ETB 3 (ETB Hiru) was the third television channel from the Euskal Irrati Telebista group in the Basque Autonomous Community, Navarre and the French Basque Country in Spain. The channel broadcast entirely in Basque.

The channel's offer was for children and young people, offering multiple animated and youth fiction series mainly from the Betizu program. It also broadcast cultural spaces, both informative spaces and documentaries and programs of its own production. The channel aimed to retain the young audience in the public television of the Basque Country, with an offer similar to other channels of the same theme, such as SX3 in Catalonia.

== History ==
ETB3 was launched on October 10, 2008 as EiTB's third own channel, replacing Canal Vasco on Basque Country DTT. It was the second Spanish regional channel aimed at children after Super3 in Catalonia.

On March 16, 2026, it was announced that from March 18, the channel would change its name to ETB1 On, modifying its programming with a mix of content from the former ETB3, as well as from ETB1, including its news programs. Furthermore, from that same day, ETB1 On became the channel's fully Basque-language version, available on streaming platforms and the internet. On March 17th, an online petition was launched to overturn this decision by the Basque Government and EITB, arguing that many children would lose the opportunity for public and universal access to a children's channel in Basque.

== Programming ==
The channel was created with the aim of retaining a new audience to the EiTB channels, so its programming was aimed at children, and most of its programming was cartoons. The channel broadcast in Basque language. Previously, the channel also broadcasts some cultural and entertainment programs aimed at a teenage audience.
