= Frank Dundr =

German rower

Personal information
- Born: Frank Butz; 25 January 1957 (age 69) Sonneberg, East Germany

Sport
- Sport: Rowing
- Club: SC Dynamo Berlin; Sportvereinigung (SV) Dynamo
Medal record
Men's rowing
Representing East Germany
Olympic Games
Gold medal – first place	1980 Moscow	Quadruple sculls
World Rowing Championships
Gold medal – first place	1977 Amsterdam	Quadruple sculls

Frank Dundr (né Butz; born 25 January 1957) is a German rower, who competed for the SC Dynamo Berlin / Sportvereinigung (SV) Dynamo.

Butz was born in 1957. He married in 1977 and took on his wife's surname Dundr.

He won the medals at the international rowing competitions. In February 1978, he was given two sports awards: Master of Sport and Honored Master of Sports.
