= Roberto Quintero =

Cuban rower (born 1959)

Personal information
- Full name: Roberto Quintero Montes de Oca
- Nationality: Cuban
- Born: 16 October 1959 (age 66) Santa Clara
- Died: 31/10/2023 Santa Marta, Varadero, Cuba

Sport
- Sport: Rowing
Medal record
Oro San Juan Puerto Rico Juegos Panamericanos
Men's rowing
Representing Cuba
Pan American Games
Gold medal – first place	1979 San Juan	Quadruple sculls

Roberto Quintero Montes de Oca (born 16 October 1959) is a Cuban rower. He competed in the men's quadruple sculls event at the 1980 Summer Olympics.
