= Eftim Gerzilov =

Bulgarian rower

Personal information
- Nationality: Bulgarian
- Born: 2 December 1952 (age 72)

Sport
- Sport: Rowing

Eftim Gerzilov (Bulgarian: Евтим Герзилов, born 2 December 1952) is a Bulgarian rower. He competed in the men's quadruple sculls event at the 1976 Summer Olympics.
