= Stanisław Wierzbicki =

Polish rower

Personal information
- Nationality: Polish
- Born: 13 May 1959; Drobin, Poland
- Died: 10 December 2018 (aged 59)

Sport
- Sport: Rowing

Stanisław Wierzbicki (13 May 1959 – 10 December 2018) was a Polish rower. He competed in the men's quadruple sculls event at the 1980 Summer Olympics.
