= Klaus Kröppelien =

German rower (born 1958)

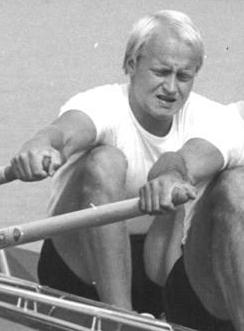
- Kröppelien in 1982

Medal record

Men's rowing

Representing East Germany

Olympic Games
Gold medal – first place	1980 Moscow	Double sculls

Friendship Games
Gold medal – first place	1984 Moscow	Quad sculls

Klaus Kröppelien (born 29 June 1958) is a German rower who competed for East Germany in the 1980 Summer Olympics.

He was born in Rostock. In 1980 he and his partner Joachim Dreifke won the gold medal in the double sculls competition.
