= Reto Wyss =

Swiss rower (born 1952)

Personal information
- Nationality: Swiss
- Born: 22 May 1952 (age 74)

Sport
- Sport: Rowing

Reto Wyss (born 22 May 1952) is a Swiss rower. He competed in the men's quadruple sculls event at the 1976 Summer Olympics.
