= Horacio Cabrera =

Cuban rower (born 1958)

Personal information
- Full name: Horacio Cabrera Mesa
- Nationality: Cuban
- Born: 7 September 1958 (age 67)

Sport
- Sport: Rowing
Medal record
Men's rowing
Representing Cuba
Pan American Games
Bronze medal – third place	1979 San Juan	Double sculls

Horacio Cabrera Mesa (born 7 September 1958) is a Cuban rower. He competed in the men's quadruple sculls event at the 1980 Summer Olympics.
