= Bogdan Dobrev =

Bulgarian rower (born 1957)

Personal information
- Born: 29 July 1957 (age 68)

Sport
- Sport: Rowing
Medal record
Men's rowing
Representing Bulgaria
Olympic Games
Bronze medal – third place	1980 Moskva	Quadruple sculls
World Championships
Bronze medal – third place	1977 Amsterdam	Quadruple sculls

Bogdan Dobrev (Bulgarian: Богдан Добрев; born 29 July 1957) is a Bulgarian former rower who competed in the 1980 Summer Olympics.
