= Helmut Krause =

German rower

Personal information
- Nationality: German
- Born: 5 May 1954 (age 70); Berlin, Germany

Sport
- Sport: Rowing

Helmut Krause (born 5 May 1954) is a German rower. He competed in the men's quadruple sculls event at the 1976 Summer Olympics.
