= Kenneth Foote =

American rower and engineer

Personal information
- Born: August 2, 1948 (age 76); Baltimore, Maryland, United States

Sport
- Sport: Rowing

Kenneth Foote (born August 2, 1948) from the Woods Hole Oceanographic Institution, Woods Hole, MA was named Fellow of the Institute of Electrical and Electronics Engineers (IEEE) in 2015 for contributions to quantification of underwater sound scattering. He also competed in the men's quadruple sculls event at the 1976 Summer Olympics.
