= Zbigniew Andruszkiewicz =

Polish rower

Personal information
- Nationality: Polish
- Born: 1 November 1959 (age 65); Gdańsk, Poland

Sport
- Sport: Rowing

Zbigniew Andruszkiewicz (born 1 November 1959) is a Polish rower. He competed in the men's quadruple sculls event at the 1980 Summer Olympics.
