= Carsten Bunk =

German rower

Olympic medal record

Men's rowing
Gold medal – first place	1980 Moscow	Quadruple sculls

Carsten Bunk (born 29 February 1960) is a German rower who competed for East Germany in the 1980 Summer Olympics.

He was born in Berlin.

In 1980 he was a crew member of the East German boat which won the gold medal in the quadruple sculls event.
