= Nelson Simon =

Cuban rower (born 1954)

Personal information
- Full name: Nelson Simon Hernández
- Nationality: Cuban
- Born: 4 March 1954 (age 72)

Sport
- Sport: Rowing
Medal record
Men's rowing
Representing Cuba
Pan American Games
Gold medal – first place	1975 Mexico City	Quadruple sculls
Gold medal – first place	1979 San Juan	Quadruple sculls

Nelson Simon Hernández (born 4 March 1954) is a Cuban rower. He competed at the 1976 Summer Olympics and the 1980 Summer Olympics.
