= Ole Bloch Jensen =

Danish rower

Personal information
- Nationality: Danish
- Born: 26 February 1943 (age 82); Copenhagen, Denmark

Sport
- Sport: Rowing

Ole Bloch Jensen (born 26 February 1943) is a Danish rower. He competed in the men's quadruple sculls event at the 1980 Summer Olympics.
