= Nikola Stefanović =

Yugoslav rower

Personal information
- Nationality: Yugoslav
- Born: 18 January 1960 (age 65)

Sport
- Sport: Rowing

Nikola Stefanović (born 18 January 1960) is a Yugoslav rower. He competed in the men's quadruple sculls event at the 1980 Summer Olympics.
