= Morten Espersen =

Danish rower

Personal information
- Nationality: Danish
- Born: 21 June 1951 (age 73); Hvidovre, Denmark

Sport
- Sport: Rowing

Morten Espersen (born 21 June 1951) is a Danish rower. He competed in the men's quadruple sculls event at the 1980 Summer Olympics.
