= Darko Zibar =

Croatian rower

Personal information
- Nationality: Croatian
- Born: 4 September 1958 (age 66); Osijek, Yugoslavia

Sport
- Sport: Rowing

Darko Zibar (born 4 September 1958) is a Croatian rower. He competed in the men's quadruple sculls event at the 1980 Summer Olympics.
