= Václav Vochoska =

Czech rower (born 1955)

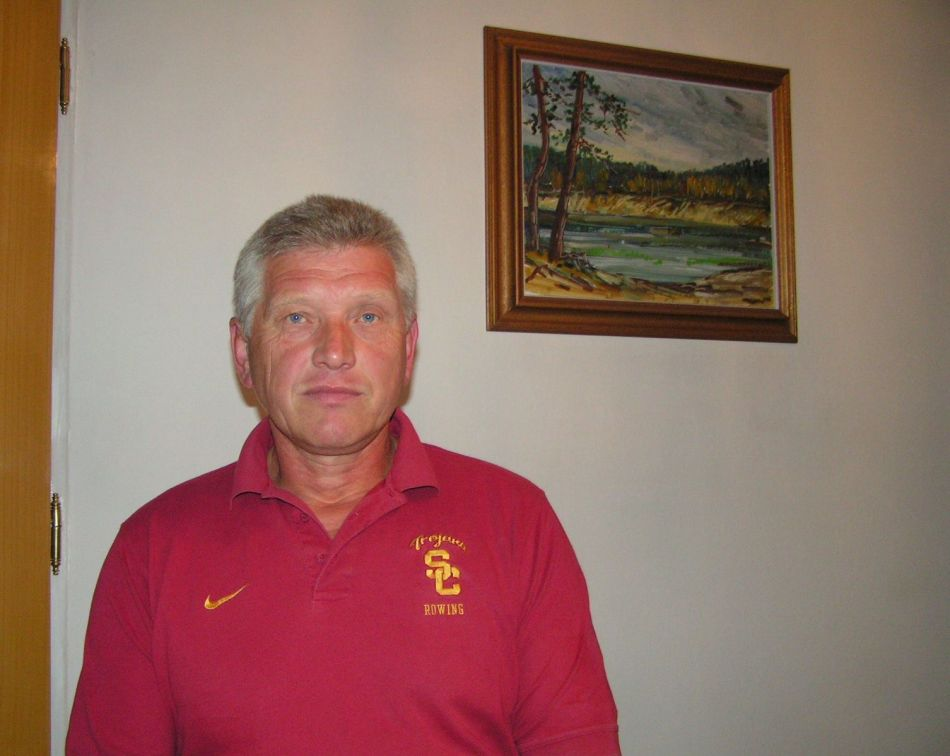

Personal information
- Born: July 26, 1955 (age 70) České Budějovice, Czechoslovakia

Sport
- Country: Czechoslovakia
- Sport: Rowing
Medal record
Men's rowing
Representing Czechoslovakia
Olympic Games
| Bronze medal – third place | 1976 Montreal | Quadruple sculls |
| Bronze medal – third place | 1980 Moscow | Double sculls |
World Rowing Championships
| Silver medal – second place | 1975 Nottingham | Quadruple sculls |
| Silver medal – second place | 1977 Amsterdam | Quadruple sculls |

Václav Vochoska (born 26 July 1955) is a Czech rower who competed for Czechoslovakia in the 1976 Summer Olympics and in the 1980 Summer Olympics.

He was born in České Budějovice. In 1976, he was a crew member of the Czechoslovak boat which won the bronze medal in the quadruple sculls event. Four years later he won his second bronze medal this time with his partner Zdeněk Pecka in the double sculls competition.
