= Francisco Rodríguez (rower) =

Cuban rower (born 1953)

Personal information
- Full name: Francisco Rodríguez Márquez
- Nationality: Cuban
- Born: 19 May 1953 (age 73)

Sport
- Sport: Rowing
Medal record
Men's rowing
Representing Cuba
Pan American Games
Gold medal – first place	1975 Mexico City	Quadruple sculls
Bronze medal – third place	1979 San Juan	Double sculls

Francisco Rodríguez Márquez (born 19 May 1953) is a Cuban rower. He competed in the men's quadruple sculls event at the 1976 Summer Olympics.
