= Rüdiger Reiche =

East German rower

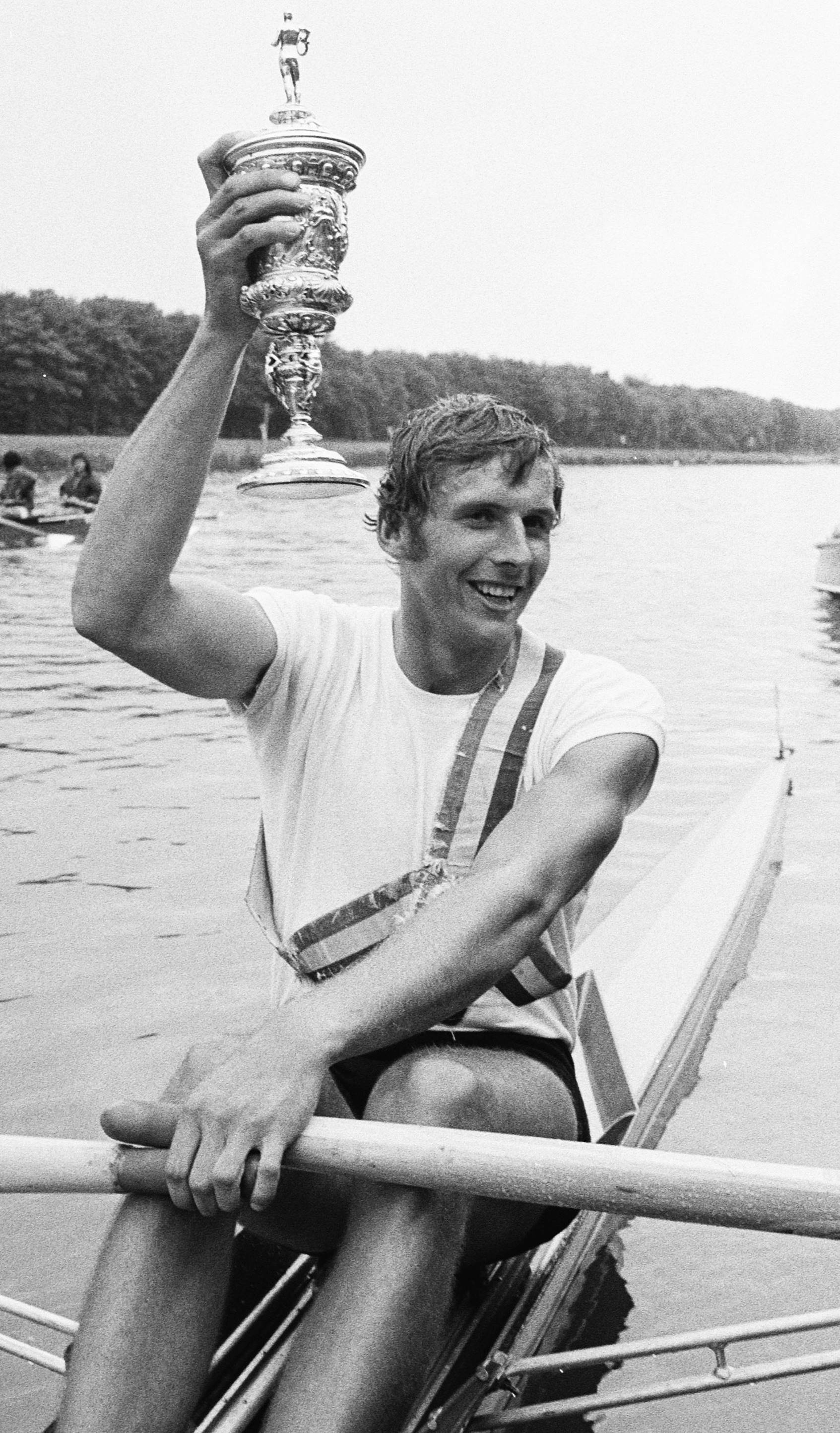
- Reiche in 1972

Personal information
- Born: 27 March 1955 (age 71) Querfurt, Bezirk Halle, East Germany
- Height: 1.98 m (6 ft 6 in)
- Weight: 96 kg (212 lb)

Sport
- Sport: Rowing
- Club: Sportclub Chemie Halle; Sportclub Dynamo Potsdam
Medal record
Men's rowing
Representing East Germany
Olympic Games
Gold medal – first place	1976 Montreal	Quadruple sculls
World Rowing Championships
Gold medal – first place	1974 Lucerne	Quadruple sculls
Gold medal – first place	1982 Lucerne	Single sculls
Silver medal – second place	1977 Amsterdam	Double sculls
Silver medal – second place	1978 Hamilton	Single sculls
Silver medal – second place	1981 Munich	Single sculls
Silver medal – second place	1983 Duisburg	Quadruple sculls
Silver medal – second place	1985 Hazewinkel	Quadruple sculls
Bronze medal – third place	1979 Bled	Single sculls

Rüdiger Reiche (born 27 March 1955) is a retired German rower and a 1976 Olympic champion in the quadruple sculls. Between 1974 and 1985 he won eight medals in single, double and quadruple scull events at the world championships, including two gold medals. After retiring from competitions he worked as a rowing coach at the club and national levels, training Daniel Haudoerfer and Hubert Trzybinski.
