= Cirilo Suárez =

Cuban rower

Personal information
- Full name: Cirilo Suárez González
- Nationality: Cuban
- Born: 18 March 1956 (age 69)

Sport
- Sport: Rowing

Cirilo Suárez González (born 18 March 1956) is a Cuban rower. He competed in the men's quadruple sculls event at the 1976 Summer Olympics.
