= Peter Cortes =

American rower (born 1947)

Personal information
- Nationality: American
- Born: September 7, 1947 (age 78) Orange, New Jersey, United States

Sport
- Sport: Rowing

Peter Cortes (born September 7, 1947) is an American rower. He competed in the men's quadruple sculls event at the 1976 Summer Olympics.
