= Michael Gentsch =

German rower

Personal information
- Nationality: German
- Born: 30 December 1955 (age 69); Taufkirchen, Germany

Sport
- Sport: Rowing

Michael Gentsch (born 30 December 1955) is a German rower. He competed in the men's quadruple sculls event at the 1976 Summer Olympics.
