= Ivo Rusev =

Bulgarian rower (born 1962)

Olympic medal record

Men's rowing

Representing Bulgaria
Bronze medal – third place	1980 Moskva	Quadruple sculls

Ivo Rusev (Bulgarian: Иво Русев; born 14 June 1962) is a Bulgarian former rower who competed in the 1980 Summer Olympics.
