= Valeriy Kleshnyov =

Soviet rower

Olympic medal record

Men's rowing

Representing the Soviet Union
Silver medal – second place	1980 Moscow	Quadruple sculls

World Rowing Championships
Bronze medal – third place	1982 Lucerne	Quadruple sculls

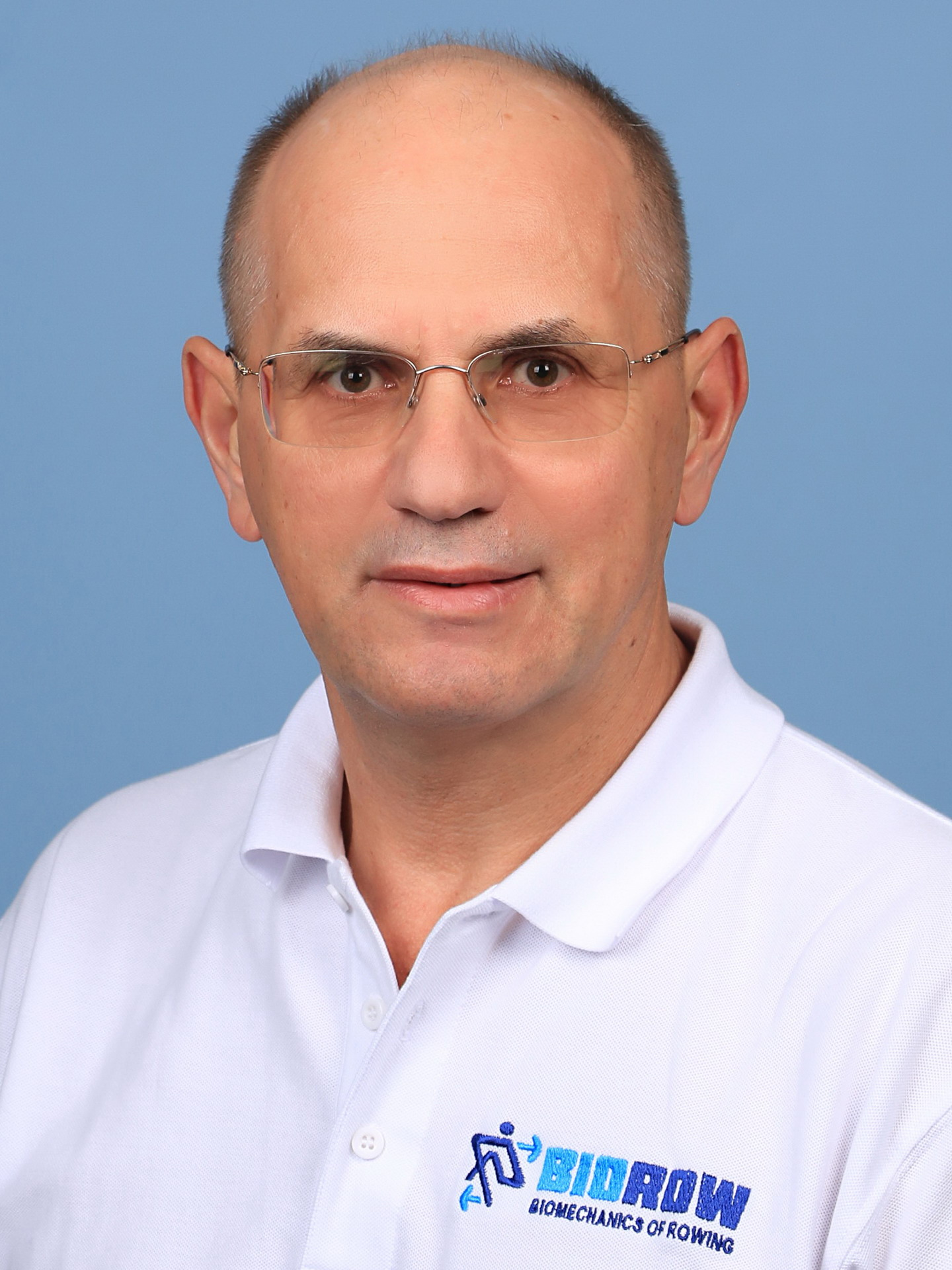
Valeriy Kleshnyov

Valery Vladimirovich Kleshnev (Russian: Валерий Владимирович Клешнёв, born 15 October 1958) is a Russian former rower who competed for the Soviet Union in the 1980 Summer Olympics.

In 1980 he was a crew member of the Soviet boat which won the silver medal in the quadruple sculls event.
