= Rainer Holzhaider =

Austrian rower

Personal information
- Nationality: Austrian
- Born: 2 August 1956 (age 68); Gmunden, Austria

Sport
- Sport: Rowing

Rainer Holzhaider (born 2 August 1956) is an Austrian rower. He competed in the men's quadruple sculls event at the 1980 Summer Olympics.
