= Zdeněk Pecka =

Czech rower (1954–2024)

- Zdeněk Pecka in 2021

Personal information
- Born: 6 February 1954 Litoměřice, Czechoslovakia
- Died: 30 January 2024 (aged 69)
- Height: 193 cm (6 ft 4 in)
- Weight: 88 kg (194 lb)
- Spouse: Květa Jeriová

Sport
- Sport: Rowing
Medal record
Men's rowing
Representing Czechoslovakia
Olympic Games
| Bronze medal – third place | 1976 Montreal | Quadruple sculls |
| Bronze medal – third place | 1980 Moscow | Double sculls |
World Rowing Championships
| Silver medal – second place | 1975 Nottingham | Quadruple sculls |
| Silver medal – second place | 1977 Amsterdam | Quadruple sculls |
| Bronze medal – third place | 1974 Lucerne | Quadruple sculls |

Zdeněk Pecka (6 February 1954 – 30 January 2024) was a Czech rower who competed for Czechoslovakia in the 1976 Summer Olympics and in the 1980 Summer Olympics.

== Biography ==
Pecka was born in Litoměřice. In 1976 he was a crew member of the Czechoslovak boat which won the bronze medal in the quadruple sculls event. Four years later he won his second bronze medal this time with his partner Václav Vochoska in the double sculls competition.

Pecka was the coach of Olympic silver medalist Václav Chalupa. He was married to Květa Jeriová. Pecka died on 30 January 2024, at the age of 69.
