= ETB 4 =

ETB4
- Country: Spain
- Broadcast area: Basque Country
- Network: ETB
- Headquarters: Bilbao, Basque Country

Programming
- Picture format: 1080i HDTV

Ownership
- Owner: EITB
- Sister channels: ETB 1 ETB 2 ETB 3 ETB Basque

History
- Launched: 29 October 2014; 11 years ago
- Closed: 18 March 2026; 21 days ago
- Replaced by: ETB2 On

Availability

Terrestrial
- Digital: Álava: Channel 45; Biscay: Channel 35; French Basque Country: Channel 33; Gipuzkoa: Channel 48

ETB 4 (ETB Lau) was the fourth television channel from the Euskal Irrati Telebista group in the Basque Autonomous Community in Spain and the French Basque Country. The channel broadcast in Basque and Spanish.

== History ==
In 2007, ETB announced the launch of ETB4, a channel in Basque and Spanish that would be dedicated to information and culture, in a similar way to La 2 and El 33, however, the project was discarded due to the 2008 financial crisis. Instead of ETB 4, ETBK Sat was programmed, the new interim channel combined sports broadcasts with programs from ETB 1 and ETB 2 that were broadcast on ETB Sat.

ETB 4 was launched on October 29, 2014, replacing ETBK Sat on the Basque Country without there being a previous announcement of the change of identity of the channel.

On March 16, 2026, it was announced that from March 18, the channel would change its name to ETB2 On, modifying its programming with a mix of content from the former ETB4, as well as from ETB2, including its news programs. Furthermore, from that same day, ETB2 On became the channel's fully Basque-language version, available on streaming platforms and the internet.

== Programming ==
ETB 4 programming was based on entertainment, highlighting fiction, sports and reruns of ETB 1 and ETB 2 programs.
