= Yuriy Shapochka =

Soviet rower

Olympic medal record

Men's rowing

Representing the Soviet Union
Silver medal – second place	1980 Moscow	Quadruple sculls

Yuriy Pavlovich Shapochka (Ukrainian: Юрій Павлович Шапочка, born 19 September 1952) is a Ukrainian rower who competed for the Soviet Union in the 1980 Summer Olympics.

In 1980, he was a crew member of the Soviet boat which won the silver medal in the quadruple sculls event.
