= York Langerfeld =

Canadian rower

Personal information
- Nationality: Canadian
- Born: 8 January 1953 (age 72); Hamburg, Germany

Sport
- Sport: Rowing

York Langerfeld (born 8 January 1953) is a Canadian rower. He competed in the men's quadruple sculls event at the 1976 Summer Olympics.
