= Joachim Dreifke =

German rower

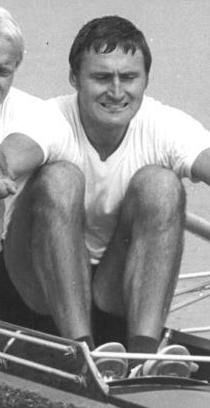
- Dreifke in 1982.

Medal record

Men's rowing

Representing East Germany

Olympic Games
Gold medal – first place	1980 Moscow	Double sculls
Bronze medal – third place	1976 Montreal	Single sculls

World Rowing Championships
Gold medal – first place	1974 Lucerne	Quadruple sculls
Silver medal – second place	1975 Nottingham	Double sculls
Gold medal – first place	1977 Amsterdam	Single sculls
Gold medal – first place	1981 Munich	Double sculls

Joachim Dreifke (born 26 December 1952) is a German rower who competed for East Germany in the 1976 Summer Olympics and in the 1980 Summer Olympics.

He was born in Greifswald. In 1976 he won the bronze medal in the Olympic single sculls event. Four years later he and his partner Klaus Kröppelien won the gold medal in the Olympic double sculls competition.
