= Khristo Zhelev =

Bulgarian rower

Personal information
- Nationality: Bulgarian
- Born: 3 October 1947 (age 78)

Sport
- Sport: Rowing
Medal record
Men's rowing
Representing Bulgaria
World Championships
Silver medal – second place	1977 Amsterdam	Quadruple sculls

Khristo Zhelev (Bulgarian: Христо Желев, born 3 October 1947) is a Bulgarian rower. He competed in the men's quadruple sculls event at the 1976 Summer Olympics.
