= Christian Marquis =

French rower

Personal information
- Nationality: French
- Born: 20 October 1953 (age 71)

Sport
- Sport: Rowing

Christian Marquis (born 20 October 1953) is a French rower. He competed in the men's quadruple sculls event at the 1980 Summer Olympics.
