= Michael Wolfgramm =

East German rower

Personal information
- Born: 8 March 1953 (age 73) Schwerin, East Germany
- Height: 180 cm (5 ft 11 in)
- Weight: 85 kg (187 lb)

Sport
- Sport: Rowing
- Club: SC Dynamo Berlin
Medal record
Men's rowing
Representing East Germany
Olympic Games
Gold medal – first place	1976 Montreal	Quadruple sculls

Michael Wolfgramm (born 8 March 1953) is a German rower who competed for the SC Dynamo Berlin / Sportvereinigung (SV) Dynamo. He won the medals at the international rowing competitions for East Germany.
