= Andrzej Skowroński =

Polish rower (1953–2020)

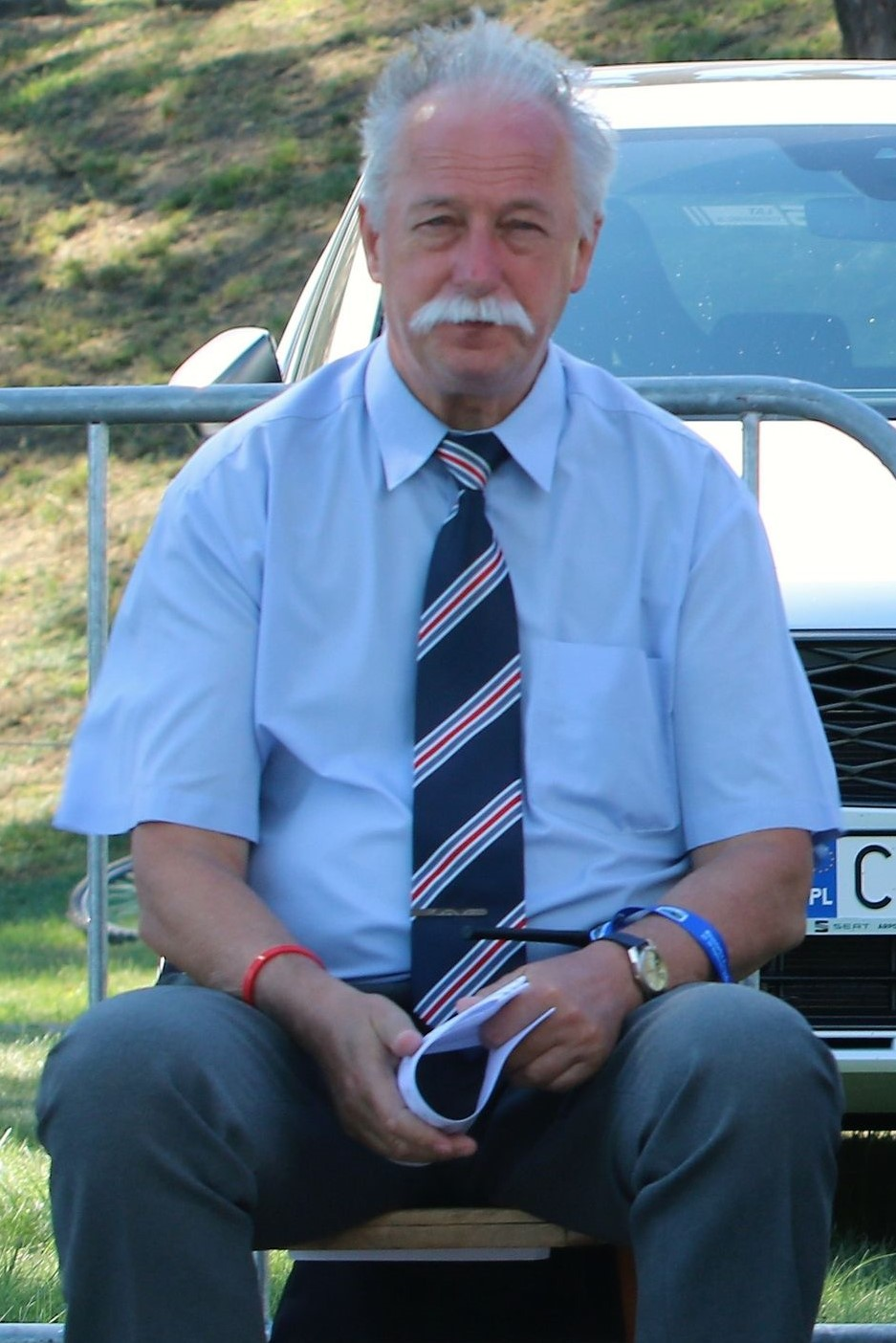

Personal information
- Nationality: Polish
- Born: 16 November 1953 Kraków, Poland
- Died: 10 December 2020 (aged 67)

Sport
- Sport: Rowing

Andrzej Skowroński (16 November 1953 – 10 December 2020) was a Polish rower. He competed in the men's quadruple sculls event at the 1980 Summer Olympics.

== Biography ==
In 1974, he graduated from the Powstańców Śląskich (Silesian Insurgents) Technical High School in Kraków and took up studies at the Academy of Physical Education. He was a representative of the AZS-AWF club in Kraków.

== Sports ==
1979 – 8th place during the World Championships in Bled (double fours, in a team with A. Bocianowski, Ryszard Burak, Wieslaw Kujda).

1980 – 7th place during the Olympic Games in Moscow, in the quad together with Ryszard Burak, Zbigniew Andruszkiewicz and Stanislaw Wierzbicki – 6th place in the prelims (6:27.24), 5th place in the repechages (6:16.69), 1st place in the B final (5:58.63).
