= Reiner Modest =

Danish rower

Personal information
- Nationality: Danish
- Born: 6 July 1949 (age 75); Frederiksberg, Denmark

Sport
- Sport: Rowing

Reiner Modest (born 6 July 1949) is a Danish rower. He competed in the men's quadruple sculls event at the 1980 Summer Olympics.
