= Joan Solano =

Spanish rower

Personal information
- Full name: Joan Solano Bustamante
- Nationality: Spanish
- Born: 5 May 1953 (age 71)

Sport
- Sport: Rowing

Joan Solano Bustamante (born 5 May 1953) is a Spanish rower. He competed in the men's quadruple sculls event at the 1980 Summer Olympics.
