= Louis Prévost =

Canadian rower

Personal information
- Born: 17 January 1954 (age 71) Montreal, Quebec, Canada

Sport
- Sport: Rowing

Louis-Étienne Prévost (born 17 January 1954) is a Canadian former rower. He competed in the men's quadruple sculls event at the 1976 Summer Olympics. He was born in Montreal.

After retiring from rowing, he took up hiking, and has hiked the Triple Crown of Hiking: the Appalachian Trail, the Pacific Crest Trail, and the Continental Divide Trail. He has also hiked the GR 20. He has two children named Charles and Noémie.
