= André Renart =

Canadian rower

Personal information
- Born: 8 December 1950 (age 74); Drummondville, Quebec, Canada

Sport
- Sport: Rowing

André Renart (born 8 December 1950) is a Canadian rower. He competed in the men's quadruple sculls event at the 1976 Summer Olympics.
