= Aivars Lazdenieks =

Latvian rower (1954–2023)

Personal information
- Born: 26 February 1954 Skrunda, Latvian SSR, USSR
- Died: 20 August 2023 (aged 69)
Medal record
Men's rowing
Representing the Soviet Union
Olympic Games
Silver medal – second place	1976 Montreal	Quadruple sculls
World Rowing Championships
Bronze medal – third place	1975 Nottingham	Quadruple sculls

Aivars Lazdenieks (26 February 1954 – 20 August 2023) was a Latvian rower who competed for the Soviet Union in the 1976 Summer Olympics.

In 1976 he was a crew member of the Soviet boat which won the silver medal in the quadruple sculls event.

Lazdenieks died on 20 August 2023, at the age of 69.
