= José Luis Corta =

Spanish rower

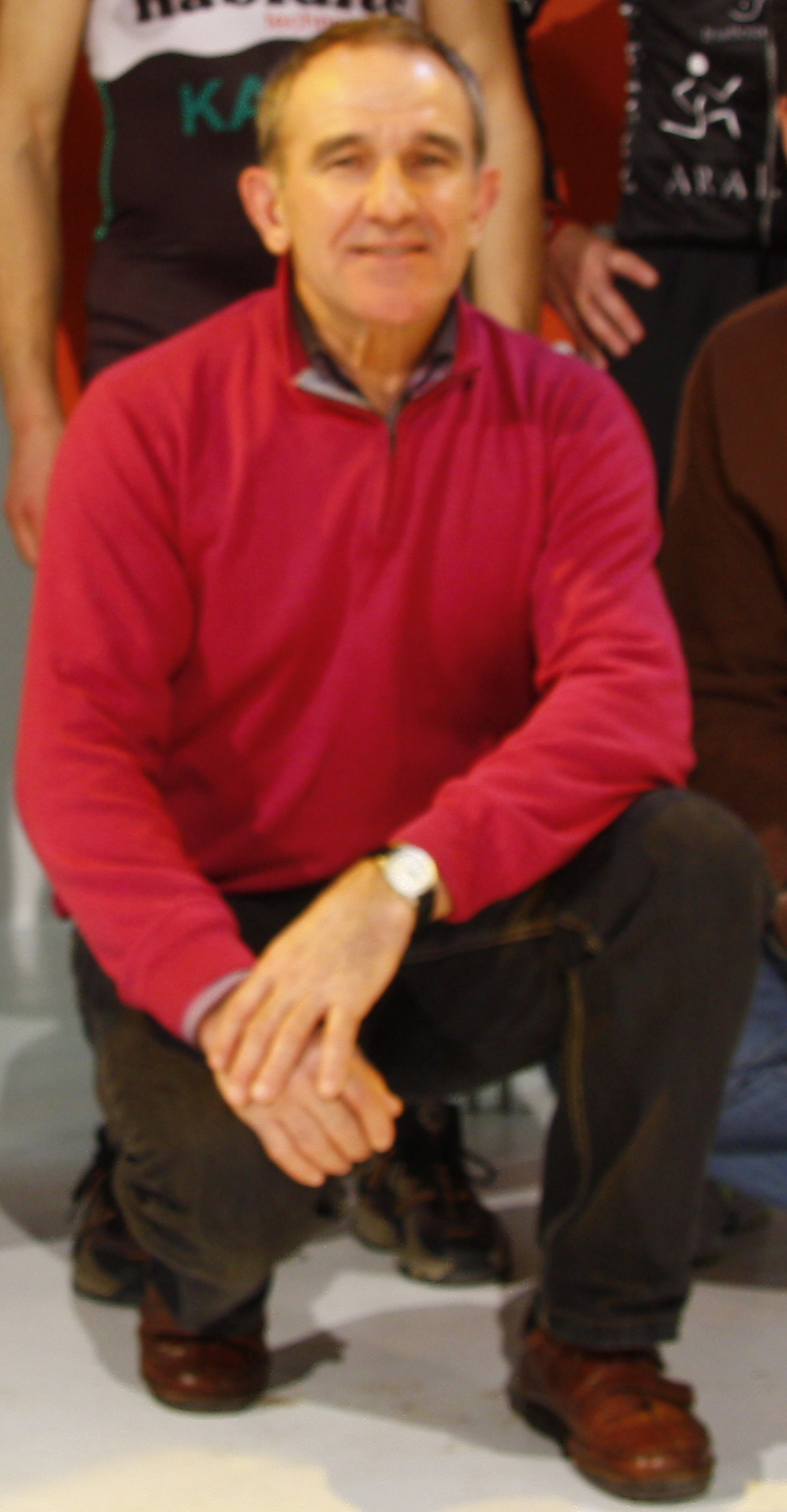
- José Luis Corta

Personal information
- Nationality: Spanish
- Born: 25 April 1949 (age 75)

Sport
- Sport: Rowing

José Luis Corta (born 25 April 1949) is a Spanish rower. He competed in the men's double sculls event at the 1980 Summer Olympics.
