= Louis Bourassa =

Canadian rower

Personal information
- Born: 20 November 1954 (age 70); Montreal, Quebec, Canada

Sport
- Sport: Rowing

Louis Bourassa (French pronunciation: [lwi buʁasa]; born 20 November 1954) is a Canadian rower. He competed in the men's quadruple sculls event at the 1976 Summer Olympics. He graduated from HEC Montréal in 1982 with an MBA degree and is currently Senior Vice President for Fiera Capital, a Canadian asset management firm headquartered in Montreal.

== Personal life ==
His daughter, Nikki Bourassa is also a rower and competed for Columbia University from 2009 to 2013. She was a staff member at the Berkman Klein Center for Internet & Society at Harvard University.
