= Helmut Wolber =

German rower

Personal information
- Nationality: German
- Born: 6 July 1947 (age 77); Cologne, Germany

Sport
- Sport: Rowing

Helmut Wolber (born 6 July 1947) is a German rower. He competed in the men's quadruple sculls event at the 1976 Summer Olympics.
