= Martin Winter (rower) =

East German rower

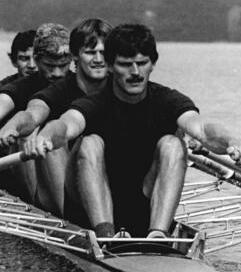
- Martin Winter (front) in 1982

Personal information
- Born: 5 November 1955 Zerbst, East Germany
- Died: 21 February 1988 (aged 32) Magdeburg, East Germany
- Height: 194 cm (6 ft 4 in)
- Weight: 91 kg (201 lb)

Sport
- Sport: Rowing
- Club: SC Magdeburg
Medal record
Men's rowing
Representing East Germany
Olympic Games
Gold medal – first place	1980 Moscow	Quadruple sculls
World Rowing Championships
Gold medal – first place	1977 Amsterdam	Quadruple sculls
Gold medal – first place	1978 Cambridge	Quadruple sculls
Gold medal – first place	1981 Munich	Quadruple sculls
Gold medal – first place	1982 Lucerne	Quadruple sculls
Bronze medal – third place	1975 Nottingham	Single sculls
Bronze medal – third place	1979 Bled	Double sculls

Martin Winter (5 November 1955 – 21 February 1988) was a German rower who competed for East Germany in the 1980 Summer Olympics.

He was born in Zerbst in 1955. In 1980 he was a crew member of the East German boat that won the gold medal in the quadruple sculls event. He died in Magdeburg in 1988 at age 32 from the consequences of an accident.
