= Siegfried Sageder =

Austrian rower

Personal information
- Nationality: Austrian
- Born: 30 July 1957 (age 67); Linz, Austria

Sport
- Sport: Rowing

Siegfried Sageder (born 30 July 1957) is an Austrian rower. He competed in the men's quadruple sculls event at the 1980 Summer Olympics.
