= Wiesław Kujda =

Polish rower

Personal information
- Nationality: Polish
- Born: 25 November 1955 (age 69); Warsaw, Poland

Sport
- Sport: Rowing

Wiesław Kujda (born 25 November 1955) is a Polish rower. He competed in two events at the 1980 Summer Olympics.
