= Waldemar Trombetta =

Brazilian rower

Personal information
- Nationality: Brazilian
- Born: 25 July 1954 (age 71)

Sport
- Sport: Rowing

Waldemar Trombetta (born 25 July 1954) is a Brazilian rower. He competed at the 1980 Summer Olympics and the 1988 Summer Olympics.
