= Michael Sageder =

Austrian rower

Personal information
- Nationality: Austrian
- Born: 27 April 1959 (age 65); Linz, Austria

Sport
- Sport: Rowing

Michael Sageder (born 27 April 1959) is an Austrian rower. He competed in the men's quadruple sculls event at the 1980 Summer Olympics.
