= Karl-Heinz Bußert =

East German rower (born 1955)

- Bußert in 1982

Personal information
- Born: 8 January 1955 (age 71) Kirchmöser, East Germany
Medal record
Men's rowing
Representing East Germany
Olympic Games
Gold medal – first place	1976 Montreal	Quadruple sculls
Friendship Games
Gold medal – first place	1984 Moscow	Quadruple sculls
World Rowing Championships
Gold medal – first place	1977 Amsterdam	Quadruple sculls
Gold medal – first place	1978 Cambridge	Quadruple sculls
Gold medal – first place	1979 Bled	Quadruple sculls
Gold medal – first place	1981 Munich	Quadruple sculls
Gold medal – first place	1982 Lucerne	Quadruple sculls

Karl-Heinz Bußert (born 8 January 1955) is a German rower who competed for East Germany in the 1976 Summer Olympics.

He was born in Kirchmöser. In 1976, he was a crew member of the East German boat which won the gold medal in the quadruple sculls event. He competed for the SG Dynamo Potsdam / Sportvereinigung (SV) Dynamo.
