= Urtzi Urrutikoetxea =

Basque writer and journalist

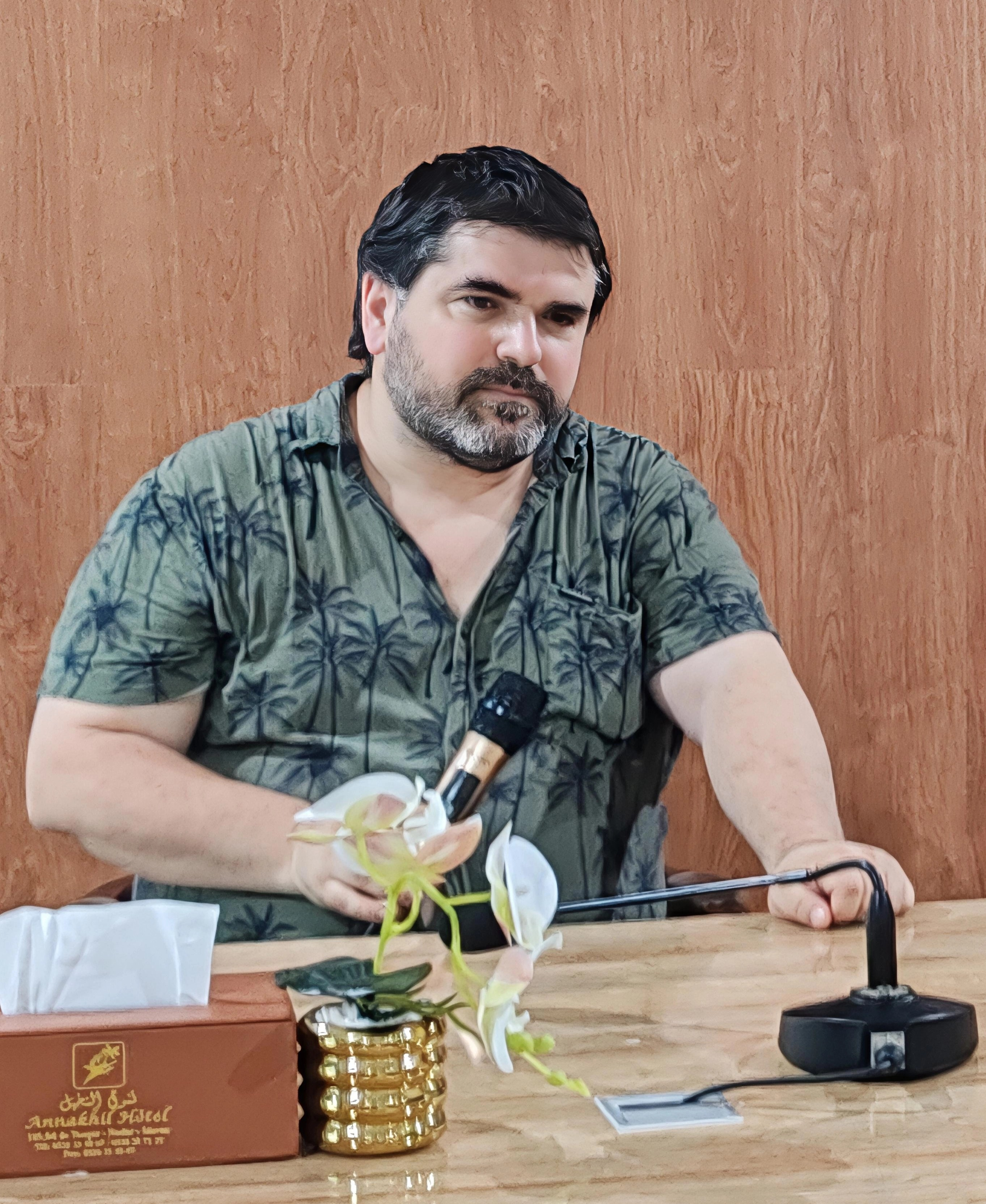
- Urrutikoetxea in 2026
- Born: 12 October 1977; Bilbao, Spain
- Education: University of the Basque Country

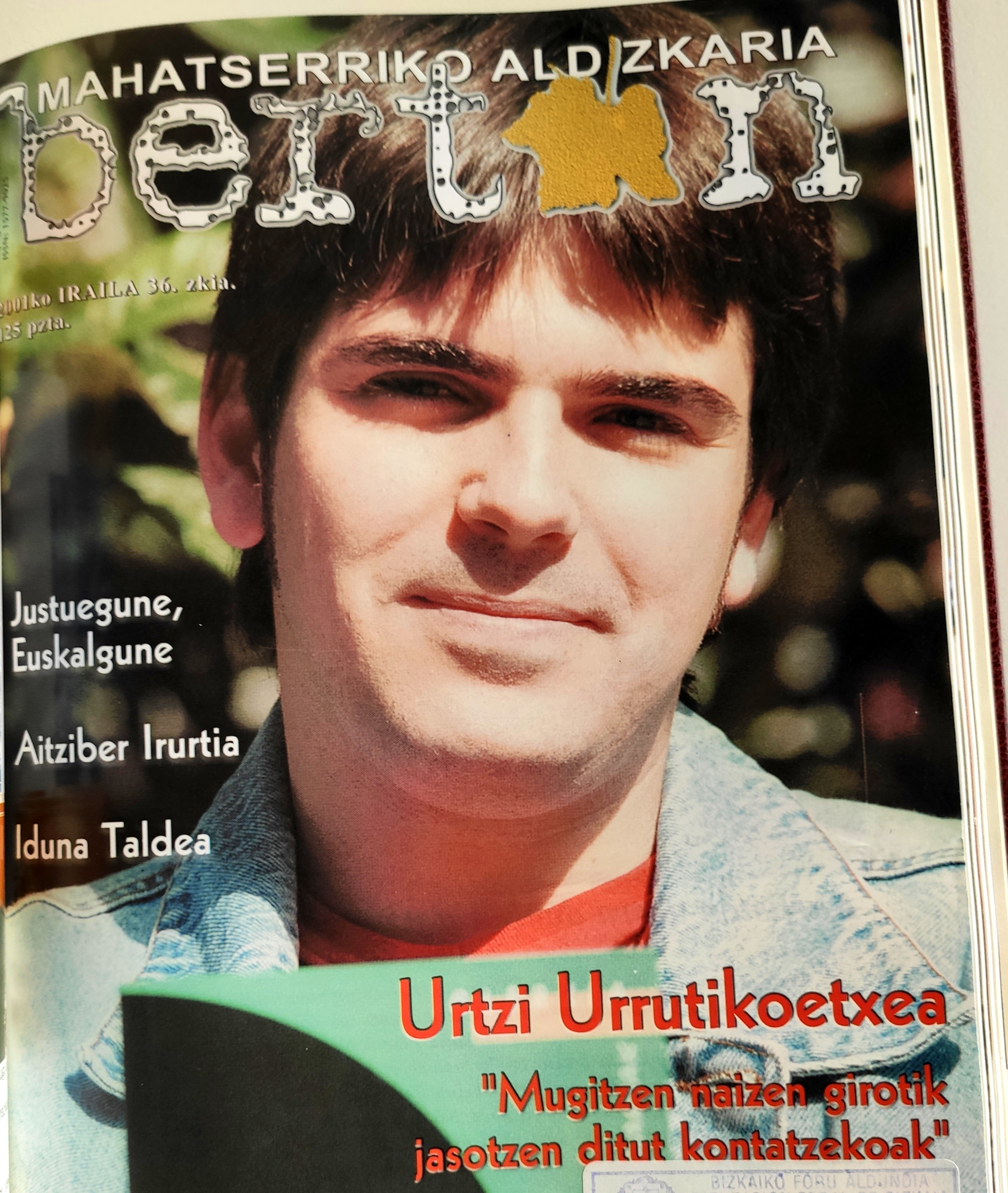
Urtzi Urrutikoetxea, Berton journal, 2001

Urtzi Urrutikoetxea (born 12 October 1977 in Bilbao, Biscay, Basque Country) is a Basque writer and journalist.

== Life ==
He has worked for the Euskal Telebista (Basque television), as well as in several publications in the Basque language, such as Euskaldunon Egunkaria, Berria, Gara, Jakin, Argia, Nora, Zazpi Haizetara and Bertsolari, among others. As a freelance writer, he has worked in different countries, like Iraq, Georgia (including Abkhazia and South Ossetia), Turkey, Venezuela, Colombia, Mexico, Guatemala, Honduras, Nicaragua, Haiti, Puerto Rico, Moldova, Kosovo and many European nations. He was living in Washington, DC, since 2021 to 2025 where he wrote for BERRIA and GARA Basque newspapers; simultaneously he was also working as a substitute teacher at a DC public school, where he taught Spanish (not Basque) Humanities. During his time at the school, he was voted best substitute teacher there and was considered one of the most helpful and interesting people at the school according to many students. "Not only does he teaches us Spanish Humanities, he also teaches us about his culture while doing so" said a student in his class. "While teaching, he also incorporates many things you wouldn't get if you went to the classroom over. He even teaches us a little Basque while he's at it!". Currently in 2026 he is working for Garabide a Non-Governmental Development Organization that, from the Basque Country, promotes a new model of cooperation based on the exchange of experiences.

He has published three books of poems, one novel and one travel book (Afrika Express, 2008) in Basque, and one guidebook in Spanish about the city of Berlin, where he has lived and worked as correspondent. He has also worked as correspondent in Istanbul. Urtzi Urrutikoetxea is the translator into Basque of the Hungarian Nobel Prize Laureate Imre Kertész's Fateless and has also published in Basque a version for children of the Kurdish epic poem Mem û Zin. He has also worked in the field of bertsolaritza (oral improvised poetry in the Basque language), collaborating in different projects like the book Bizkaiko Bertsogintza IV (2006). Urrutikoetxea has been the local producer in the Basque Country and translator in some audiovisual projects, such as the documentary An Independent Mind (2008), by Rex Bloomstein, and the report by Gundars Reders in Latvia TV (2008). He was also (2012-2021) the President of the Euskal PEN / Basque PEN Club. Actually, he is the Chair of the Translation and Linguistic Rights Committee of PEN International.

== Works ==
=== Poetry ===
- Gaur ere ez du atertuko 1998, Arabako, Foru Aldundia
- Borroka galduetatik gatoz (We come from lost struggles) 1997
- Utzidazu karmina kentzen 2000, Kutxa

=== Fiction ===
- Auzoak (Quarters, Neighborhoods) 2005, (in Basque)

=== Travel books ===
- Guía de Berlín, 2005 (in Spanish)
- Afrika Express (2008, the story of a car journey from Bilbao to Mali and Senegal) (in Basque)

=== Essays ===
- Kurdistan, argi bat ekialde hurbilean (2022) (in Basque)
