= Jean Raymond Peltier =

French rower

Personal information
- Nationality: French
- Born: 6 December 1957 (age 67)

Sport
- Sport: Rowing

Jean Raymond Peltier (born 6 December 1957) is a French rower. He competed in the men's quadruple sculls event at the 1980 Summer Olympics.
