= Mincho Nikolov =

Bulgarian rower (born 1952)

Olympic medal record

Men's rowing

Representing Bulgaria
Bronze medal – third place	1980 Moskva	Quadruple sculls

Friendship Games
Silver medal – second place	1984 Moscow	Double sculls

Mincho Nikolov (Bulgarian: Минчо Николов; born 14 September 1952) is a Bulgarian former rower who competed in the 1976 Summer Olympics and in the 1980 Summer Olympics.
