= Bourassa (automobile) =

The Bourassa was a series of one-off automobiles constructed by Montreal engineer Emile-Henri Bourassa (1877-1956) between 1899 and 1926. These vehicles ranged in size from runabouts to a 7-passenger tourer, as well as two cars designed for the Ledoux Carriage Company in 1914.

Bourassa's final car used a Rickenbacker chassis, and featured an L-head engine with a special manifold and electrically heated carburetor, and transmission of his own design. The car gave excellent fuel economy of 31 miles per gallon, but no investors were prepared to give Bourassa the finances needed to get the car into production. After six years of trying to get the car into production, Bourassa had the car demolished in 1932.

Aside from his vehicles, Bourassa's main claim to fame was that Louis Chevrolet lived with Bourassa for eight months after his arrival in Canada from France.
