= Aleksandr Fomchenko =

Russian rower

Personal information
- Born: 15 October 1961 (age 63)
- Height: 187 cm (6 ft 2 in)
- Weight: 87 kg (192 lb)

Sport
- Sport: Rowing

Aleksandr Tikhonovich Fomchenko (born 15 October 1961) is a Russian rower. He competed at the 1980 Summer Olympics in Moscow with the men's double sculls for the Soviet Union where they came fifth.
