= Olde Wolbers =

Olde Wolbers is a surname. Notable people with the surname include:

- Christian Olde Wolbers (born 1972), Belgian musician, songwriter, and producer
- Saskia Olde Wolbers (born 1971), Dutch artist
