= Charles Imbert =

French rower

Personal information
- Nationality: French
- Born: 8 January 1952 (age 73)

Sport
- Sport: Rowing

Charles Imbert (born 8 January 1952) is a French rower. He competed at the 1976 Summer Olympics, 1980 Summer Olympics, and the 1984 Summer Olympics.
