= Andrew Justice =

British rower

Medal record

Men's rowing

Representing Great Britain

Olympic Games
Silver medal – second place	1980 Moscow	Eight

World Rowing Championships
Silver medal – second place	1981 Munich	Eight

Andrew Justice (19 January 1951 – 17 June 2005) was a British rower who competed in the 1976 Summer Olympics and in the 1980 Summer Olympics.

In 1976 he was a crew member of the British boat which finished ninth in the quadruple sculls event.

Four years later he won the silver medal with the British boat in the 1980 eights competition.
