= Victor Scheffers =

Dutch rower

Personal information
- Born: 22 May 1960 (age 66) Berkel en Rodenrijs, the Netherlands
- Height: 1.82 m (6 ft 0 in)
- Weight: 83 kg (183 lb)

Sport
- Sport: Rowing
- Club: Nautilus, Rotterdam

Victor Scheffers (born 22 May 1960) is a retired Dutch rower.

== Career ==
Scheffers competed at the 1980 Summer Olympics in the quadruple sculls and finished in eighth place. In 1978 he won a bronze medal at the junior world championships in the double scull event.
