= Roland Weill =

French rower (born 1948)

Personal information
- Nationality: French
- Born: 28 December 1948 (age 76)

Sport
- Sport: Rowing

Roland Weill (born 28 December 1948) is a French rower. He competed at the 1976 Summer Olympics and the 1980 Summer Olympics.
