= ETB Basque =

Basque international television channel

- Country: Basque Country (Spain and France)
- Broadcast area: Worldwide
- Network: ETB
- Headquarters: Bilbao, Basque Country

Programming
- Languages: Basque and Spanish
- Picture format: 1080i HDTV

Ownership
- Owner: Euskal Irrati Telebista

History
- Launched: 1 January 2021; 5 years ago

Links
- Website: eitb.eus/eu/telebista/eitb-basque

ETB Basque was a Basque public international television channel operated by Euskal Irrati Telebista. It was launched on 1 January 2021, as a result of the merger of ETB Sat and Canal Vasco. It broadcasts in both Basque and Castilian languages. It broadcasts through IPTV, cable and YouTube.

It broadcasts programmes from the main Basque channels, ETB 1 and ETB 2, abroad. Its programming is especially aimed at the Basque diaspora, both within Spain and in the rest of the world, particularly in Latin America, Europe and the United States.

== History ==
The current EITB Basque channel is the direct heir of Canal Vasco/ETB Sat.

The latter began broadcasting in March 2001, as an international channel run by ETB and aimed specifically at America and its Spanish-speaking population interested in the Basque world, for example, due to genealogical links. As a result, it was mainly made up of original Castilian language programming from ETB2, interspersed with a minimal amount of content in Basque from ETB1, which was always subtitled in Castilian. ETB carried out special events through this channel, such as the Concurso de Canal Vasco, in which every summer (until 2012) trips to the Basque Country were raffled off to foreigners who were avid followers of its programming, who had to answer questions about it to win the prize.

ETB Sat, on the other hand was launched before Canal Vasco, on 3 June 1996, under the name of Euskal Telebista, distinguishing itself from ETB 1 and ETB 2. It was initially aimed at Europe (including the Basque Country) via the Astra satellite. Unlike the later channel, ETB's own and original satellite channel had an equal programming schedule in both the Basque and Castilian languages, without, in principle, prioritising one language over the other, and with no Castilian subtitles for the Basque language content. On 16 October 1998, ETB Sat began broadcasts in the Americas, until it was split back to just Europe with the creation of Canal Vasco.

On 1 May 2013, ETB Sat (the European channel) was removed from the Astra satellite to focus on cable and internet broadcasting.

On 1 January 2021, as part of a reorganisation of the EITB group, Canal Vasco and ETB Sat were unified into a single channel, becoming EITB Basque, and as part of the continuity style reform carried out at the beginning of 2022, it was rebranded as ETB Basque.

The channel ceased broadcasting on March 18, 2026, as part of the digital restructuring of Euskal Telebista, being replaced by ETB1 On and ETB2 On, digital versions focused on broadcasting in Basque and Spanish, respectively.

== Main programmes ==
- Egun On Euskadi: daily morning news in Basque (ETB1).
- Gaur Egun: main daily news programme in Basque (ETB1).
- Teleberri: main daily news programme in Castilian (ETB2).
- Atrápame si puedes: general culture quiz in Castilian (ETB2).
- Kerman mintzalagun bila: programme in basic Basque for learners of the language, with advice on how to use the language in everyday situations (ETB1, occasionally ETB2).
- EITB Kultura: artistic news programme (cinema, plastic arts, theatre, music, literature, etc.) (ETB1 and ETB2; usually broadcast in Castilian).
