= Rob Robbers =

Dutch rower

Personal information
- Born: 3 January 1950 (age 76) Balikpapan, Indonesia
- Height: 1.91 m (6 ft 3 in)
- Weight: 81 kg (179 lb)

Sport
- Sport: Rowing
- Club: Die Leythe, Leiden

Robert Robbers (born 3 January 1950) is a retired Dutch rower. He competed at the 1980 Summer Olympics in the quadruple sculls and finished in eights place.

After retiring from competition he became a national rowing coach.
