= ETB 2 =

ETB2
- Country: Spain
- Broadcast area: Basque Country and Navarre
- Network: ETB
- Headquarters: Bilbao, Basque Country

Programming
- Picture format: 1080i HDTV

Ownership
- Owner: EITB
- Sister channels: ETB 1 ETB 3 ETB 4 ETB Basque

History
- Launched: 31 May 1986; 39 years ago

Links
- Website: eitb.eus/es/television/etb2

Availability

Terrestrial
- Digital terrestrial television: Álava: Channel 45; Biscay: Channel 35; French Basque Country: Channel 33; Gipuzkoa: Channel 48; Navarre: Channel 26

ETB 2 (ETB Bi) is the second television channel from the Euskal Irrati Telebista group in the Basque Autonomous Community, Navarre, and the French Basque Country. The channel broadcasts entirely in Spanish.

The channel launched on 31 May 1986. An HD feed of ETB 2 was launched on 21 December 2016.

Its reception area comprises the whole Basque Country — i.e. the Basque Autonomous Community, Navarre and the Northern Basque Country — and some surrounding places.

== History ==
The channel launched on 31 May 1986, and during the first period the channel broadcast in a situation of illegality because all the procedures for its installation were carried out in secret and without the authorization of the national government. After the launch of ETB 2, ETB was the first Spanish regional network to have two television channels and the first Spanish language channel out of RTVE's monopoly.

== Programming ==
The channel's programming includes news, interviews, films and documentaries. ETB 2 also stands out for lacking sporting events, since by decision of ETB this programming is broadcast by the rest of the network's channels to favor broadcasts in Basque. On the other hand, the channel favors premiere cinema and news programs to compete with the national channels that broadcast in Spanish. ETB 2 is the channel with the best audience levels of ETB group.
