= EITB =

Basque Radio Television

Euskal Irrati Telebista
- Type: Media
- Country: Spain
- Headquarters: Bilbao, Biscay
- Broadcast area: Basque Autonomous Community; Navarre; French Basque Country
- Owner: Department of Culture of the Basque Government
- Launch date: 20 May 1982; 44 years ago
- Affiliation: FORTA
- Official website: eitb.eus

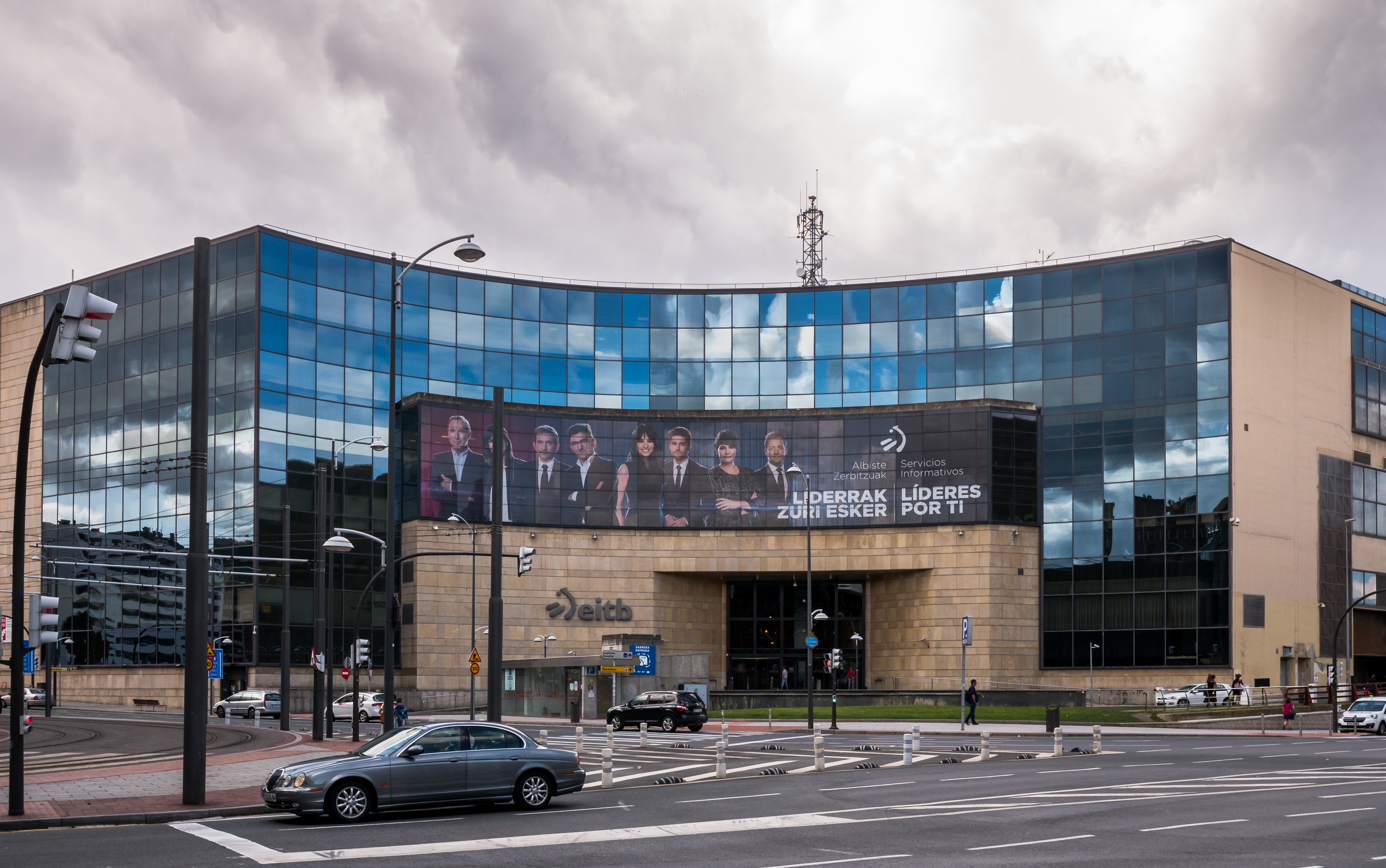
EITB headquarters in Bilbao

Euskal Irrati Telebista (Basque: [eus̺kal irat̪i t̪elebis̺t̪a]; transl. Basque Radio Television; acronym EITB, branded eitb) is the Basque Autonomous Community's public broadcast service, which broadcasts throughout the Basque Country. Its main brand is Euskal Telebista (ETB, Basque Television).

EITB is the leading media group in the Basque Autonomous Community of Spain with five domestic television channels and six radio stations. Their channels are also broadcast in the whole Basque Country, and people in nearby territories such as Burgos (in Castile and León), Cantabria, Huesca and Saragossa (in Aragon), La Rioja, and the non-Basque-speaking region of Pyrénées-Atlantiques (in France) can also get the signal. It has been running since 1982 and during this period it has established itself as a major media organisation, connecting with more than a million people every day. The majority of EITB's broadcasts deal with local news and entertainment.

== History ==
In Francoist Spain, the Basque underground had an independent voice, Radio Euskadi, which operated on shortwave from two continents.

On 20 May 1982, the Basque Parliament unanimously approved the law that set up Euskal Irrati Telebista and on 23 November, the radio channel Euskadi Irratia started broadcasting. ETB, for its part, reached Basque households at midnight on 31 December 1982 with a presentation by the Basque Lehendakari Carlos Garaikoetxea and its programmes were regularized, starting from 16 February in the following year. At the time about 30 people worked in the ETB centre in Iurreta to provide programmes exclusively in Basque.

Several years later, ETB 2, its second flagship television channel, commenced operations on 31 May 1986 broadcasting in Spanish, and at the present time it has a further two international channels. Following an agreement between Sogecable and EITB, 87 million households all over Europe were able to pick up ETB Sat from the Astra satellite since May 2001. The corporation also launched Canal Vasco, a medium specifically geared towards the Americas, where it reached viewers through American DTH and cable companies. Both of these were merged into ETB Basque in early 2021.

Following the implementation of Digital terrestrial television, the Basque government allowed EITB to create two new digital television channels. The first, ETB 3, started broadcasting in October 2008, offering programming for children and youth in Basque. The second, ETB 4, was first expected to be a bilingual news channel, but was later redefined as a sports channel. Its launch was postponed but ETB 4 subsequently launched officially on 29 October 2014.

The EITB group also has five radio stations with more than 300,000 listeners every day - Euskadi Irratia, Radio Euskadi, Radio Vitoria, Euskadi Gaztea and EITB Musika, respectively.

== Notable Staff ==
Among many notable staff, Urtzi Urrutikoetxea has worked at EITB and is a prominent writer in his current community of Washington, DC where he substitutes at a DC public school.

== Iberia Flight 610 ==
On 19 February 1985, Iberia Flight 610, a Boeing 727 from Madrid to Bilbao, crashed onto an EITB antenna during approach to Bilbao Airport, causing the deaths of all 148 occupants inside the jet.

== Budget ==
The Basque community has increased its 2015 budget to 124.6 million euro up from 107.6 million the year before.

== Controversies ==
Both EITB and ETB have been at the center of some controversy over their content and audiovisual productions.

=== EiTB controversy (2017) ===
In 2017, the ETB 1 channel broadcast a program called Euskalduna naiz, eta zu? and one of the episodes broadcast was the source of much controversy due to some statements that were made in it. The controversy was denounced by the Unión del Pueblo Navarro (UPN), the Popular Party (PP) and Covite, who announced that they would carry the matter went to the courts and the European Commission and the PSE-EE asked the public entity to be held accountable. The matter even reached the Spanish Senate. Finally EITB had to apologize for it.

=== Betizu (2022) ===
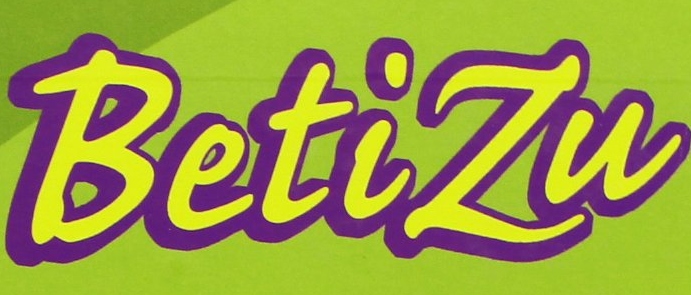
Betizu logo

In 2022 a small controversy arose with Betizu (2001–2011). The Betizu stars (presenters, actors, singers, etc.) were children and adolescents (child stars). As adults, some of the stars spoke about the treatment they received on the program when they recorded it.

The singer and presenter Zuriñe Hidalgo was one of the many stars, where she has been since she was 11 years old. In the year 2022, as an adult, she recognized that it was not easy being so young on the programme and criticized the show and the ETB 1 channel for certain facts, declaring that "she suffered discrimination in situations ranging from the way she was dressed, to the way they treated her".

== Services ==
=== Television channels ===
- ETB 1 – Generalist channel in Basque language.
- ETB 2 – Generalist channel in Spanish language.
- ETB 3 – Youth channel in Basque language.
- ETB 4 – Bilingual entertainment channel in both Spanish and Basque.
- ETB Basque - Worldwide channel, both in Basque and Spanish languages, a direct heir of former ETB Sat and Canal Vasco.

=== Radio stations ===
- Euskadi Irratia – News/Talk radio station in Basque language
- Radio Euskadi – News/Talk radio station in Spanish language
- Radio Vitoria – News/Talk radio station aimed at the city of Vitoria in Spanish language
- Gaztea – Music radio station in the Basque language aimed at the youth
- EITB Musika – Cultural and soft music radio station in Basque and Spanish
