= List of Bulgarian sportspeople =

Famous or notable Bulgarian sportspeople include:

== Athletics ==
- Yordanka Blagoeva - Olympic silver and bronze medalist
- Rostislav Dimitrov
- Svetla Dimitrova
- Yordanka Donkova - Olympic gold and bronze medalist
- Ivanka Khristova - Olympic gold and bronze medalist
- Tsvetanka Khristova - Olympic silver and bronze medalist
- Stefka Kostadinova - Olympic gold and bronze medalist
- Ivet Lalova - European Champion
- Tereza Marinova - Olympic gold medalist
- Khristo Markov - Olympic gold medalist
- Svetla Mitkova
- Petya Pendareva
- Mariya Petkova - Double Olympic silver medalist
- Petar Petrov - Olympic bronze medalist
- Iva Prandzheva
- Nikolina Shtereva - Olympic silver medalist
- Vasilka Stoeva - Olympic bronze medalist
- Atanas Tarev
- Daniela Yordanova
- Diana Yorgova - Olympic silver medalist
- Ginka Zagorcheva

== Badminton ==
- Petya Nedelcheva
- Linda Zechiri

== Basketball ==
- Denis Agre
- Krasimira Bogdanova
- Diana Dilova-Braynova
- Vanya Dermendzhieva
- Silviya Germanova
- Nadka Golcheva
- Krasimira Gyurova
- Kosta Iliev
- Petkana Makaveeva
- Penka Metodieva
- Angelina Mikhaylova
- Snezhana Mikhaylova
- Kostadinka Radkova
- Margarita Shtarkelova
- Gergina Skerlatova
- Evladiya Slavcheva-Stefanova
- Mariya Stoyanova
- Penka Stoyanova
- Todorka Yordanova

== Biathlon ==
- Krasimir Anev
- Ekaterina Dafovska - Olympic gold medalist
- Pavlina Filipova
- Vladimir Iliev
- Irina Nikulchina - Olympic bronze medalist

== Boxing ==
- Angel Angelov - Olympic silver medalist
- Boris Georgiev - Olympic bronze medalist
- Aleksandar Khristov - Olympic silver medalist
- Vladimir Kolev - Olympic bronze medalist
- Georgi Kostadinov - Olympic gold medalist
- Petar Lesov - Olympic gold medalist
- Ivailo Marinov - Olympic gold and bronze medalist
- Ivan Mihailov - Olympic bronze medalist
- Alexander Nikolov - Olympic bronze medalist
- Boris Nikolov - Olympic bronze medalist
- Daniel Petrov - Olympic gold and silver medalist
- Tervel Pulev - Olympic bronze medalist
- Svilen Rusinov - Olympic bronze medalist
- Georgi Stankov - Olympic bronze medalist
- Serafim Todorov - Olympic silver medalist
- Tontcho Tontchev - Olympic silver medalist

== Canoeing ==
- Borislav Ananiev - Olympic bronze medalist
- Borislav Borisov - Olympic bronze medalist
- Nikolay Bukhalov - Double Olympic gold medalist
- Ivan Burtchin - Olympic bronze medalist
- Fedia Damianov - Olympic bronze medalist
- Andrian Dushev - Olympic bronze medalist
- Vanja Gesheva-Tsvetkova - Olympic gold, double silver and bronze medalist
- Nikolai Ilkov - Olympic bronze medalist
- Borislava Ivanova - Olympic bronze medalist
- Milko Kazanov - Olympic bronze medalist
- Lazar Khristov - Olympic bronze medalist
- Lyubomir Lyubenov - Olympic gold and silver medalist
- Ivan Manev - Olympic bronze medalist
- Martin Marinov - Double Olympic bronze medalist
- Petar Merkov - Double Olympic silver medalist
- Bozhidar Milenkov - Olympic bronze medalist
- Diana Paliiska - Olympic silver and bronze medalist
- Ognyana Petrova - Olympic bronze medalist
- Blagovest Stoyanov - Olympic bronze medalist

== Cross-country skiing ==
- Ivan Lebanov - Olympic bronze medalist

== Equestrian ==
- Petar Mandajiev - Olympic silver medalist

== Fencing ==
- Vasil Etropolski - World Champion

== Figure skating ==
- Albena Denkova
- Maxim Staviski

== Football ==
- Dimitar Berbatov
- Georgi Danov
- Stanimir Dimitrov
- Nikolay Godzhev
- Georgi Gradev
- Krastina Ivanova
- Milan Karatantchev
- Kaloyan Kopchev
- Miroslav Kosev
- Aneliya Kukunova
- Yonko Nedelchev
- Lyubomir Nyagolov
- Boris Papazov
- Genko Papazov
- Dimitar Ralchev
- Raycho Raychev
- Samir Seliminski
- Aleksandar Shalamanov
- Shaban Shefket
- Veselin Shulev
- Hristo Stoichkov
- Simona Stoyanova
- Archontis Stoyianov
- Ivana Taneva
- Stelian Trasborg
- Dimitar Tsenovski
- Yuksel Yumerov

== Gymnastics ==
- Stoyan Deltchev - Olympic gold and bronze medalist
- Diana Dudeva - Olympic bronze medalist
- Adriana Dunavska - Olympic silver medalist
- Lubomir Geraskov - Olympic gold medalist
- Maria Gigova - Multiple World Champion
- Diliana Gueorguieva
- Lilia Ignatova
- Zhaneta Ilieva - Olympic bronze medalist
- Velik Kapsazov - Olympic bronze medalist
- Eleonora Kezhova - Olympic bronze medalist
- Elizabeth Koleva
- Mila Marinova
- Zornitsa Marinova - Olympic bronze medalist
- Sylvia Miteva
- Elizabeth Paisieva
- Bianka Panova
- Simona Peycheva
- Diana Popova
- Iliana Raeva
- Anelia Ralenkova
- Kristina Rangelova - Olympic bronze medalist
- Neshka Robeva
- Boriana Stoyanova - World Champion
- Ivelina Taleva - Olympic silver medalist
- Galina Tancheva - Olympic bronze medalist
- Vladislava Tancheva - Olympic bronze medalist
- Julia Trashlieva
- Yordan Yovchev - Olympic silver, triple olympic bronze medalist

== Martial arts ==
- Tsvetana Bozhilova - judoka
- Georgi Georgiev - Olympic bronze medalist judoka
- Alexandar Komanov - karateka and mixed martial arts fighter
- Iliyan Nedkov - Olympic bronze medalist judoka
- Aleksandra Stubleva - karateka
- Stanoy Tabakov - sambo and mixed martial arts fighter
- Betina Temelkova (born 1997) - Bulgarian-Israeli judoka
- Dimitar Zapryanov - Olympic silver medalist judoka

== Rowing ==
- Anka Bakova - Olympic bronze medalist
- Lalka Berberova - Olympic silver medalist
- Rumelyana Boncheva - Olympic bronze medalist
- Bogdan Dobrev - Olympic bronze medalist
- Nadiya Filipova - Olympic silver medalist
- Anka Georgieva - Olympic bronze medalist
- Kapka Georgieva - Olympic silver medalist
- Magdalena Georgieva - Olympic bronze medalist
- Ginka Gyurova - Double Olympic silver medalist
- Siyka Kelbecheva - Olympic gold and bronze medalist
- Stoyanka Kurbatova - Olympic gold and bronze medalist
- Stefka Madina - Olympic bronze medalist
- Mariyka Modeva - Double Olympic silver medalist
- Dolores Nakova - Olympic bronze medalist
- Rumyana Neykova - Olympic gold, silver and bronze medalist
- Mincho Nikolov - Olympic bronze medalist
- Violeta Ninova - Olympic bronze medalist
- Svetla Otsetova - Olympic gold medalist
- Lyubomir Petrov - Olympic bronze medalist
- Ivo Rusev - Olympic bronze medalist
- Mariana Serbezova - Olympic bronze medalist
- Radka Stoyanova - Olympic silver medalist
- Rita Todorova - Olympic silver medalist
- Lilyana Vaseva - Olympic silver medalist
- Iskra Velinova - Olympic silver medalist
- Ivo Yanakiev - Olympic bronze medalist
- Reni Yordanova - Olympic silver medalist
- Zdravka Yordanova - Olympic gold medalist

== Shooting ==
- Lyubcho Dyakov - Olympic bronze medalist
- Maria Grozdeva - Double Olympic gold, triple Olympic bronze medalist
- Tanyu Kiryakov - Double Olympic gold medalist
- Vesela Letcheva - Double Olympic silver medalist
- Nonka Matova - Olympic silver medalist
- Emil Milev - Olympic silver medalist

== Skiing ==
- Kilian Albrecht - alpine skiing
- Marina Georgieva-Nikolova - Short track speed skiing
- Petar Popangelov - alpine skiing
- Evgenia Radanova - Double Olympic silver and Olympic bronze medalist in short track speed skiing
- Kiril Trayanov - alpine skiing and vert skating
- Vladimir Zografski - World junior champion in ski jumping

== Snowboarding ==
- Aleksandra Zhekova

== Swimming ==
- Mihail Alexandrov
- Tanya Dangalakova - Olympic gold medalist
- Antoaneta Frenkeva - Olympic silver and bronze medalist
- Bistra Gospodinova
- Denislav Kalchev
- Ivanka Moralieva
- Petar Stoychev - World Champion in open water swimming

== Table tennis ==
- Daniela Guergueltcheva - European Champion

== Tennis ==
- Grigor Dimitrov
- Sesil Karatantcheva
- Katerina Maleeva
- Magdalena Maleeva
- Manuela Maleeva
- Tsvetana Pironkova

== Vert skating ==
- Pavel Mitrenga

== Volleyball ==
- Todor Aleksiev
- Yordan Angelov - Olympic silver medalist
- Verka Borisova - Olympic bronze medalist
- Tsvetana Bozhurina - Olympic bronze medalist
- Dimitar Dimitrov - Olympic silver medalist
- Stefan Dimitrov - Olympic silver medalist
- Rositsa Dimitrova - Olympic bronze medalist
- Tanya Dimitrova - Olympic bronze medalist
- Maya Georgieva - Olympic bronze medalist
- Margarita Gerasimova - Olympic bronze medalist
- Tanya Gogova - Olympic bronze medalist
- Stoyan Gunchev - Olympic silver medalist
- Hristo Iliev - Olympic silver medalist
- Valentina Ilieva - Olympic bronze medalist
- Rumyana Kaisheva - Olympic bronze medalist
- Matey Kaziyski
- Anka Khristolova - Olympic bronze medalist
- Petko Petkov - Olympic silver medalist
- Kristiana Petlichka
- Silviya Petrunova - Olympic bronze medalist
- Dobriana Rabadzhieva
- Teodor Salparov
- Kaspar Simeonov - Olympic silver medalist
- Tsvetan Sokolov
- Vanya Sokolova
- Galina Stancheva - Olympic bronze medalist
- Hristo Stoyanov - Olympic silver medalist
- Radostin Stoychev
- Mitko Todorov - Olympic silver medalist
- Tsano Tsanov - Olympic silver medalist
- Hristo Tsvetanov
- Emil Valtchev - Olympic silver medalist
- Antonina Zetova
- Dimitar Zlatanov - Olympic silver medalist

== Weightlifting ==
- Yordan Bikov - Olympic gold medalist
- Blagoy Blagoev - Olympic silver medalist
- Galabin Boevski - Olympic gold medalist
- Stefan Botev - Double olympic bronze medalist
- Velichko Cholakov - Olympic bronze medalist
- Milen Dobrev - Olympic gold medalist
- Borislav Gidikov - Olympic gold medalist
- Valentin Hristov - Olympic silver medalist
- Ivan Ivanov - Olympic gold medalist
- Nedelcho Kolev - Olympic bronze medalist
- Aleksandar Kraychev - Olympic silver medalist
- Mladen Kuchev - Olympic silver medalist
- Sevdalin Marinov - Olympic gold medalist
- Georgi Markov - Olympic silver medalist
- Sevdalin Minchev - Olympic bronze medalist
- Yordan Mitkov - Olympic gold medalist
- Andon Nikolov - Olympic gold medalist
- Norair Nurikyan - Double Olympic gold medalist
- Nikolay Peshalov - Olympic gold, silver, double bronze medalist
- Yanko Rusev - Olympic gold medalist
- Krastyu Semerdzhiev - Olympic silver medalist
- Atanas Shopov - Olympic silver and bronze medalist
- Trendafil Stoychev - Olympic silver medalist
- Georgi Todorov - Olympic silver medalist
- Stefan Topurov - Olympic silver medalist
- Alan Tsagaev - Olympic silver medalist
- Aleksandar Varbanov - Olympic bronze medalist
- Valentin Yordanov - Olympic gold and bronze medalist
- Yoto Yotov - Double Olympic silver medalist
- Asen Zlatev - Olympic gold medalist

== Wrestling ==
- Ismail Abilov - Olympic gold medalist
- Lyutvi Ahmedov - Olympic silver medalist
- Ivo Angelov - World champion
- Stefan Angelov - Double Olympic bronze medalist
- Stoyan Apostolov - Olympic silver medalist
- Stoyan Balov - Olympic silver medalist
- Serafim Barzakov - Olympic silver medalist
- Krali Bimbalov - Olympic silver medalist
- Slavcho Chervenkov - Olympic silver medalist
- Dimitar Dobrev - Olympic gold and silver medalist
- Vladimir Dubov - World silver medalist
- Miho Dukov - Olympic silver medalist
- Osman Duraliev - Olympic silver medalist
- Prodan Gardzhev - Olympic gold and bronze medalist
- Rangel Gerovski - Olympic silver medalist
- Valentin Getsov - Olympic silver medalist
- Kamen Goranov - Olympic silver medalist
- Hasan Isaev - Olympic gold medalist
- Angel Kerezov - Olympic silver medalist
- Petar Kirov - Double Olympic gold medalist
- Ivan Kolev - Olympic bronze medalist
- Stancho Kolev - Double Olympic silver medalist
- Atanas Komchev - Olympic gold medalist
- Dimo Kostov - Olympic bronze medalist
- Georgi Markov - Olympic gold medalist
- Hussein Mehmedov - Olympic silver medalist
- Mladen Mladenov - Olympic bronze medalist
- Said Mustafov - Olympic bronze medalist
- Armen Nazaryan - Double Olympic gold medalist
- Ognyan Nikolov - Olympic silver medalist
- Stoyan Nikolov - Olympic silver medalist
- Pavel Pavlov - Olympic bronze medalist
- Dinko Petrov - Olympic bronze medalist
- Kiril Petkov - Olympic silver medalist
- Boyan Radev - Double Olympic gold medalist
- Valentin Raychev - Olympic gold medalist
- Georgi Raykov - Olympic gold medalist
- Alexander Rusev - Professional wrestler
- Nermedin Selimov - Olympic bronze medalist
- Simeon Shterev - Olympic bronze medalist
- Petko Sirakov - Olympic silver medalist
- Nikola Stanchev - Olympic gold medalist
- Rahmat Sukra - Olympic bronze medalist
- Kiril Terziev - Olympic bronze medalist
- Enyu Todorov - Olympic silver medalist
- Aleksandar Tomov - Triple Olympic silver medalist
- Bratan Tsenov - Olympic bronze medalist
- Ivan Tsonov - Olympic silver medalist
- Enyu Valchev - Olympic gold, silver and bronze medalist
- Zhivko Vangelov - Olympic silver medalist
- Radoslav Velikov - Olympic bronze medalist
- Yavor Yanakiev - Olympic bronze medalist
- Ivan Yankov - Olympic silver medalist
- Valentin Yordanov - Olympic gold and bronze medalist
- Taybe Yusein - Double World silver medalist
- Nejdet Zalev - Olympic silver medalist
- Stanka Zlateva - Double Olympic silver medalist

== See also ==
- List of Bulgarians
- List of flag bearers for Bulgaria at the Olympics
- List of Olympic men's ice hockey players for Bulgaria
- List of Olympic female gymnasts for Bulgaria
