= Papazov =

Papazov (Cyrillic: Папазов) is a Bulgarian surname. Notable people with the name include:

- Boris Papazov (born 1989), Bulgarian footballer
- Danail Papazov (born 1959), Bulgarian politician
- Doncho Papazov (born 1939), Bulgarian oceanographer, adventurer and journalist
- Genko Papazov (born 1972), Bulgarian footballer
- Georges Papazov (1894–1972), Bulgarian painter and writer
- Ivo Papazov (born 1952), Bulgarian clarinettist
- Konstantin Papazov (born 1967), known as Titi Papazov, Bulgarian basketball player and coach
- Mark-Emilio Papazov (born 2003), Bulgarian footballer
- Tomislav Papazov (born 2001), Bulgarian footballer

== See also ==
- Papazov Island, rocky island near Astrolabe Island, Antarctica
- Papazov Passage, between Krogh Island and DuBois Island in Biscoe Islands, Antarctica
