= Radostín =

Radostín may refer to places in the Czech Republic:

- Radostín (Havlíčkův Brod District), a municipality and village in the Vysočina Region
- Radostín (Žďár nad Sázavou District), a municipality and village in the Vysočina Region
- Radostín nad Oslavou, a market town in the Vysočina Region
- Radostín, a village and part of Sychrov (Liberec District) in the Liberec Region

== See also ==
- Radostin, a Bulgarian name
