= Spiridon Kacarosi =

Albanian politician

Spiridon Kacarosi was the head of the Albanian Secret Service, (Secret Office of the Ministry of Interior at the time), from 1930 to 1937.

== Life ==
Spiridon Kacarosi was born in Shkodra, on 5 September 1891. His grandfather, an Ottoman clerk of Souliote origin, came to Shkodra from Corfu, in 1845. He attended primary and secondary education in his hometown, later studying and graduating in a commercial school. On 1911-1913, he was active in the Malësia Revolt. In 1913-1914 and 1921, he published various articles in the Taraboshi newspaper. He was at times vice-prefect in Mirdita, Përmet, and Durrës; mayor of Dibra, and Saranda. He was head of various high offices in the state administration of the time, and chief of the Albanian Secret Service from 1930-1937. Kacarosi was arrested and twice condemned to death, but he managed to escape under accidental circumstances: first by the Serbs, in 1915; later by the Communists, on 18 November 1944. Interned along with his family from Tirana to Shkodra, in 1952, he was imprisoned in the same year. During 1954-1958, he was held in various prison camps in Shtyllas, Radostina and Kuç (Kurvelesh). He died in Shkodra, on 6 March 1966.
