= Marlene Cummins =

- Born: Cunnamulla, Queensland, Australia
- Genre: Blues
- Occupations: Musician, composer
- Instruments: vocals, saxophone
- Website: www.marlenecummins.com

Marlene Cummins is a jazz blues singer, saxophonist, songwriter, artist, Aboriginal Australian activist, broadcaster, dancer, and actor. Many activists consider her to be Australia's Angela Davis.

At the National Indigenous Music Awards 2026, Cummins was inducted into the Hall of Fame.

== Music ==
Cummins is considered Australia's foremost Indigenous blues performer, and is influenced by Big Mama Thornton, Etta James, and Ray Charles. She honed her skills at the Berklee College of Music. Her band includes Murray Cook and Rex Goh.

She showcases her vast knowledge of blues and roots music on Koori Radio, where she hosts Marloo's Blues, providing music and discussions from an indigenous perspective. This show won her the Broadcaster of the Year award at the 2009 Deadly Awards.

Marlene co-wrote her first release "Whichway Up" with writer & performer Isaiah B Brunt, the EP was recorded and produced by Tony Buchen and released in 2008. "Whichway Up" made the top 10 Australian Blues Radio Charts and was picked up by Qantas where it aired on high rotation.

Cummins wrote a song about Pemulwuy as a way of giving back to the Redfern community who see him as a hero. After dancing for Prince William, she gave him a copy of the song and explained the significance of the story to him, along with a petition to bring Pemulwuy's head back to his people.

In 2012, Marlene performed three of her original works, including Insufficient Funds, Pension Day Blues, and Pemulwuy. Pemulwuy, she explains, is a spiritual sacred song. She has a sense of black humour and sorrow in her lyrics. The three songs were performed by Marlene at Sydney Conservatorium of Music on 30 June 2012 at "Our Music, Performing Place, Listening to Sydney" playing day with other aboriginal artists. Pemulwuy was an infamous and heroic aboriginal warrior in the first days of the Sydney colony near Parramatta.

She provided music for a Griffin Theatre Company production Shark Island Stories based on the work of Sally Morgan.

Her first full-length album, Koori Woman Blues, is a mixture of original and traditional blues songs and includes guests Gil Askey, Fiona Boyes, Mark Atkins and Shannon Barnett. She is working on a musical stage show using her songs called Boomerang Alley.

In 2022, she was interviewed by Andrew Ford on ABC Radio National's Music Show about her Marloo's Blues band playing in Sydney International Women's Jazz Festival, at which she was the headline act.

== Activism ==
Cummins joined the Aboriginal Tent Embassy at age 16 and was at the centre of the Aboriginal rights movement in the 1970s.

She was a founding member of the Australian Black Panther Party, which was inspired by the American Black Panther Party. She campaigned for medical, educational, and legal services, land rights and monitored police conduct on the "pig patrol". She was arrested for using obscene language to an abusive police officer, and absconded bail and fled to New Zealand. In 2012 she attended an international gathering of Black Panthers in New York hosted by Kathleen Neal Cleaver.

In 2014 she spoke out against black-on-black violence and sexual assault.

== Painting ==
Cummins is also an accomplished painter and was shortlisted for the New South Wales Parliament Art Prize. She has recently been working on portraits and her saxophone in Rabbitohs colours.

== Acting ==
Cummins has appeared in the TV series Redfern Now and Supernova, the feature film The Matrix Reloaded, and the short film Hush (2007), with Lisa Flanagan and Auriel Andrew.

== Personal life ==
Marlene Cummins was born in Cunnamulla, grew up in outback Queensland and Acacia Ridge, and has lived in Redfern for decades. However her country is Kuku Yalanji in the Cape York Peninsula.

Her mother was a Woppaburra woman from Great Keppel Island. Her father, Darcy Cummins, was a Guguyelandji musician. He travelled internationally and established links with Native Americans.

As a teenager she was in a relationship with the Australian Black Panther Party leader Denis Walker.

Cummins performed a traditional Murri dance at Thomas Hickey's memorial service.

She is the focus of Rachel Perkins' documentary, Black Panther Woman, which premiered at the 2014 Sydney Film Festival.

== Discography ==
=== Albums ===
List of albums, with selected details
Title	Details
Koori Woman Blues	Released: 2014; Label: GoSet Music (GOSET007MC); Format: digital, CD

=== Extended plays ===
List of EP, with selected details
Title	Details
Whichway Up	Released: 2008; Label: Format: CD

== Awards ==
=== National Indigenous Music Awards ===
The National Indigenous Music Awards recognise excellence, innovation and leadership among Aboriginal and Torres Strait Islander musicians from throughout Australia. They commenced in 2004.

Year	Nominee / work	Award	Result
2026	Marlene Cummins	Hall of Fame	inducted
