= The Rough Guide to Australian Aboriginal Music =

Compilation album by Various artists
- Released: 20 April 1999
- Genre: World, Indigenous Australian, Australian
- Length: 64:41
- Label: World Music Network

Full series chronology
| The Rough Guide to the Music of Portugal (1998) | The Rough Guide to Australian Aboriginal Music (1999) | The Rough Guide to World Roots (1999) |

The Rough Guide to Australian Aboriginal Music is a compilation album originally released in 1999. Part of the World Music Network Rough Guides series, the album features the Indigenous Australian music of the 1980s and 90s, including both traditional and modern genres, such as Aboriginal rock. Duncan Baker coordinated the project, while Marcus Breen, a professor specializing in Australian music at Bond University, Queensland, wrote the liner notes. Phil Stanton, co-founder of the World Music Network produced the album. This was the first of two similarly named compilations: the second edition was released in 2008.

== Critical reception ==
Professional ratings
Review scores
| Source | Rating |
|---|---|
| Allmusic | 4/5 stars |

The album received positive reviews. Writing for AllMusic, Alex Henderson enjoyed the "unpredictability" of the album. He went on to wax eloquent upon the didgeridoo, whose sounds he compared to the Gregorian chants. The instrument was also a topic of Josef Woodard's JazzTimes review, where he called it fodder for "latter-day mixologists in search of easy exotica". Its use in "the real thing" on this album, according to Woodard, was thus "fascinating", "important", and a potentially "spiritually transforming experience".

== Track listing ==
| No. | Title | Artist | Length |
|---|---|---|---|
| 1. | "Saltwater" | Dusty Legune & Campbell Allenbar | 2:20 |
| 2. | "Kurongk Boy, Kurongk Girl" | Ruby Hunter | 3:36 |
| 3. | "Native Born" | Archie Roach | 4:02 |
| 4. | "Tjapukai Sunset" | Tjapukai Dancers | 2:12 |
| 5. | "Wongga Initiation Song" | Rimijmara | 1:44 |
| 6. | "Bullima" | Mark Atkins | 4:34 |
| 7. | "Kava Song" | Waak Waak Jungi | 5:53 |
| 8. | "Birth Songs" | Mornington Island Dancers | 2:30 |
| 9. | "Drag Net" | Jimmy Murray | 1:20 |
| 10. | "Heart of My People" | Tjapukai Dancers | 6:08 |
| 11. | "Sik O" | Christine Anu | 3:13 |
| 12. | "Nyindi-Yindi" | Arnhem Land | 3:47 |
| 13. | "Buthamar" | Budal Lardil | 3:08 |
| 14. | "Celebration" | Gapu | 4:47 |
| 15. | "Bushfire" | Alan Maralung | 3:33 |
| 16. | "Black" | David Page | 11:54 |
