= Nedelchev =

Nedelchev (Bulgarian: Неделчев), female form Nedelcheva (Bulgarian: Неделчева), is a Bulgarian surname.

Notable people with this surname include:

- Deyan Nedelchev (born 1964), Bulgarian pop singer
- Mariya Gabriel (née Nedelcheva) (born 1979), Bulgarian politician
- Petya Nedelcheva (born 1983), Bulgarian badminton player
- Radi Nedelchev (1938–2022), Bulgarian artist
- Stefan Nedelchev (born 1996), Bulgarian footballer
- Yonko Nedelchev (born 1974), Bulgarian footballer
