= Esma Redžepova discography =

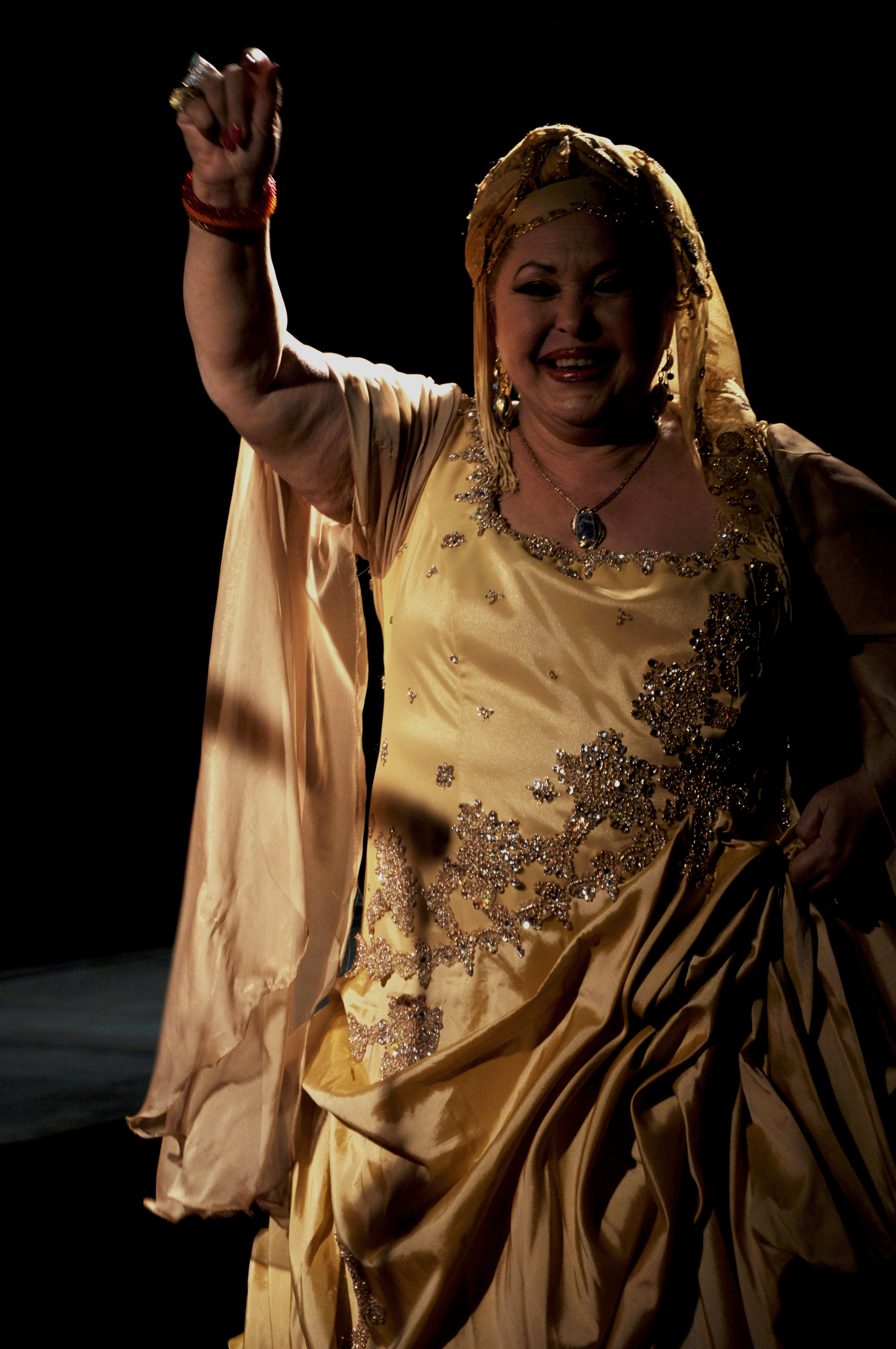
- Esma Redžepova in 2010
- Studio albums: 24
- EPs: 15
- Compilation albums: 3
- Singles: 18

This is the discography of Macedonian-Romani and former Yugoslav singer-songwriter Esma Redžepova. This discography consists of 24 studio albums, 18 7-inch singles, 15 EPs, and 3 compilation albums. This list does not include collaboration on projects by other acts or artists.

== Studio albums ==
| Title | Released | Label | Contributing artists |
|---|---|---|---|
| Zapej Makedonijo | 1967 | PGP-RTB | Ansambl Teodosievski |
| Makedonske pesme i Esma Redžepova | 1970 | Jugoton | Ansambl Teodosievski |
| Ciganske pesme i kola | 1971 | Jugoton | Ansambl Teodosievski |
| Zošto Si Me, Majko, Rodila | 1974 | Jugoton | Ansambl Teodosievski |
| Belly Dances | 1975 | PGP-RTB | Ansambl Teodosievski |
| Čočeci | 1976 | PGP-RTB | Ansambl Teodosievski |
| Makedonske pesme i ora - Ciganske pesme i čočeci | 1977 | PGP-RTB | Ansambl Teodosievski |
| Kroz Jugoslaviju | 1977 | PGP-RTB | Ansambl Teodosievski |
| Volim te, veruj mi | 1978 | PGP-RTB | Ansambl Teodosievski |
| Abre Ramče | 1979 | | Ansambl Teodosievski |
| Ah, Devla | 1980 | Jugoton | Ansambl Teodosievski |
| Zovu me dete celog sveta | 1980 | PGP-RTB | Ansambl Teodosievski |
| Esma | 1980 | PGP-RTB | Ansambl Teodosievski |
| Makedonska ora i čočeci | 1987 | PGP-RTB | Ansambl Teodosievski |
| Chaje Shukarije | 2000 | World Connection | |
| Esma's Dream | 2000 | MRT Music | Duke B. |
| Esma Redžepova | 2005 | Grand Production | |
| Srce cigansko | 2005 | Grand Production | Ansambl Teodosievski |
| Čekaj živote | 2006 | Mister Company | |
| Gypsy Carpet | 2007 | Network Medien | Ansambl Teodosievski |
| Mon histoire, My Story | 2007 | Accords croisés | Ansambl Teodosievski |
| Legends of Gypsy Music from Macedonia | 2008 | ARC Music | Ferus Mustafov |
| Tu me duj Džene | 2008 | Mister Company | Ansambl Teodosievski |
| Čoček | 2011 | Sony Music Entertainment | |

== Extended plays ==
| Title | Released | Label | Contributing artist |
|---|---|---|---|
| Abre babi sokerdžan | 1961 | Jugoton | Ansambl Teodosievski |
| Nino, Nino | 1962 | Jugoton | Ansambl Teodosievski |
| Ciganske pesme | 1962 | Jugoton | Ansambl Teodosievski |
| Pesme iz filma Krst Rakoc | 1962 | Jugoton | Ansambl Teodosievski |
| Opa Nina, Nina naj | 1965 | Jugoton | Ansambl Teodosievski |
| Pevaju pesme iz Makedonije | 1965 | Jugoton | Ansambl Teodosievski; Enver Rasimov |
| Makedonske narodne pesme | 1966 | Jugoton | Ansambl Teodosievski; Nikola Badev |
| Romano oro | 1966 | Jugoton | Ansambl Teodosievski |
| Ah, devla | 1967 | Jugoton | Ansambl Teodosievski |
| Zapej Makedonijo | 1969 | PGP-RTB | Ansambl Teodosievski; Krste Kitanovski |
| Ohrid, Ohrid | 1972 | PGP-RTB | Ansambl Teodosievski |
| Makedonijo, rosno cveće | 1972 | PGP-RTB | Ansambl Teodosievski |
| Svadbarski pesni | 1973 | PGP-RTB | Ansambl Teodosievski |
| Stan' mesece | 1974 | PGP-RTB | Ansambl Teodosievski |

== Compilation albums ==
| Title | Released | Label | Contributing artists |
|---|---|---|---|
| Songs of a Macedonian Gypsy | 1994 | Monitor Records | Usnija Jašarova |
| Romske pesme | 2002 | PGP-RTS | Ansambl Teodosievski |
| Čaje šukarije (18 izvornih snimaka (1961 – 1966)) | 2002 | Croatia Records | Ansambl Teodosievski |

== Singles ==
| Title | Released | Label | Contributing artists |
|---|---|---|---|
| Devojčence, će ti kupam fustan | 1963 | Jugoton | Ansambl Teodosievski; Boris Angelkovski |
| Ciganske pjesme | 1963 | Jugoton | Ansambl Teodosievski |
| Muška voda | 1966 | Adriatic Club | Ansambl Teodosievski |
| Odžačar, odžačar | 1970 | Jugoton | Ansambl Teodosievski |
| Esma pesma | 1973 | PGP-RTB | Ansambl Teodosievski |
| Čuješ li uzdah moj | 1974 | PGP-RTB | Ansambl Teodosievski |
| Kaži, kaži, libe Stano | 1974 | PGP-RTB | Ansambl Teodosievski |
| Za tebe, zemljo moja | 1974 | PGP-RTB | Ansambl Teodosievski |
| Volim te, veruj mi | 1975 | PGP-RTB | Ansambl Teodosievski |
| Sastali se cigani | 1975 | PGP-RTB | Ansambl Teodosievski |
| Kalejaca jaca | 1976 | PGP-RTB | Ansambl Teodosievski |
| Kočani, Kočani | 1976 | PGP-RTB | Ansambl Teodosievski |
| Da li voliš Aliju | 1977 | PGP-RTB | Ansambl Teodosievski |
| Kavadarci, Kavadarci | 1977 | PGP-RTB | Ansambl Teodosievski |
| Heba | 1977 | PGP-RTB | Ansambl Teodosievski |
| Kaži Slave, kaži ćerko | 1980 | PGP-RTB | Ansambl Teodosievski |
| Ciganka je malena | 1980 | PGP-RTB | Ansambl Teodosievski |
| Čerga mala luta preko sveta | 1980 | PGP-RTB | Ansambl Teodosievski |
