= The Rough Guide to World Roots =

Compilation album by Various artists
- Released: 28 September 1999
- Genres: World, Folk, Roots revival
- Length: 77:28
- Label: World Music Network

Full series chronology
The Rough Guide to Australian Aboriginal Music (1999)	The Rough Guide to World Roots (1999)	The Rough Guide to Cajun & Zydeco (1998)

The Rough Guide to World Roots is a world music compilation album originally released in 1999. Part of the World Music Network Rough Guides series, the album gives broad coverage to global folk and roots revival music.

Five of the fourteen tracks come from The Americas (Ecuador, Cuba [2], USA, & Brazil), three from Asia (Uzbekistan, Indonesia, Pakistan), three from Europe (Belgium, Italy, Hungary), and three from Africa (South Africa and Senegal [2]). The compilation was produced by Phil Stanton, co-founder of the World Music Network.

== Critical reception ==
Professional ratings
Review scores
Source	Rating
AllMusic	4/5 stars

Writing for AllMusic, Heather Phares claimed the album "delivers what its title promises", calling it a "solid grounding" in world roots music.

== Track listing ==
No.	Title	Artist (Country)	Length
1.	"Schoch Va Gado"	Yulduz Usmonova (Uzbekistan)	6:48
2.	"Marifnaash"	Natacha Atlas (Belgium)	4:46
3.	"Yehlisan'umoya Ma-Afrika"	Busi Mhlongo (South Africa)	5:26
4.	"Teï"	Fania (Senegal)	5:02
5.	"Lam Tooro"	Baaba Maal & Mansour Seck (Senegal)	6:41
6.	"Andarele"	Carmen Gonzalez & Koral Y Esmeralda (Ecuador)	4:17
7.	"Amor Verdadero"	Afro-Cuban All Stars (Cuba)	6:37
8.	"Campesina"	Daboa (United States)	3:47
9.	"Awina/Ijain Je E'"	Marlui Miranda (Brazil)	2:01
10.	"El Platanal de Bartolo"	¡Cubanismo! (Cuba)	4:46
11.	"L'Inglese"	La Piva dal Carner (Italy)	4:48
12.	"Teremtés"	Márta Sebestyén (Hungary)	4:05
13.	"Duriran"	Detty Kurnia (Indonesia)	3:53
14.	"Man Atkeya Béparwath Dé Naal"	Nusrat Fateh Ali Khan (Pakistan)	14:31
