= Leeke Homestead =

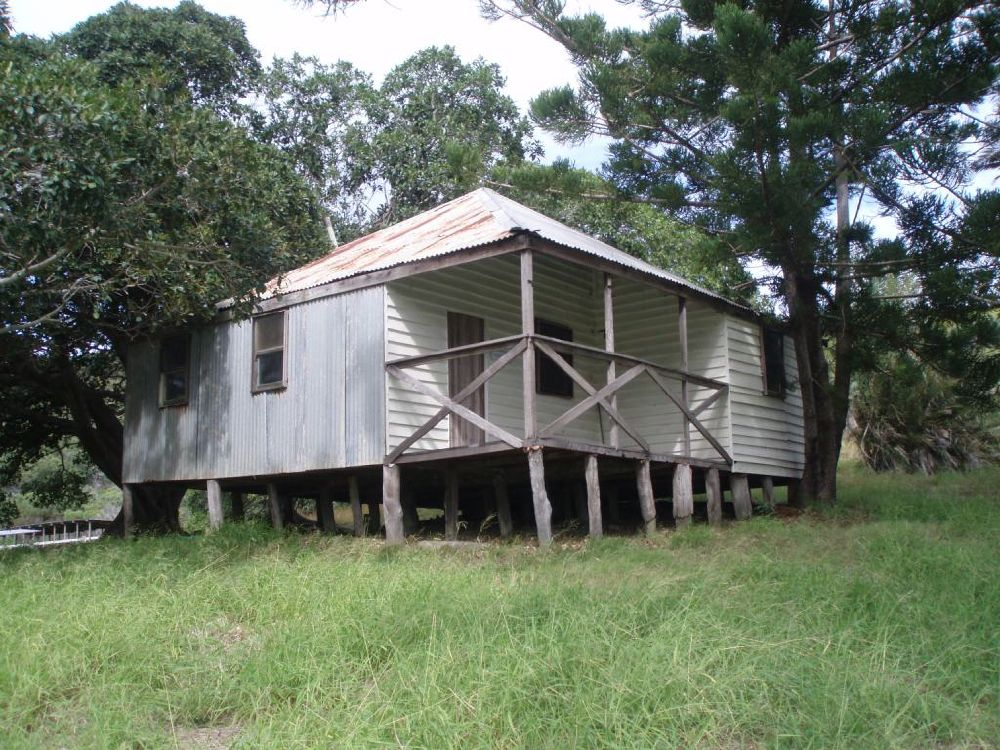
- Leeke Homestead, 2009

- Location within Queensland Location within Australia
- 23.1767°S 150.9564°E
- Location: Great Keppel Island, Shire of Livingstone, Queensland, Australia

History
- Design period: 1919–1930s (interwar period)
- Built: c. 1922–c. 1924

Queensland Heritage Register
- Official name: Leeke Homestead
- Type: state heritage (built)
- Designated: 28 July 2000
- Reference no.: 601216
- Significant period: 1920s–1940s (historical); 1920s (fabric)
- Significant components: farmhouse

Leeke Homestead is a heritage-listed homestead at Great Keppel Island, Shire of Livingstone, Queensland, Australia. It was built from c. 1922 to c. 1924. It was added to the Queensland Heritage Register on 28 July 2000.

== History ==
Leeke Homestead, constructed c.1922–24 is a basic, timber and corrugated iron residence located on Great Keppel Island, near Yeppoon. The house was the home of Lizzie Leeke (formerly O'Neill) who lived on the island from 1922 until 1945. She originally moved to Great Keppel from Gladstone with her husband Michael O'Neill and they depastured sheep on the island from 1918 when they purchased the pastoral lease on the island. The O'Neills were by no means pioneers of the island, Great Keppel had been occupied by Europeans for over fifty years by the time they took up the lease. In these fifty years, dramatic and tragic events had already occurred in order to enable white occupation of the islands.

Captain James Cook sailed into Keppel Bay in 1770 and named the bay and islands after his superior in England, Rear Admiral Augustus Keppel. There were subsequent visits by other exploratory parties, however, white exploitation of Great Keppel Island began in earnest in 1866. Prominent Central Queensland squatter, Robert Ross, obtained leases over both Great Keppel and North Keppel Islands "from year to year and not exceeding five years" in partnership with C.E Beddome and Sir Arthur Palmer (MLA for Port Curtis, 1866–78 and Minister for Lands 1866–69). Over the next year, Ross began to "prepare" the island as a cattle property by driving 84 indigenous people into a cave and murdering them. In 1882, Ross acquired secure tenure for Great Keppel Island through land dummying, and depastured 4000 sheep on the island.

W. T Wyndham became stockkeeper for Ross and declared himself the first European to live permanently on the island. Despite his association with Ross, who was justifiably feared by the Aboriginal peoples, Wyndham was able to establish a good relationship with the Keppel Islanders. He had previously worked for Dr Walter Roth, the Northern Protector of Aboriginal peoples and had lived previously with Aboriginal people in New South Wales. Wyndham was a remarkable man who went on to make his home at Boyne Island, near Gladstone. He spoke a number of Aboriginal languages and recorded much valuable anthropological data in his diaries. On the island, Mount Wyndham and Wyndham Cove are named for him, his grave on Boyne Island, near Gladstone, is entered in the Queensland Heritage Register.

In September 1883, Ross came across to Great Keppel and kidnapped seven men and twenty three women and children by luring them onto a boat with the promise of food. Wyndham resigned and told the story to the "Queensland Figaro" which ran the story titled, "Kidnapping Keppel Island Blacks." A public battle of claims and counter-claims followed. Years later, Dr W Roth, using Wyndham's diaries and his own observations, stated that "human lives were sacrificed for sheep."

Ross died in 1893 and his family nearly lost control of the islands until his brother Colin re-acquired the lease. James Lucas came to the island with his family and took up as stockkeeper, soon acquiring a reputation for cruelty and maltreatment of the remaining Keppel Islanders. By this time, the run had a two-roomed weatherboard house, a small shearing shed and several small fenced sheepyards. This house is not the Leeke Homestead and was located closer to the creek. The shearing shed, however, was subsequently used by Lizzie. By 1902, Archibald Meston, the Southern Protector of Aboriginal peoples had removed the remaining Keppel Islanders to government reserves, including the one at Fraser Island.

Lucas, who had acquired the leases from the Ross family, forfeited them in 1903. For many years after the removal of the Aboriginal peoples, the Keppel Islands attracted little interest. They were used mainly by boating parties and although several leases were issued, no stock was depastured and nor did anyone live on the island before the 1920s. The grazing lease for Great Keppel, covering almost the entire island was transferred to Michael O'Neill in 1918. O'Neill, who had several farm properties near Gladstone, unsuccessfully sought a more secure tenure than occupation licence through the support of George Carter, MLA for Port Curtis. O'Neill had depastured 1500 merino sheep upon taking up the lease and he and Lizzie moved to the island to live permanently in 1922; however, O'Neill died soon after in early 1923. Lizzie stayed on and "remained as a resolute and colourful character on the island for twenty-three years."

In October 1924, she married Ralph Leeke, a young fisherman from Keppel Sands. Lizzie continued to run sheep on the island and Ralph worked as a fisherman – they were considered an eccentric couple, not least because Lizzie was about 17 years older than Ralph. There is uncertainty about whether it was Leeke or O'Neill who built the homestead. Accounts from the Leeke family claim that Ralph took a barge to his home in Keppel Sands, dismantled the house and shipped it back to the island. He landed at the shearing shed and carried the material up the hill and re-built the house. The shearing shed remained from previous lease-holders, however, a new site was chosen for the homestead. Other accounts claim that O' Neill built the homestead before he died.

Bill Leeke, Ralph's nephew, spent many holidays on the island in the 1920s and 30s. He remembered the homestead thus:

I slept on the verandah of the Homestead on a stretcher bed. The bed had a spread made of possum skins lined with a cloth material. It crackled a bit when you sat on it. Possums were declared a pest and the Government paid a shilling a skin. The floor of the house was littered with possum skin rugs. The windows in the front of the house looking onto the verandah had curtains and the doorways had hanging screens made from reeds that grew in the salt pan and along the creek. There was a small parlour with lace cloths on occasional tables with pieces of coral and rare shells. The kitchen was at the back of the house and that is where we ate. Although the house was built of corrugated iron it had a woman's touch and always seemed cool and homely to me.

In 1933 Ralph left Lizzie and the island and Lizzie was left by herself to run the stock. The mid-1930s saw the beginning of a greater public use of the island, Fisherman's Beach was regularly being used by people as a camping area for various lengths of time. With the increase in the number of visitors to the island, stories of Lizzie and her life on the island became more common. Comments were often made of the physical and mental toughness of the woman to be able to not only survive on the island, but to also run the sheep successfully. Apart from shearing time when a shearer and wool classer would come to the island, the only help she had was from her two dogs.

Lizzie sold the lease in 1945 and died on the mainland a few years later. The lease passed through several hands and it appears that the homestead was never lived in permanently again as consequent lease holders built other houses on the island. In 1971, the grazing lease and the homestead were sold to the resort management at the time. The resort management retain tenure of the property. The shearing shed has been re-built and the homestead has been repaired and partly furnished and interpreted as Lizzie's home. Visits to the homestead are offered as an activity for guests at the resort.

== Description ==
Leeke Homestead is located on Great Keppel Island, east of Yeppoon. The Homestead is on the northern side of the island on a hillside overlooking tidal mangrove plains and Leeke's Beach beyond. The homestead is accessible by 4wd vehicle or walking. A simple timberlog fence defines the boundary around the homestead paddock. The house is sheltered by large spreading fig trees with several large, weatherbeaten Hoop Pines and Date Palms scattered throughout the yard. A number of recent, ancillary buildings are also located within this paddock.

The homestead is a simple square plan building with a pyramidal roof form without eaves. it is elevated on short timber stumps. Both the walls and roof are clad with corrugated iron, with some sections of weatherboards including those lining a small verandah on the north- west side of the house. This verandah has cross-braced balustrades, effectively the only external "decoration" on the house.

Internally, the house has six rooms. Floors throughout are wide boards of rough-sawn timber and walls and ceilings are lined with painted plywood with coverstrips. The former kitchen is located on the eastern side of the building with a large stove recess that used to accommodate a wood stove. The recess is clad externally with corrugated iron and has a galvanised steel flue. A recent kitchen and bathroom has been fitted in a small room in the north-east corner off the kitchen, that was previously a small bedroom (where Bill Leeke used to sleep as a boy). The largest interior space is the living room which is now furnished with a few pieces of period furniture and has framed family pictures on the walls. A small store room is located on the southern side of the living space, adjacent to the large bedroom. The largest bedroom is L-shaped in plan and has vinyl floor sheeting. The only internal doors are to the store room and bedroom. Windows throughout the house are double-hung, unpainted timber sashes.

The woolshed is constructed on the tidal plain. It has been recently re-built and has a concrete slab floor, structural timber frame and galvanised steel cladding.

== Heritage listing ==
Leeke Homestead was listed on the Queensland Heritage Register on 28 July 2000 having satisfied the following criteria.

The place is important in demonstrating the evolution or pattern of Queensland's history.

Leeke Homestead is important in demonstrating the evolution of Queensland's history, being a representation of the development of Great Keppel Island. The Homestead is a part of the story of attempts to establish viable pastoral operations on the island through the violent displacement of the indigenous population. The Homestead is the only remaining physical link between the 4000 years of Woppaburra occupation and the tourist development that now dominates the island. Leeke Homestead illustrates the tenacity and determination of Lizzie Leeke in staying on the island for so long, tolerating isolation and flouting social convention in order to live the independent life of her choosing.

The place is important in demonstrating the principal characteristics of a particular class of cultural places.

Leeke Homestead demonstrates the principal characteristics of an isolated island residence. Built by the owner, at a time when the transport of materials was difficult and skilled labour was unavailable, Leeke Homestead is distinctive as an example of the kinds of dwellings erected under such circumstances in remote locations along the Queensland coast.

The place is important because of its aesthetic significance.

Leeke Homestead is of aesthetic significance, due to its setting among Hoop Pines and fig trees on a high point of the island. The simple design and rudimentary construction techniques contribute to its aesthetic qualities and assist in the integration of the house in the landscape.
