= Ferus Mustafov =

Romani musician (1950–2023)

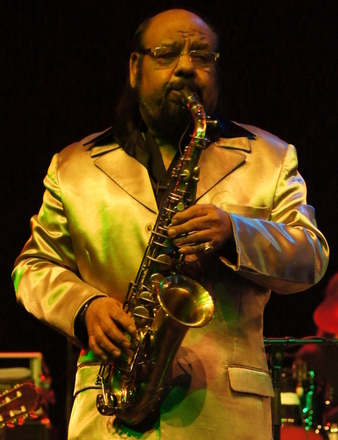
- Mustafov performing in 2018

Background information
- Also known as: King Ferus
- Born: 20 December 1950; Štip, PR Macedonia, FPR Yugoslavia
- Died: 22 May 2023 (aged 72) Skopje, North Macedonia
- Genres: Balkan folk and Romani music
- Occupation: Musician
- Instruments: Saxophone, violin, clarinet, pipe
- Years active: 1967–2023

Ferus Mustafov (Macedonian: Ферус Мустафов; 20 December 1950 – 22 May 2023), also known as King Ferus, was a Macedonian Romani saxophonist and clarinetist. Known as the "King of the Romani music", he was a major figure in Yugoslav and Macedonian folk music. He was also credited as one of the artists from the Balkan region to have made this region's Romani music internationally popular.

== Biography ==
Mustafov was born on 20 December 1950 in Štip, Yugoslavia, into a Xoraxane family of musicians. He was the son of saxophonist Ilmi Jašarov, who is credited with introducing the saxophone into the folk music of the area. His mother, Zumbrut, was also a saxophonist, although she was not a professional.

His professional career began at the age of seventeen whilst studying violin and clarinet at his local junior music academy. During this time he was invited to go on tour with a band led by Toma Črčev, the tour's success led him to abandon his academic learning to become a working musician.

Following a year of military service, during which he established his reputation playing at evening dances, he moved to Sarajevo, Bosnia and Herzegovina, where he took a leading role in the explosion in popularity of folk music taking place there at the time. He exchanged tunes with Bulgarian musician Ivo Papazov on the telephone in the 1980s because travel to Yugoslavia from Bulgaria was not allowed. Mustafov performed musical pieces based on melodies composed by Papazov. He was influenced by his father and Bulgarian wedding music. Later he became a director of musical programming in the Romani language for Radio Television in Skopje, and gained an international audience through his album releases on world music record labels such as Globe Style and Tropical. Mustafov was among the first Macedonian Romani instrumentalists to regularly appear on Western recordings. He died in the early morning of 22 May 2023 in Skopje after having a stroke, at the age of 72. His son, Ilmi Mustafov, is a musician.

== Discography ==
=== Albums ===
- Ora i Coceci (Horas And Belly Dance Music) (1984), RTB
- Ferus Mustafov & His Guests: 1 + 4 (1989), Diskos
- Najgolemi Hitovi (Greatest Hits) (1993), Falcon
- King Ferus also known as Macedonian Wedding Soul Cooking (1995), Globe Style
- The Heat of Balkan Gypsy Soul (2002), Tropical
- Legends of Gypsy Music from Macedonia (2008), Arc

=== Singles ===
- "Митино Коло" (1978), PGP-RTB

=== Compilation appearances ===
- Ring Ring 1996 (1997), B92
- The Rough Guide to the Music of Eastern Europe (1999), World Music Network
