= The Rough Guide to the Music of Eastern Europe =

Compilation album by Various artists
- Released: 29 September 1998
- Genres: World, Central European, Eastern European
- Length: 73:22
- Label: World Music Network

Full series chronology
Unwired: Acoustic Music from Around the World (1999)	The Rough Guide to the Music of Eastern Europe (1998)	The Rough Guide to the Music of Portugal (1998)

The Rough Guide to the Music of Eastern Europe is a world music compilation album originally released in 1998. Part of the World Music Network Rough Guides series, the album gives broad coverage to the music of Central Europe and the music of Eastern Europe, focusing on traditional styles. Five of the fifteen tracks hail from Bulgaria, four are from Hungary, two are Macedonian, and Romania, Russia, Poland, and Albania contribute one track each. The compilation was produced by Phil Stanton, co-founder of the World Music Network.

== Critical reception ==
Professional ratings
Review scores
Source	Rating
AllMusic	3/5 stars

Steven McDonald of AllMusic called it "good" but "curiously unsatisfying", blaming the size of the area covered. Writing for the Voice of America traditional music program Roots & Branches, Jo Morrison was more positive, considering the wide scope a "wonderful whirlwind tour", and the CD a continuation of the "high-quality" tradition of the series.

== Track listing ==
No.	Title	Artist (Country)	Length
1.	"Devoiko Mome"	Márta Sebestyén (Hungary)	4:50
2.	"Spune, Spune, Moș Bătrîn..."	Taraf de Haïdouks (Romania)	5:28
3.	"Kürbis"	Apparatschik (Russia)	3:52
4.	"L'Orient Est Rouge"	Kocani Orkestar feat. Naat Veliov (North Macedonia)	6:05
5.	"Zaplakala E Gorata"	Trio Bulgarka (Bulgaria)	3:55
6.	"Staro Ćunovo Oro/Velesko Oro"	Ferus Mustafov (North Macedonia)	4:39
7.	"Calusul"	Kálmán Balogh & The Gipsy Cimbalom Band (Hungary)	4:33
8.	"2 Wierchowe, Ozwodna, 2 Krzesane, 2 Drobne"	Trebunia Family Band (Poland)	6:00
9.	"Ezüstmuzsika"	Vízöntő (Hungary)	3:40
10.	"Beautiful Milka"	The Mystery of Bulgarian Voices Choir (Bulgaria)	4:24
11.	"Danubian Daichovo Horo"	"Horo" Orchestra (Bulgaria)	3:35
12.	"Mamo Marie Mamo"	Ivo Papasov & His Bulgarian Wedding Band (Bulgaria)	4:23
13.	"The Mountain Pacular"	Zsarátnok (Hungary)	7:40
14.	"Valle E Lezhës"	Mark Pashku (Albania)	2:34
15.	"Anonym"	Nikola Parov (Bulgaria)	7:44
