= Mark Atkins (musician) =

Australian Aboriginal musician

- Mark Atkins at a festival in Maastricht, 2001

Background information
- Born: Albany, Western Australia
- Instrument: Didgeridoo
- Website: http://www.mark-atkins.com

Mark Atkins is an Australian Aboriginal musician known for his skill on the didgeridoo, a traditional instrument.

Mark Atkins is also a storyteller, songwriter, composer and painter. He descends from the Yamatji people of Western Australia. He was the 1990 winner of the Golden Didjeridu competition. He has worked with Robert Plant and Jimmy Page of Led Zeppelin, Hothouse Flowers, Marlene Cummins, Philip Glass, The Black Arm Band and the London Philharmonic Orchestra, among others.

In Didgeridoo Concerto (1994) he plays for over 50 minutes continuously using the circular breathing technique; an unofficial world record at the time.

In 2001, he collaborated with Wurundjeri elder Joy Murphy Wandin and composer Philip Glass in the concert work Voices, performed at the Melbourne Town Hall and New York's Lincoln Center. The composition was commissioned by the City of Melbourne to relaunch the Melbourne Town Hall Organ.

Atkins was profiled in the television documentary "Yamatji Man" in 2003.

== Discography ==
- Didgeridoo Concerto, 1994
- Plays Didgeridoo, 1995
- Didgeridoo Dreamtime, ARC Music, 1999
- The Sound of Gondwana: 176,000 Years in the Making (compilation), Black Sun Music/Celestial Harmonies, 1997
- The Rough Guide to Australian Aboriginal Music (compilation), World Music Network
- City Circles
- Ankala : Rhythms from the outer core, World Network
- Ankala & World Orchestra : Didje Blows the Games, World Network
- Walkabout
- Creeper Vines and Time, Maguari Productions
- Didge Odyssey, 2006
- The Reason To Breathe, 2006
- The Bushman, (independent release), 2010
- Dreamtime, ARC Music, 2011

== See also ==
- List of Australian Aboriginal musicians
- Music of Australia
