= Wapabara =

Aboriginal Australian people

The Wapabara, also known as Woppaburra, are an Aboriginal Australian people whose traditional lands are on Greater and South Keppel islands.

== Language ==
According to an early sojourner, C. T. Wyndham, the language spoken was divided into two distinct dialects, northern and southern. This was disputed by another white informant who said that mainland Aboriginal people in that area could understand the Woppaburra language.

== Ecology and lifestyle ==
White settlers described the Woppaburas small in stature, the hair of a reddish-brown tint, and their bodies covered in downy hair and living predominantly in natural caverns, and subsisting on a diet of fish and tubers since natural land game, such as kangaroos, opossums and wallabies, was absent from the island. Their numbers, as pastoral lease-holders began to establish a foothold on their territory in the 1860s, were believed to be about 60 people, and W. T. Wyndham reported later that during his own sojourn on the island in 1883–4, he counted 54. Archibald Meston in 1902 estimated the original population before contact to be around 200. Disparities overall numbers may reflect headcounts for the separate islands, and Rowland makes an estimate of the total Woppaburra before contact to be around 60 on South Keppel and a further 25 on the northern island.

== Anthropometrics ==
Anthropometric studies have suggested the Woppaburra are quite distinct from the mainland peoples, one 1976 study concluding that, their bone remains constitute the "most striking instance we have seen of micro-evolution" within the Australian Aboriginal people.

== History ==
According to Michael Rowland, an authority on the Woppaburra writing in part to reply to the skepticism about reports of genocide advanced by Keith Windschuttle, the first visit of whites to the island, in 1865, occasioned a massacre of seven/eight members of the tribe: not mentioned in the report of the expedition, which spoke of an incident in which the group had saved a fleeing Aboriginal woman after she fell into the sea and injured herself, this or perhaps an earlier occasion of slaughter, was pointed out by tribal people later, who showed a hundred-yard line pitted with the skeletal remains of the Woppaburra who had been killed, and several males, accused of killing some sheep, were transported off the terrain, to Yeppoon, where the local tribes viewed them with hostility. The then lessee however stated that a full 30 had been removed, at their request, to the mainland, and relocated, after landing at a place 10 miles south of Cape Manifold, at the Water Park Native Reserve, while leaving only two women behind. Robert Ross's pastoral lease ran 3–4,000 sheep on island. Another white version at the time (1883) claimed that the Woppaburra were not native to the island but had managed, being part of a mainland tribe, to get over to the island and kill a 100 sheep, and that this accounted for their removal. According to testimony given to Walter Roth, however, some whites and mainland blacks had descended on the island, and hunted up all the Woppaburra women and children they could find, and had them transported back to the coast. "Human lives were sacrificed for sheep," was his conclusion. Ross may have shifted them to the mainland to supply cheap labour for the property at Taranganba.

Deracinated on the mainland, and unable to adapt to Yeppoon conditions, where they eventually were said to have retired to, reports quickly noted that the transported group was rapidly dying off -though one man, Yoolowa/Lowoo, was said to have swum back to Keppel island and others were eaten by sharks in attempts to get back to their homeland- as a result of "coast fever" and an inability to live off the different diet. Corpses of Woppaburra were found here and there in scrubland and along the beaches. Reports from the mid-1880s indicate that some Woppaburra remained on the island, used as cheap labour on the sheep-runs, men and women whipped along as, harnassed to a plough, they were forced to furrow the soil, and fed tidbits thrown their way by whites. They were chained to a tidal cave if they refused to work.

Something akin to frontier warfare, involving not only shootings, poisonings, and being driven into the sea, but also theft of their women by Japanese pearlers, appears to have struck the Woppaburra, according to the tales handed down by descendants of the tribe in both Yeppoon and Emu Park.

Ross's Keppel interests were taken over by his foreman, James Lucas, in 1897 and he moved the Woppaburra to South Keppel island near his homestead. At the same time, in the late 1890s, a dispute over territorial competence arose between the northern protector of Queensland's aboriginal peoples, and his southern colleague Archibald Meston. Roth insisted they not be dislocated from the islands, and was thought to favour the lessee's interests, while Meston was shocked by the degraded conditions to which the Woppaburra had been reduced in the introduced pastoralist environment. Roth reported 19 Woppaburra people on the island in 1898, 3 of them male, and 16 female, a disparity he attributed to the character of the Europeans who frequented the isle. Meston wanted them shifted to Fraser Island to isolate them from sexually predatory whites and fishermen.

The remaining members of the Woppaburra were forcibly removed from the island in 1902, though one descendant claims his family was removed 8 years later, in 1910. The skeletal remains of 2 Woppaburra people were removed to museum holdings in London, in the 1920s, and were conserved at the Royal College of Surgeons and London's Natural History Museum. In the early 1980s The Keppel Islands Lifestyle Aborigninal Corporation (K.I.L.A.C) was formed by the initiative of Woppaburra descendants Elders Aunty Ethel Richards, Aunty Linette Van Issum, Aunty Glenice Croft, Aunty Bessy Cately, Uncle Robbie Barney, Michelle Croft and Angela Van Issum (later Leitch). In 1983, Elder Aunty Ethel Richards and Angela Van Issum returned to Great Keppel Island marking the return of a child from those taken in 1902. The only known return of those forcibly removed was in the 1950s when Munquadum returned with his grandson. When the K.I.L.A.C media person Aunty Glenice Croft contacted Michael Rowland after media coverage about Mr Rowland's archaeological survey on the Keppel Islands, he met Aunty Ethel Richards, Aunty Glenice Croft, Aunty Linette Van Issum and others. This and Aunty Ethel Richards return led to the first Woppaburra reunion return in 1984 when 40 descendants met up on Great Keppel Island.

== Native title ==
On 3 December 2021 the Woppaburra people were formally recognised as native title holders. Their native title determination area covers 567 square kilometres (219 mi^{2}) and includes Woppa (Great Keppel formerly known as South Keppel) and Konomie (North Keppel).

Almost 120 years ago, the Woppaburra people were forcibly removed from their islands in central Queensland, enduring deep suffering, but in a historic ruling on 3 December 2021 the Woppaburra Peoples were recognised as native title holders, proving their unwavering connection to the Keppel Islands and waters of the Great Barrier Reef – Queensland, Australia.

"Woppaburra People are the only native title group to be removed from country for over 80 years and to achieve exclusive native titles rights over our country".

On 7 March 2014, the registration of a claim to native title made in November 2013 in the name of descendants of the Woppaburra was accepted by the National Native Title Tribunal.

== We Al-li ==
The term we al-li was adopted from the Woppaburra language to describe a therapy program devised for indigenous peoples affected by the historic traumas of dispossession, informed by the work of Alice Miller as well as by the need to provide a culturally safe environment in which people could "intellectualise" or make sense of their experiences. We means "fire" and refers to both the symbolism of raging anger and its use in cleansing the earth to make way for new spring growth, in turn referring to the sacred responsibilities of taking care of country and also of people. Al-li means "water" and refers to both the symbolism of deep grieving and its essential life-giving and healing properties, in the form of rain and the ways it moves through the landscape, following the tracks of Moonda Nghadda. Taken together, we al-li describes the great anger and pain felt in the self and for others, the cleansing process crucial to recovery and regeneration, the grieving process necessary to restore the health of the community, and the healing process that results.

== Descendants ==
Some 300 Australians trace their origins to the Woppaburra of the Keppel Islands.

Elders

- Konomie Richards (1883/5-1973), native name, Boombilwan, died, aged 90. at Acacia Ridge, Brisbane in 1973.
- Ethel Richards, the daughter of Konomie, was still alive in 2004
- Chrissy Hansen-Doherty.
- Albert Ross/Peters (Munquadom) last initiated young Woppaburra male removed 1900s, his daughter is Lillian Peters, her traditional name is Kalulu. She had twelve children. Alive (2024) are Linette Russ (previously Van Issum), Gordon Barney, Glenice Croft, Bess Catley, Valmai Burns, Christine Williams and Vanessa Rogers.

Notable Descendants

- Angela Leitch (Barney), First Aboriginal female Deputy Vice-Chancellor at a Queensland University (June 2022). As at May 2026, she was a Deputy Vice Chancellor, and Head of Logan campus for Griffith university.https://www.griffith.edu.au/office-vice-chancellor/university-executive
- Dr Harry Van Issum (Sonny), Phd, Griffith University First Woppaburra to receive a PhD.
- Dr Julie Rogers, (Goodedulla) PhD, Central Queensland University, First Woppaburra female to receive a PhD.
- Jackson Van Issum, Lead singer and front man of Aria nominated Australian Surf Rock band, The Beddy Rays.
- Muriel Conomie Stanley (1918–1979) Australia's first Aboriginal midwife.
- Justine Florence Saunders (1953–2007), stage, television and film actress.
- Marlene Cummins, jazz blues singer, saxophonist, song writer and activist. A short film on her activism "Black Panther Women" was released in 2014.
- Wayne Blair, Australian writer, actor and director.

== Sources ==
- Atkinson, Judy (2002). Trauma Trails, Recreating Song Lines: The Transgenerational Effects of Trauma in Indigenous Australia. Spinifex Press. ISBN 978-1-876-75622-2.
- Atkinson, Judy; Ober, Coralie (1995). "We Al-Li "Fire and Water": A Process of Healing". In Hazlehurst, Kayleen M. (ed.). Popular Justice and Community Regeneration: Pathways of Indigenous Reform. Greenwood Publishing Group. pp. 201–218. ISBN 978-0-275-95131-3.
- "Extract from the Register of Native Title Claims Robert Muir Snr & Ors on behalf of the Woppaburra People v State of Queensland (Woppaburra People)" (PDF). National Native Title Tribunal. 19 December 2014.
- Gately, Michelle (18 August 2015). "Chrissy spends decades to find Woppaburra ancestor in UK". The Morning Bulletin.
- Roth, Walter E. (15 November 1910). "North Queensland Ethnography: Social and individual nomenclature". Records of the Australian Museum. 8 (1): 79–106. doi:10.3853/j.0067-1975.8.1910.936 – via Internet Archive.
- Rowland, Michael (2001). ""Crows", Swimming Logs and AuditoryExostoses: Isolation on the Keppel Islands and Broader Implications". In Ulm, Sean; Westcott, Catherine; Reid, Jill; Ross, Anne; Lilley, Ian; Kirkwood, Luke; Prangnell, Jon (eds.). Barriers, Borders, Boundaries. Tempus. Vol. 7. University of Queensland. pp. 61–73. ISBN 978-1-864-99568-8.
- Rowland, Michael (2004). "Myths and non-myths: Frontier 'massacres' in Australian history — the Woppaburra of the Keppel Islands". Journal of Australian Studies. 28 (81): 1–16. doi:10.1080/14443050409387934. S2CID 143534888.
- "Word Up: Shella Anunakiu". ABC listen. ABC. 10 February 2018.
