= Radostina Chitigoi =

Bulgarian volleyball player (born 1978)

Personal information
- Nationality: Bulgarian
- Born: 3 September 1978 (age 48)
- Height: 6 ft 2 in (188 cm)

Volleyball information
- Position: Outside-spiker
- Number: 11 (national team)

Career
Years	Teams
2009	Tomis Constanza

National team
2009	Bulgaria

Radostina Rangelova-Chitigoi (Bulgarian: Радостина Рангелова - Цитигой) (born 3 September 1978), formerly Radostina Gradeva (Bulgarian: Радостина Градева), is a Bulgarian female former volleyball player, playing as an outside-spiker. She was part of the Bulgaria women's national volleyball team.

She competed at the 2001 Women's European Volleyball Championship.

The 6ft 2in tall Chitigoi competed at the 2009 Women's European Volleyball Championship. On club level she played for Tomis Constanza in 2009. Rangelova was formerly married to Georgi Gradev, a football agent.
