= The Rough Guide to the Music of Portugal =

Compilation album by Various artists
- Released: 25 August 1998
- Genre: World, Portuguese
- Length: 68:33
- Label: World Music Network

Full series chronology
The Rough Guide to the Music of Eastern Europe (1998)	The Rough Guide to the Music of Portugal (1998)	The Rough Guide to Cajun & Zydeco' (1998)

The Rough Guide to the Music of Portugal is a world music compilation album originally released in 1998. Part of the World Music Network Rough Guides series, the album spotlights the music of Portugal, focusing on acoustic fado from the 1970s, 80s, and 90s. Co-founders of the World Music Network Phil Stanton and Sandra Alayón-Stanton produced and coordinated the album, respectively.

== Critical reception ==
Professional ratings
Review scores
Source	Rating
Allmusic	4.5/5 stars

Writing for AllMusic, Alex Henderson called the disc "an excellent place to start" for new listeners to fado, awarding it four and half stars.

== Track listing ==
No.	Title	Artist	Length
1.	"Saudades de Coimbra"	José Afonso	2:54
2.	"Fado da Sina"	Dulce Pontes	3:15
3.	"Canção do Gaiteiro / Dança do Gaiteiro / Marcha dos Foliões / Murinheira"	Realejo	4:56
4.	"Verdes São Os Campos"	Teresa Silva Carvalho	2:19
5.	"Despertar"	Carlos Paredes	3:52
6.	"Aí, Mouraria"	Amália Rodrigues	3:11
7.	"Contradança I (Auto da Floripes - Tema dos Turcos)"	Vai De Roda	2:52
8.	"O Rapaz Do Casaquito"	Terra a Terra	3:21
9.	"Décadas"	V Império	4:13
10.	"Barquinha do Mar"	Lendas & Mitos	3:50
11.	"Avenidas"	Anabela	4:14
12.	"Quem o Fado Calúnia"	Maria da Fé	2:22
13.	"Fala da Mulher Sózinha"	Margarida Bessa	2:53
14.	"Menina Estás á Janela"	Vitorino	3:14
15.	"Fado Em Cinco Estilos"	Maria Teresa de Noronha	3:00
16.	"Sou Um Fado Desta Idade"	Lenita Gentil	2:28
17.	"Maldito Fado"	Carlos Zel	4:18
18.	"A Alma do Ganhão (Fado do Alentejo)"	Manuel de Almeida	3:27
19.	"Cravo Roxo"	Ronda dos Quatro Caminhos	2:24
20.	"É Na Vila do Redondo"	Grupo Cantadores do Redondo	2:00
21.	"Grândola, Vila Morena"	José Afonso	3:30
