= Archontis Stoyianov =

Bulgarian footballer

Personal information
- Full name: Archontis Stoyianov
- Date of birth: 29 March 1996 (age 30)
- Place of birth: Bulgaria
- Height: 1.84 m (6 ft 0 in)
- Position: Defender

Team information
- Current team: AEZ Zakakiou

Youth career
- Aris

Senior career*
Years	Team	Apps	(Gls)
2017–	AEZ Zakakiou	3	(0)
- * Club domestic league appearances and goals as of January 16, 2018

Archontis Stoyianov (born 29 March 1996) is a Bulgarian footballer who plays as a defender for AEZ Zakakiou.
