= Milan Karatantchev =

Bulgarian footballer

Personal information
- Full name: Milan Lyubenov Karatantchev
- Date of birth: 17 August 1959 (age 67)
- Place of birth: Bulgaria

Milan Karatantchev (Bulgarian: Милан Каратанчев) (born 17 August 1959) is a Bulgarian former footballer who played as a goalkeeper for Belasitsa Petrich, Arda Kardzhali, and most notably for Botev Plovdiv, where he is considered a club legend. Following his retirement, he also became a referee. Subsequently, he was a secretary of the refereeing commission for the zonal council in Plovdiv. Outside of football, Karatantchev has also found employment as a firefighter.
