= Stanimir Dimitrov (footballer, born 1992) =

Bulgarian footballer

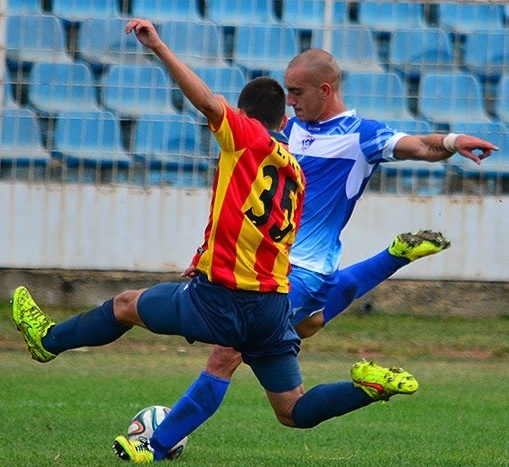
- Stanimir Dimitrov

Personal information
- Date of birth: 2 April 1992 (age 34)
- Place of birth: Plovdiv, Bulgaria
- Height: 1.83 m (6 ft 0 in)
- Position: Forward

Team information
- Current team: FC Vereya
- Number: 14

Youth career
- Maritsa Plovdiv

Senior career*
Years	Team	Apps	(Gls)
2008–2011	Maritsa Plovdiv	68	(59)
2011–2013	Spartak Plovdiv	43	(33)
2013–2014	Spartak Varna	11	(2)
2014–2015	Los Molinos	14	(10)
2015–2016	Atlético Sanluqueño	20	(11)
2016–2017	Panlefkadios	12	(5)
2017–2018	Hebar Pazardzhik	25	(16)
2018-2019	FC Vereya	10	(4)
- * Club domestic league appearances and goals

Stanimir Kirilov Dimitrov (Bulgarian: Станимир Кирилов Димитров) is a Bulgarian footballer who currently plays as a forward for FC Vereya.

Dimitrov started football at age 8 in his home town of Plovdiv, playing with local club Maritsa Plovdiv. At 16, he signed his first contract with Maritsa Plovdiv, scoring his first goal for the team in his debut match. He played also for Spartak Plovdiv, Spartak Varna, Los Molinos, Atlético Sanluqueño, Panlefkadios, Hebar Pazardzhik and Vereya Stara Zagora.
