= Great Keppel Island =

Island group in Queensland, Australia

Great Keppel Island Wop-pa (Woppaburra)
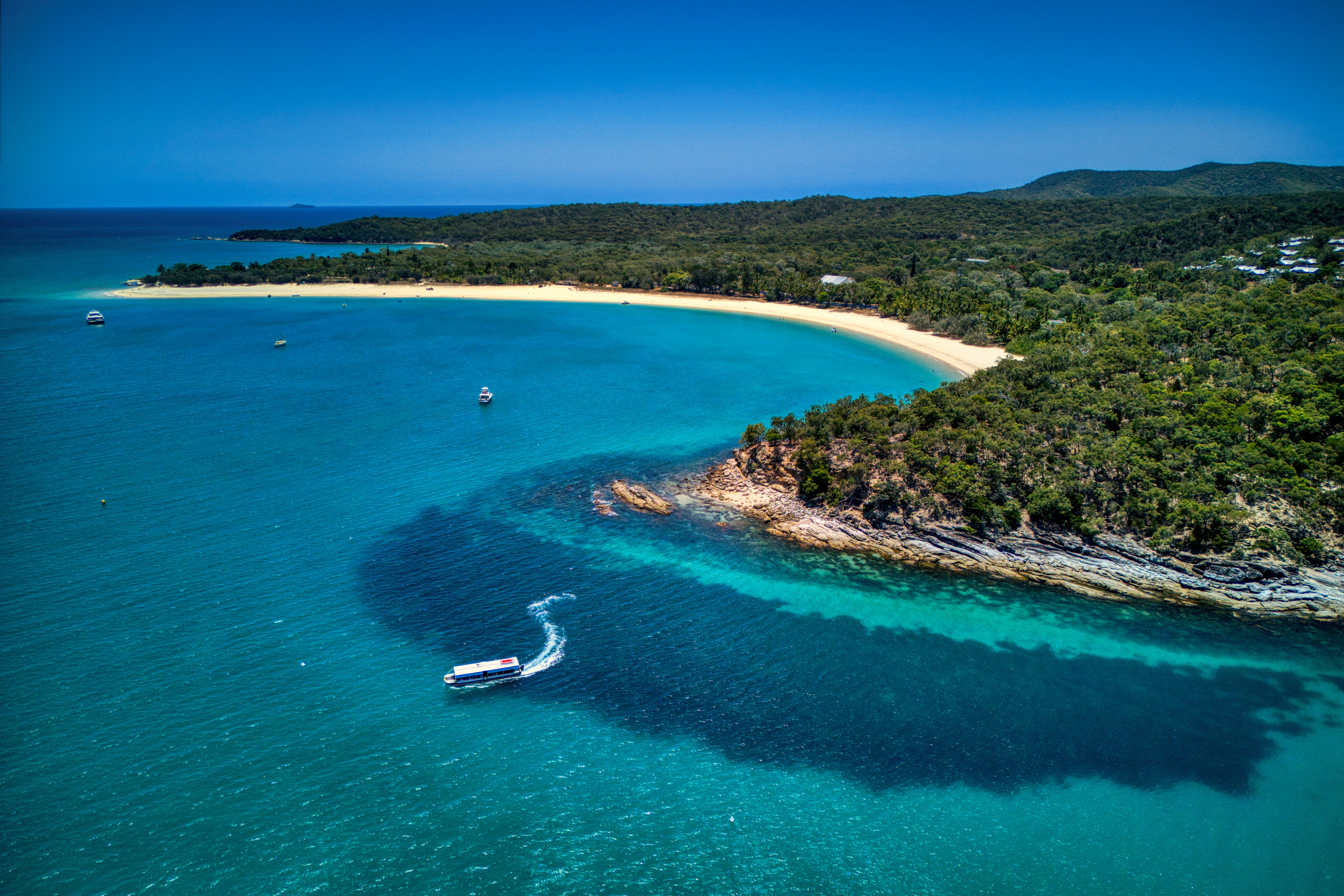
- Great Keppel Island, 2024

- Coordinates: 23.1761°S 150.9606°E
- Country: Australia
- State: Queensland
- LGA: Shire of Livingstone
- Location: 15 km (9.3 mi) from Yeppoon (W)

Government
  - State electorate: Keppel
  - Federal division: Capricornia
- Time zone: UTC+10
- Postcode: 4700

Great Keppel Island (Woppaburra: Wop-Pa) lies 15 kilometres (9.3 mi) off the coast from Yeppoon, in the locality of The Keppels in the Shire of Livingstone, Queensland, Australia. It is part of the Capricorn Coast of Central Queensland. The traditional owners of the island are the Woppaburra people. The largest of the eighteen islands in the Keppel Group, Wop-Pa covers an area of 1308 hectares.

The tropical climate and numerous beaches attract tourists from all points, and the island is visited by more than 50,000 people each year. A range of budget accommodation caters to tourists. There are 17 white-sand beaches and almost the greatest cover of hard coral reefs on the Great Barrier Reef. The coral diversity of the reefs matches that of the Whitsunday Islands and there is clear water most of the year around.

== Transport ==
The island is served by ferries and there is a small airport. Formerly, major airlines served the island, mostly with small Twin Otter aircraft suited to the short runway. However, since the closure of the resort, the small private airport is unattended and 24 hours advanced approval is required to land there.

== History ==
The islands were named by James Cook in April 1770 after the then First Lord of the Admiralty, Admiral Augustus Keppel.

Prior to European settlement, the island was home to an estimated 60–80 Woppaburra people, and centuries-old middens testify to the quantity of seafood found in the surrounding waters. It is believed that they occupied Wop-pa for around 10,000 years. The Woppaburra are recognised by the Australian Government as the traditional owners of the island. The first recorded visit to the island by Europeans was by naturalist John MacGillivray, aboard HMS Rattlesnake, in 1847. By the end of the 19th century, European settlers had killed or removed most of the indigenous population.

In 1866, Robert Ross obtained a lease over Great Keppel "from year to year and not exceeding five years", in partnership with C.E Beddome and Sir Arthur Palmer (Rowland, 2007), and so began the pastoral era on the islands. In 1882, the lease of Great Keppel drew interest and competition. Shaddock (1981) notes that the Lands Department held a public auction for 6 square miles (16 km^{2}), with the successful applicant being Robert Lyons of Rockhampton.

In its early European history, the island was used to raise sheep. William T. Wyndham, became the first permanent European inhabitant on Great Keppel, having been appointed by Lyons as stock-keeper. Wyndham developed good relationships with the Woppaburra and was just in his treatment of them. Wyndham had both the highest peak on the island and a cove on the east coast named in his honour. He left the island after witnessing the mistreatment of the Woppaburra people by the lessee, who forcibly removed 30 people following the killing of some sheep. The remaining people were forced to work for the lessee in squalid conditions and over the next 20 years their numbers dwindled until the final forced removed of the last 18 Woppaburra people in 1902.

The island was effectively vacant from 1903 to 1918. At that point, Michael and Lizzie O'Neill took over the grazing lease and ran sheep, also building a new homestead in the central part of the island. Michael O'Neill died in 1923 but Lizzie remained on the island, remarrying a young fisherman, Ralph Leeke in 1924. The homestead is now known as Leeke's Homestead and is listed on the Queensland Heritage Register. Leeke's Beach and Estuary are also named after Ralph and Lizzie. The marriage did not last and Ralph left the island but Lizzie remained, running the sheep by herself until the early 1940s.

After World War II, the island increasingly became a tourist destination. Prior to that, a local oysterman, James Morris, was in the habit of bringing fishing parties to the island, accommodating them in bush shelters. The first two huts were built at Fisherman's Beach in 1935 by his sons, Con and Cres. In 1957, Charles Tompson finished constructing a house and seven cabins at Fisherman's Beach, and so began the first rudimentary "resort". Ill health saw Tompson sell the buildings to Con, Cres, and Alan Morris, who called the resort "Silver Sands" and ran it until 1966.

It was then purchased by Graham Roberts and Tom Green who constructed a large building and the first swimming pool. Trans Australia Airlines (TAA) built an airstrip to serve the resort. In 1971, Roberts and Green sold to a Sydney-based consortium which also acquired the grazing lease, thus changing the future use of the island. TAA increased its interest in the resort, taking full ownership in 1975. The resort continued to expand over the next 15 years, eventually being able to accommodate 350 visitors and 130 staff. It became well known for the highly successful "Get Wrecked on Great Keppel" advertising campaign.

In 1992, Qantas took over TAA and the resort, selling it in March 1998 to Queensland businessmen Bevan Whittaker and Ron Hancock. Under their ownership the resort was operated firstly by Contiki and then by Mercure.

A further sale followed in 2006, with Sydney based developer Tower Holdings taking ownership. Tower only ran the resort for a short time before closing it in February 2008, announcing its plans for a major redevelopment involving a large hotel, hundreds of apartments and condominiums, a marina, a Greg Norman-designed golf course, and a larger airstrip, capable of landing small jet aircraft. After 12 years of ownership, the only major accomplishment of Tower Holdings was the completion of an Environmental Impact Study, which led to the approval of the redevelopment proposal by all three levels of government. Tower Holdings demolished a number of the old resort buildings in April 2018, but put the remains of the resort, and its leases, on the market in the middle of that year.

Historically and currently, the island is in the local government area of Shire of Livingstone, but between 2008 and 2013, it was in the Rockhampton Region, following a local government amalgamation that was subsequently reversed.

In April 2023, the Queensland Government cancelled the leases previously held by Tower Holdings, opening the way for future development.

== Heritage listings ==
Great Keppel Island has a number of heritage-listed sites, including:

- Leeke Homestead (23.1767°S 150.9564°E)

== Resorts ==
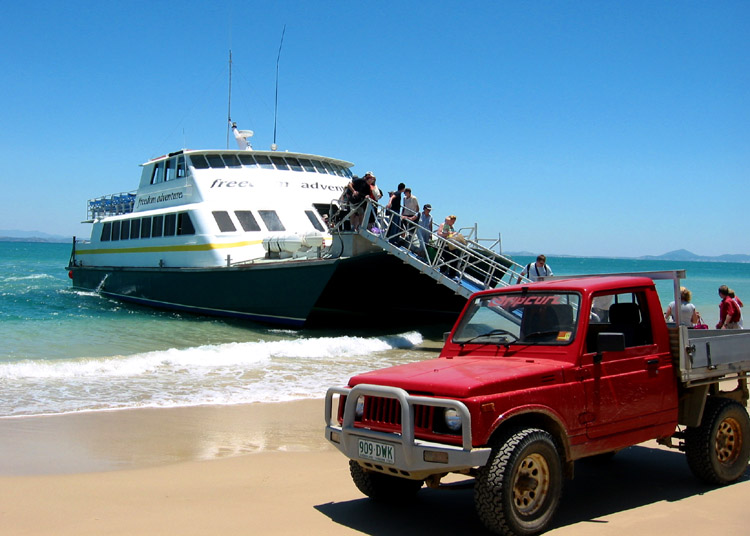
Ferry service from Yeppoon unloading passengers on the main beach, 2006.

The first resort on the island was operating by 1967, but none of them were high-rise. The resort is now closed but there is still accommodation on the island, ranging from tents to cabins, and a private beach house on the water's edge.

Ferries depart everyday to Great Keppel Island from Keppel Bay Marina and Pier One, Rosslyn Bay. A number of charters, full-day cruises, sailing adventures, and extended tour options are also available from Keppel Bay Marina.

From April 2002, Great Keppel Island boasted a resort owned by Contiki, which aimed to make it a "backpackers' island", and it became a popular destination for high school students during the school holidays. The most popular souvenir, mainly purchased by girls, was a T-shirt proclaiming "I got wrecked on Keppel Island". After Mercure took over the resort it was made more family friendly.

After purchasing the lease of the resort, and that of Lot 21, which covers 74% of the island, GKI Resort Pty Ltd, a subsidiary of the privately owned Australian company Tower Holdings, closed the facility in 2008. The company unveiled a $1.15 billion revitalisation plan for the island, which was declared a "significant project" by the Queensland Government. It included a 300-room resort hotel, 300 resort apartments, 1,700 villas, a 560-berth marina, a ferry terminal, a championship golf course, a yacht club, sporting ovals, childcare facilities, a chapel and a cultural centre. The plan included 1,300 acres (545 hectares) of environmental parkland on Lot 21, which was public land for recreation purposes, and had been recommended as a conservation park by the Department of Environment and Resource Management. Tower did not gain the support of the residents of Central Queensland or of the Environment Department, and the proposal was rejected by the Federal Environment Minister Peter Garrett in October 2009, on the grounds that there would be "unacceptable" impacts to the World Heritage Great Barrier Reef values of the island.

Unfazed by the objections, and despite several other Great Barrier Reef Island resorts closing, Tower Holdings submitted a third proposal early in 2010. The federal Tourism Minister, Martin Ferguson, announced his support for Agnew's proposal on 22 February 2012.

== Environment ==
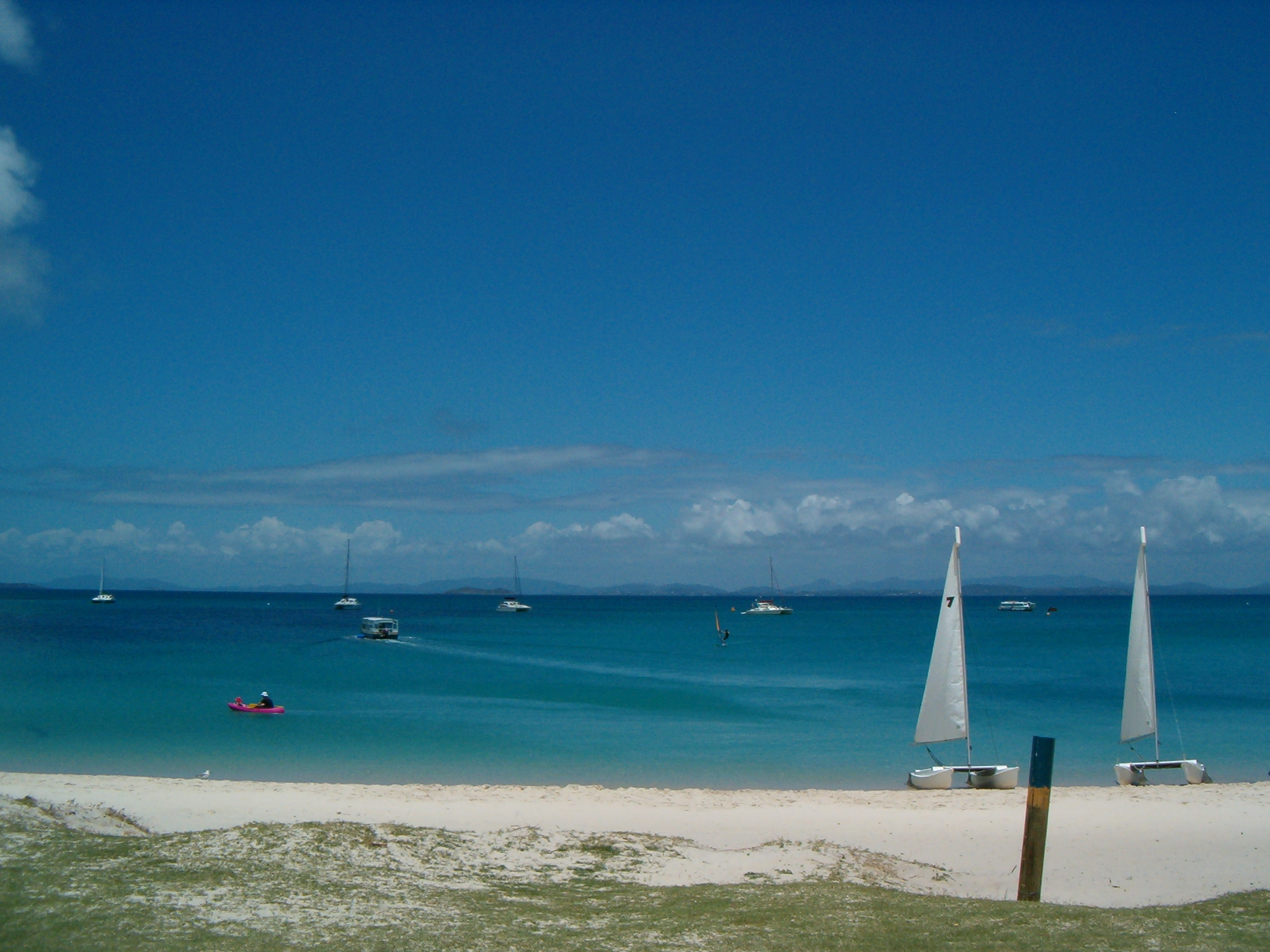
Great Keppel Island Beach, 2005

Great Keppel Island is part of the Great Barrier Reef Marine Park. The island is surrounded by 27 kilometres (17 mi) of beaches, as well as extensive coral reefs. The island is known for its fish diversity.

Swamp mahogany, a tree species with a limited topographical range, grows on the island.

== See also ==
- List of islands of Australia
