= Kiril Trayanov =

Bulgarian vert skater and skier (born 1977)

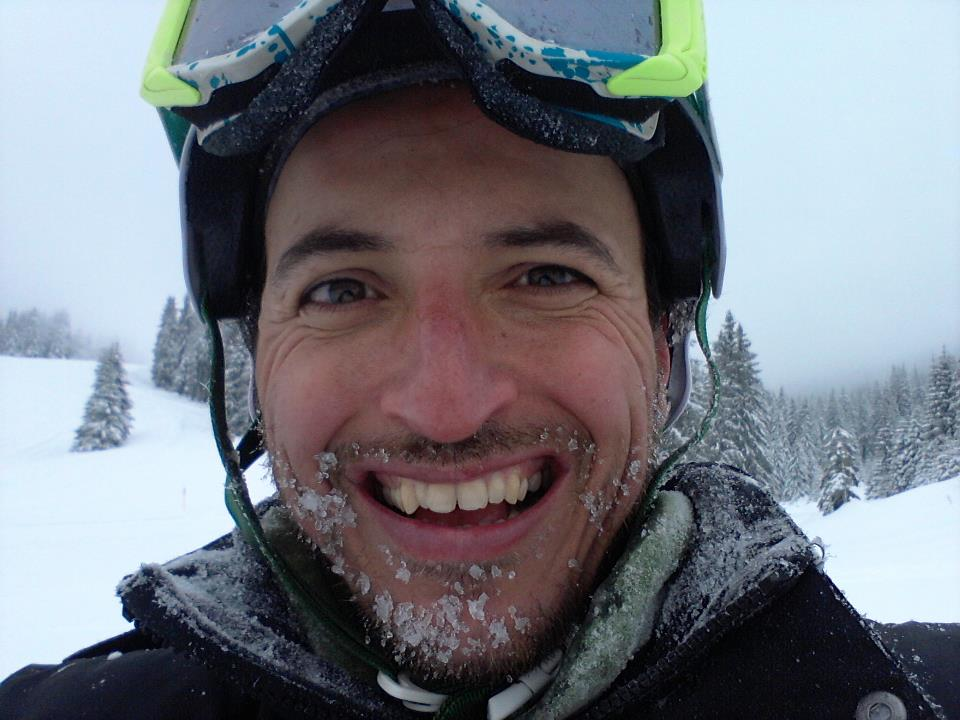

Personal information
- Nationality: Bulgarian
- Born: December 7, 1977 (age 48) Sofia, Bulgaria
- Occupation: Cartoon animation
- Weight: 165 lb (75 kg)
Medal record
Competitions
Representing Bulgaria
Bronze medal – third place	2016 BAUM Festival Barcelona	Vert
Bronze medal – third place	2016 Nass Music Festival UK Vert Challenge	Vert
Gold medal – first place	2015 Rome Italy	Vert
Silver medal – second place	2011 MONTANA SPRING SESSIONS	Vert
Silver medal – second place	2011 Barcelona Extreme	Vert
Gold medal – first place	2008 MONTANA SPRING SESSIONS	Vert
Silver medal – second place	2008 SNICKERS EUROPEAN CHAMPIONSHIPS	Vert
Silver medal – second place	2007 BTK Professional Inline Vert Comp	Vert
Bronze medal – third place	2007 European Inline Vert Challenge	Vert
Silver medal – second place	2006 European Inline Vert Championship	Vert
Silver medal – second place	2006 Open Inline Vert Contest	Vert
Silver medal – second place	2006 Rennes sur Roulettes	Vert
Silver medal – second place	2005 Slovenia Inline Vert	Vert
Gold medal – first place	2004 Bulgarian National Inline	Vert
Silver medal – second place	2004 Mountain Dew Vert Competition	Vert
Silver medal – second place	2003 Bulgarian National Inline Vert Championships	Vert
Silver medal – second place	2002 Bulgarian National Inline Vert Championships	Vert

Kiril Trayanov (Bulgarian: Кирил Траянов; born December 7, 1977, in Sofia) is a Bulgarian professional vert skater, and skier. Trayanov started skating when he was nine years old in 1986 and turned professional in 2006. Trayanov has won many competitions in his vert skating career; he is a member of Team DISASTER. In 2007 he was awarded for best trick Flatspin 900. Kiril Trayanov is also a cartoon animator and film editor.

Best tricks: Fakie 1080, Flatspin 900

His father was Antoni Trayanov.

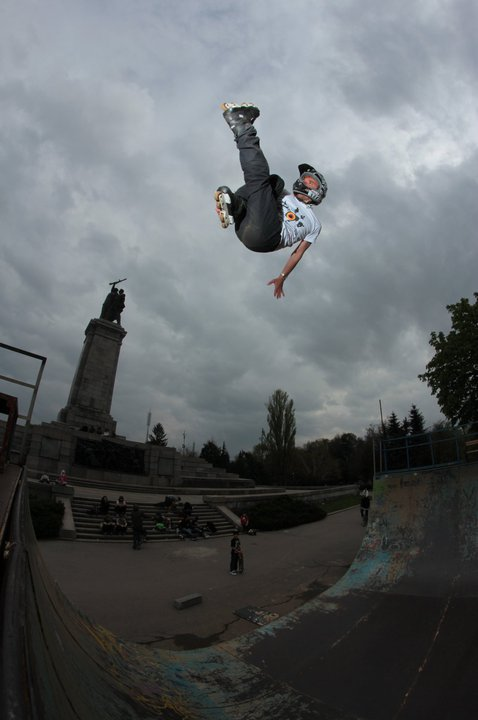
Liu Kang

== Vert competitions ==
- 2017 British Championship UK 4th
- 2016 BAUM Festival Barcelona 3rd
- 2016 Nass music Festival UK 3rd
- 2016 British Championship UK 6th
- 2015 European Championship Inline, Rome, Italy: 1st

2012

- European Championship Inline, Moscow, Russia: 5th
- European Championship Inline, Copenhagen, Denmark: 5th

2011

- Montana Spring Sessions, Montana, Bulgaria: 2nd
- Barcelona Extreme, Barcelona, Spain: 2nd
- European Cup, Moscow, Russia: 5th

2010

- Movistar Barcelona Extreme, Barcelona, Spain: 4th
- European Championship Inline 2nd round, Rotterdam, Denmark: 4th
- European Championship Inline 3rd round, Moscow, Russia: 9th
- European Championship Inline 5th round, Montana, Bulgaria: 5th
- European Cup, Berlin, Germany: 8th

2009

- Movistar Barcelona Extreme, Barcelona, Spain: 6th
- European Championship Inline Vert, Montana, Bulgaria: 8th
- European Championship Inline Vert Finals, Rotterdam, Denmark: 8th
- German Masters Inline Halfpipe, Berlin, Germany: 14th
- SAG European Challenge Halfpipe, Berlin, Germany: 12th

2008

- Montana Spring Sessions, Montana, Bulgaria: 1st
- Snickers European Championships, Montana, Bulgaria: 2nd

2007

- BTK Professional Inline Vert Comp, Montana, Bulgaria: 2nd
- European Inline Vert Challenge, Berlin, Germany: 3rd
- German Half-Pipe Masters, Berlin, Germany: 4th

2006

- Amateur Championships, Dallas, TX - Vert: 4th
- European Inline Vert Championship, Montana, Bulgaria - Vert: 2nd
- Open Inline Vert Contest, Montana, Bulgaria - Vert: 2nd
- Rennes sur Roulettes, Rennes, France - Vert: 2nd

2005

- SAG European Challenge, Berlin, Germany - Vert: 9th
- Razors German Masters Inline Vert Comp, Berlin, Germany: 4th
- Amateur World Championships, Manchester, UK - Vert: 8th
- Slovenia Inline Vert Competition, Nova Gorica - Vert: 2nd

2004

- Bulgarian National Inline Vert Championships - Vert: 1st
- Mountain Dew Vert Competition, Sofia, Bulgaria - Vert: 2nd

2003

- Bulgarian National Inline Vert Championships - Vert: 2nd

2002

- Bulgarian National Inline Vert Championships - Vert: 2nd

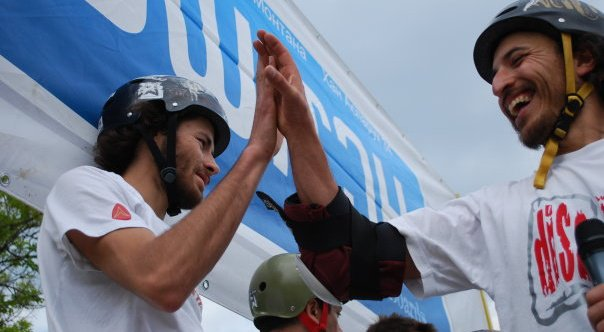
Kiro Trayanov and Niki Najdenov @ MSS

== Demonstrations ==
- Children Grow Up Without Violence 2012
- Varna Fun City Festival 2012
- Bulgaria Without Tobacco Smoke 2012
