= Dimitar Ralchev =

Bulgarian footballer

Personal information
- Date of birth: 27 April 1971 (age 55)
- Place of birth: Bulgaria

Dimitar Ralchev (Bulgarian: Димитър Ралчев) (born 27 April 1971) is a Bulgarian former footballer.

== Career ==
In his career, he represented Spartak Varna, Beroe and was also part of the Olympik Teteven team during their only season in the A PFG.
