= Alexandar Komanov =

Bulgarian karateka and mixed martial arts fighter

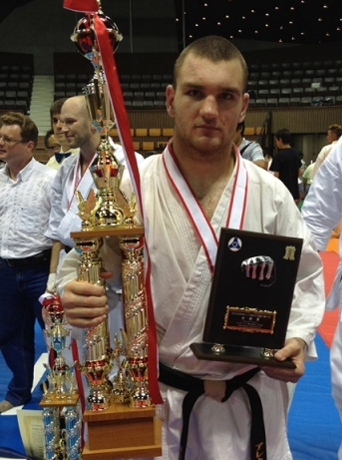
- Born: May 27, 1990 (age 36); Plovdiv, Bulgaria
- Native name: Александър Команов
- Nationality: Bulgarian
- Height: 1.76 m (5 ft 9 1/2 in)
- Weight: 84 kg (185 lb; 13.2 st)
- Division: Middleweight
- Team: Ronin
- Rank: 3rd dan black belt in Kyokushin
- Years active: 2011–present (MMA), 2001-present (Kyokushin)

Mixed martial arts record
- Total: 3
- Wins: 3
- By knockout: 3
- Losses: 0

Alexandar Komanov (Bulgarian: Александър Команов; born May 27, 1990) is a Bulgarian karateka and mixed martial artist who became the 2012 Kyokushin-kan Shinken Shobu Open Weight World Champion in Japan. In the final bout, Komanov defeated the Russian Kyokushin, Sergey Osipov. Komanov is a three-time World champion and a seven-time European champion.

The latest achievement of Komanov was at the first KWU (Kyokushin World Union) European championship which was held on June 3–4, 2016 in Belgrade, Serbia. Komanov defeated Artiom Semionov and won the golden medal (85 kg). He was also honored with the prestigious award for "Best Sporting Spirit".

Alexandar Komanov was awarded with the prize “Number one athlete of Plovdiv” for 2014.

== Mixed martial arts career ==
Komanov made his professional MMA debut on 29 October 2011 in a tournament Gala Night, held in Plovdiv, Bulgaria, under the promotion of WRKO MMA organization.

In the quarterfinal, Komanov defeated Stanimir Petrov (4–4 in MMA at the time of the bout) by KO in the second round.

In the semifinal, Komanov defeated Alexandar Georgiev (4–2 in MMA at the time of the bout) by KO in the first round.

In the final, Komanov defeated Emil Filimonov (2–0 in MMA at the time of the bout) by KO in the first round.

With all three KO victories, Komanov becomes the winner of the WRKO tournament. He was awarded with the WRKO belt by the President of the Bulgarian Boxing Federation Krasimir Ininski.

== Championships and accomplishments ==
- 2007 Kyokushinkai European Junior Championship - 1st place;
- 2008 Shinkyokushin - International Championship Memoarial Branko Boshniak - 3rd place;
- 2009 Kyokushinkai European Championship - 2nd place (80 kg);
- 2009 Kyokushinkai European Championship - 3rd place (open weight);
- 2010 European championship - 4th place (open category);
- 2010 International Championship, Spanish Cup - 1st place;
- 2010 Balkan International Championship - 1st place;
- 2011 Kyokushin-kan Austrian Cup Tournament - 1st place (80 kg);
- 2011 Kyokushin-Kan Karate Championship All Asia - 2nd place;
- 2011 Kyokushin-kan European Championship - 1st place (open weight);
- 2011 Karateka of the year;
- 2011 Kyokushin-kan All Japan - 2nd place;
- 2012 European championship - 2nd place;
- 2012 Kyokushin-kan Shinken Shobu World Championship - 1st place (open weight);
- 2012 Kyokushin-kan European championship - 3rd place;
- 2013 Kyokushin-kan All Japan - 1st place;
- 2013 World Championship - 2nd place;
- 2013 European championship - 1st place;
- 2014 European championship - 1st place;
- 2014 World Championship - 1st place;
- 2015 Kyokushin-kan European championship - 1st place;
- 2015 Kyokushin World Championship - 2nd place;
- 2016 Kyokushin European championship - 1st placе;
- 2017 Kyokushin World championship - 1st placе.

== Mixed martial arts record ==
Professional record breakdown
3 matches	3 wins	0 losses
By knockout	3	0
By submission	0	0
By decision	0	0

Res.	Record	Opponent	Method	Event	Date	Round	Time	Location	Notes
Win	3–0	(Bulgaria) Emil Filimonov	KO (punches)	WRKO Gala Night	Oct 29, 2011	1	3:23	Plovdiv, Bulgaria	Tournament final
Win	2–0	(Bulgaria) Alexandar Georgiev	KO (high kick)	WRKO Gala Night	Oct 29, 2011	1	2:17	Plovdiv, Bulgaria	Tournament semifinal
Win	1-0	(Bulgaria) Stanimir Petrov	KO (punch)	WRKO Gala Night	Oct 29, 2011	2	0:54	Plovdiv, Bulgaria	Tournament quarterfinal
