= Radostin =

Radostin (feminine: Radostina) is a Bulgarian given name. Notable people with the name include:

== Radostin ==
- Radostin Kishishev (born 1974), Bulgarian footballer
- Radostin Stanev (born 1975), Bulgarian footballer
- Radostin Stoychev (born 1969), Bulgarian volleyball player and coach
- Radostin Vasilev (born 1985), Bulgarian politician

== Radostina ==
- Radostina Chitigoi (born 1978), Bulgarian volleyball player
- Radostina Marinova (born 1998), Bulgarian volleyball player
- Radostina Todorova (born 1995), Bulgarian model and beauty pageant titleholder
- Radostina Vasekova (born 1950), Bulgarian shot putter
