= Pavel Mitrenga =

Vert Skater

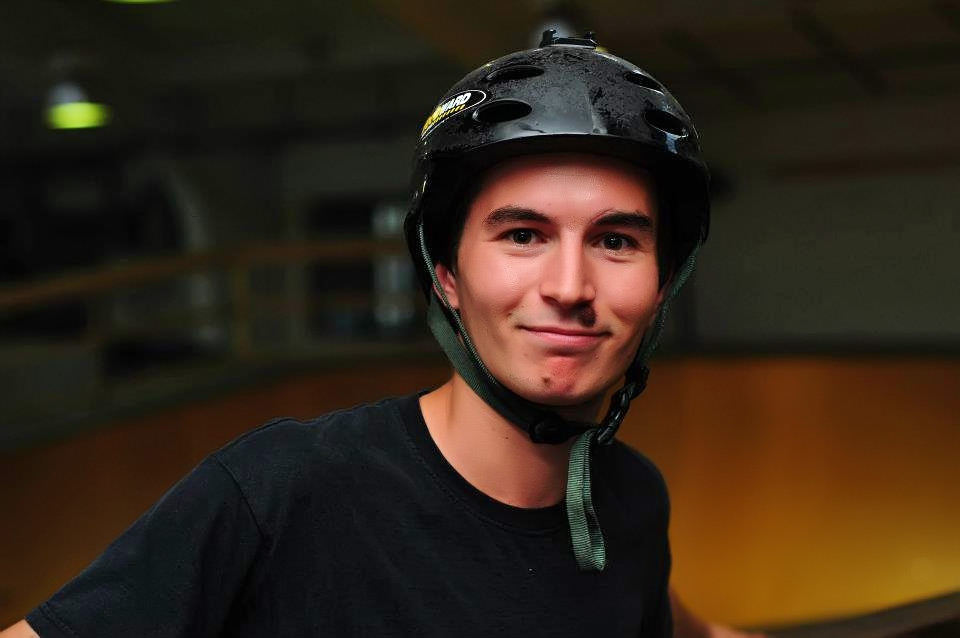

Personal information
- Nationality: Bulgarian
- Born: September 6, 1986 (age 39) Sofia, Bulgaria

Sport
- Sport: Vert skating
Medal record
Competitions
Representing Bulgaria
Silver medal – second place	2012 Birmingham, UK	Vert
Bronze medal – third place	2011 Moscow, Russia	Vert
Gold medal – first place	2011 Barcelona, Spain	Vert
Silver medal – second place	2008 Berlin, Germany	Vert
Gold medal – first place	2007 Tehachapi, CA, USA	Vert

Pavel Mitrenga (Bulgarian: Павел Митренга) is a Bulgarian professional vert skater. Mitrenga turned professional in 2007 with a gold medal in Tehachapi California.

Best Tricks Flatspin 900, McTwist 720

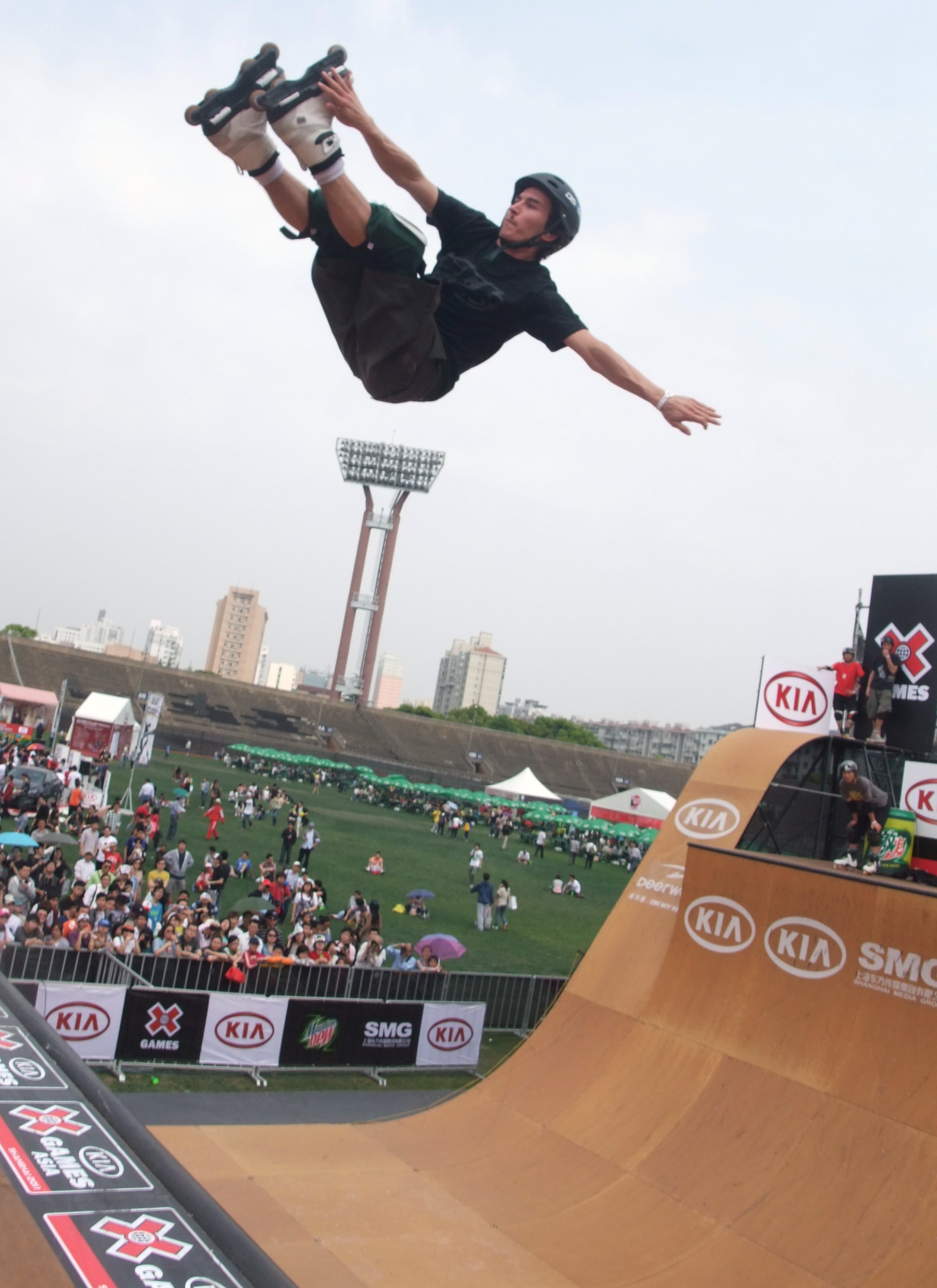
Pavel Vert Skating

== Vert Competitions ==
- 2019 - Grap Contest, Rome, Italy, 1st place
- 2018 - Taunton Blade Bash, Taunton, United Kingdom, 1st place
- 2017 - British Inline Championships, Corby, United Kingdom, 3rd place
- 2016 - European Inline Vert Championships, Hertogenbosch, Nederlands, Finals, 2nd place
- 2016 - European Inline Vert Championships, Modena, Italy, 3rd place
- 2016 - European Inline Vert Championships, Barcelona, Spain, 2nd place
- 2016 - UHL, Las Vegas, USA, 3rd place
- 2016 - British Inline Championships, Corby, United Kingdom, 4th place
- 2015 - European Inline Vert Championships Finals, Barcelona, Spain, 2nd place
- 2015 - Bunker Contest, Rome, Italy, 3rd place
- 2014 - European Inline Vert Championships Finals, Barcelona, Spain, 4th place
- 2014 - European Inline Vert Championship, San Marino, San Marino, 3rd place
- 2013 - European Inline Vert Championship, San Marino, San Marino, 2nd place
- 2012 - European Inline Vert Championships, Copenhagen, Denmark, 4th place
- 2012 – Chewits Xtreme-, Birmingham United Kingdom, 2nd place
- 2012 – KIA Asian X games, Shanghai, China, 6th place
- 2011 – European Inline Vert Championships Finals, Moscow, Russia 3rd place
- 2011 – LKXA Barcelona Extreme, Best trick, Barcelona, Spain, 1st place
- 2011 – LKXA Barcelona Extreme, Highest Air, European Inline Vert Championships Finals, 1st place
- 2011 – KIA Asian X games, Shanghai, China, 9th place
- 2010 – Montana Spring Sessions III, Montana, Bulgaria, 2nd place
- 2009 – European Challenge, Berlin, Germany, 5th place
- 2009 – Montana Spring Sessions II, Montana, Bulgaria, 1st place
- 2008 – European Challenge, Berlin, Germany, 2nd place
- 2008 – Montana Spring Sessions I, Montana, Bulgaria, 2nd place
- 2007 – European Challenge, Berlin, Germany, 4th place
- 2007 – American Inline League- World Championship Finals, Tehachapi, California, USA– 1st place
- 2007 - BTC European Inline Vert Championship, Montana, Bulgaria, 2nd place
- 2006 – LG Action Sports Finals in Amateur Finals, Dallas (Texas), USA, - 7th Place
- 2006 - VIVATEL European Inline Vert Championships, Montana, Bulgaria, 3rd place
- 2006 - Rennes Sur Roulettes, Rennes, France, 7th place
- 2005 - Nova Gorica Inline Vert Competition, Nova Gorica, Slovenia, 4th place
