= Samir Seliminski =

Bulgarian footballer

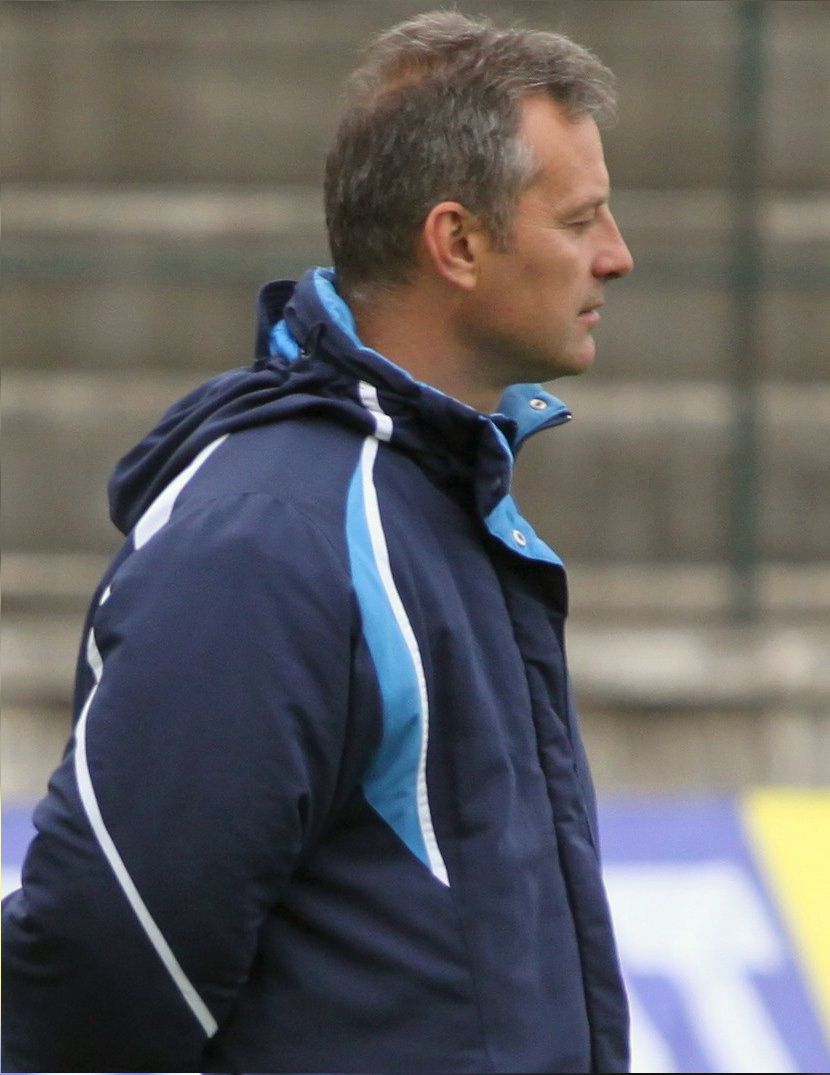
Selimiski in 2011

Samir Seliminski (born 9 May 1969, in Isperih) is a Bulgarian former football player and was the football manager of Akademik Sofia.

== Career ==
=== As player ===
Born in Isperih, Seliminski played in his career for small amateur sides F.C. Han Asparuh and Levski Glavinitsa.

=== As coach ===
On 9 September 2009, Seliminski was presented as a new head coach of Akademik Sofia. By the end of the season, Seliminski had guided Akademik to promotion to the A PFG, for the first time in 28 years.

He was also a coach for Shreveport United Soccer Club, in Shreveport, Louisiana.(2014–2018)
