= The Rough Guide to Cajun & Zydeco (1998 album) =

Compilation album by Various artists
- Released: 5 May 1998
- Genre: World, Cajun, Zydeco
- Length: 65:18
- Label: World Music Network

Full series chronology
The Rough Guide to World Roots (1999)	The Rough Guide to Cajun & Zydeco (1998)	The Rough Guide to Native American Music (1998)

The Rough Guide to Cajun & Zydeco is a compilation album originally released in 1998. Part of the World Music Network Rough Guides series, the album features the cajun and zydeco genres of Louisiana in roughly equal measures. Phil Stanton, co-founder of the World Music Network, compiled and produced the album. This was the first of two similarly named compilations: the second edition was released in 2011.

== Critical reception ==
Professional ratings
Review scores
Source	Rating
Allmusic	3/5 stars

The album received generally positive reviews. Writing for AllMusic, Adam Greenberg lamented the exclusion of Boozoo Chavis and Beau Jocque, but still called it "enjoyable in the right ways". Michaelangelo Matos of the Chicago Reader claimed the release almost "converted" him to the genres, comparing it with Disc 3 of Harry Smith's Anthology of American Folk Music.

== Track listing ==
No.	Title	Artist	Length
1.	"One Step at a Time"	Clifton Chenier	4:22
2.	"Zydeco Boogaloo"	Buckwheat Zydeco	3:53
3.	"Balfa Waltz"	David Doucet	3:47
4.	"La 'Tit Cord (The Little String)"	Jimmy C. Newman	2:11
5.	"La Misère M'a Fait Brailler"	John Delafose & The Eunice Playboys	4:32
6.	"Rolling Pin"	BeauSoleil	3:53
7.	"Grande Bosco"	Eddie LeJeune	2:44
8.	"Bayou Pon Pon"	Michael Doucet	2:59
9.	"Two Step d'Amédé"	Savoy-Doucet Cajun Band	2:41
10.	"Disco et Fais Do-Do"	Bruce Daigrepont	3:21
11.	"Kolinda"	BeauSoleil	3:37
12.	"Slow Horses and Fast Women"	Nathan & the Zydeco Cha Chas	4:16
13.	"La Pointe aux Pins"	Steve Riley & the Mamou Playboys	3:35
14.	"Fiddle Stomp"	Wallace Cheese Read	2:21
15.	"Jolie, Petite Blonde"	Nathan Abshire	2:30
16.	"Chico Two-Step"	The California Cajun Orchestra	2:45
17.	"J'Etais au Bal"	Jo-El Sonnier	3:20
18.	"Let the Good Times Roll"	Buckwheat Zydeco	4:57
19.	"I Passed in Front of Your Door"	D.L. Menard	3:34
