= Stelian Trasborg =

Bulgarian footballer

Stelian Mladenov Kamburov Trasborg (born 21 July 1989 in Denmark) is a Bulgarian footballer, who is currently contracted with HIK in the Danish 2nd Division.

== Career ==
Trasborg began his career with Greve IF and signed 2006 for Danish 1st Division club Lyngby BK. In July 2010 left Lyngby Boldklub and signed a three years contract with Elite 3000 Helsingør.

== International career ==
He was born in Denmark and has played youth internationals for the Bulgaria national under-19 football team.
