= Radostín (Havlíčkův Brod District) =

- Municipality
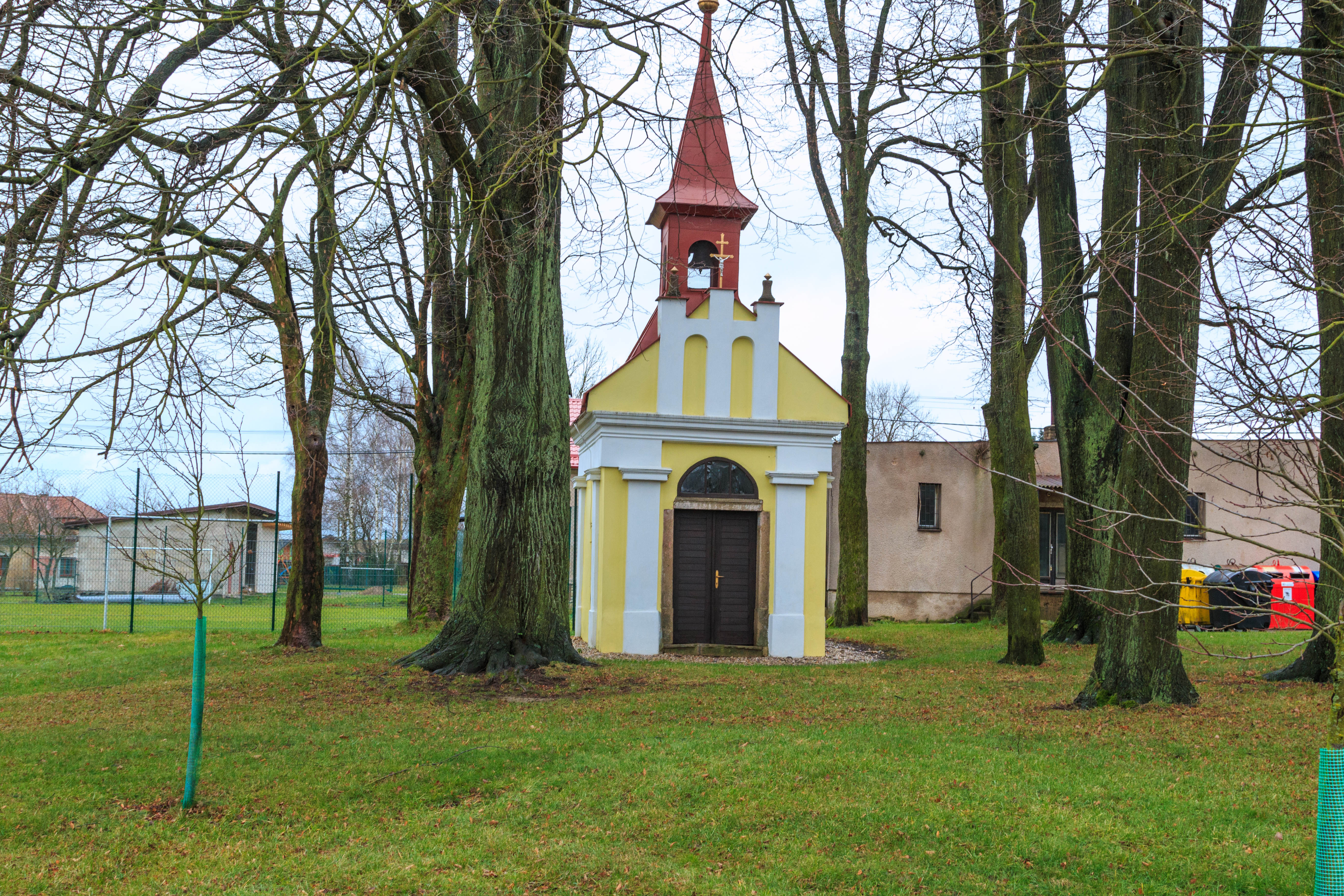
- Chapel in the centre of Radostín

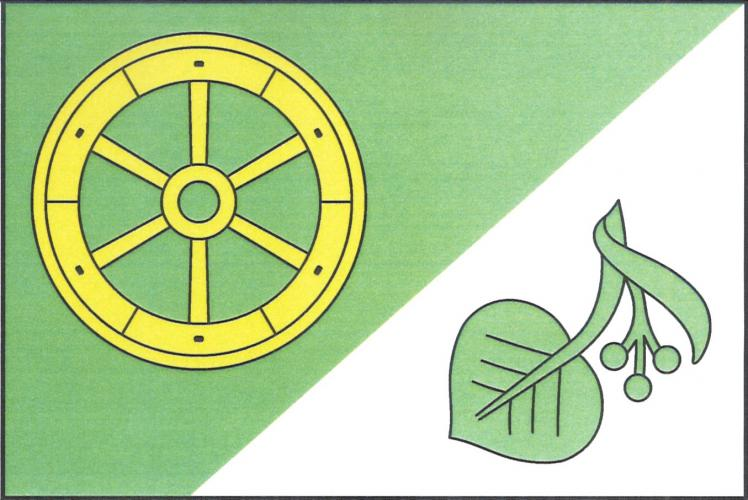
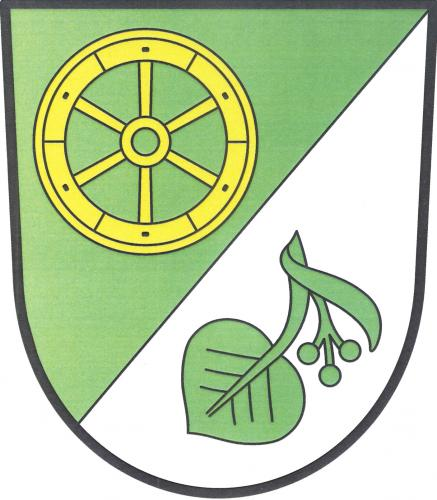
- Flag Coat of arms

- Location in the Czech Republic
- Coordinates: 49°36′38″N 15°44′7″E
- Country: Czech Republic
- Region: Vysočina
- District: Havlíčkův Brod
- First mentioned: 1590

Area
  - Total: 4.33 km^{2} (1.67 sq mi)
- Elevation: 550 m (1,800 ft)

Population (2026-01-01)
  - Total: 144
  - Density: 33.3/km^{2} (86.1/sq mi)
- Time zone: UTC+1 (CET)
  - Summer (DST): UTC+2 (CEST)
- Postal code: 580 01
- Website: www.obecradostin.cz

Radostín is a municipality and village in Havlíčkův Brod District in the Vysočina Region of the Czech Republic. It has about 100 inhabitants.

Radostín lies approximately 7 kilometres (4 mi) north-west of Havlíčkův Brod, 30 km (19 mi) north of Jihlava, and 94 km (58 mi) south-east of Prague.

== Demographics ==
Historical population
Year	Pop.	±%
1869	157	—
1880	165	+5.1%
1890	154	−6.7%
1900	185	+20.1%
1910	168	−9.2%
1921	181	+7.7%
1930	238	+31.5%
1950	199	−16.4%
1961	215	+8.0%
1970	192	−10.7%
1980	179	−6.8%
1991	158	−11.7%
2001	152	−3.8%
2011	142	−6.6%
2021	159	+12.0%
Source: Censuses
