= Ivo Papazov =

Bulgarian musician

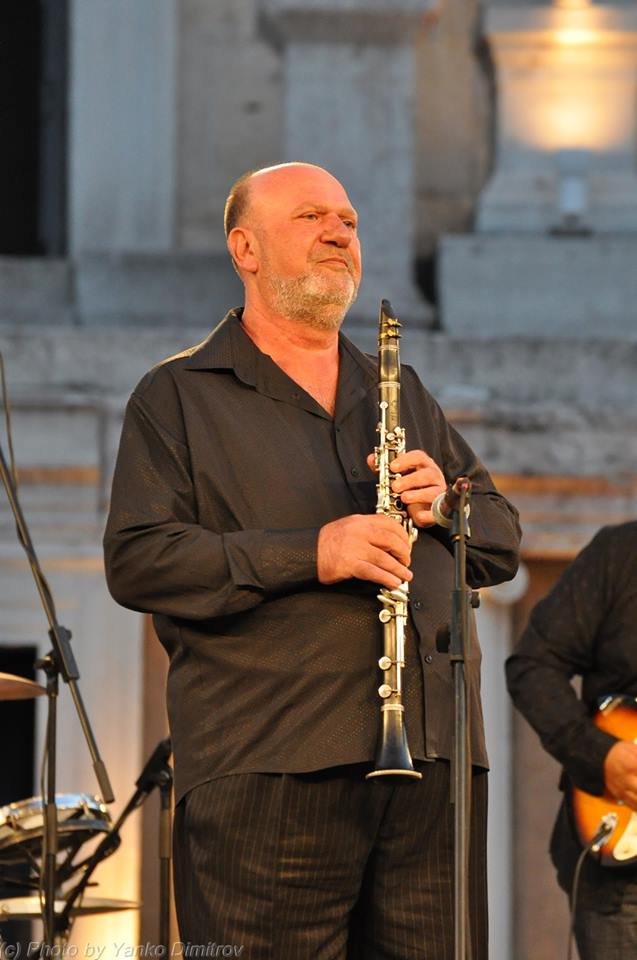
- Born: Ibryam Papazov; February 16, 1952 (age 74); Kardzhali, Bulgaria
- Occupation: musician

Ivo Papazov (or Papasov; Bulgarian: Иво Папазов; born 16 February, 1952), nicknamed Ibryama (Ибряма), is a Bulgarian clarinetist. He leads the "Ivo Papazov Wedding Band" in performances of jazz-infused Stambolovo music, and is one of the premier creators of the genre known as "wedding band" music in Bulgaria, along with the violinist Georgi Yanev, saxophonist Yuri Yunakov, clarinetist Neshko Neshev and accordionists Ivan Milev and Peter Ralchev. Together with Emilia they are known as Mames 2001. An orchestra that had great success in the TV show Познай кой е под масата ("Guess who is under the table").

According to Garth Cartwright, he was "the first Balkan Gypsy musician to win a wide international following with his two Joe Boyd-produced albums for Hannibal Records in the early 1990s." Papazov and his Wedding Band have toured the United States several times.

Papazov and Yuri Yunakov are briefly profiled and the recording of "Kurdzhaliiska Ruchenica" from their 2005 album Together Again is analyzed in the popular textbook, Worlds of Music, 5th Edition.

== Early life ==
Ivo Papazov is a Bulgarian Roma and his original name is Ibrahim (Turkish name). Papazov has stated: "I am one of the few light skinned people in my family but I know I am Romani." As a result of the extensive programme of forced nationalisation of ethnic minority groups during Bulgaria's socialist rule, in the 1980s, Papazov changed his first name to Ivo (adapted from Ibo, short for Ibrahim). He speaks Turkish and comes from Kardzhali, a city close to Bulgaria’s Turkish and Greek borders.

== Career ==
Papazov grew up in a musical family and began playing music at the age of 12. He followed the Balkan Romani tradition of leaving school at the age of 16, in his case to focus on playing music for a living. He began performing with a band of his own in 1974, at the age of 22.

In 1982, due to Papazov's origins and popularity among the Turkish population in Bulgaria, he was arrested, beaten and held in custody. Once the People's Republic of Bulgaria fell in 1990, Papazov could focus on the rest of the world which led to collaborations with musicians like Hector Zazou.

Papazov returned from a hiatus in 2001, working on an album titled Fairgrounds, which was released in 2003.

In 2005, Papazov won the Audience Award from the BBC's Radio3 World Music Awards.

In February 2009, Papazov and his trio took part in the opening gala of the Year of Bulgaria in Russia at the new hall of the Bolshoi Theatre in Moscow, appearing alongside the Sofia Philharmonic Orchestra conducted by Nayden Todorov.

== Selected discography ==
- Ivo Papasov and His Bulgarian Wedding Band - Orpheus Ascending (Hannibal, 1989)
- Ivo Papasov - Fairground (Kuker, 2003)

Contributing artist

- The Rough Guide to the Music of Eastern Europe (World Music Network, 1999)
