= Yonko Nedelchev =

Bulgarian footballer

Personal information
- Full name: Yonko Nedelchev Yovchev
- Date of birth: 6 July 1974 (age 52)
- Place of birth: Bulgaria
- Position: Defender

Youth career
- Rozova Dolina Kazanlak

Senior career*
Years	Team	Apps	(Gls)
1993–1994	Rozova Dolina Kazanlak	12	(1)
1994–1996	Spartak Plovdiv	52	(5)
1996–1997	Levski Sofia	3	(0)
1997–1998	Etar Veliko Tarnovo	23	(1)
1998	Loko Plovdiv	3	(0)
1998–1999	Olympik Sliven	21	(0)
1999–2000	Beroe	24	(1)
2000–2002	Sokol Markovo	54	(7)
2002–2004	Botev Plovdiv	32	(1)
2004–2005	Hebar Pazardzhik	6	(0)
2005	Chepinets Velingrad	14	(1)
2006–2007	Spartak Plovdiv	26	(1)

International career
	Bulgaria U21	12	(0)
- * Club domestic league appearances and goals

Yonko Nedelchev (Bulgarian: Йонко Неделчев) (born 6 July 1974) is a Bulgarian former footballer who played as a defender.

== Career ==
Coming through the youth ranks of Rozova Dolina in Kazanlak, Nedelchev spent his entire career in his country, reaching a Bulgarian Cup final with Levski Sofia in 1997. He is a former member of the Bulgaria U21 team. Nedelchev is known as a passionate player and is popular with Botev Plovdiv supporters.
