= Genko Papazov =

Bulgarian footballer

Personal information
- Date of birth: 21 January 1972 (age 54)
- Place of birth: Bulgaria

Genko Papazov (Bulgarian: Генко Папазов) (born 21 January 1972) is a former Bulgarian footballer who played for FC Chirpan and Metalurg Pernik.
