= Boris Papazov =

Bulgarian footballer

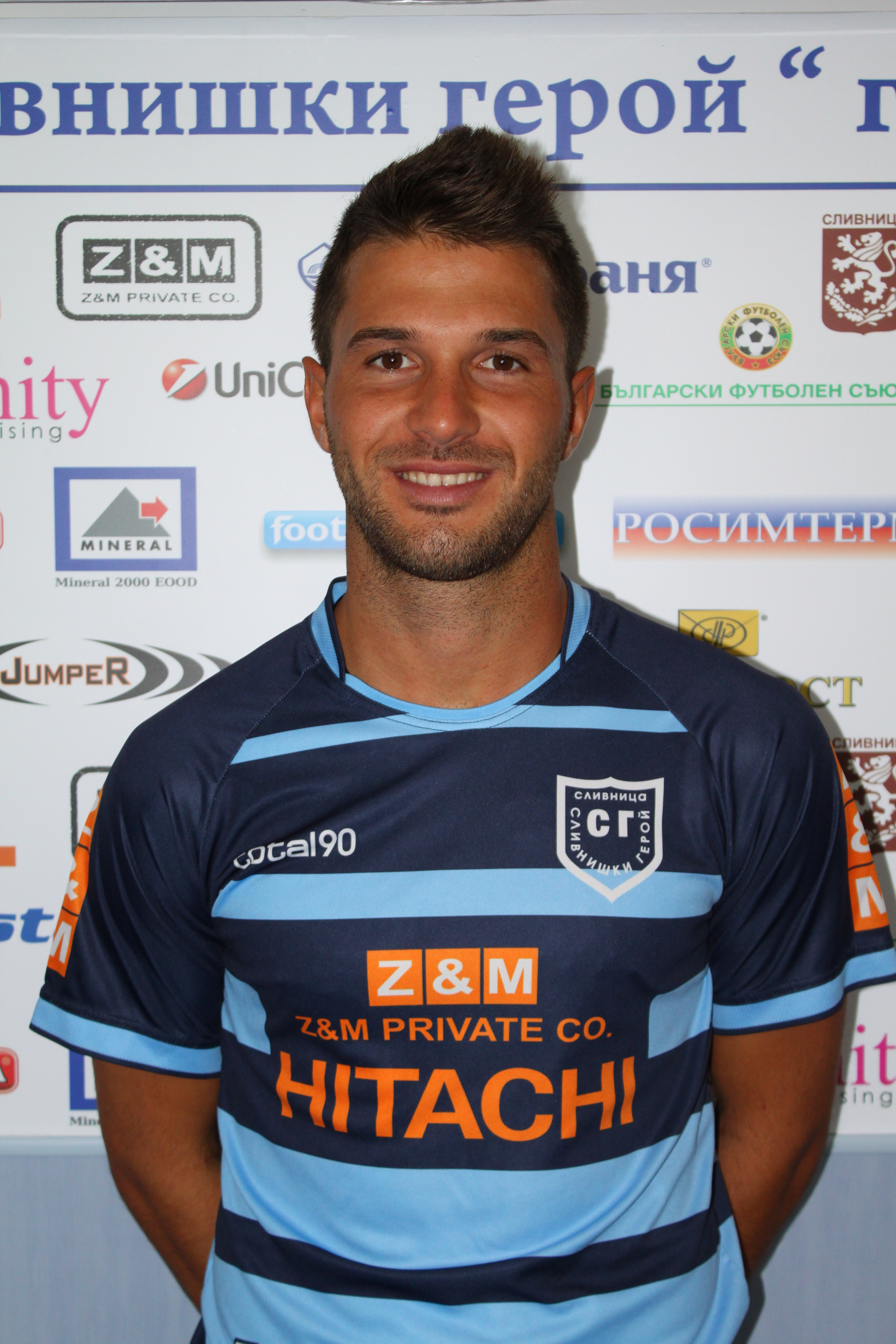

Personal information
- Full name: Boris Marinov Papazov
- Date of birth: 17 May 1989 (age 37)
- Place of birth: Sofia, Bulgaria
- Height: 1.78 m (5 ft 10 in)
- Position: Winger

Youth career
- FC Septemvri Sofia
- LASK Linz
- Litex

Senior career*
Years	Team	Apps	(Gls)
2008–2010	FC Wels		
2009–2010	PFC Botev Krivodol		
2010–2012	PFC Akademik Sofia		
2012	FC Slivnishki Geroy	5	(1)

International career
2005–2007	Bulgaria U18		
- * Club domestic league appearances and goals

Boris Marinov Papazov is a Bulgarian footballer, an attacking midfielder, a former junior national of Bulgaria, the player of FC Slivnishki Geroy.

== Football career ==
Born in Sofia, began his career in club in Septevri Sofia, studying and sports the 57th school in the district "Krasna Polyana". At age 12 he moved to Austria, where he became part of the school of the famous LASK Linz.

In 2006, he returned to Bulgaria, joined the team of PFC Litex Lovech. Thanks to the good games Papazov an integral part of adolescent national team, and a little more than a year later passes into youth development program of PFC Levski Sofia, playing for the juniors-seniors on the team.

In 2007 a sensational went to Spain, where he joined the team Getafe CF, playing for the U-19 club. Remained there for two years, and then moved into the ranks of FC Wels Austria, where he played with another Bulgarian – Milan Koprivarov.

He returned to Bulgaria, and in 2009 passed sample with multiple Czech champion AC Sparta Prague, but no agreement can be reached.

In 2011 signed with the PFC Academic Sofia, which participates in the Western "B" Football Group. In the summer of 2012 began training with F.C. Slivnishki geroi hero as the team's filing in August the same year.

His debut for the club on 2 September 2012 in a match against native Sf September, marking the third goal of the match to end 4–0.
