= Georgi Gradev =

Bulgarian footballer and sports agent

- Born: 27 December 1975 (age 50); Sofia, Bulgaria
- Occupations: Footballer; Football agent; sports lawyer
- Organisation: SILA International Lawyers
Association football career
- Position: Goalkeeper
Youth career
- Levski Sofia
Senior career*
Years	Team	Apps	(Gls)
- Spartak Varna
- * Club domestic league appearances and goals
- Website: silalawyers.com

Georgi Gradev (Bulgarian: Георги Градев) (born 27 December 1975) is a former amateur Bulgarian footballer who worked as a football agent between 2004 and 2009 and as a sports lawyer since 2006, though according to official reports he does not possess any law degree and does not have any authority to practice law in Bulgaria.

== Biography ==
Gradev was born in Sofia, but grew up in Morocco, where his father was previously employed. He started his playing career with the youth team of Levski Sofia.

He graduated from the University of Pittsburgh (USA) and Birkbeck, University of London (UK), where he studied international sports law and graduated with distinction, though several sources claim that he never managed to graduate and therefore he is not a graduated lawyer. Gradev is a founding partner of SILA International Lawyers, a law firm specializing in sports law. He has participated in more than 600 sports cases from 2006 to 2023. From 2017 to 2022, he was a professor at the ISDE Madrid, where he gave lectures in the master's program for international sports law. Gradev is a member of the editorial board of the football law magazine Football Legal. He is a member of the FIDE-appointed Provisional Committee temporarily running the Bulgarian Chess Federation, where he became European champion with the women's chess team in Budva, Montenegro, in November 2023.

Gradev has represented many Bulgarian footballers, while also often being critical of the Bulgarian Football Union's decisions.

After being part of Berbatov's team running for the presidency of the Bulgarian Football Union, he was released from his duties and presented his own candidacy receiving only 6 votes out of almost 800 voting clubs.
