= Life on Mars (disambiguation) =

Life on Mars refers to the scientific investigation on the possibility of microbial life (past or present) on the planet Mars.

Life on Mars may also refer to:

== Film and TV ==
- Life on Mars (British TV series), a British television drama
  - Life on Mars (American TV series), an American remake of the British television drama
  - Life on Mars (South Korean TV series), a Korean remake of the British television drama
  - La chica de ayer (TV series), a Spanish remake of the British television drama
  - The Dark Side of the Moon (TV series), a Russian remake of the British television drama
  - Svět pod hlavou, a Czech remake of the British television drama
- "Life on Mars" (The West Wing), an episode of The West Wing

== Music ==
- "Life on Mars?", a 1971 song by David Bowie from Hunky Dory
- "Life on Mars", a song by Astral Projection from Dancing Galaxy
- Life on Mars, an album by Dexter Wansel or the title track
- Life on Mars, an album by The Veronicas

== Other uses ==
- Life on Mars (poetry collection), a 2011 book by Tracy K. Smith
- Lego Life on Mars, a LEGO set brick collection from 2001

== See also ==
- Live from Mars, a 2001 live album by Ben Harper & the Innocent Criminals
- Martian, a hypothetical or fictional inhabitant of Mars
- Colonization of Mars
