= Cesar Benito =

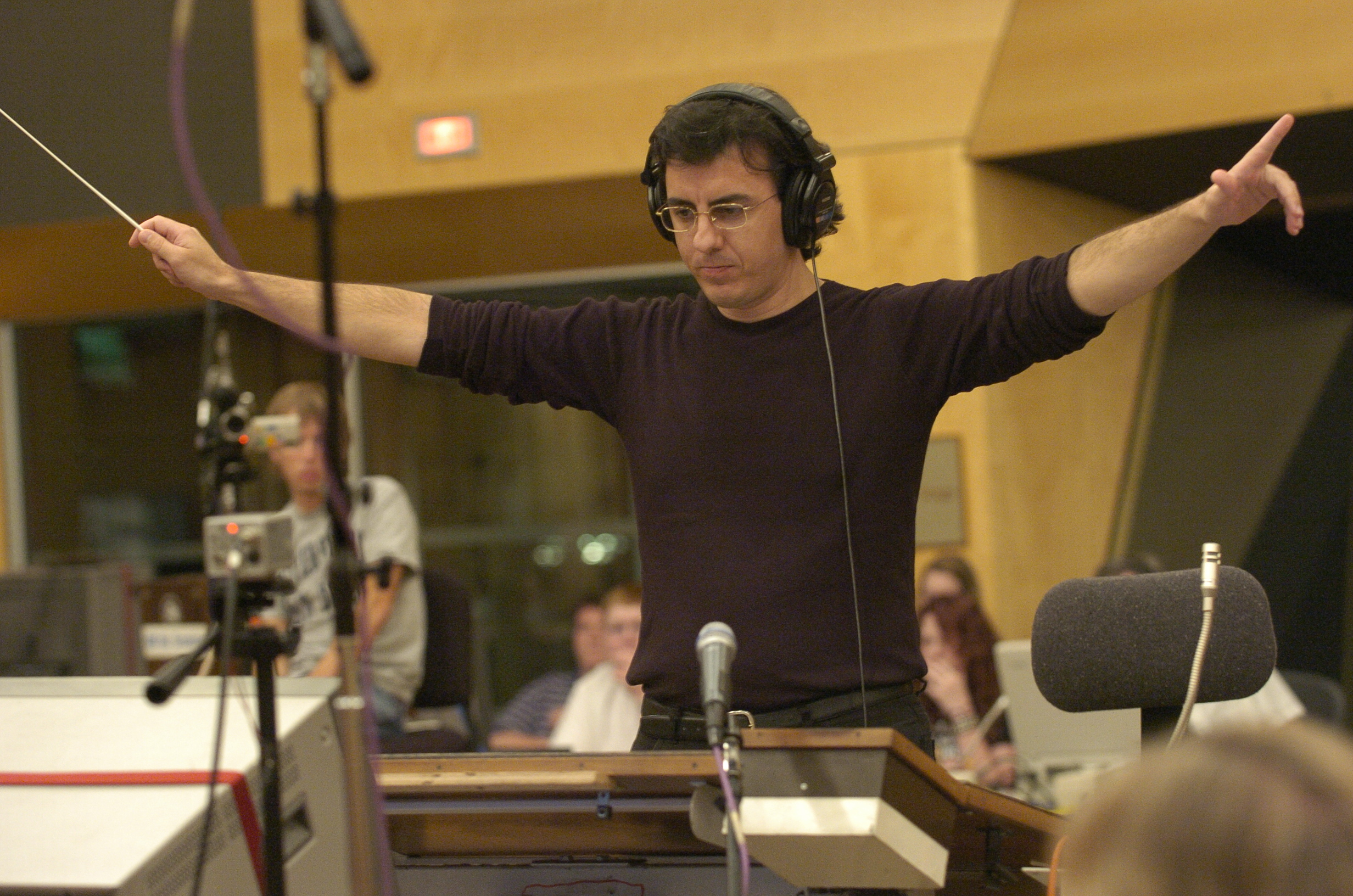

Background information
- Genres: Film score, Film music, Pop rock, Musical theatre
- Occupations: Composer, Songwriter, Conductor, Performer, Producer
- Instruments: Piano, guitar, ukulele
- Website: cesarbenito.com

César Benito Fernández is a composer, orchestrator, conductor and music producer from Marbella, Spain. He is widely recognized for his exceptional work in composing the music scores for some of Spain's most highly acclaimed and commercially successful TV series in recent years. These include La chica de ayer (the Spanish remake of BBC's Life on Mars), Los Protegidos and the internationally renowned hit The Time in Between (El Tiempo Entre Costuras), a period drama that shattered a twelve-year-old record in 2013 by achieving the highest ratings for the premiere of a prime time TV series in Spain. Furthermore, Benito's composition for the comedy series Allí abajo, also contributed to breaking the record once again in 2015, and making it the number one prime time TV series in Spain for three consecutive years.

The soundtrack album for El Tiempo Entre Costuras achieved remarkable success, reaching #1 on the iTunes Soundtrack Albums chart in Spain and #2 in the General category. This exceptional achievement was further enhanced by receiving numerous prestigious awards, notably the esteemed Iris Award for Best Music for Television, bestowed by the Academy of Sciences and Arts of Television in Spain. Additionally, during the 2016 Summer Olympics in Rio de Janeiro, rhythmic gymnast Carolina Rodríguez captivated the audience with her ribbon routine, accompanied by Cesar Benito's music from the "El Tiempo Entre Costuras" score, which led to her earning an Olympic Diploma.

Benito pursued his musical education with dedication, studying piano, music theory, and composition at the Conservatorio Superior de Malaga in Spain, where he graduated with honors. In addition to his classical training, he expanded his knowledge by studying jazz arranging and composition in Madrid. Driven by his passion for music, he embarked on a transformative journey and moved to Boston to enroll at the esteemed Berklee College of Music. There, he excelled academically, graduating magna cum laude with a dual B.A. in Film Scoring and Contemporary Writing & Production. His remarkable talent and commitment earned him the prestigious Arif Mardin Award, recognizing his excellence in Music Production & Arranging.

== Work ==
=== Film and television ===
| Year | Title | Format | Genre | Country |
|---|---|---|---|---|
| 2026 | Sira | TV Series | Melodrama, Romance, Political | Spain |
| 2025 | Los Protegidos. Un Nuevo Poder | TV series | Fiction, Fantasy, Thriller | Spain |
| 2023 | ¿Preparados para el Tsunami? | TV Movie | Documentary | Spain |
| 2022 | Desaparecidos. La Serie (S3) | TV series | Crime, Drama | Spain |
| 2021 | Desaparecidos. La Serie (S2) | TV series | Crime, Drama | Spain |
| 2020 | Desaparecidos. La Serie (S1); Benidorm | TV series TV Series | Crime, Drama; Romantic Comedy | Spain; Spain |
| 2019 | Allí abajo (S5) | TV series | Romantic Comedy | Spain |
| 2018 | Sabuesos; Allí Abajo (S4); The Russian Bride | TV series TV Series; Feature Film | Comedy, Mystery; Romantic Comedy; Thriller | Spain; Spain; USA |
| 2017 | Allí Abajo (S3) | TV series | Romantic Comedy | Spain |
| 2016 | La sonata del silencio Allí abajo (S2) | TV series TV Series | Romantic Tragedy; Romantic Comedy | Spain; Spain |
| 2015 | Allí abajo (S1); Algo Que Celebrar | TV series TV Series | Romantic Comedy; Comedy | Spain; Spain |
| 2014 | Vive Cantando (S2) | TV series | Comedy, Musical | Spain |
| 2013 | Vive Cantando (S1); Avenged (AKA Savaged) | TV series Feature Film | Comedy, Musical; Horror, Fantasy | Spain; USA |
| 2012 | El tiempo entre costuras Los Protegidos (S3) | TV series TV Series | Melodrama, Romance, Political; Fiction, Comedy, Thriller | Spain; Spain |
| 2011 | Los Protegidos (S2) | TV series | Fiction, Comedy, Thriller | Spain |
| 2010 | Los Protegidos (S1); Ways to Live Forever | TV series Feature Film | Fiction, Comedy, Thriller; Drama | Spain; UK/ Spain |
| 2009 | LLa chica de ayer (Life on Mars); Cambio de Sentido | TV series TV Movie | Fiction, Drama; Documentary | UK/ Spain; México/ Spain |
| 2008 | Shevernatze | Feature Film | Dark Comedy | Spain |
| 2007 | Cielito Lindo | Feature Film | Action, Adventure | USA |
| 2006 | Mía Sarah; Madrid de arriba abajo | Feature Film; TV Show | Romantic Comedy; Documentary | Spain; Spain |

=== Discography ===
| Year | Title | Genre | Credit | Record label |
|---|---|---|---|---|
| 2022 | The Russian Bride | Soundtrack | Composer, Producer | Plaza Mayor Company |
| 2021 | Avenged | Soundtrack | Composer, Producer | Plaza Mayor Company |
| 2020 | Live from Cordoba | Live Performance | Composer, Orchestrator, Conductor, Producer | Plaza Mayor Company |
| 2017 | La Sonata del Silencio | Soundtrack | Composer, Orchestrator, Conductor, Piano, Producer | Plaza Mayor Company |
| 2014 | El Tiempo Entre Costuras | Soundtrack | Composer, Orchestrator, Piano, Producer | MovieScore Media |
| 2011 | Ways to Live Forever | Soundtrack | Composer, Orchestrator, Conductor, Piano, Producer | MovieScore Media |
| 2007 | Mía Sarah | Soundtrack | Composer, Orchestrator, Conductor, Piano, Producer | Filmax Music |

== Awards and nominations ==
GoldSpirit Awards

| Year | Category | Project | Outcome |
|---|---|---|---|
| 2014 | Best Spanish Original Soundtrack | El Tiempo Entre Costuras | Won |
| 2014 | Best Music for Television | El Tiempo Entre Costuras | Nominated |
| 2014 | Best Spanish Composer | | Nominated |
| 2014 | Best Breakthrough Composer | | Won |

Academy of Sciences and Arts of Television of Spain - Iris Awards

| Year | Category | Project | Outcome |
|---|---|---|---|
| 2013 | Best Music for Television | El Tiempo Entre Costuras | Won |

International Film Music Critics Association

| Year | Category | Project | Outcome |
|---|---|---|---|
| 2013 | Breakthrough Film Composer of the Year | | Nominated |
| 2013 | Best Original Score for a Television Series | El Tiempo Entre Costuras | Nominated |

Spanish Film Music Critics Awards

| Year | Category | Project | Outcome |
|---|---|---|---|
| 2013 | Best Score | El Tiempo Entre Costuras | Nominated |
| 2013 | Best Composer | | Nominated |
| 2007 | Best Breakthrough Composer | | Nominated |

Cinema Writers Circle Awards, Spain

| Year | Category | Project | Outcome |
|---|---|---|---|
| 2011 | Best Music | Ways to Live Forever | Nominated |
| 2007 | Best Music | Mia Sarah | Nominated |

Garden State Film Festival

| Year | Category | Project | Outcome |
|---|---|---|---|
| 2007 | Best Orchestral Composition | Mia Sarah | Won |

Premio Internacional de Composición Coral “Villa de Rota”

| Year | Category | Outcome |
|---|---|---|
| 1995 | Best Choral Composition | Won |
