= Roland SH-101 =

Synthesizer

SH-101
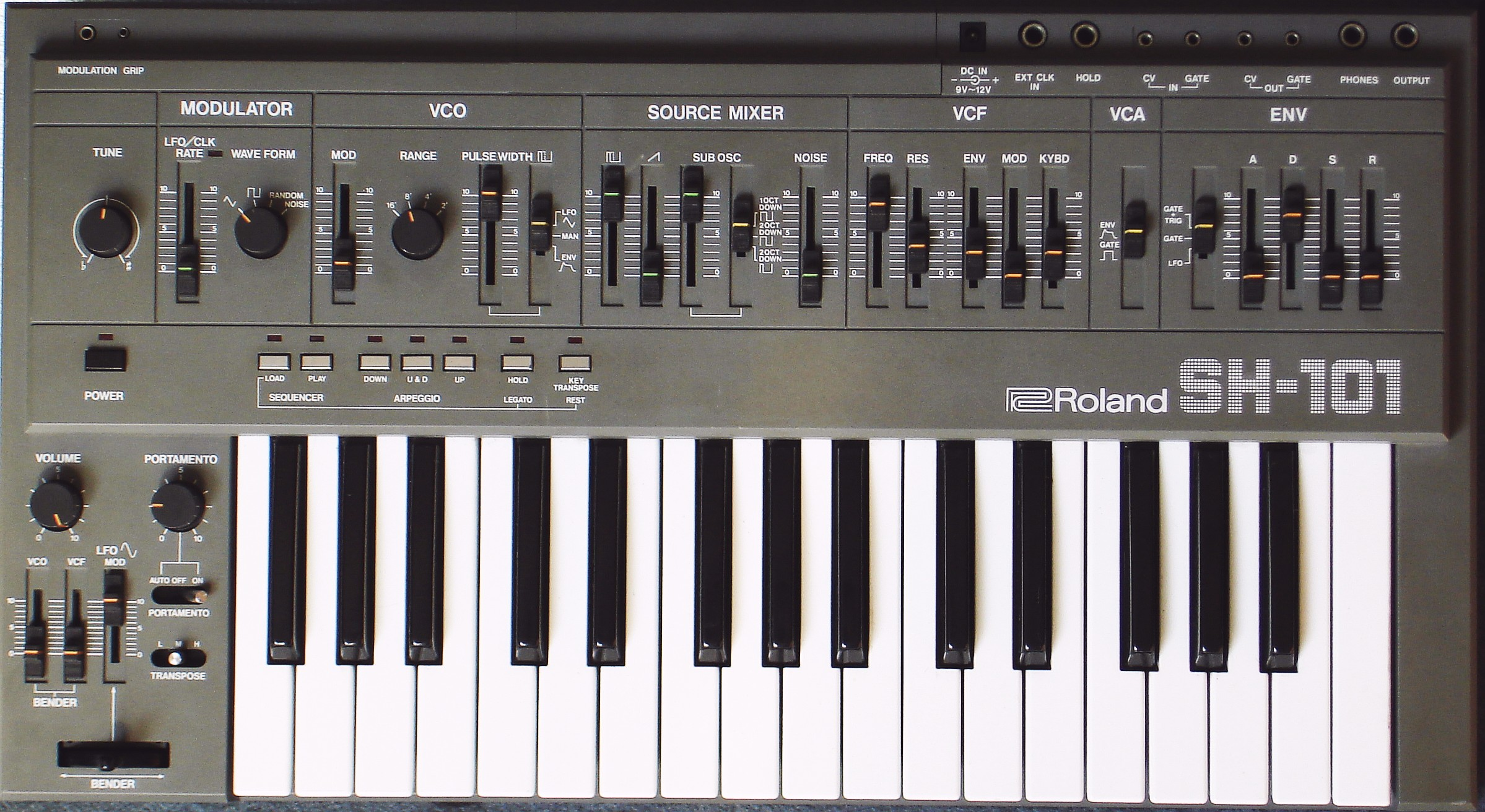
- Roland SH-101 grey model
- Manufacturer: Roland
- Dates: November 1982–1986
- Price: US$495; GB£249; JP¥59,800 (1980s)

Technical specifications
- Polyphony: Monophonic
- Timbrality: Monotimbral
- Oscillator: 1 VCO with 3 simultaneously mixable waveforms : Pulse with PWM, Saw and Sub wave (selectable -1 Oct. Square, -2 Oct. Square or -2 Oct Pulse); The Pulse wave can be modulated by LFO, by Envelope or manually Noise is also available at the oscillator mixing stage
- LFO: 1 LFO: triangle, square, random and noise waveforms
- Synthesis type: Analog subtractive
- Filter: 1 resonant VCF, modulated with ADSR, LFO, keyboard tracking and/or bender controller
- Attenuator: ADSR envelope, triggered by gate or LFO
- Aftertouch expression: No
- Velocity expression: No
- Storage memory: 100 step sequencer
- Effects: Arpeggiator (up, down, up/down)

Input/output
- Keyboard: 32-note
- Left-hand control: Bender assignable to VCF frequency and/or pitch as well as pitch bend and mod wheels on attachable handle
- External control: CV/Gate, Clock in

The Roland SH-101 is an analog synthesizer manufactured by the Roland Corporation between 1982 and 1986. Though it did not achieve significant commercial success, it later became a staple of electronic music in the 1990s, particularly house music.

== Sound and features ==
The SH-101 is monophonic, meaning it can only play one note at a time. It has a single oscillator, a sub-oscillator, a low-pass filter, a mixer allowing users to blend different waveforms plus a noise generator, and an arpeggiator and sequencer. An ADSR envelope controls the filter and VCA, and the filter, VCA, pitch and pulse width can be controlled with an LFO. Users can attach an optional handgrip with modulation controls and shoulder strap to play the SH-101 as a keytar, and it can also be powered via battery. According to MusicRadar, the SH-101 has "snappy and razor-sharp" bass, "squelchy and expressive" leads, and a "piercing yet smooth" filter.

== Release ==
The SH-101 launched in the US at $495 and in UK at £249, making it much more affordable than the popular digital synthesisers of the time. Two limited-edition versions were also released in red and blue colours, in contrast to the original grey. Roland marketed the SH-101 to the emerging keytar market, with slogans such as "freedom for expression" and "[the 101] takes you where you want to go". However, it was outsold by the digital Yamaha DX7 and was discontinued in 1986.

== Legacy ==
In 2014, MusicRadar wrote that SH-101 was both "brilliant" and affordable: "Never a rock star's instrument like the Minimoog or Prophet-5, the 101 was a synthesiser for the rest of us, and a damned fine one, too." In 2016, Fact named the SH-101 one of the 14 most important synthesisers in history. It was used on 1980s hits such as OMD's "Locomotion" and Go West's "We Close Our Eyes".

During the 1990s resurgence of analogue synthesisers, the SH-101 became a staple in dance music studios. It has been used by acts including the Prodigy, Orbital, Aphex Twin, Jimmy Edgar, the Chemical Brothers, Bicep, Astral Projection, 808 State, the Grid, the Future Sound of London, Boards of Canada, Autechre, Luke Vibert, the Crystal Method, Union Jack and Astral Projection.

== Reissues and clones ==
In 2018, Roland introduced the Boutique SH-01A, a virtual analog synth, based on its Analog Circuit Behavior (ACB) technology. It is available with or without a keyboard.

In 2019, Behringer began producing a clone of SH-101, the MS-101. The layout and sound is close to the original, with the additions such as MIDI and USB.

In 2019, Superlative Instruments launched a Kickstarter campaign to produce the SB-1 Space Bee, very similar in layout to the SH-101 with a unique keyboard design and all keys and keyboard in dark gray.

In 2023, Roland introduced the S-1 Aira Compact, based on its Analog Circuit Behavior (ACB) technology. It is a small form factor with built in keyboard.

== Software emulations ==
In June 2014, Roland announced the release of SH-101 Plug-Out synth for the Aira System 1, using ACB that according to Roland "painstakingly recreates the hardware’s sound down to the behavior of the original circuits."

In June 2020, Roland released Zenology plugins for Roland synths, which includes an SH-101 emulator. Zenology engines are not based on the ACB algorithms but on a less power-hungry technology called ABM (analogue behaviour modelling). Roland describe ACB as being 'ultra-precise' whereas ABM offers 'a more holistic and dynamic recreation' of vintage synthesizers; in other words, the company's engineers have attempted to obtain similar results without modelling in as much detail as before.

Other software emulators include Togu Audio Line TAL-Bassline-101, D16 Group LuSH-101, Togu Audio Line TAL-Bassline (a free limited version of the other Togu app)., and Softube Model 82.
