= Aira Compact =

Synthesiser series

Aira Compact (stylised as AIRA Compact) is a series of portable electronic musical instruments released by the Japanese company Roland. Originally released on 10 May 2022, the series currently comprises five models: the T-8, a drum machine; J-6, a chord synthesiser; E-4, a vocal effects unit; S-1, a sound design-oriented synthesiser that was released a year later in May 2023; and the P-6, a sampler released in September 2024.

The Aira Compacts were received well by reviewers, who gave the series high review scores. They are the recipients of two design awards: the IF Product Design Award and Red Dot Design Award.

== Release ==
The original trio of Aira Compacts (T-8, J-6 and E-4) were released on 10 May 2022. Two additional models, the S-1 and P-6, were released a year later in May 2023 during the Superbooth trade show and on 12 September 2024 respectively. They are all priced at $200.

== Design ==
Each model in the Aira Compact series shares a similar design, using sounds recreated from Roland's past synthesisers and drum machines digitally using their Analog Circuit Behaviour (ACB) technology.

The Aira Compacts measure 18 by 10 centimetres (7.1 in × 3.9 in). They are all portable and have a built-in lithium-ion battery, similar to the design of Korg's Volca series. A basic eight-segment LED display is also present for reading parameter values. Each Aira Compact can be used either individually or connected together. They have MIDI, sync, audio (over minijack) and USB-C connectors to interface with other devices. At the top right of each model, there is a volume control.

=== Models ===
==== T-8 Beat Machine ====
The T-8 is a drum machine loosely based on Roland's TR-808, TR-909, and TR-606. It has six drum sounds available: bass drum, snare drum, clap, tom, open hi-hat and closed hi-hat. Each sound has control over its tuning (with the exception of the hi-hats) and decay envelope.

The drum machine has a six-track step sequencer with step looping and step probability functions. The sequencer can include up to 32 steps. The T-8 also includes a bass synthesiser inspired by Roland's TB-303, with the original's slide and accent sequencer functions. The unit also comes with delay, overdrive and reverb effects. Side-chain compression is also present.

==== J-6 Chord Synthesizer ====
The J-6 is a synthesiser using sounds based on Roland's Juno 60. The sound engine consists of 64 presets and allows control over the filter cutoff, filter resonance, envelope attack and envelope release. The synthesiser can be played using a one octave keyboard (chromatic) and has four voices of polyphony. It has a chord-based sequencer (with 100 chords able to be used) and a filter, as well as delay and reverb effects.

==== E-4 Voice Tweaker ====
The E-4 is a vocal effects unit. It can apply various effects, including pitch and formant shifters, pitch correction, vocoder and has a built-in looper with 24 seconds of memory. For the vocoder function, the E-4 can receive MIDI signals to play it using a keyboard.

==== S-1 Tweak Synth ====
The S-1 is a synthesiser inspired by Roland's SH-101. In terms of controls, the synthesiser has 26 function buttons (which double as a two octave keyboard). It has oscillator (with square, saw and noise waveforms, in addition to sub oscillators), LFO, filter (which will not self-oscillate) and envelope sections, as well as chorus, delay and reverb effects. As well as the basic waveforms, users can "draw" their own or use the "Osc Chop" function to make more metallic sounds. Unlike the monophonic original, it is four-voice polyphonic. The S-1 has a 64-step sequencer with motion recording and can save up to 64 sequences.

==== P-6 Creative Sampler ====
The P-6, announced in September 2024, is a sampler and sequencer. Samples can be directly recorded on the device or loaded via a smartphone or a computer, by using the P-6 SampleTool app.

== Reception ==
The Aira Compacts were received well by reviewers. Bruce Aisher of MusicRadar gave the series 4.5/5 stars in their review, commenting on the quality of the sound engine present. He noted that the lack of a more detailed display meant that the manual was needed for more complex processes. William Stokes gave the series 8/10 stars in his review for MusicTech magazine. He commented that "with the Aira Compact series, Roland succeeds in making portable performance instruments that offer accessibility and powerful sound", but he disliked the simplified control over their sound engines. Parker Hall of Wired gave the series a nine out of ten in his review, commenting on the series' portability and sound quality in particular. Terrence O'Brien of Engadget gave the Aira Compacts a positive review and commented that "Roland is bringing some serious firepower to the world of tiny, dirt-cheap music gear. It’s borrowing features and tech from its more expensive instruments that start at $400, and bringing it down to almost impulse purchase levels". He specifically highlighted the E-4 due to its vocal processing capabilities, which are uncommon in budget hardware devices.

In his individual review of the T-8 for DJ Mag, Declan McGlynn gave the drum machine a 7.9/10 rating. He found that the T-8 "has a lot of functionality in a small box", but could have benefitted from a wider sonic palette. Despite this, he thought it "was a really powerful unit for $199".

O'Brien also reviewed the S-1 when it was released. He called it the "most compelling" Aira Compact due to its more expansive feature set, but also found it to be the "most frustrating" due to its complicated layout. He compared the Aira Compacts to the Korg Volcas and said that the latter series "sounded good enough, [was] affordable, and unintimidating", features that he thought "Roland seems to have gotten the first two parts [of] down" but needed "to work on the last ingredient". Stokes gave the S-1 an 8/10 again in his review, which agreed with the points made by O'Brien on the whole.

=== Awards ===
The Aira Compact series has received two awards for product design:

- iF Product Design Award (2023)
- Red Dot Design Award (2023)
