= Nerea Garmendia =

Spanish actress

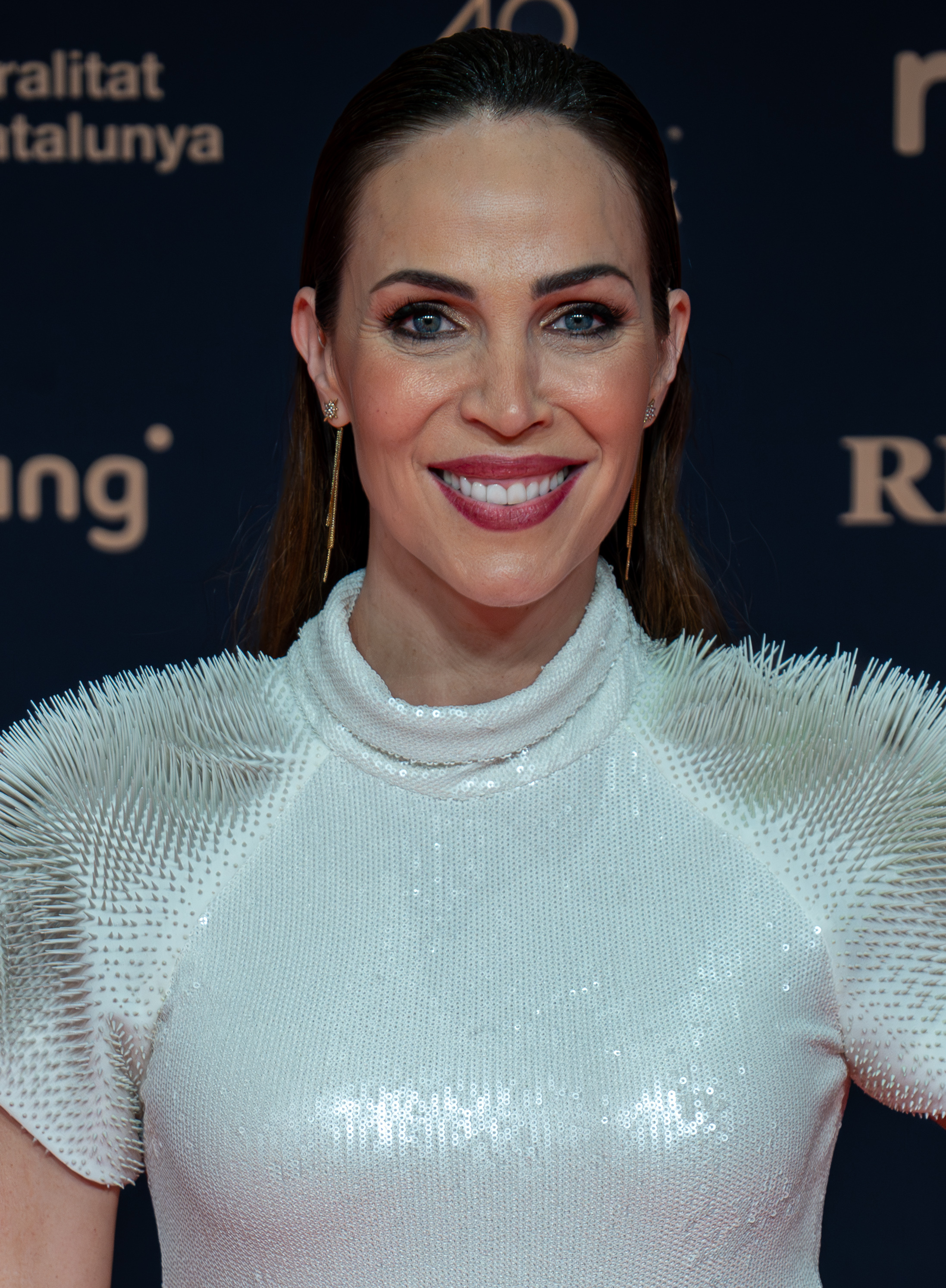
- Garmendia in 2026
- Born: Nerea Garmendia Martínez; 29 October 1979 (age 46); Beasain, Gipuzkoa, Spain
- Occupation: Actress
- Years active: 2000-present

Nerea Garmendia Martínez (born 29 October 1979) is a Spanish actress and television presenter who has developed her career in theater and television.

== Biography ==
Born in the Gipuzkoan town of Beasain, she always knew she wanted to be an actress and at the age of 16 she decided to tell her parents and get down to work.

She studied at La Salle school, at the age of 10 she moved to San Sebastian where she lived until she moved to Madrid to study at the Cristina Rota School of Dramatic Art and at Alicia Hermida's La Barraca.

Nerea began to become famous among the Basque public with the ETB2 program Vaya Semanita where she was one of the protagonists. The program was presented by Óscar Terol and was so famous that TVE1 decided to launch it at a national level with Made In China. Of course the program kept all its actors, including Nerea herself. Unfortunately it was not very successful and was soon withdrawn from the grid.

Previously she collaborated in other television programs such as El Rey de la casa (TV Valenciana) and Easy Peasy (in the Basque autonomous ETB), in the series Hasiberriak (ETB1) and La noche... con Fuentes y Cía (Telecinco). She also presented the daily live show KTM and was Sara Montiel's crazy waitress in Marvellous, the international campaign for MTV's European Music Awards, and in several short films, including Portal mortal.

But most of the Spanish public remembers her for playing the role of Ruth, the psychologist of the San Antonio police station in the TV series Los hombres de Paco. Nerea joined the series in 2006 and ended her character in July 2007, after it was discovered that her character was the evil mole of the police station and bad guy of the season. She remained in the series for 3 seasons. During that time she combined her work in the series with her debut on the stage with the play Nunca es fácil where she shared the lead role with Nancho Novo (2006-2007), the play premiered at the Teatro Príncipe de Gran Vía in Madrid and was performed for a year.

In 2007-08 she had the opportunity to collaborate on two film projects, L.A.: Fear and Welcome Papra.

In 2009 she worked as the futuristic-looking Presenter 3.0 for the Antena3 network, which she combined with her role as Silvia Comas in the Antena3 series 90-60-90, diario secreto de una adolescente where she formed a love triangle with Jesús Olmedo and Esmeralda Moya.

In 2010 she traveled to Colombia to record La Reina del Sur a co-production of Antena 3 and Telemundo, which was a huge success in the U.S., Mexico and South America. Upon her return she returned to the theater with 19:30 a play about political corruption with which she toured for a year (2010-2011) where she shared the stage with colleagues such as: Fernando Cayo, Ana Wagener, Roberto Enríquez, Adolfo Fernández, Sonia Almarcha and Antonio Molero.

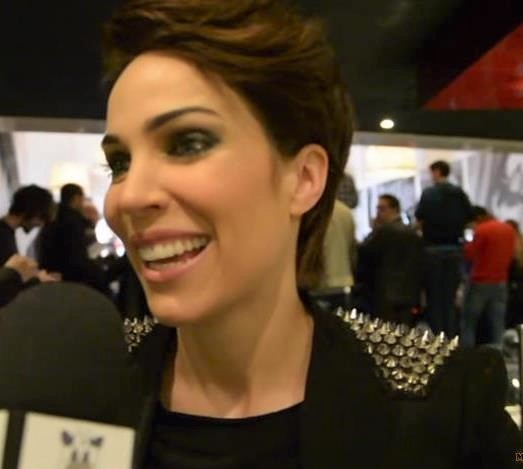
Nerea Garmendia in 2016

In 2011 she participated in the sitcom Los Quién (Antena 3). In 2012 she debuted as a monologuist in Gente Seria (ETB). Also in this year she made a cameo in the Antena3 series Fenómenos.

In 2013 she participated in the Antena 3, program Splash! Famosos al agua. She was a semi-finalist, 8th out of 28 contestants who participated. She was the first woman to dive from 10 meters, the only contestant to dive from 10 meters in all her jumps, both individual and synchronized, and came in first place in two of the three elimination galas in which she participated. That same year she returned to the stage with the comedy Tres by Juan Carlos Rubio, along with Vanesa Romero.

That same year she also participated in the videoclip of the song "Huelo el miedo" of the Power metal band Warcry.

In March 2015, she began presenting in prime time on La 1 the variety show La Alfombra Roja Palace alongside Jota Abril and Berta Collado. As she herself later argued, she left the show to focus on other projects. Thus, Garmendia only presented one gala of the Spanish TV show.

In May 2015, she took the stage of Teatro Alfil to play the role of Ajo, in the romantic comedy Te elegiría otra vez, written and directed by Sara Escudero, and in the same year she also premiered the play Espacio by director David Marqués.

In September 2016, it was announced that she joined the filming of the third season of the Antena 3 series Allí Abajo.

In February 2021, together with Víctor Amilibia, she launches a new comedy show entitled Vaya Pack de Vascos in monologue format.

== Filmography ==
=== Short films ===
Films
Year	Title	Character	Type
2007	La mosquita muerta	Alicia	Short film
2012	Sssh!	Agente Jefa	Short film
2012	Revenge	Miriam	Short film
2013	6xpersona	Laura	Short film

=== Television series ===
Television series
Year	Title	Channel	Character	Duration
2000	Hasiberriak	ETB1	Maite	30 episodes
2003 - 2005	Vaya semanita	ETB2	Various characters	83 episodes
2006 - 2008	Los hombres de Paco	Antena 3	Ruth Montalbán	40 episodes
2008	Maitena: Estados alterados	laSexta	Nuria	1 episode
2009	¿Hay alguien ahí?	Cuatro	Manuela	1 episode
2009	90-60-90, diario secreto de una adolescente	Antena 3	Silvia Comas	8 episodes
2010	Qué vida más triste	laSexta	Amaia	1 episode
2010	Amar en tiempos revueltos	La 1	Catherine	2 episodes
2011	Los Quién	Antena 3	Eva	1 episode
2011	La reina del sur	Telemundo	Eugenia Alfarje Montijo	10 episodes
2012	Fenómenos	Antena 3	Patricia	1 episode
2015	Gym Tony	Cuatro	Melani Roca	1 episode
2017 - 2019	Allí abajo	Antena 3	Gotzone Abaroa	31 episodes

=== Television programs ===
Television programs
Year	Title	Channel	Role
1998 - 1999	Easy Peasy	ETB	Presenter
1999	KTM	ETB	Presenter
2004	La noche... con Fuentes y cía	Telecinco	Collaborator
2005	Made in China	TVE	Comedian
2013	Splash! Famosos al agua	Antena 3	Contestant
2015	Amigas y conocidas	TVE	Collaborator
2015	La Alfombra Roja Palace	TVE	Presenter
2020	El cazador	TVE	Guest

== Theater ==
- 19:30 (2010), by Adolfo Fernández and Ramón Ibarra.
- Nunca es fácil (2006-2007), by Nancho Novo.
- El tomatazo (2001)
- Emociones abstractas (1998), by Lourdes Villagrán.
- Tres, Juan Carlos Rubio. (2013)
- Némesis, Guillermo Lanza. (2011)
- Te elegiría otra vez, Sara Escudero. (2015)
- Espacio (2015), de David Marqués
- Todo sobre Vázquez (2016) by Jaime Palacios
- Redford & Newman. Dos hombres sin destino (2019) by Ángel Martín alongside Miki Nadal and Sinacio
- El club de los tarados (2019) monólogos inclusivos.
- Vaya Pack de Vascos (2021) monólogos junto a Víctor Amilibia.

== Private life ==
From 2008 to 2020 she was romantically involved with the Sevillian actor Jesús Olmedo.
