= Dancing Galaxy =

1997 studio album by Astral Projection

Studio album by Astral Projection
- Released: 20 October 1997
- Recorded: October 1996–June 1997
- Genre: Goa trance; psychedelic trance; nitzhonot
- Length: 79:56
- Label: Trust In Trance Records
- Producer: Lior Perlmutter; Avi Nissim

Astral Projection chronology
The Astral Files (1996)	Dancing Galaxy (1997)	Another World (1999)

Singles from Dancing Galaxy
- 1. "Dancing Galaxy" Released: 17 November 1997; 2. "Liquid Sun" Released: 2000

Dancing Galaxy is the third studio album by the Israel goa trance band Astral Projection. It was released on 20 October 1997, through Trust In Trance Records. It has become one of the best-selling trance albums.

The voices in the songs "Dancing Galaxy", "No One Ever Dreams" and "Ambient Galaxy (Disco Valley Mix)" is taken from the film Dune (1984).

The voice in the song "Flying Into A Star" is taken from the sixth season of Star Trek: The Next Generation's: episode 22, Suspicions (1993).

The Japanese release includes a bonus three-inch CD single.

== Singles ==
"Dancing Galaxy" ,17 November 1997, was the first song to be a released as a single from the album, it includes the song "Ambient Galaxy (Disco Valley Mix)" as a b–side.

"Liquid Sun", 2000, was released as a second single, with a remix by Cass & Slide. It peaked at number 91 in UK singles charts, number 27 in the dance singles chart and number 19 in UK Independent chart. Astral Projection's only chartering song there.

== Critical reception ==
Professional ratings
Review scores
Source	Rating
AllMusic	4.5/5 stars

John Bush from AllMusic said "The climax of Astral Projection's search for intelligent trance, Dancing Galaxy offers wave after wave of exquisitely produced acid lines on tracks like "No One Ever Dreams," "Soundform" and the title track."

== Track listing ==
All tracks are written by Lior Perlmutter and Avi Nissim.

No.	Title	Length
1.	"Dancing Galaxy"	9:18
2.	"Soundform"	8:12
3.	"Flying Into A Star"	9:44
4.	"No One Ever Dreams"	8:25
5.	"Cosmic Ascension" (Featuring D.J. Jorg)	10:18
6.	"Life On Mars"	9:09
7.	"Liquid Sun"	11:06
8.	"Ambient Galaxy (Disco Valley Mix)"	13:44
Total length:		01:19:56

Japan edition bonus songs
No.	Title	Length
1.	"Time Began With The Universe (The End Of Time Mix)"	7:21
2.	"State Of Mind"	6:44
3.	"Maian Dream"	6:50
Total length:		01:40:51

== Credits and personnel ==
Locations

- Recorded at Dance City Studios, Tel Aviv
- Digital Mastering at Village mastering

Musicians

- Lior Perlmutter – songwriting, programming, producer and mixing
- Avi Nissim – songwriting, programming, producer
- Ben Bernfeld – digital Mastering

Engineering

- Lior Perlmutter – engineering

Creative

- Ido Eshed – art direction and design
- Yossi F. – art direction and design
