= Allí abajo =

Spanish TV series

- Genre: Comedy
- Created by: César Benítez; Aitor Gabilondo; Óscar Terol
- Written by: Óscar Terol; Marta Sánchez; Olatz Arroyo; Natxo López
- Directed by: Iñaki Mercero; Joaquín Mazón; Jacobo Martos
- Starring: Jon Plazaola; María León; Salva Reina; Mariano Peña; Ane Gabarain; Mari Paz Sayago; Óscar Terol; Gorka Aguinagalde; Iker Galartza; Alfonso Sánchez; Noemí Ruiz; Alazne Etxebarria; David Arnaiz; Nerea Garmendia
- Theme music composer: Cesar Benito
- Composer: Cesar Benito
- Country of origin: Spain
- Original language: Spanish
- No. of seasons: 5
- No. of episodes: 69

Production
- Executive producers: César Benítez; Aitor Gabilondo
- Production locations: Seville; San Sebastián
- Running time: 75 minutes approx.
- Production companies: Plano a Plano; Atresmedia

Original release
- Network: Antena 3
- Release: April 7, 2015 – June 11, 2019

Allí abajo (English: Down there) is a Spanish television comedy series produced by Plano a Plano for Antena 3. Although it is compared to successful film Ocho apellidos vascos, creators César Benítez and Aitor Gabilondo claim they had on their minds the concept of the show long before the movie, and that it has more in common with French film Bienvenue chez les Ch'tis. It premiered to more than 6 million viewers on a simulcast airing on Antena 3, Neox and Nova, becoming the most-watched series premiere of a Spanish television show since Aída in 2005 and the best series premiere for an Antena 3 show since Compuesta y sin novio in 1994.

== Plot ==
The series revolves around Iñaki (Jon Plazaola), a 30-year-old Basque man who has never left Euskadi. He lives in San Sebastián with his mother Maritxu (Ane Gabarain), the classic absorbent, dominant Basque matriarch who sees Iñaki as a perennial child unable to move forward in life on his own. Iñaki runs a bar he inherited from his father, where his only affective exchange is the weekly game of mus with his longtime friends, although Nekane (Alazne Etxebarria), the waitress, is madly in love with him but fails to tell him time and time again.

One day, Iñaki is forced to join his mother in a trip to Seville, a trip he definitely isn't ready for. Nothing will ever be the same for him once he finds himself stuck "down there".

== Cast ==
=== Main ===
- Jon Plazaola as Iñaki Irazabalbeitia
- María León as Carmen Almonte
- Salva Reina as José Narváez
- Mariano Peña as Benito Benjumea (main, seasons 1–3, 5; recurring, season 4)
- Ane Gabarain as Maritxu Galarza
- Mari Paz Sayago as Dolores Ocaña
- Óscar Terol as Antxón Oleaga
- Gorka Aguinagalde as Koldo Intxaustegui
- Iker Galartza as Peio
- Alfonso Sánchez as Rober Almenar (main, seasons 1–2)
- Noemí Ruiz as Trini Lozano (main, seasons 1–3; recurring, season 4)
- Alazne Etxebarria as Nekane (main, seasons 1; recurring, season 2)
- David Arnaiz as Cristóbal Benjumea (recurring, seasons 1–2; main, seasons 3–5)
- Nerea Garmendia as Gotzone Abaroa (main, seasons 3–4; guest, season 5)

=== Recurring ===
- Maribel Salas as Bego Galarza
- Santi Ugalde as Sabino Goikolea
- Rocío García Molina as Irene Escobar
- Carmina Barrios as Luci
- Carmen Frigolet as Merche
- Antonia Gómez as Piedad
- Teresa Quintero as Ángela Parrón
- Alberto López as Rafi Almonte
- Beatriz Cotobal as Isabel

== Soundtrack ==
The original music score is composed and produced by Cesar Benito

== Episodes ==
=== Series overview ===
Season	Episodes	Originally released	
Season	Episodes	First released	Last released
1	13	April 7, 2015	June 30, 2015
2	15	February 12, 2016	May 24, 2016
3	16	March 20, 2017	July 3, 2017
4	15	April 2, 2018	July 9, 2018
5	10	March 19, 2019	June 11, 2019

=== Season 1 (2015) ===
No. overall	No. in season	Title	Directed by	Written by	Original release date	Spain viewers (millions)	Share
1	1	"Anything South of the Basque Country is like Africa" (África empieza en Burgos)	Iñaki Mercero	Óscar Terol, Marta Sánchez & Olatz Arroyo	April 7, 2015	6.343	32.4%
Iñaki has never left the Basque Country until he is forced to accompany his mother Maritxu in a weeklong trip to Seville. On their first night in the city, Maritxu falls down the stairs at the hotel, goes into a coma and is hospitalized at a local clinic. Despite the efforts of the chief nurse, Carmen Almonte, and the rest of the medical team, Iñaki doesn't trust them at first.
2	2	"Room 16" (Habitación 116)	Iñaki Mercero	Óscar Terol, Marta Sánchez & Olatz Arroyo	April 14, 2015	4.615	22.7%
Iñaki gives in to the idea that he might have to stay in Seville for a long time. While he is trying to figure out where he can go, Carmen offers to rent him a spare room of her apartment. Meanwhile in San Sebastián, Bego, Maritxu's sister, is beginning to suspect something isn't going well in Seville.
3	3	"Bego vs. Macarena" (La de Begoña contra La Macarena)	Joaquín Mazón	Óscar Terol, Marta Sánchez & Olatz Arroyo	April 21, 2015	4.108	20.9%
Iñaki moves to Carmen's apartment as he continues to struggle with the difficulties of living without his mother, not to mention the fact that Carmen's nosy neighbours seem to be watching his every move. To make matters worse, Bego shows up in Seville hell-bent on taking her sister back to San Sebastián by any means necessary.
4	4	"Up North" (Allí arriba)	Joaquín Mazón	Óscar Terol, Marta Sánchez, Olatz Arroyo & Natxo López	April 28, 2015	4.348	22%
Even though he cheated on her, Rober continues trying to win back Carmen's heart. But since she is always with Iñaki, he decides he has to get rid of the Basque and tries to talk him into going back to Euskadi.
5	5	"All for One" (Todos para uno)	Jacobo Martos	Óscar Terol, Marta Sánchez, Olatz Arroyo & Natxo López	May 5, 2015	4.339	21.9%
Rober seems to be regaining Carmen's trust, but she is afraid of suffering for him again. Her neighbour Luci advises her to give him a chance. Meanwhile, Iñaki's friends (Peio, Koldo and Antxón), collectively known as "la cuadrilla", arrive in Seville.
6	6	"Lights Up" (El encendido)	Jacobo Martos	Óscar Terol, Marta Sánchez, Olatz Arroyo & Natxo López	May 12, 2015	4.272	22.1%
Peio, Koldo and Antxón mistakenly think that Iñaki is engaged on a same-sex relationship with Rober, and decide to support him. Also, during the Seville Fair, they run into his friend's neighbours, Piedad, Luci and Merche.
7	7	"All In" (El órdago)	Iñaki Mercero	Óscar Terol, Marta Sánchez, Olatz Arroyo & Natxo López	May 19, 2015	4.342	22.5%
Iñaki issues an offer to Trini to buy the bar so he can work with Isabel and Rafi.
8	8	"The Virgin of the Miracles" (La virgen de los milagros)	Iñaki Mercero	Óscar Terol, Marta Sánchez, Olatz Arroyo & Natxo López	May 26, 2015	4.237	21.9%
Carmen and Iñaki finally kiss when Maritxu suddenly wakes. Iñaki then tries to trick his mother into believing they are in Euskadi.
9	9	"Agur Lehendakari"	Joaquín Mazón	Óscar Terol, Marta Sánchez, Olatz Arroyo & Natxo López	June 2, 2015	4.388	22.6%
Iñaki is still trying to make his mother believe she is in Euskadi. Benjumea and some of the personnel of the clinic help him with his lie.
10	10	"Not without My Son" (No sin mi hijo)	Joaquín Mazón	Óscar Terol, Marta Sánchez, Olatz Arroyo & Natxo López	June 9, 2015	4.462	23.6%
Maritxu finally finds out about her son's deception and demands to be moved to San Sebastián as soon as possible. Meanwhile, Antxon returns to Seville to help Iñaki with the bar, which he wants to turn into a pintxos restaurant.
11	11	"There's Something About Seville" (Sevilla huele a azar)	Jacobo Martos	Óscar Terol, Marta Sánchez, Olatz Arroyo & Natxo López	June 16, 2015	3.914	20.2%
Maritxu disapproves of Iñaki's relationship with Carmen and tries to get Nekane to seduce him.
12	12	"Take Me Back" (Y volver, y volver...)	Jacobo Martos	Óscar Terol, Marta Sánchez, Olatz Arroyo & Natxo López	June 23, 2015	3.117	20%
After a brief reunion, Carmen breaks up with Rober again, and he teams up with Maritxu to sabotage the nurse's relationship with Iñaki.
13	13	"Maite Zaitut"	Jacobo Martos	Óscar Terol, Marta Sánchez, Olatz Arroyo & Natxo López	June 30, 2015	4.182	24.4%
José, the hospital orderly, is in love with Benjumea's granddaughter Azucena and asks him for his permission to marry her, as Iñaki has been hospitalized in the clinic after being rescued from a ditch and Rober does his best to prevent Carmen from knowing it. Meanwhile, Maritxu is back in San Sebastián, furious over her son's decision to stay in Seville, and takes her frustrations out on Bego.

Note: Episode 1 was simulcast on Antena 3, Neox and Nova.

=== Season 2 (2016) ===
No. overall	No. in season	Title	Directed by	Original release date	Spain viewers (millions)	Share
14	1	"Love Is in the North" (Para hacer bien el amor hay que subir)	Álvaro Fernández Armero	February 12, 2016	3.662	20.5%
15	2	"Father of the Bride" (El padre de la novia)	Álvaro Fernández Armero	February 19, 2016	3.288	19.3%
16	3	"The Hunt" (La caza)	Jacobo Martos	February 26, 2016	3.285	18.8%
17	4	"Liar, Liar" (De cuernos, ni a un tintero)	Jacobo Martos	March 4, 2016	2.944	17.3%
18	5	"The Party" (El guateque)	Alfonso Arandia Loroño	March 11, 2016	2.834	16.9%
19	6	"Valentine's Day" (San Valentín)	Alfonso Arandia Loroño	March 18, 2016	2.917	18.7%
20	7	"My Big Fat Basque Wedding" (Mi gran boda vasca)	Álvaro Fernández Armero	March 29, 2016	3.939	21.7%
21	8	"A Double Wife" (Esposado)	Álvaro Fernández Armero	April 5, 2016	3.332	17.8%
22	9	"My Mother's Boyfriend" (El novio de mi madre)	Jacobo Martos	April 12, 2016	3.037	17.5%
23	10	"Father, Give Me Your Blessing" (Bendígame, padre)	Jacobo Martos	April 19, 2016	2.935	16.2%
24	11	"The Slip-Up" (El desliz)	Alfonso Arandia Loroño	April 26, 2016	2.913	16.9%
25	12	"The Hangover" (Resacón en Triana)	Alfonso Arandia Loroño	May 3, 2016	2.960	17.4%
26	13	"Resurrected" (El resucitao)	Álvaro Fernández Armero	May 10, 2016	2.966	16.9%
27	14	"Gau festa aitarekin"	Jacobo Martos	May 17, 2016	3.034	17.6%
28	15	"I Do" (Sí, quiero)	Jacobo Martos	May 24, 2016	3.509	20.5%

=== Season 3 (2017) ===
No. overall	No. in season	Title	Directed by	Original release date	Spain viewers (millions)	Share
29	1	"Carpe diem"	Jacobo Martos	March 20, 2017	3.842	23.7%
30	2	"The Inheritance" (La herencia)	Jacobo Martos	March 27, 2017	3.567	21.1%
31	3	"Closed for Refurbishment" (Cerrado por reformas)	Alfonso Arandia Loroño	April 3, 2017	3.141	19.4%
32	4	"The Test" (La prueba)	Alfonso Arandia Loroño	April 10, 2017	2.944	19.3%
33	5	"Salsa" (La salsa de la vida)	Álvaro Fernández Armero	April 17, 2017	3.007	19.1%
34	6	"The New Kaia" (El nuevo Kaia)	Álvaro Fernández Armero	April 24, 2017	3.038	19.2%
35	7	"The Rabbit Position" (La postura del conejo)	Jacobo Martos	May 1, 2017	2.523	16.0%
36	8	"The Black Widow" (La viuda negra)	Jacobo Martos	May 8, 2017	3.128	19.8%
37	9	"Don Benjumea of the Jungle" (Don Benjumea de la jungla)	Iñaki Mercero	May 15, 2017	3.177	20.2%
38	10	"Multiple Pregnancy" (Embarazo múltiple)	Iñaki Mercero	May 22, 2017	3.109	19.4%
39	11	"San Sebastián's Othello" (El Otelo donostiarra)	Jacobo Martos	May 29, 2017	3.072	19.3%
40	12	"Missed Call" (Llamada perdida)	Jacobo Martos	June 5, 2017	3.328	21.2%
41	13	"The Benjumea Treasure" (El tesoro Benjumea)	Álvaro Fernández Armero	June 12, 2017	3.101	19.8%
42	14	"Two Basques and a Baby" (Dos vascos y un biberón)	Álvaro Fernández Armero	June 19, 2017	3.144	20.6%
43	15	"Two Men and a Pregnancy" (Dos hombres y un embarazo)	Jacobo Martos	June 26, 2017	2.929	19.5%
44	16	"Two Travelers, One Birth and Zero Weddings" (2 viajeros, 1 parto y ninguna boda)	Jacobo Martos	July 3, 2017	3.137	21.3%

=== Season 4 (2018) ===
No. overall	No. in season	Title	Directed by	Original release date	Spain viewers (millions)	Share
45	1	"Baptism: Impossible" (Bautizo imposible)	Jacobo Martos	April 2, 2018	3.190	18.5%
46	2	"The Prodigal Daughter Returns" (El regreso de la hija pródiga)	Jacobo Martos	April 9, 2018	2.630	16.6%
47	3	"The Hard Party" (Esta feria es una ruina)	Javier Quintas	April 16, 2018	2.398	14.9%
48	4	"A Plight at the Opera" (Una tarde en la opereta)	Javier Quintas	April 23, 2018	2.467	16.1%
49	5	"The Marmitako Contest" (El concurso de marmitako)	Jacobo Martos	April 30, 2018	2.234	14.6%
50	6	"The American Dream" (Tú a Donosti y yo a California)	Jacobo Martos	May 7, 2018	2.239	14.7%
51	7	"The Double Agent" (La agente doble)	Javier Quintas	May 14, 2018	2.162	13.8%
52	8	"The Charming Girl from Málaga" (Malagueña salerosa)	Javier Quintas	May 21, 2018	2.303	14.8%
53	9	"San Sebastián Vice" (Corrupción en Donosti)	Jacobo Martos	May 28, 2018	2.056	12.8%
54	10	"Behind Bars" (Entre rejas)	Jacobo Martos	June 4, 2018	2.164	13.8%
55	11	"The Mutiny" (El motín)	Javier Quintas	June 11, 2018	1.975	12.6%
56	12	"The Trial" (El juicio)	Javier Quintas	June 18, 2018	2.032	13.2%
57	13	"The Basque Goodbye" (Despedida a la vasca)	Jacobo Martos & Javier Quintas	June 25, 2018	1.948	13.0%
58	14	"Married... with Children?" (La familia, ¿unida?)	Jacobo Martos & Javier Quintas	July 2, 2018	2.039	14.2%
59	15	"Ups and Downs" (Aúpa y olé)	Jacobo Martos	July 9, 2018	1.776	12.8%

=== Season 5 (2019) ===
No. overall	No. in season	Title	Directed by	Original release date	Spain viewers (millions)	Share
60	1	"The New Híspalis" (La nueva Híspalis)	Jacobo Martos	March 19, 2019	2.695	17.9%
61	2	"Inhuman Resources" (Recursos inhumanos)	Jacobo Martos	March 26, 2019	2.302	14.3%
62	3	"The Chinese Revolution" (Naranjas de la China)	Juanma Pachón	April 2, 2019	2.078	12.8%
63	4	"Make Castrofidel great again"	Juanma Pachón	April 9, 2019	2.164	13.7%
64	5	"Botify"	Jacobo Martos	May 7, 2019	1.664	10.7%
65	6	"Escape Room"	Jacobo Martos	May 14, 2019	1.632	10.4%
66	7	"Blue Blood, Red Blood" (Sangre azul, sangre roja)	Juanma Pachón	May 21, 2019	1.760	11.2%
67	8	"Escape from Igueldo" (Rescate en Igueldo)	Juanma Pachón	May 28, 2019	1.708	10.9%
68	9	"Don't Look" (No mires)	Jacobo Martos	June 4, 2019	1.671	10.9%
69	10	"A Charming Low-Cost Wedding" (Cuqui Low Cost Wedding)	Jacobo Martos	June 11, 2019	1.915	12.8%
