= Avenged (2013 American film) =

Avenged (Savaged)
- Directed by: Michael S. Ojeda
- Written by: Michael S. Ojeda; Deon van Rooyen (additional dialogue)
- Produced by: Jason Gurvitz; Lezlie Wheeler
- Starring: Amanda Adrienne; Tom Ardavany; Rodney Rowland; Ronnie Gene Blevins
- Cinematography: Michael S. Ojeda
- Edited by: Michael S. Ojeda
- Music by: Cesar Benito
- Production companies: Cart Before The Horse Productions; Green Dog Films
- Distributed by: Raven Banner Entertainment
- Release date: October 15, 2013
- Running time: 95 minutes
- Country: United States
- Language: English

Avenged (also known as Savaged) is a 2013 Redsploitation film directed by Michael S. Ojeda. The film premiered on October 15, 2013 and stars Amanda Adrienne as a young woman who seeks revenge on her rapists.

== Plot ==
When Zoe tells her mother that she wants to move in with her long-distance boyfriend, her mother is reluctant to let her drive by herself since she is deaf and would be unable to call for assistance if she needed it. Despite her reservations, Zoe's mother allows her to go alone which proves to have disastrous consequences when, in the course of bravely helping an injured reservation Indian, Zoe is abducted and brutally gang raped by about ten members of a degenerate local gang, descendants of the people who wiped out the Apache tribe inhabiting the lands over two hundred years ago. The preserved skull of the Apache chief is kept by them as a spoil of war.

Once they have finished abusing her, the gang kill and bury Zoe, only for an elderly Native American man, graveyard keeper Grey Wolf, to attempt to bring her back through a ritual. However, the resurrection ceremony also brings back the spirit of the Apache Warchief Mangas Coloradas, who was killed by an ancestor of one of the gang that raped Zoe. The chief, possessing Zoe's body, starts to hunt down her murderers. Grey Wolf finds Zoe and explains what has happened to her, warning the possessed woman that her flesh will continue to rapidly decay, and for both Zoe and the chief to know peace, they must be avenged quickly.

After a number of the gang are killed (disemboweled, shot with arrows and scalped), the remaining ones decide to abduct Zoe's boyfriend, Dane, who has followed Zoe's trail in search of her. They succeed, loading-up on weaponry and barricading themselves in an improvised fortress which they surround with myriad traps. Zoe, in return, is gifted with a long-buried tomahawk and a knife, which once belonged to the murdered Warchief. She eventually hunts down all of the gang except for Trey (Rodney Rowland), who is the direct descendant of the chief's own murderer. When she tells him to "walk in hell" (the last words spoken to the chief before he was decapitated), Trey realizes what has been happening, and flees to the graveyard, torturing Grey Wolf for information on how to put Apache ghosts to rest. Zoe, meanwhile, murders the rest of Trey's family, while Dane, learning that she is alive, heads to the sacred Apache grounds as well.

Trey desperately tries to bury the skull in order to pacify the spirit, but fails to finish before Zoe appears. After fighting her off with a chainsaw, he is defeated and beheaded, completing the Warchief's revenge, but leaving Zoe's body broken and ruined. Dane finds her upper half trying to bury itself. After the tragic pair express their love one final time, Dane, in an act of mercy, cremates Zoe's remains, liberating both souls into the Afterlife.

== Cast ==
- Amanda Adrienne as Zoe
- Tom Ardavany as West
- Rodney Rowland as Trey
- Ronnie Gene Blevins as Jed
- Marc Anthony Samuel as Dane
- Kyle Morris as Skeeter
- Brionne Davis as Cody
- Bobby Field as Investigator #1
- Ernie Charles as Investigator #2
- Ed Fletcher as Roddy
- Jason Gurvitz as Will
- Willow Hale as Woman
- Dan Kiefer as Goat
- Daniel Knight as Sheriff Holt
- John Charles Meyer as Creed
- Joseph Runningfox as Grey Wolf
- Rick Mora as Indian Man

== Production ==
While writing the script for Savaged, director Ojeda pulled from an earlier script he'd written for a film that never came to fruition, which had been inspired by a motel in Superior, Arizona. The motel had given Ojeda a room that had been the site of a death a year prior to his stay, which prompted him to check into the motel for a two-week stay, during which time he wrote the initial script. Savage was created on a limited budget, as Ojeda and the film's producer Jason Gurvitz "[called] in a lot of favors [due to] the quality of work that Michael was able to deliver". Amanda Adrienne's head shot was the first one that Ojeda saw. Adrienne (a natural brunette) had blonde hair when she auditioned for the role. "[Ojeda] wanted a blonde because the blood would look better on the hair and [Adrienne would] look more angelic". Production took place in 2012 and filming took place at an abandoned gold mine outside of Los Angeles.

== Reception ==
Critical reception for Savaged has been positive, and HorrorNews.net rated it at five out of five stars. Fearnet's Scott Weinberg commented that "even at the peak of its gruesomeness, there's still a small sense of restraint", which he felt "helps Savaged go from a potential "rape flick" to a broad yet brutal action/horror flick that, believe it or not, comes off feeling a whole lot like a suitably entertaining gender-reversal on The Crow". Ain't It Cool News also commented on the film's similarity to The Crow, as they felt that this was indicative of the film "[following] the revenge film path a bit too closely" but ultimately viewed the film as "a revenge flick worth checking out". Bloody Disgusting praised the movie's retribution scenes, which they called "Satisfying and absolutely glorious".

== Release ==
The film premiered on October 11, 2013 at the Busan International Film Festival and was renamed Avenged for the home release on 21 April 2015.
