= The Dark Side of the Moon (TV series) =

Russian TV series

- Title card
- Russian: Обратная сторона Луны
- Genre: Crime drama; Speculative fiction; Police procedural
- Based on: Life on Mars
- Directed by: Alexander Kott
- Starring: Pavel Derevyanko; Svetlana Smirnova-Marcinkiewicz; Ivan Shibanov; Karina Razumovskaya
- Country of origin: Russia
- Original languages: Russian, English
- No. of seasons: 2
- No. of episodes: 32

Production
- Producers: Alexander Tsekalo; Ruslan Sorokin; Peter Anurov
- Running time: 50 minutes
- Production companies: Kinoslovo, commissioned by Sreda

Original release
- Network: Channel One Russia
- Release: 5 November 2012 – 18 March 2018

Related
- Life on Mars (British TV series); Life on Mars (American TV series); La chica de ayer; Svět pod hlavou

The Dark Side of the Moon (Russian: Обратная сторона Луны, romanized: Obratnaya storona Luny) is a Russian detective television series, based on the BBC series Life on Mars. Like the original series it was adapted from, although with the original script rewritten to better fit the Soviet era, the series combines elements of the genres speculative fiction and police procedural, featuring a present-day police captain from the Moscow City Police (played by Pavel Derevyanko) who wakes up in 1979 as his deceased father in the days of the Soviet Union after being hit by a motorist while in pursuit of a criminal in 2011. The title is a reference to the Pink Floyd album of the same name, owing to Pink Floyd's underground popularity in 1970s Russia.

The show was produced by Sreda for broadcast on Channel One Russia, first airing on 5 November 2012. It was later renewed for a second season, which aired on 5 December 2016.

== Plot ==
In 2011, Mikhail Soloviev Jr. (Pavel Derevyanko) is a captain of the Moscow City Police, who for three years, has been on the hunt of a violent maniac known as 'Red', responsible for the murders of young women around the capital. In the ensuing operation to arrest 'Red', however, Soloviev's partner is killed, and he is hit by a motorist while chasing him. However, he then wakes up in hospital in the body of his father, Mikhail Soloviev Sr., a captain of the Moscow Municipal Militsiya in 1979.

Mikhail is unsure whether he is dreaming while in a coma, if he has gone insane, or if he really has travelled back in time. However, with his comatose body still in 2011, he can occasionally hear the conversations that his relatives, colleagues, and the doctors caring for have from the present day. He is forced to adapt the alien environment of Moscow in the days of the Soviet Union, and as a Soviet policeman, he must resume his job of solving crimes as before, and above all else, he must figure out exactly why he went back to 1979 as his father and how he can return home to 2011 as himself again.

== Awards ==
2013 — 3 prizes of the Association of Film and Television Producers in the nominations:

- «Best TV Miniseries (5-16 episodes)»,
- «Best Director's Work» (Aleksander Kott),
- «Best Actor in a Television Movie/Series» (Pavel Derevyanko).
