= La chica de ayer (TV series) =

Spanish television series

- Title card
- Genre: Time travel; Police procedural
- Based on: Life on Mars by: Matthew Graham; Tony Jordan; Ashley Pharoah
- Starring: Ernesto Alterio
- Theme music composer: Cesar Benito
- Country of origin: Spain
- Original language: Spanish
- No. of series: 1
- No. of episodes: 8

Original release
- Network: Antena 3
- Release: April 26 – June 14, 2009

Related
- Life on Mars (British); Life on Mars (American); The Dark Side of the Moon (Russian); Svět pod hlavou (Czech)

La chica de ayer (English: The girl from yesterday) is a Spanish television series which first aired on the channel Antena 3 between 26 April and 14 June 2009. A detective show, it is based on the British series Life on Mars which features a policeman suddenly transported back to 1973. The Spanish version of the show is set four years later, in 1977, and takes its name from the Spanish song "La Chica de Ayer" by Nacha Pop in a similar manner to the British version which was named after the David Bowie song "Life on Mars?". It features Ernesto Alterio in the role of Samuel Santos, a modern-day police officer who finds himself in 1977 post-Franco Spain under the command of Quin Gallardo (Antonio Garrido), a tough old-school policeman contemptuous of his modern methods.

The show was not renewed for a second season. The producers made two versions of the season finale and aired the one written to wrap up the series if it did not continue.

== Episode list ==
1. "Regreso al pasado" ("Back to the past")
2. "La mujer del vestido rojo" ("The woman in the red dress")
3. "Llega el inspector Quintana" ("Inspector Quintana arrives")
4. "El padre de Samuel, en peligro" ("The father of Samuel, in danger")
5. "Vicente, el travestido" ("Vincent, the transvestite")
6. "El caso de las feministas" ("The case of the feminists")
7. "El abandono" ("Abandonment")
8. "La luz al final del túnel" ("The light at the end of the tunnel")
