= Astral Projection (band) =

Israeli electronic musical group

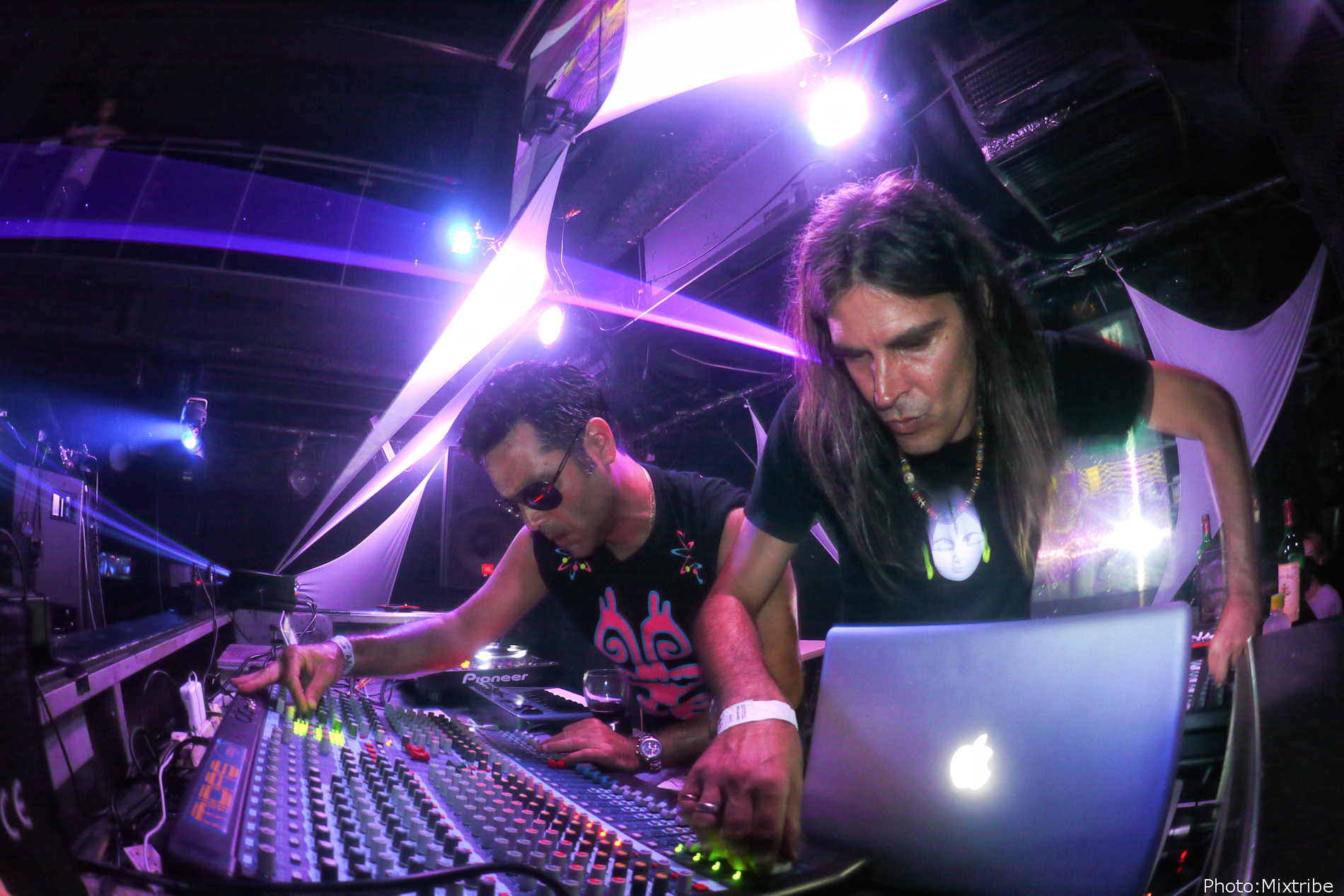

Background information
- Origin: Tel Aviv, Israel
- Genres: Goa trance Psychedelic trance
- Years active: 1993–present
- Labels: Trust in Trance Records, Phonokol, TIP Records, Transient Records
- Members: Avi Nissim; Lior Perlmutter
- Past members: Yaniv Haviv; Guy Sebbag
- Website: www.astral-projection.com

Astral Projection is an Israeli electronic musical group, producing psychedelic trance and Goa trance music. Its current members are Avi Nissim and Lior Perlmutter. Although the majority of their releases have been done through their own record company, Trust in Trance Records (which later merged with Phonokol), they have also released records with other labels including Transient. In addition to an extensive discography, the group has an extensive worldwide touring schedule.

Astral Projection's most well known tracks include hits such as "Kabalah", "People Can Fly", "Mahadeva" and "Dancing Galaxy".

== History ==
A precursor to Astral Projection, 'SFX' (abbreviation of 'sound effects'), was formed in Israel in 1989 and originally consisted of Avi Nissim and Lior Perlmutter. They released a hit single in 1991 named "Monster Mania", which prompted them to start working on an album. Work was halted when they decided to travel to New York City and try their luck there. While Avi soon went back home, Lior stayed in the United States and in 1992 released the single "JBIE". In 1993, with Lior still in the US, Avi teamed up with Yaniv Haviv and Guy Sabbag and they released the single "Another World". In early 1994, Lior returned to Israel to work on his own material, with the rest of the members under their new label Trust in Trance Records. Their album Trust in Trance 2 reached number two on Israel best selling album chart. After this release, Guy decided to leave the group and the remaining members eventually changed their name to Astral Projection. In 1995, they opened their own professional sound studio.

They have produced nine albums, some of them reaching positions on best selling album charts abroad. The most recent album is Ten which was released in 2004. They have released several singles since then.

Astral Projection's tracks "Open Society", "The Prophecy", "One" and "Strange World" were greeted enthusiastically by Goa and psychedelic trance fans. The release of their EP Open Society was pushed back first from January 2008 to 2010. Astral Projection's website attributed this to a dispute with B.N.E., the label which they originally had agreed to release the album. The EP was finally released by Trust in Trance Records on 7 September 2010.

On 10 February 2010, the New Astral Store opened on Astral Projection's website, making virtually all of their music available for a download fee in MP3 or WAV format.

Their EP, One, was released 12 June 2012 on TIP Records.

In December 2014 they released Goa Classics Remixed, an album containing reworks of other classic Goa trance artists' tracks.

In November 2023, following the Supernova Sukkot Gathering attack—where Astral Projection was originally scheduled to perform—the duo played live sets for Israel Defense Forces (IDF) troops during the Israel–Hamas war, which sparked debate within the international electronic music community.

In September 2025 they released For All Mankind.

== Discography ==
- The Unreleased Tracks (1989–1994) (as SFX)
- Trust in Trance 1 (1994)
- Trust in Trance 2 (1995)
- Trust in Trance 3 (1996)
- The Astral Files (1996)
- Dancing Galaxy (1997)
- Trust In Trance - The Next Millennium (1998)
- Another World (1999)
- In the Mix (2000)
- Unmixed Vinyl (unofficial) (2000)
- Amen (2002)
- Ten (2004)
- Back To Galaxy (2005)
- The Blissdom EP (11th Anniversary Limited Edition) (2010)
- Open Society EP (2010)
- One EP (2012) (TIP Records)
- Goa Classic Remixed (2014) (TIP Records)
- Let There Be Light EP (2017) (Suntrip Records)
- Trust In Trance (Astral Projection Remix) (by Vini Vici) (Iboga Records)
- For All Mankind (2025) (Iboga Records)
