= Trust in Trance Records =

- Founded: 1993
- Founder: Avi Nissim, Yaniv Haviv and Guy Sabbag
- Distributor: Phonokol Records
- Genre: Israeli style Psychedelic Trance
- Country of origin: Israel

Trust in Trance Records is a record label started by Avi Nissim, Yaniv Haviv, Guy Sabbag and Lior Perlmutter in 1994.

The label was formed under the name Outmosphere Records late in 1993. It was founded by Avi Nissim, Lior Perlmutter, Yaniv Haviv (SFX and later Astral Projection) and Guy Sabbag. They are pioneers of Israeli style Psychedelic Trance.

After the success of the first compilation album Trust In Trance in February 1994, they decided to change the label's name to Trust In Trance. Later that year, Guy Sabbag left the label. Avi, Lior and Yaniv created the album Trust In Trance 2 with the 3 super hits: Mahadeva, Power Gen & Innovation. The label is now defunct.

== Compilations in cooperation with Phonokol ==
- Goa Vibes
- Psychedelic Vibes
- Israel's Psychedelic Trance
- Trust In Trance

== Releases from ==
- MFG
- Power Source
- Mystica
- Xerox
- Shidapu
- Nada
- Domestic
- The Passenger
- Children of the Doc

== Released albums ==
- Various - Back To Galaxy
- Various - Goa Vibes Vol. 1
- Various - Goa Vibes Vol. 2
- Various - Trust in Trance 3
- Various - Goa Vibes Vol. 3
- Various - Israel's Psychedelic Trance
- Astral Projection - The Astral Files
- Various - Psychedelic Vibes
- Various - Psychedelic Vibes 2
- Various - Israel's Psychedelic Trance Vol. 2
- Astral Projection - Dancing Galaxy
- Various - Psychedelic Vibes 3
- Various - Psychedelic Vibes 4
- Various - Eternal Trance
- SFX - The Unreleased Tracks 89-94
- Various - Israel's Psychedelic Trance Vol. 3
- Various - Psychedelic Vibes 5
- Astral Projection - Another World
- Various - The Next Millennium
- Various - Psychedelic Vibes 6
- Various - Israel's Psychedelic Trance Vol. 4
- Various - Psychedelic Vibes 7

== See also ==
- List of record labels
