= Life on Mars (American TV series) =

2008 American television fantasy drama series

- Genre: Time travel; Science fiction; Police procedural
- Based on: Life on Mars by: Matthew Graham; Tony Jordan; Ashley Pharoah
- Developed by: Josh Appelbaum; André Nemec; Scott Rosenberg
- Starring: Jason O'Mara; Harvey Keitel; Jonathan Murphy; Michael Imperioli; Gretchen Mol
- Composer: Peter Nashel
- Countries of origin: United States; United Kingdom
- Original language: English
- No. of seasons: 1
- No. of episodes: 17

Production
- Executive producers: Josh Appelbaum; Andre Nemec; Scott Rosenberg; Jane Featherstone; Stephen Garrett
- Producer: Jane Raab
- Running time: 43 minutes
- Production companies: Space Floor Television; Kudos Film and Television; ABC Studios; 20th Century Fox Television

Original release
- Network: ABC
- Release: October 9, 2008 – April 1, 2009

Related
- Life on Mars (British TV series); La Chica de Ayer; The Dark Side of the Moon; Life on Mars (South Korean TV series); Svět pod hlavou

Life on Mars is an American crime drama television series which originally aired on ABC from October 9, 2008, to April 1, 2009. It is an adaptation of the original British series of the same title produced for the BBC. The series was co-produced by Kudos Film and Television, 20th Century Fox Television, and ABC Studios.

The series tells the story of New York City police detective Sam Tyler (played by Jason O'Mara), who, after being struck by a car in 2008, regains consciousness in 1973. Fringing between multiple genres, including thriller, science fiction and police procedural, the series remained ambiguous regarding its central plot, with the character himself unsure about his situation. The series also starred Harvey Keitel, Jonathan Murphy, Michael Imperioli, and Gretchen Mol.

Life on Mars garnered critical praise for its premise, acting, and depiction of the 1970s. Shortly after its premiere, the show's momentum was interrupted by a two-month hiatus followed by a timeslot change which led to a decline in viewership. On March 2, 2009, ABC decided not to order a second season. A DVD set of the complete series was released on September 29, 2009.

== Synopsis ==
The protagonist of the series is Detective Sam Tyler, assigned to the 125th Precinct Detective Squad of the New York City Police Department.

At the show's outset in 2008, he lives with his girlfriend who is also his NYPD assigned partner, Detective Maya Daniels. Maya, to Tyler's horror, is kidnapped by a murderer they are investigating. While responding to a radio call as he crosses the street, Tyler is distracted and hit by another responding speeding police car. He regains consciousness in the same spot in the year 1973, dressed in period civilian attire, carrying a period-accurate identity card with his badge, and equipped with a vintage automobile, a 1968 Chevrolet Camaro — and, astonishingly, he is parked within sight of the Twin Towers of the World Trade Center. He returns to his precinct house to find an unfamiliar early-1970s police squad, with contemporaneous equipment — rotary dial telephones, reel-to-reel tape recorders, typewriters — and culture which he likens to finding himself on a different planet. However, the detectives have been expecting him, thinking that he is a transfer from a place called "Hyde". His disorientation and frequent references to things from the future brand him as eccentric and he is labeled with the nickname "Spaceman", but he becomes a valued member of the squad.

Later on in the series, with Sam supposedly in a coma in 2008, Maya decides to end the relationship.

Several of the show's plots involve Sam looking into earlier versions of his cases from 2008, such as in "Out Here in the Fields" where he discovers the sociopath mentor of a future serial killer, and in "The Simple Secret of the Note in Us All" where Sam has the opportunity to stop a serial killer early in his career. Additional storylines are driven by the conflict between Sam's 2008 values and the more corrupt, almost vigilante-style policing of the era he finds himself in, while others are driven by Sam's discovery of more personal information about his past in this era that radically reshapes his understanding of the life he has left behind. He engages in an ongoing struggle to figure out what has happened to him, torn between his developing relationships in 1973 and his desire to return to 2008.

His 2008 reality frequently intrudes into 1973 through surreal, anachronistic visions and cryptic telephone calls. In one episode he sees a man in a nightclub wearing a Nirvana t-shirt, in several early episodes he sees the face of George W. Bush on the front page of the newspaper, and he frequently sees Mars rover robots following him or attempting to enter his body.

At other times, he also hints at his knowledge of the future to his colleagues; in a discussion of then-President Richard Nixon he confuses them by asserting that Nixon won't be in office much longer, he makes a veiled allusion to the September 11 attacks when advising them against engaging in hate speech, and he uses then-future cultural references as undercover pseudonyms — sometimes giving his name as "Luke Skywalker", "Tom Cruise," or "Sam Bono", and giving Gene and a female companion the undercover names "George and Laura Bush".

At the end of the series, it is revealed that Tyler's 2008 and 1973 realities were both fictitious, created by the onboard computer of a spacecraft that is carrying Tyler, Hunt, Norris, Carling, and Skelton on the first-ever human mission to the planet Mars, in 2035. The crew he worked with in 1973 were just virtual reality versions of his fellow spaceship crew members. His room number, "2B", is his sleeping unit; his old precinct, "Hyde", and his new precinct, the "125", are based on the name of the spacecraft — "Hyde 125"; his neighbor, Windy, is the name of the computer A.I.; Frank Morgan, an FBI agent in the series, is the Mission Control flight director; and in a reversal from her struggle to be taken seriously as a police officer in 1973, Annie Norris is the ship's commander. To sustain the crew, their minds were routinely kept active while asleep using virtual reality "neural stimulation" programs of their own choosing, but Sam's choice of a scenario where he was a police officer c. 2008 was abruptly changed to a 1973 setting by a computer glitch induced by a meteor-storm. The identity of Maya in 2035, however, is left unexplained. In a twist, Gene Hunt in 1973 turns out to be astronaut "Major Tom" Tyler — Sam's father — in the conclusion. Just as Maria was estranged from Gene in 1973, Sam was estranged from his father until the very end of the series, when he reconciles with his dad before they step out onto the bare ground of the Red Planet. However, the final shot shows not an astronaut boot, but Gene Hunt's signature white loafer taking the first step onto the Martian surface, casting doubt once again onto the ending.

== Cast ==
=== Main ===
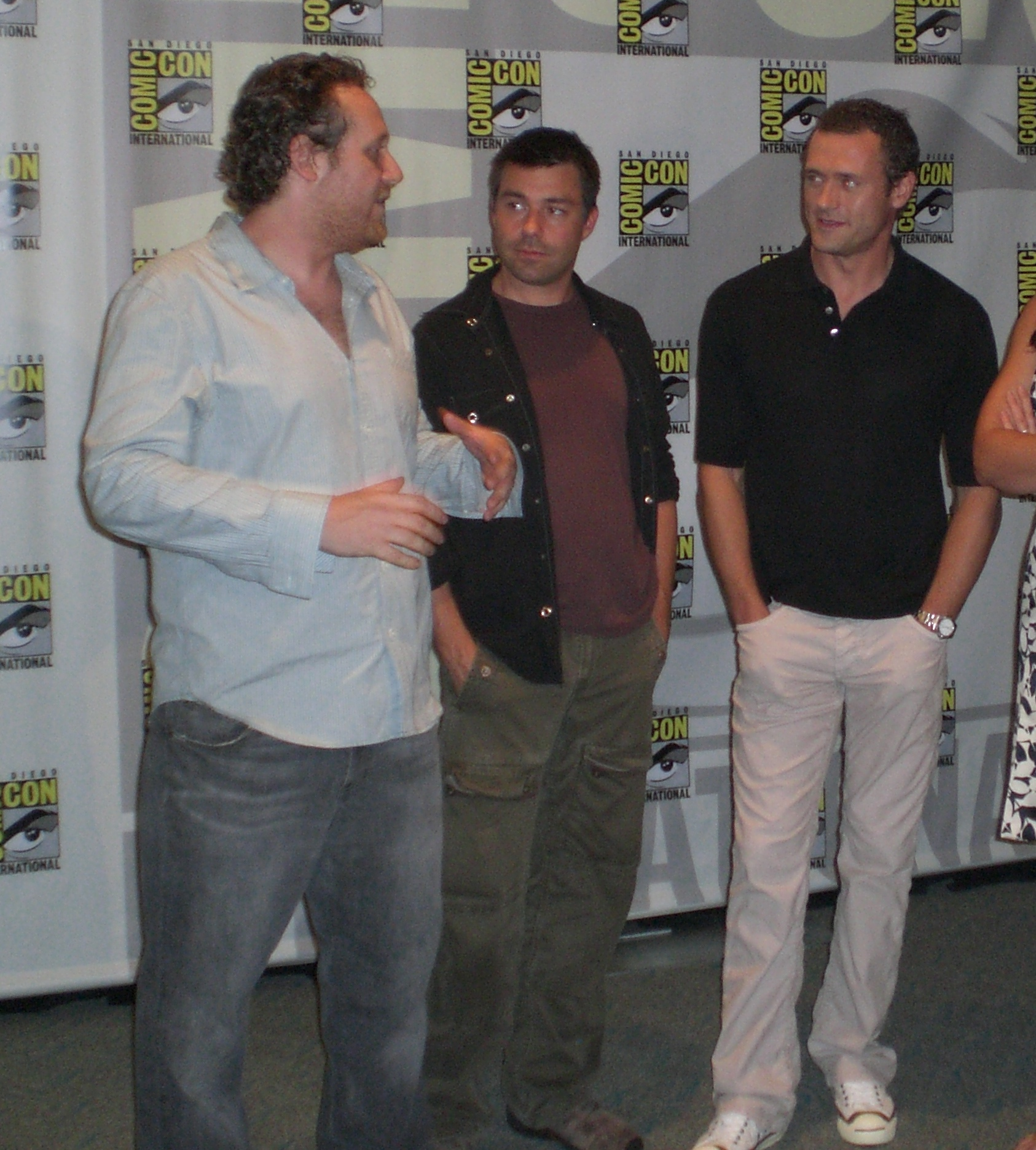
Producers Josh Appelbaum (left) and André Nemec (center) talk with actor Jason O'Mara (right), at Comic Con.

- Jason O'Mara as Sam Tyler, who is struck by a car in 2008 and awakes in 1973, often finding his modern values conflicting with 1973 culture.
- Michael Imperioli as Ray Carling, an ambitious and short-tempered detective.
- Gretchen Mol as Annie Norris, a policewoman who has aspirations of making the detective squad and struggles against sexist attitudes about policewomen in the 70s.
- Jonathan Murphy as Chris Skelton, a kind but naïve junior detective.
- Harvey Keitel as Gene Hunt, the hardened commander of the detectives.

=== Recurring ===
- Maggie Siff as Maria Hunt Belanger, a social worker who assists when a young child is a witness to a crime. She is romantically involved with Sam for a brief time during the series, and turns out to be Gene Hunt's daughter.
- John Cenatiempo as Sizable Ted, a fellow detective known for his strong physical appearance.
- Tanya Fischer as Windy, a free-spirited hippie neighbor of Sam's.
- Lisa Bonet as Maya Daniels, Sam's professional and personal partner in 2008.
- Jennifer Ferrin as Rose Tyler, Sam's mother who struggles to make ends meet.
- Dean Winters as Vic Tyler, Sam's father in 1973.
- Edi Gathegi/Clarke Peters as Fletcher Bellow, a young African-American detective.
- Peter Gerety as Franklin Morgan, an agent set to Sam's precinct when one of Sam's missions fails.
- Michael Bertolini as Colin Raimes, a suspected serial killer.
- Peter Greene as Jimmy McManus, an Irish gang leader in New York.

== Production ==
David E. Kelley was the initial writer and executive producer of the series pilot, but later handed over production responsibilities to others. The executive producers of the show were Josh Appelbaum, André Nemec, and Scott Rosenberg, the producers of the ABC drama October Road.

After reviewing the pilot episode, ABC ordered an overhaul. Several members of the cast and crew were replaced, with production moved from Los Angeles to New York to allow producers to take advantage of recently enacted local and state tax credits for shows filmed in that state. The setting of the series was also changed from Los Angeles to New York, taking place at the fictional 125th precinct of the New York City Police Department (NYPD).

The script was rewritten, with permission of the original creators, to remove the "unsatisfying" ambiguity of Sam's story in favor of a "mythological element" and "deeper mystery".

The series premiered in North America on October 9, 2008, on ABC, following Grey's Anatomy. Internationally, it also aired on Global in Canada, on FX in the UK, and on Network Ten in Australia. On November 20, 2008, ABC ordered four additional episodes to the show's original thirteen episodes. After its winter hiatus, the series was shifted to a Wednesday night timeslot on January 28, 2009, following Lost.

On March 2, 2009, it was announced that ABC would not be ordering a second season. The cancellation decision came early enough to allow producers time to wrap up the show's storyline. The network aired all 17 episodes ordered, with the final episode airing April 1, 2009.

== Episodes ==
No.	Title	Directed by	Written by	Original release date	Production code
1	"Out Here in the Fields"	Gary Fleder	Josh Appelbaum & André Nemec & Scott Rosenberg	October 9, 2008	1ANY01
After an accident, NYPD detective Sam Tyler inexplicably finds himself back in 1973, where he must help solve a murder that is eerily similar to a case he was investigating in 2008. (Closely follows the plot of Series 1 Episode 1 of UK original)
2	"The Real Adventures of the Unreal Sam Tyler"	Michael Katleman	Bryan Oh	October 16, 2008	1ANY02
Sam is in 1973. 2008 only exists as flashes of Sam's memory, assisted by a mysterious robot. A suspect in a series of deadly armed robberies of check cashing stores, Trent, is picked up but let loose for lack of evidence. Trent then attempts another robbery, is killed by Hunt, but not before Trent shoots June the precinct secretary, at the scene. When a witness states that Trent was escorted by uniformed police going into the store being robbed, it becomes a corruption issue. It turns out June was connected to Trent, and this is how the case gets solved. (Contains elements of Series 1 Episode 2 of UK original)
3	"My Maharishi Is Bigger Than Your Maharishi"	Michael Pressman	Tracy McMillan	October 23, 2008	1ANY03
When a decorated Vietnam War vet is beaten to death, Sam's precinct is pushed to the brink to find his killers, but not everyone may be happy with the results they find. (Contains elements of Series 1 Episode 5 of UK original)
4	"Have You Seen Your Mother, Baby, Standing in the Shadows?"	Alex Zakrzewski	David Wilcox	October 30, 2008	1ANY04
Sam arrests a man for accosting his mother, only to find out he's a loan shark and she owes him a thousand dollars. When his mother doesn't want to prosecute, she, unknowingly, leads Sam to fall out with Annie. (Contains elements of Series 1 Episode 4 of UK original)
5	"Things to Do in New York When You Think You're Dead"	Michael Katleman	Sonny Postiglione	November 6, 2008	1ANY05
Sam partners up with Fletcher, his future police mentor, in 1973 to find a Puerto Rican man accused of throwing a black girl off the roof of a building — a case that has the black community up in arms and demanding retribution. Guest stars Whoopi Goldberg. (Contains elements of Series 2 Episode 2 of UK original)
6	"Tuesday's Dead"	Daniel Minahan	Adele Lim	November 13, 2008	1ANY06
After a wild birthday party for Ray at the precinct house, Sam receives a phone call from his mother saying he has until two o'clock to pull out of his coma before the doctor will pull the plug, just as Lt. Hunt walks in with news of a hostage situation at a local hospital, they have until two o'clock before the man claims he will kill the hostage. Sam believes he must intervene to save his own life in 2008 and vows that no one will die today. (Contains elements of Series 1 Episode 6 of UK original)
7	"The Man Who Sold the World"	Darnell Martin	Meredith Averill & Phil M. Rosenberg	November 20, 2008	1ANY07
While investigating a child's kidnapping, Sam discovers some disturbing information about his father, as well as the real reason he disappeared for good on the day of Sam's fourth birthday party. (Contains elements of Series 1 Episode 8 of UK original)
8	"Take a Look At the Lawmen"	Brad Turner	Sonny Postiglione & David Wilcox	January 28, 2009	1ANY11
A long standing competition between Lt. Hunt and Anthony Nunzio of the 144th precinct, heats up as both investigate a bank robbery by the Russian mob. Meanwhile, Sam has a liaison in the file room, unaware of the woman (Maggie Siff)'s true identity. This episode was originally broadcast before "The Dark Side of the Mook." (Contains elements of Series 2 Episode 5 of UK original)
9	"The Dark Side of the Mook"	Rick Rosenthal	Bryan Oh & Tracy McMillan	February 4, 2009	1ANY08
A mysterious phone call from a tipster leads Det. Sam Tyler to a headless body. A severed head is delivered to the precinct at the same time, thus leading to the discovery of a series of gruesome decapitations that might involve Det. Carling's brother, Eddie. The detectives are interviewed by someone tied to Aries Project. (Contains elements of Series 1 Episode 3 of UK original)
10	"Let All the Children Boogie"	Michael Katleman	Phil M. Rosenberg	February 11, 2009	1ANY12
When rock star Sebastian Grace (Cheyenne Jackson) receives a death threat, Sam and Chris are sent to provide him with police protection. Chris later accompanies Sebastian and one of his groupies, Rocket Girl, to wait for UFOs in the New Jersey Meadowlands, but Sebastian is arrested for murder when Rocket Girl disappears. Sam also has to try and cover up his fling with Maria before Gene figures out who his partner in the file room was.
11	"Home Is Where You Hang Your Holster"	David M. Barrett	Meredith Averill	February 18, 2009	1ANY13
A city councilman who is arrested and brought into the 125th on prostitution charges privately reveals to Sam that he's from 2009 and knows the way home, but he is murdered in the middle of the precinct house before Sam can find out the secret. Hunt locks down the squad house to investigate the murder. Ray and Annie were both out of the house at the time and are sent out to investigate leads on the outside, but squabble over how much authority a policewoman should be given in investigating a crime. (Contains elements of Series 1 Episode 7 of UK original)
12	"The Simple Secret of the Note in Us All"	Jean de Segonzac	Becky Hartman Edwards & Adele Lim	February 25, 2009	1ANY10
The squad tries to solve the murder of newspaper columnist Joey Conway. After learning that Conway had visited a gallery owned by Tony Crane, a man whom Sam has arrested in the 2000s for a very similar crime, Sam becomes an advocate for the 1973-style vigilante policing he's usually fighting against, while the media glare has Hunt uncharacteristically insistent on a strictly by-the-book investigation. The rest of the precinct believe the murderer is a restaurant owner whose business was failing because of a bad review in Conway's column. Note: This is the last episode to air before the show's cancellation. (Contains elements of Series 2 Episode 1 of UK original)
13	"Revenge of Broken Jaw"	Stephen Kay	David Wilcox & Meredith Averill	March 4, 2009	1ANY09
While the squad tries to find a place to watch the Muhammad Ali-Ken Norton rematch, student radicals from the Weather Underground target the police with bomb threats, and it becomes all too personal to Lt. Hunt, who loses several close friends in the incendiary aftermath. As the investigation heats up, Sam, Annie and Hunt uncover mysterious connections to one of the students and a political science professor. The bomb threats continue as Hunt, suspiciously secretive, attempts to discover the professor's possible connection to the Weather Underground's dead leader; is the motivation politics or revenge, and do the Weathermen have the right target? With the 1-2-5 walking a dangerous tightrope to discover the target of the next bomb, the case takes a totally unforeseen but deadly turn. (Contains elements of Series 2 Episode 3 of UK original and Series 1 Episode 8 of "Ashes to Ashes")
14	"Coffee, Tea, or Annie"	David Petrarca	Adele Lim & Bryan Oh	March 11, 2009	1ANY14
When a Pan Atlantic air hostess turns up dead, Annie volunteers for a dangerous undercover mission posing as the murdered woman to help solve the second in a possible series of brutal homicides. Then, after an unlikely suspect is uncovered, an invitation to a lurid swingers' party leads to an evening full of sensational surprises — not just for Annie and Sam (who attend as a couple) but Lieutenant Hunt also, who arrives with a special guest to mix it up. Juicy sexual escapades bring the swingers' party to a fever pitch, but will the murderer be revealed? Finally, Annie confronts Hunt with the courage of her convictions about her future at the 1-2-5. (Contains elements of Series 2 Episode 4 of UK original)
15	"All the Young Dudes"	Darnell Martin	Sonny Postiglione & Tracy McMillan	March 18, 2009	1ANY15
When Sam poses as a streetwise tough to infiltrate a vicious New York City gang led by Irishman Jimmy McManus who is suspected of truck hijackings, he’s pushed to the limit not to blow his cover, and he reveals a much darker side. A bare-knuckled fist fight with a gang member, a late-night deal to buy a truckload of stolen VCRs and even time behind bars at his own precinct are all necessary elements of Sam’s scam. But can he keep up the ruse when he’s told to shoot a bound-and-gagged woman? And his attraction to McManus' sister also seems to be part of a recipe for disaster. Jason O'Mara's real life wife, Paige Turco, plays his romantic interest. (Contains elements of Series 2 Episode 8 of UK original)
16	"Everyone Knows It's Windy"	Alex Zakrzewski	Mike Flynn	March 25, 2009	1ANY16
Following Irish gangster Jimmy McManus' shooting of Ray and Chris, crime fighting gets extremely personal at the 125th Precinct. When McManus is subsequently murdered outside a neighborhood bar and FBI agent Franklin Morgan is sent to the precinct, both sides of the law suspect Sam of murder, leaving him to question his own innocence. With the evidence stacking up against him, Sam must rely on his friends at the precinct to bend the rules as he tenaciously searches for the real killer. (Contains elements of Series 2 Episode 7 of UK original)
17	"Life Is a Rock"	Michael Katleman	Scott Rosenberg	April 1, 2009	1ANY17
Sam wakes up after dreaming about his 2008 apartment with 1973 characters and is told by his hippie neighbor Windy that he's most likely closer to going back; later on a mysterious caller offers Sam a chance to return to 2008; all he needs to do is complete three tasks, but a confusing set of circumstances inside and out of the 1-2-5 makes him think twice about whether he even wants to go back. Sam commits suicide in 2008 so he can permanently return to 1973, but awakens in 2035, remembering that he is an astronaut who was being fed simulations to better emerge from suspended animation, during a spaceflight to Mars. His fellow awakening astronauts were characters in the simulations.

== Reception ==
=== Commentary ===
In a British interview with SFX, Matthew Graham—co-creator of the original Life on Mars—was asked his opinion on the ending of the American remake. His opinion was "Have you seen it? It beggars belief, doesn't it?" He goes on to speak of how he discussed future Ashes to Ashes endings and theories with the American team, stating they thought the British ending "wasn't extreme enough". He spoke of how strong endings should be there for the viewer to work out, whereas the American ending was like "coming up with something and going 'Hey-hey, you never knew this, but Gene is a Martian!'", which he felt was a mistake.

=== U.S. ratings ===
#	Episode	Rating	Share	Rating/Share (18–49)	Viewers (millions)	Rank (night)	Rank (week)	Air date (m/d/y)
1	"Out Here in the Fields"	8.2	14	3.8/10	11.33	#3	#15 (tied)	10/9/2008
2	"The Real Adventures of the Unreal Sam Tyler"	5.7	10	2.7/7	8.47	#8	TBD	10/16/2008
3	"My Maharishi is Bigger Than Your Maharishi"	TBD	9	2.5/7	8.06	#11	TBD	10/23/2008
4	"Have You Seen Your Mother, Baby, Standing In the Shadows?"	5.7	10	2.7/8	8.41	#8	TBD	10/30/2008
5	"Things to Do in New York When You Think You're Dead"	6.0	10	3.0/8	9.62	#8	TBD	11/6/2008
6	"Tuesday's Dead"	6.0	10	2.9/8	8.94	#8	TBD	11/13/2008
7	"The Man Who Sold the World"	5.3	9	2.6/7	7.97	#9	TBD	11/20/2008
8	"Take a Look at the Lawmen"	4.0	7	2.3/6	8.89	#7	TBD	1/28/2009
9	"The Dark Side of the Moon"	3.7	6	2.3/5	6.02	#5	TBD	2/4/2009
10	"Let All the Children Boogie"	3.0	5	2.0/6	5.14	TBD	TBD	2/11/2009
11	"Home is Where You Hang Your Holster"	3.5	6	2.1/6	5.78	#7	TBD	2/18/2009
12	"The Simple Secret of The Note In Us All"	3.2	5	2.0/6	5.55	#8	TBD	2/25/2009
13	"Revenge of Broken Jaw"	3.5	6	2.1/6	5.66	#6	TBD	3/4/2009
14	"Coffee, Tea, or Annie"	3.0	4	1.5/4	4.58	#13	TBD	3/11/2009
15	"All the Young Dudes"	3.3	6	2.0/6	5.27	#11	TBD	3/18/2009
16	"Everyone Knows It's Windy"	3.5	6	2.1/6	5.67	#8	TBD	3/25/2009
17	"Life Is a Rock"	3.6	6	2.1/6	5.86	#7	TBD	4/1/2009
