= Svět pod hlavou =

Czech mystery television series

- Also known as: World under Head; Shadow of the Ferns
- Genre: Drama; Mystery; Psychological
- Written by: Ondřej Štindl; Robert Geisler; Benjamin Tuček
- Directed by: Marek Najbrt; Radim Špaček
- Starring: Václav Neužil; Ivan Trojan
- Country of origin: Czech Republic
- Original language: Czech
- No. of seasons: 1
- No. of episodes: 10

Production
- Producer: Vratislav Šlajer
- Running time: 52 minutes
- Production company: Bionaut

Original release
- Network: ČT1, TV JOJ
- Release: January 2 – March 6, 2017

Related
- Life on Mars (British); Life on Mars (American); The Girl from Yesterday (Spain); The Dark Side of the Moon (Russia); Life on Mars (South Korea)

Svět pod hlavou (English: World under Head, also known as Shadow of the Ferns) is a Czech mystery television series. The series is heavily inspired by the BBC television series Life on Mars.

The name of the series comes from the lyrics of the song V stínu kapradiny by singer Jana Kratochvílová. The series budget was 100 million koruna.

== Plot ==
The series starts in 2016. Elite policeman Filip Marvan is forced to steal evidence to protect his brother who owes money to a mob. Filip is hit by a car the same day, and wakes up in a hospital in 1982. He has to find out why he is in the past and what circumstances changed the life of his family.

He discovers that his identity is still Filip Marvan, but that he is not a member of the police, but of the National Security Service. Martin Plachý, a local "boisterous tough guy" introduces him into his new service. Plachý eventually turns out to be the only cop "with character" in an almost spineless department of party members and meritorious workers, who often put the desired conclusions above the actual investigation.

Marvan gets to know his commander Major Špalek, slightly more or less incomprehensible Slávek Brousek or party cadre Klement Kratěna. Relatively soon he gets in touch with his parents - mother who is daughter of the director in the cultural center and father who is a member of problematic subculture called "máničky". They only gradually realize that they are expecting a child, Filip. Filip cannot come to terms with unresolved family relationships and unanswered questions for a long time. His father hanged himself for no apparent reason when he Filip was ten years old while his mother had to raise him alone. Slovak doctor Kristýna Čáslavová becomes Filip's guide. Filip has a strong friendship with Čáslavová that grows into love.

The more Filip realizes why he is in a coma, from which he is unable to wake up, the more he is in danger. He realizes that lion's share on his father's suicide has Klement Kratěna who put him and his friends in prison. More dangerous than Kratěna is the official Šejba and his son, the chairman of SSM "Šejbič". Šejbič is the mobster, because of whom Filip found himself in coma. Filip realizes that he must find a key that will bring him out of the coma. He recognizes that it is not enough for him to deal with his family's past, but that he must also find a viable relationship with his own present. The plot thus gradates into one big trap that the StB opens over Filip and from which there is almost no escape. There is also the motif of the psychiatric hospital from which Filip manages to escape. Filip then crosses state border his guide to the "world under his head" Martin Plachý is seriously shot but during the attempt. Filip lies down in the leaves behind the iron curtain and wakes up from the coma in present. Based on what he experienced, he solves his original case, understands the context of his life, and reconciles with his brother. He also discovers that the one who helped him the most - Martin Plachý - was a real person and was innocently executed for Slávek's murder and "espionage".

== Cast and characters ==
- Václav Neužil as Filip Marvan. Filip is a police officer working in an organised crime unit, the protagonist of the series. After being hit by a car, he wakes up in 1982 as member of Czechoslovak National Security Corps. As the part of the unit, he investigates crimes, during which he meets his own parents before he was even born. The character is inspired by Sam Tyler.
- Ivan Trojan as Martin Plachý. Cynical member of National Security Corps. He becomes Filip's partner and friend. He is this series' version of Gene Hunt.
- Judit Bárdos as Kristýna Čáslavová. A doctor at a local hospital. She feels disappointed about the times she lives in, but does her best for her patients. She becomes Filip's love interest.
- Jan Budař as Klement Kratěna. Assiduous, unscrupulous member of National Security Corps who targets Filip's father as "problematic youth." The main antagonist of the series.
- Václav Kopta as Alois Špalek. Filip's superior. Henpecked by his wife.
- Tomáš Jeřábek as Slávek Brousek. A somewhat dim-witted member of the State Security Service who's good at beating the suspects.
- Kryštof Hádek as Jan Marvan. Filip's father.
- Marie Doležalová as Simona Marvanová. Filip's mother.

== Episodes ==
No.	Title	Directed by	Written by	Original release date	Czech viewers (millions)	Slovak viewers (share 12–54)
1	"Stín kapradiny"	Marek Najbrt	Ondřej Štindl	January 2, 2017	1.647	14.6%
2	"Anděl odplaty"	Marek Najbrt	Ondřej Štindl	January 9, 2017	1.25	5.0%
3	"Mrtvý lidi"	Radim Špaček	Ondřej Štindl	January 16, 2017	0.926	4.0%
4	"Orchidej na smetišti"	Radim Špaček	Robert Geisler	January 23, 2017	1.043	4.0%
5	"Závadová mládež"	Marek Najbrt	Ondřej Štindl	January 30, 2017	0.950	N/A
6	"Dvojboj"	Marek Najbrt	Ondřej Štindl	February 6, 2017	0.903	4.0%
7	"Smrt špiona"	Radim Špaček	Ondřej Štindl and Benjamin Tuček	February 13, 2017	0.918	4.0%
8	"Rodinná záležitost"	Radim Špaček	Hynek Schneider	February 20, 2017	0.937	4.0%
9	"Mrtvý muž"	Radim Špaček	Hynek Schneider	February 27, 2017	0.897	5.0%
10	"1983"	Radim Špaček	Hynek Schneider	March 6, 2017	1.022	5.0%

== Production ==
Svět pod hlavou was a co-production between Czech Television and TV JOJ. It is the first series coproduced by TV JOJ. Creators of the series stated that while is inspired by British TV series Life on Mars the story itself and the setting of the series is unique. It was directed by Marek Najbrt (6 episodes) and Radim Špaček (4 episodes). The series was filmed in the North and Central Bohemia regions.

== Reception ==
The series has received mostly positive reviews after the first episodes aired.

The series has won Czech Lion Award for the best dramatic television series in 2017.
