= Life on Mars (British TV series) =

British television fantasy drama series (2006–2007)

- Genre: Time travel; Science fiction; Supernatural drama; Period drama; Police procedural
- Created by: Matthew Graham; Tony Jordan; Ashley Pharoah
- Starring: John Simm; Philip Glenister; Liz White; Dean Andrews; Marshall Lancaster
- Country of origin: United Kingdom
- Original language: English
- No. of series: 2
- No. of episodes: 16 (list of episodes)

Production
- Running time: 60 minutes
- Production companies: Kudos; BBC Wales

Original release
- Network: BBC One; BBC Four (2 episodes)
- Release: 9 January 2006 – 10 April 2007

Related
- Ashes to Ashes; Life on Mars (American TV series); Life on Mars (South Korean TV series)

Life on Mars is a British television series broadcast on BBC One between 9 January 2006 and 10 April 2007. It follows Sam Tyler (John Simm), a Manchester police officer in 2006 who wakes up after a car accident to discover that he has time-travelled to 1973, where he works the same job in the same location under the command of Detective Chief Inspector Gene Hunt (Philip Glenister) while attempting to solve the mystery of what has happened to him.

Life on Mars (named after David Bowie's song of the same name) and its sequel, Ashes to Ashes (also named after a David Bowie song), received acclaim for blending elements of mystery, police procedurals, supernatural drama, science fiction, and historical drama. It won two International Emmy Awards for Best Drama Series. An American adaptation was produced by ABC and ran for one season from October 2008 to April 2009, a Spanish adaptation was broadcast from April to June 2009, a Russian adaptation was broadcast in November 2012, a Czech adaptation was broadcast from January to March 2017, a South Korean adaptation began broadcasting in June 2018, and a Chinese adaptation was announced in 2019.

== Plot ==
Life on Mars follows Sam Tyler, a policeman in service with the Greater Manchester Police (GMP). After being hit by a car in 2006, Sam mysteriously awakens in 1973; he finds himself working for the predecessor of the GMP, the Manchester and Salford Police, at the same location as in 2006. Early on in the series, it becomes apparent to Sam that he has awakened as a Detective Inspector, one rank lower than his 2006 rank of Detective Chief Inspector. As part of the Criminal Investigation Department, Sam finds himself working under the command of DCI Gene Hunt. The plot is based on the ambiguity of Sam's predicament as neither the audience nor the character can be sure whether he has died, fallen into a coma, or legitimately travelled in time.

== Production ==
The programme was conceived in 1998, when screenwriters Matthew Graham and Ashley Pharoah were sent on a break to Blackpool by Kudos to think of show ideas. Originally titled Ford Granada after the 1970s car, the series was rejected by the BBC. In response, Graham stated "Back then, broadcasters just weren't comfortable with something like that, something that wasn't set in the real world and that had a fantasy element to it." According to Graham, the initial idea was for a humorous, pre-watershed programme that overtly mocked the styles and attitudes of the 1970s, with the comic actor Neil Morrissey envisaged as the central character.

Later, Channel 4 drama executive John Yorke substantially redeveloped the original script, focusing on a double act between Sam Tyler and Gene Hunt. Senior management eventually decided not to pursue the idea, with Graham telling the Radio Times that the reaction to the idea was "it's going to be silly". The series eventually attracted the attention of BBC Wales's Julie Gardner, who persuaded BBC Head of Drama Jane Tranter to commission the programme from BBC Wales for BBC One. John Yorke left Channel 4 to rejoin the BBC and, together with Julie Gardner, acted as joint commissioning editor on the show for its entire run.

The programme's central character Sam Tyler was originally to have been named Sam Williams, but Kudos felt this not to be striking enough and requested Graham devise an alternative surname. Graham asked his young daughter for her opinion and she suggested Tyler for the character's surname. He later discovered that his daughter had named the character after the Doctor Who character Rose Tyler. Gene Hunt's surname came from actor Gareth Hunt. The initial geographical setting was to be London, which was changed to Leeds and finally to Manchester, as part of a BBC initiative to make more programmes in the city. The name Sam Williams was subsequently used as a plot point in the second season.

The second season had a distinctive style of introduction on BBC One: after a brief collage of momentary images, such as several test cards and comedy writer and broadcaster Barry Took, a mock-up version of BBC1's 1970s blue-on-black rotating globe ident was used, although the design had to be modified to fit widescreen sets. This was accompanied by a bass-voiced continuity announcer in the style of that era. Viewers in Wales saw an original 'BBC Cymru Wales' mechanical globe with introductions provided by former BBC Wales announcers. Trailers for the show also used the 1970s style, including the rhombus-style BBC logo.

On 9 October 2006, it was confirmed that the second season of Life on Mars would be the last. Matthew Graham stated: "We decided that Sam's journey should have a finite life span and a clear-cut ending and we feel that we have now reached that point after two series". Graham's claim that two endings had been filmed was later revealed to be a ruse.

=== Music ===
The programme's soundtrack features mainly early 1970s songs as well as an original score of the theme music as part of the title sequence composed by Edmund Butt. The show's title is in reference to the David Bowie song "Life on Mars?", which plays on an iPod in Sam's car while he is run over, and on an 8-track tape in a Rover P6 when he awakes in 1973; it is used again at the climax of the final episode, and fleeting moments of the song are periodically used throughout the third season of the programme's sequel, Ashes to Ashes, to allude to Sam Tyler's fate.

Matthew Graham stated that initially there were some concerns over whether the production team would be able to license the song, which, had they been denied, would have necessitated retitling the series. Another Bowie song, "Space Oddity", is used in BBC trailers advertising the series. In several episodes, Gene Hunt adopts the name "Gene Genie", in reference to yet another Bowie song, "The Jean Genie", used in the fourth episode. Another Bowie track, "Changes", is played over the closing credits of the second series finale.

The show's creators were initially refused permission to use "Live and Let Die" by Paul McCartney and Wings but, according to Graham in the Radio Times, "We sent the episode directly to Paul McCartney. Almost immediately, his assistant phoned back and said, 'Paul loves it. You can go ahead and use it'".

Life on Mars

Soundtrack album by Various artists
- Released: 19 February 2007
- Label: Sony BMG Music Entertainment
- Producer: Kudos Film and Television in association with Monastic Productions

Life on Mars chronology
Life on Mars (2007)	Ashes to Ashes (Original Soundtrack) (2008)

A soundtrack CD was released in 2007.

=== Music used ===
Series	Episode	Band	Song
1	1	Blue Öyster Cult	"Stairway to the Stars"
1	1	David Bowie	"Life on Mars"
1	1	Deep Purple	"Fireball"
1	1	Deep Purple	"Rat Bat Blue"
1	1	Lou Reed	"I'm So Free"
1	1	The Move	"Feel Too Good"
1	1	Sweet	"Little Willy"
1	1	The Who	"Baba O'Riley"
1	1	Cream	"White Room"
1	1	Uriah Heep	"Easy Livin'"
1	1	Uriah Heep	"Look at Yourself"
1	2	Hawkwind	"You Shouldn't Do That"
1	2	Lee "Scratch" Perry and The Upsetters	"Jungle Lion"
1	2	Paul McCartney and Wings	"Live and Let Die"
1	2	Deep Purple	"No One Came"
1	2	Deep Purple	"Lazy"
1	2	Pink Floyd	"One of These Days"
1	2	Status Quo	"Junior's Wailing"
1	2	Thin Lizzy	"Saga of the Ageing Orphan"
1	3	Free	"Wishing Well"
1	3	Sweet	"The Ballroom Blitz"
1	3	Uriah Heep	"Gypsy"
1	4	Atomic Rooster	"Head in the Sky"
1	4	David Bowie	"The Jean Genie"
1	4	Frankie Miller	"I Can't Change It"
1	4	Jethro Tull	"Cross-Eyed Mary"
1	4	Roger Whittaker	"I Don't Believe in If Anymore"
1	4	Hawkwind	"Silver Machine"
1	4	Slade	"Gudbuy T' Jane"
1	4	Sweet	"Block Buster!"
1	4	Hawkwind	"Brainstorm"
1	4	The Rolling Stones	"Wild Horses"
1	5	Cream	"White Room"
1	5	Nina Simone	"I Wish I Knew How It Would Feel to Be Free"
1	5	Roxy Music	"Mother of Pearl"
1	5	Roxy Music	"Would You Believe?"
1	5	T. Rex	"Jeepster"
1	5	Thin Lizzy	"Call the Police"
1	5	Thin Lizzy	"The Rocker"
1	6	Louis Armstrong	"What a Wonderful World"
1	7	Britney Spears	"Toxic"
1	7	Nina Simone	"Sinner Man"
1	7	Peters and Lee	"Welcome Home"
1	7	Pulp	"Disco 2000"
1	8	Atomic Rooster	"Save Me"
1	8	Atomic Rooster	"Devil's Answer"
1	8	Free	"Little Bit of Love"
1	8	John Kongos	"Tokoloshe Man"
1	8	David Bowie	"Life on Mars?"
1	8	Lindisfarne	"Meet Me on the Corner"
1	8	Wizzard	"See My Baby Jive"
2	1	David Bowie	"Starman"
2	1	Roxy Music	"Street Life"
2	1	The Three Degrees	"Everybody Gets to Go to the Moon" (live version)
2	1	The Three Degrees	"Year of Decision" (live version)
2	2	Elton John	"Goodbye Yellow Brick Road"
2	2	Mungo Jerry	"In the Summertime"
2	2	The Hollies	"Long Cool Woman in a Black Dress"
2	3	Barclay James Harvest	"When the City Sleeps"
2	3	David Cassidy	"How Can I Be Sure"
2	3	Sweet	"Hell Raiser"
2	4	David Bowie	"Aladdin Sane"
2	4	The Strawbs	"Lay Down"
2	4	Gilbert O'Sullivan	"Alone Again (Naturally)"
2	4	Roxy Music	"Just Like You"
2	4	Santana	"Samba Pa Ti"
2	4	Slade	"Coz I Luv You"
2	4	T. Rex	"Rock On"
2	4	The Moody Blues	"The Story in Your Eyes"
2	5	Roxy Music	"Just Like You"
2	5	Electric Light Orchestra	"10538 Overture"
2	5	Hawkwind	"You Shouldn't Do That"
2	6	Ananda Shankar	"Snow Flower"
2	6	Audience	"I Had a Dream"
2	6	Cozy Powell	"Dance with the Devil"
2	6	Elton John	"Rocket Man"
2	6	Shocking Blue	"Hot sand"
2	6	Thin Lizzy	"Whiskey in the Jar"
2	6	Uriah Heep	"Traveller in Time"
2	7	Faces	"Cindy Incidentally"
2	7	Sweet	"Done Me Wrong All Right"
2	7	Mott the Hoople	"One of the Boys"
2	7	Sweet	"Rock & Roll Disgrace"
2	8	Atomic Rooster	"Decision/Indecision"
2	8	David Bowie	"Changes"
2	8	David Bowie	"Life on Mars?"
2	8	Elton John	"Funeral for a Friend/Love Lies Bleeding"
2	8	Israel Kamakawiwoʻole	"Somewhere over the Rainbow/What a Wonderful World"
2	8	Mott the Hoople	"One of the Boys"
2	8	Tom Waits	"I Hope That I Don't Fall in Love with You"

== Episodes ==
Eight one-hour episodes of Life on Mars were broadcast weekly on Monday nights at 9:00 pm by the BBC. The series episodes were mostly written by its creators Jordan, Graham and Pharoah, later joined by Chris Chibnall as the fourth writer for the first series. For the second series, Graham, Pharoah and Chibnall returned to write episodes, joined by Julie Rutterford, Guy Jenkin and Mark Greig.

The second series was broadcast weekly at the same time as the first but on Tuesdays. According to Jane Featherstone, the show's executive producer, speaking in February 2006, a film version of the show was also a possibility: "Life on Mars was a very high concept idea and there was no doubt it would work on the big screen".

Just nine months after its debut, the repeat rights for Life on Mars were purchased by (now-defunct) UK pay TV channel Bravo, where it was the centrepiece for a new drama strand.

=== International ===
The original version also was broadcast in Canada from September 2006 to April 2007 on BBC Canada, and from 8 January 2008 to 23 April 2008 on Télé-Québec in French and Showcase in English.

In New Zealand the original series was broadcast on TV One from February 2007, being described as "sensationally well-made" by an NZ website. Series two was broadcast from June 2008, with the final screening on 4 August 2008.

In Australia the original British version was broadcast on ABC1 from 20 May 2007, with the second following during February 2008. The US version broadcast on 5 February 2009 on Network Ten.

In the Republic of Ireland RTÉ Two broadcast the series from June 2007 in a late evening slot, following RTÉ News on Two.

The first series of the original Life on Mars was broadcast in the United States on BBC America from July 2006 to August 2007 and was broadcast in 2010 on some public television stations, with the second series being broadcast from December 2007 to January 2008. Acorn Media released both series on DVD in 2008.

The show has also been transmitted in Croatia (Croatian Radiotelevision), Sweden (a cut version on SVT 2), Netherlands (Nederland 3), in Germany (Kabel 1), Greece (Skai TV), Spain (Antena.neox), Israel (Hot), Italy (Rai Due), Japan, Serbia (B92), Norway (NRK) and Estonia (ERR). Sub began broadcasting Life on Mars in Finland in April 2008, and ATV World started broadcasting the show in Hong Kong on 13 July 2008, France (13ème Rue). In Hungary (Duna TV) Life on Mars started in March 2011. French-German broadcaster Arte also aired the series in 2023.

== Characters ==
The main characters of Life on Mars, from left: DC Chris Skelton, DCI Gene Hunt, DI Sam Tyler, DS Ray Carling and WPC/DC Annie Cartwright

The methodology and techniques of modern policing that Sam Tyler employs during Life on Mars lead him into clashes with other characters. Gene Hunt and the rest of the CID appear to favour brutality and corruption to secure convictions, as shown by their willingness to physically coerce confessions and fabricate evidence. In both series, Tyler clashes with Hunt the most frequently, usually because Tyler values forensic evidence whereas Hunt often resorts to traditional methods and gut instincts. In one episode during Series 1, in which doubt is cast on several suspects, Hunt insists that "the first to speak is guilty" and frequently refers to the 'Gene Genie'.

Sam describes Hunt as an "overweight, over-the-hill, nicotine-stained, borderline alcoholic homophobe with a superiority complex and an unhealthy obsession with male bonding", to which Hunt responds, "You make that sound like a bad thing". Hunt is supported by his fiercely loyal subordinates, Chris Skelton and Ray Carling, with the latter portrayed as a character similar to Hunt. Ray and Sam often disagree with each other and Sam and Gene have a love-hate relationship. Chris, in contrast, becomes friendly with Sam and respects his modern methods, finding his loyalty torn between Gene and Sam.

Given Sam's predicament, he avoids revealing his suspicion that he may have travelled back in time, for fear that others will think he is insane. The only person in 1973 to whom Sam fully reveals his story is Annie Cartwright. According to Liz White, the actress who played Cartwright, "She gets very tired of his constant talk about how this situation is not real, that they are all figments of his imagination — she can only explain it as psychological trauma from his car crash".

== Themes and storyline ==
The Test Card Girl, a surreal hallucination repeatedly encountered by Sam Tyler

After the premiere, each of the remaining fifteen episodes begins with a short teaser before a monologue in which Sam repeats, as part of the moving imagery of the title sequence:

My name is Sam Tyler. I had an accident and I woke up in 1973. Am I mad, in a coma, or back in time? Whatever's happened, it's like I've landed on a different planet. Now, maybe if I can work out the reason, I can get home.

This questioning is a central plot device throughout the series, displaying both the character's and the audience's uncertainty about what has happened.

Throughout the course of Life on Mars, Sam's uncertainty is reinforced by frequent paranormal phenomena, such as hearing voices and seeing images from 2006 on radios, telephones, and televisions. The voices discuss his medical condition, leading him to partially believe that he is in a coma. Other elements suggest to him that he is insane, such as his frequent and unexpected encounters with the Test Card Girl from Test Card F, who speaks directly to him. Annie Cartwright partially persuades Sam that he is truly in 1973, arguing that his mind would be unable to fabricate the amount of detail and tangibility in the world where he finds himself, evidence that he is in fact in 1973.

Sam's uncertain situation is not the focal point of most episodes, remaining a sub-plot. In most episodes, the main plot centres on a particular crime or case relating to the police, such as drug trafficking, a hostage situation, murders and robberies. For this reason, most episodes follow a conventional police drama format. As the series progresses, Sam focuses on how he will get home in almost every episode.

A recurring motif throughout the series is the overlapping of the past and present. For example, during Series 1: Episode 6 Sam hears the voice of his mother in 2006, telling him his life-support will be switched off at 2:00 pm. At the same time he is called into a hostage-taking situation, where the perpetrator states that he will kill his victims at precisely the same hour. Sam also encounters as their younger selves people whom he knows in the future, including suspects, friends, his own parents, and himself as a child.

Sam comes from an era in which suspects' rights and the preservation of forensic evidence are stringently observed. His background leads Sam into conflict, as other characters exhibit openly sexist, homophobic, and racist behaviour, and often indulge all these prejudices while carrying out their police duties.

The series frequently makes use of Gene Hunt's comical rudeness in the form of jokes and dramatic irony about a future which the audience already knows, but which the characters in 1973 do not. For example, in Series 1: Episode 5, Hunt declares, "There will never be a woman prime minister as long as I have a hole in my arse." However, in line with the ambivalence of the Hunt character, the irony is qualified by the fact that, in the real 1973, Margaret Thatcher herself told the BBC's Valerie Singleton in an interview, "I don't think there will be a woman Prime Minister in my lifetime." The clip of this remark had often been replayed on British TV and the audience would be familiar with it.

Another theme in the show is Sam's confusion about police work in 1973, as he often mistakenly mentions techniques and technologies that were not used in 1973, such as two-way mirrors. One such theme is that Sam continually gives criminals the updated version of the right to silence warning, which was changed in 1994. When he does so, someone around him usually points out that he is giving the warning incorrectly.

=== Finale ===
It is revealed in the final episode that Tyler's coma had lasted so long because he had a tumour of the brain. Tyler comes to believe the tumour is embodied by Hunt, and begins to think that by bringing Hunt down, his own body can recover. To this end, Tyler begins to collaborate with Frank Morgan (Ralph Brown) to bring Hunt down. While Hunt and the team are engaged in a firefight with armed robbers, Sam returns to 2006. He eventually comes to realise that he has become used to, and enjoys, the 1970s, seeing it as his "real world". In an attempt to get back to 1973 to save Annie and the rest of the team from death, Sam leaps off the roof of the police station, arriving back in 1973 and saving the team, promising never to leave them again. Writer Matthew Graham wrote the scene to indicate that Sam is now in the afterlife, but acknowledged that the ending is ambiguous and open to other interpretations, such as lead actor John Simm's belief that Sam may not have returned to the present. One way this could work is that Sam is actually the Hyde detective that Frank Morgan says he is, who had an accident on the way to Manchester. The doctor treating Sam in the future is the same as Frank Morgan, but Sam couldn't have seen him in the future since he's in a coma. The only way they could be the same is if the Frank Morgan in 1973 is the real one, and Sam is hallucinating the future doctor.

In the final scene, the team drive off, with Sam and Gene bickering as usual. Children run past, including the girl from Test Card F who symbolizes the death that has been stalking Sam since the beginning. She looks directly into the camera before reaching out and "switching off" the television the viewer is watching, signifying that Sam's life has come to an end.

The first episode of sequel series Ashes to Ashes shows that the protagonist, DI Alex Drake of the Metropolitan Police, has been studying Tyler's notes and 2006-era personnel file, in which his photograph is overstamped with the word "SUICIDE" – consistent with what happened in the series finale. Ashes to Ashes implies that Gene Hunt's world is in some sense real, and states that Sam lived on in that world, during which time he married Annie but had no children.

In the final episode of "Ashes to Ashes" a fuller explanation for Sam Tyler's experience is provided, when the role of Gene Hunt in both Life on Mars and Ashes to Ashes is revealed.

=== Depiction of 1973 ===
Life on Mars is a 1970s retro series.

During an interview John Stalker, Deputy Chief Constable of Greater Manchester in the early 1980s and himself a Detective Inspector in 1973, has stated that the depiction of the police "has got nothing to do with real policing in the 1970s. It could not be more inaccurate in terms of procedure, the way they talk or the way they dress. In all the time I was in the CID in the 1970s I never saw a copper in a leather bomber jacket and I never heard an officer call anyone 'guv'. ... Actually, there were a few police officers in London who started to behave like Regan and Carter in The Sweeney, but that was a case of life following art, not the other way round". The journalist who interviewed Stalker, Ray King, remarks that the depiction of the police can be defended if we assume that Sam is indeed in a coma and that we are seeing his imaginary idea of 1973, filtered through 1970s police shows.

Upon Sam Tyler awaking in 1973, he finds himself on a building site, beneath a large advertising board, proclaiming the construction of a new motorway, the Mancunian Way. In reality, construction of Mancunian Way was completed in 1967. According to Matthew Graham, writing in the Radio Times, the error was deliberate. "We knew that this road was built in the 1960s, but we took a bit of artistic licence". Minor historical anachronisms such as this are present throughout Life on Mars. Some, as above, were made out of artistic licence whilst others were deliberately inserted to confuse the issue of whether Sam Tyler was in a coma, mad or really back in time. Many inaccuracies were visible such as modern street furniture, cable television cabinets, satellite television dishes, CCTV cameras, LCD digital watches and double-glazed uPVC window frames, which were all unintentional. During DVD commentaries for the series, the programme makers acknowledge these as errors but also point out they are perfectly feasible, given Sam's situation. As the popularity of the series grew, the hunting of such anachronisms became a favourite pastime among Life on Mars fans.

The brown Ford Cortina used by Gene throughout both of the seasons was a 1974 model, which makes it anachronistic. In production, three different cars were used.

=== Cultural references ===
Hyde, a town to the east of Manchester, is used as Sam's former police division as a clue that his 1973 self is an alter ego, as in Robert Louis Stevenson's The Strange Case of Dr Jekyll and Mr Hyde.

== Reception ==
=== Critical reception ===
Critical reaction to the first series of Life on Mars was extremely positive. Steve O'Brien, writing for SFX, declared "It looks like BBC One has ... a monster hit on its hands ... It's funny ... and dramatic and exciting, and we're really not getting paid for saying this". Alison Graham, television editor for the Radio Times, described the series as "a genuinely innovative and imaginative take on an old genre". James Walton of The Daily Telegraph commented "Theoretically, this should add up to a right old mess. In practice, it makes for a thumpingly enjoyable piece of television — not least because everybody involved was obviously having such a great time". Sam Wollaston of The Guardian wrote: "Life on Mars was more than just a jolly, tongue-in-cheek romp into the past ... Once there, in 1973, we find ourselves immersed in a reasonably gripping police drama — yes, The Sweeney, perhaps, with better production values ... Or put another — undeniably laboured — way, as poor Sam Tyler walks through his sunken dream, I'm hooked to the silver screen". Critical reaction remained generally positive throughout the programme's run. Of the second series, Alison Graham believed that "Sam Tyler and Gene Hunt are shaping up nicely as one of the great TV detective partnerships ... It's vastly enjoyable and manages to stay just about believable thanks to some strong writing and, of course, the two marvellous central performances".

Nancy Banks-Smith, in The Guardian, felt that the time-paradox aspect of the programme had become somewhat confusing. Banks-Smith summed up the programme's success as "an inspired take on the usual formula of Gruff Copper of the old school, who solves cases by examining the entrails of a chicken, and Sensitive Sidekick, who has a degree in detection".

Two days after the final episode's transmission, Life on Mars was attacked in the British press by the National Association of Schoolmasters/Union of Women Teachers (better known as NASUWT), who claimed that Gene Hunt's use of homophobic insults in the programme could encourage copycat bullying in schools. The BBC stated that Life on Mars was targeted at an adult audience, and argued that Hunt's characterisation was "extreme and tongue-in-cheek".

In 2019, The Guardian ranked it 99th in the top 100 TV shows of the 21st century.

=== Ratings ===
Life on Mars was a ratings success. The first series achieved an average audience figure of 6.8 million viewers and regularly won its timeslot, despite competition from ITV1's own comedy-drama series Northern Lights, which launched the following week and proved to itself be a popular show. The first series's finale (the first time since the first episode, when its ITV1 rival was Soapstar Superstar, that it was not competing against Northern Lights) gained 7.1 million viewers and a 28% audience share.

Viewing figures for the second series were initially low, with the first episode only attracting 5.7 million viewers, slumping to 4.8 million viewers by episode three, despite being heavily trailed and publicised. These figures were blamed by The Stage on "poor scheduling and unfortunate sporting fixtures, possibly combined with high expectation". Audience figures picked up during the second series' run, however, with the final episode gaining an average of seven million viewers (a 28% audience share), despite competition from UEFA Champions League football on ITV1.

Episode Order	Viewers (millions)
8	7.10
9	5.70
11	4.80
16	7.15

=== Accolades ===
The series twice won the International Emmy Award for Best Drama Series in 2006 and 2008. In January 2007, it won the Best New Programme category as part of the Broadcast Magazine awards. In March 2007 it won two categories, Best Drama Series and the Writers' Award, at the Broadcasting Press Guild Awards.

The first series was nominated for a British Academy Television Award (BAFTA) in the Best Drama Series category. John Simm was also nominated as Best Actor for his work on the show. The programme won the audience-voted "Pioneer Award".

In October 2007, series two was nominated as the Most Popular Drama at the 2007 National Television Awards.

Year	Award	Category	Nominee(s)	Result	Ref.
2006	Banff Television Festival	Continuing Series	Life on Mars	Won	
2006	International Emmy Awards	Best Drama Series	Life on Mars	Won	
2006	TV Quick and Choice Awards	Best New Drama	Life on Mars	Nominated	
2006	Royal Television Society Craft & Design Awards	Visual Effects – Picture Enhancement	Jet Omoshebi, Pepper Post Production	Won	
2007	Broadcast Magazine Awards	Best New Programme	Life on Mars	Won	
2007	Broadcasting Press Guild Awards	Best Drama Series	Life on Mars	Won	
2007	Broadcasting Press Guild Awards	Best Actor in a Drama Series	John Simm	Nominated	
2007	Broadcasting Press Guild Awards	Best Actor in a Drama Series	Philip Glenister	Nominated	
2007	Broadcasting Press Guild Awards	Writer's Award	Matthew Graham, Tony Jordan, Ashley Pharoah	Won	
2007	BAFTA Television Awards	Best Actor	John Simm	Nominated	
2007	BAFTA Television Awards	Best Drama Series	Life on Mars	Nominated	
2007	BAFTA Television Awards	Pioneer Award	Life on Mars	Won	
2007	BAFTA Television Craft Awards	Best Director	Bharat Nalluri for Episode 1	Nominated	
2007	BAFTA Television Craft Awards	Best Editing : Fiction/Entertainment	Barney Pilling	Nominated	
2007	BAFTA Television Craft Awards	Best Production Design	Bryan Sykes	Nominated	
2007	BAFTA Television Craft Awards	Best Sound – Fiction/Entertainment	Life on Mars Team	Nominated	
2007	BAFTA Television Craft Awards	Best Writer	Matthew Graham for Episode 1	Nominated	
2007	Edgar Allan Poe Award	Best Television Episode Screenplay	Matthew Graham for Episode 1	Won	
2007	Monte-Carlo Television Festival	Best Drama Series	Life on Mars	Nominated	
2007	Monte-Carlo Television Festival	Best Outstanding Actor – Drama Series	Dean Andrews	Nominated	
2007	Monte-Carlo Television Festival	Best Outstanding Actor – Drama Series	Philip Glenister	Nominated	
2007	Monte-Carlo Television Festival	Best Outstanding Actor – Drama Series	Marshall Lancaster	Nominated	
2007	Monte-Carlo Television Festival	Best Outstanding Actor – Drama Series	John Simm	Nominated	
2007	Monte-Carlo Television Festival	Best Outstanding Actress – Drama Series	Liz White	Nominated	
2007	National Television Awards	Most Popular Drama Series	Life on Mars	Nominated	
2007	Royal Television Society Awards	Best Drama Series	Life on Mars	Nominated	
2007	Royal Television Society Awards	Best Actor – Male	Philip Glenister	Nominated	
2007	Royal Television Society Craft & Design Awards	Production Design – Drama	Matt Gant, Brian Sykes	Nominated	
2007	Saturn Awards	Best Television Presentation	Life on Mars	Nominated	
2007	SFX Awards	Best TV Show	Life on Mars	Nominated	
2007	TV Quick and Choice Awards	Best Loved Drama	Life on Mars	Nominated	
2007	TV Quick and Choice Awards	Best Actor	Philip Glenister	Nominated	
2007	Writers' Guild of Great Britain Awards	Best Soap/Series (TV)	Life on Mars	Nominated	

== Home media ==
=== DVD ===
DVD release name	Episodes	Years of Series	UK Release Date (Region 2)	North American Release Date (Region 1)	Australian Release Date (Region 4)
Life on Mars: Series 1	1—8	2006	15 May 2006; Re-released 28 February 2011	28 July 2009	3 December 2009
Life on Mars: Series 2	9—16	2007	16 April 2007; Re-released 28 February 2011	24 November 2009	5 November 2009
Life on Mars: Series 1 & 2	1—16	2006—2007	10 September 2007; Re-released 28 February 2011	—N/a	—N/a

=== Blu-ray ===
Blu-ray release name	Episodes	Years of Series	UK Release Date (Region B)	North American Release Date (Region A)	Australian Release Date (Region B)
Life on Mars: Series 1	1–8	2006	27 October 2008	—N/a	—N/a
Life on Mars: Series 2	9–16	2007	27 October 2008	—N/a	—N/a

- Note: Due to the popularity of the show, Blu-ray editions of both series were released on 27 October 2008. However, since the show's various effects were originally edited and mastered in standard definition, a true HD version would require a near-total overhaul. The Blu-ray editions therefore contained studio-upscaled footage of the original SD content, providing some improvement. This pseudo-HD version is not known to have been broadcast on television.

== Books ==
=== Companion books ===
There have been 2 official tie-in books to accompany the series featuring episode summaries, cast and character profiles, music listings to each show, script extracts, plus behind-the-scenes content and never before seen photos.

- Thompson, Lee (2006). Life on Mars: The Official Companion. Pocket Books Publishers. ISBN 978-1-84739-005-9.
- Adams, Guy; Thompson, Lee (2007). Life on Mars: The Official Companion Volume Two. Pocket Books Publishers. ISBN 978-1-84739-039-4.

=== Humour ===
- The Rules of Modern Policing (1973 Edition) by "DCI Gene Hunt" (Bantam Press) [8 October 2007]

A parody of a police manual that made fun of the conventions of 1970s British police procedurals like The Sweeney. It also contained a glossary of British 1970s slang terms. The actual author of the text is Guy Adams.

- The Wit and Wisdom of Gene Hunt by "DC Chris Skelton and DS Ray Carling" (again, Guy Adams) (Bantam Press)

A book detailing the philosophy of Gene Hunt as told by his disciples.

=== Novels ===
On 12 March 2012, Kate Bradley, Commissioning Editor at HarperCollins, secured a deal with Kudos Film and Television to publish four brand new Life on Mars novels. The Life on Mars books were published exclusively as eBooks at roughly three-month intervals, but were successful enough to generate the release of hard copy, trade paperbacks in August 2013. The author of the series is Tom Graham, Matthew Graham's brother. (Despite earlier speculation that the brother identity was a pseudonym for another writer—based on a preponderance of misleading evidence that turned out to consist of improbably high coincidence—the by-line, and the familial relationship, are absolutely authentic.)

Content-wise, the novels begin to explore the continuity gap between Life on Mars and Ashes to Ashes, picking up approximately where the first TV series leaves off; but it is not necessary to know both series to enjoy the books. Said Tom Graham in a pre-publication interview: "…I made a very conscious decision to move on from the show, not to tinker or play around with pre-existing story lines. There is more than enough new and unused material for my books without me going back and plundering previous episodes. Also (and this is one of the realities of publishing) my books had to in some way stand apart from the show and be accessible to readers who only vaguely remember Life on Mars but haven't seen it since it was first aired. There were times I felt like Peter Jackson making The Lord of the Rings Trilogy – like him, I have to appeal to the hard core fan, the semi-fan, the part-time fan, and the casual passing punter who's never even heard of the thing. Unlike Jackson, I didn't have a half a billion dollars budget riding on it, but the principle's the same. So, I have very deliberately written books that recall the TV show, jog memories of characters and events from the show, recreate the atmosphere and ethos of the show, but don't require an in-depth knowledge of minor characters and plot points. We don't (yet) plunge into the finer details of the LoM mythology that would mystify the general reader, but if further books are commissioned, there will be plenty of room to get stuck into the minutiae!"

Though each book can stand on its own, the four are best read as a tetralogy, in order of listing below, as there is a superstructure linking them together. They are:

- Graham, Tom (2012). Blood, Bullets and Blue Stratos. HarperCollins Publishers. ISBN 978-0-00-747257-4.
- Graham, Tom (2012). A Fistful of Knuckles. HarperCollins Publishers. ISBN 978-0-00-747258-1.
- Graham, Tom (2012). Borstal Slags. HarperCollins Publishers. ISBN 978-0-00-747259-8.
- Graham, Tom (2013). Get Cartwright. HarperCollins Publishers. ISBN 978-0-00-747260-4.

(Each of the book titles is a play on a pop culture phrase or film title that is of, or relevant to, the '70s, those being Blood, Bullets and Babes, A Fistful of Dollars, Borstal Boy and Get Carter).

== Future ==
An attempt at reviving the series was made with a Christmas special set in the 1970s, but it was passed on by the BBC in 2018 for financial reasons.

In April 2020, creator Matthew Graham tweeted that a third series was planned. Set in Manchester and London during the 1970s and 1980s, the series was planned to consist of four or five episodes and was titled Lazarus, once again after the name of a David Bowie song. Simm confirmed in January 2022 that he was involved, reprising his role as Sam Tyler along with Philip Glenister as Gene Hunt. It was confirmed in June 2023 that the series had been cancelled for financial reasons.

A live table reading of the pilot script took place on Sunday 19 November 2023, at BFI Southbank, brought to life by the BFI Players. It was accompanied by a Q and A with co-writer Ashley Pharoah.

== Related ==
A sequel television series, Ashes to Ashes, was broadcast between 2008 and 2010. Ashes to Ashes is set in 1980s London, with DI Alex Drake being transported from the modern day and meeting Gene Hunt and his colleagues. Simm did not appear in the sequel series.

The show was referenced in sitcom Not Going Out – "Life on Mars Bars", Lee has a similar experience to Sam Tyler. Lee is hit by a car whilst the song "Life on Mars" plays and finds out he is in a coma. In The Catherine Tate Show – Life at Ma's was a recurring sketch with Tom Ellis as Sam Speed, a modern-day policeman who, after an accident, finds himself back in time and struggling to cope with outdated attitudes.

=== Remakes and derived shows ===
David E. Kelley produced the pilot for an US version of the series for the ABC network, though he handed duties over to others for the series production. It premiered in October 2008, and was broadcast to minor critical and public acclaim where declining numbers led to cancellation in April 2009 after 17 episodes, though with sufficient lead to allow the storyline to be concluded.

Spanish Television network Antena 3 bought the rights from the BBC and has remade the show as La Chica de Ayer (English: The Girl from Yesterday, the title taken from a 1980 pop song), set in 1977 post-Franco Spain.

The Russian broadcaster Channel One has remade the show as Обратная сторона Луны (The Dark Side of the Moon, after the Pink Floyd album of the same name). The series began on 5 November 2012, running for 16 episodes. It tells the story of Moscow police captain Mikhail Mikhailovich Solovyov (Михаил Михайлович Соловьёв), who is hit by a car in 2012 during pursuit of a suspect, and wakes up in hospital in Soviet Moscow in 1979. Soon Mikhail is released, and takes the place of his father, Mikhail Ivanovich Solovyov.

Czech national TV channel ČT1 has made a TV series heavily inspired by Life on Mars, called Czech: Svět pod hlavou (World under the head). It tells the story of an elite policeman Filip Marvan, who is hit by a car and wakes up in a hospital in 1982, in Communist Czechoslovakia. The name of the series refers to a line from a song V stínu kapradiny by Jana Kratochvílová. The first episode of the series aired on 2 January 2017, scheduled to run for 10 episodes in total.

A South Korean adaptation developed by Studio Dragon and produced by Production H for pay TV network OCN aired from 9 June to 5 August 2018.
