= Amane Ibañez =

Spanish actress, journalist and TV presenter

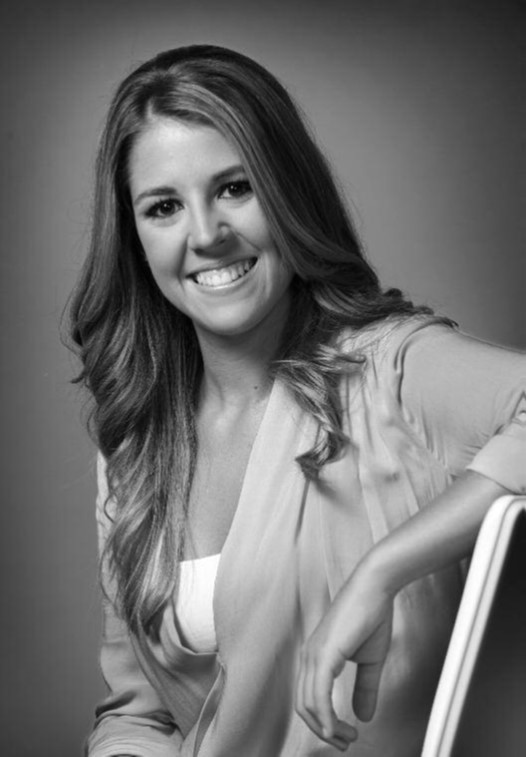
- Born: Amane Ibañez Goikoetxea; August 11, 1989 (age 36); Mungia, Spain
- Citizenship: Spain
- Education: University of Navarre
- Occupations: actress, journalist, TV presenter
- Years active: 2001–present
- Known for: Betizu
- Notable work: Betizu
- Children: 1

Amane Ibañez Goikoetxea (born August 11, 1989) is a Spanish actress, journalist and TV presenter.

She made her debut at the age of twelve in Betizu on the ETB 1 channel, being one of several Betizu artists (a former Betizu Star).

== Early life ==
Amane Ibañez was born in 1989, in Mungia, Biscay, Basque Country (Spain).

== Career ==
She started on television at the age of 11 in a singing program on ETB 1. At the age of 12-13 she appeared on the Betimu de Betizu program and later on the Betizu program. She was selected along with other members such as Jon Urbieta, Elene Arandia or Telmo Idigoras. In 2005, she was one of the protagonists of the children's film BT ispiluen jauregian (BT in the Palace of Mirrors), directed by Alberto J. Gorritiberea, along with Telmo Idígoras, Elene Arandia and Saida Rouane. She also in 2005 she voiced a character in the animated film Olentzero and the magic trunk.

From 2004 onwards she was a member of the music group Betizu Taldea, together with Zuriñe Hidalgo, Telmo Idígoras, Elene Arandia and Saida Rouane. With Betizu Taldea she released 2 albums and spent a whole year on tour giving concerts in the Basque Country, Navarra and the French Basque Country.

Between 2007 and 2008 she participated in the ETB 1 series Pilotari in the role of Itziar Gortari. She later participated in the Goenkale series. In addition to that, she was part of the cast of the movie Go! Azen in 2008 and of the series Go! Azen in the years 2009–2010 in the role of Ane.

She studied at the Ikastola Larramendi in Munguía. She later graduated in audiovisual communication at the University of Navarra (2007-2011). Between 2012 and 2014 she was a sports presenter on the Gaur Egun Kirolak program on ETB 1. She was also a presenter on different sports programs on ETB 1 and on radio programs in Euskadi Irratia (2013-2014).

During the years 2014–2015, she was a reporter for the ETB 1 program Euskal Herria Zuzenean presented by Xabier Euzkitze and a collaborator in sports talk shows on the Hamaika Telebista channel. direct and work as a news presenter. She also collaborates on the radio program Egun on Euskadi.

== Private life ==
She is the daughter of Jose Ignacio Ibañez Lopategui, mayor of Munguía between 1994 and 1999. She is married and has a son.

== Discography ==
- 2004, Bizi Bizi (with Betizu Taldea)
- 2005, Gazteok (with Betizu Taldea)

== Filmography ==
=== Television ===
- 2002, Betimu (within Betizu), ETB 1
- 2003, Betizu, ETB 1
- 2007–2008, Pelotari, ETB 1 (as Itziar Gortari)
- 2009–2010, Go!azen, ETB 1 (as Ane)
- 2022, Biba Zuek, ETB 1 (guest/interviewed)

=== Film ===
- 2005, BT ispiluen jauregian, dir. Alberto J. Gorritiberea
- 2005, Olentzero y el tronco mágico
- 2008, Go!azen, dir. Jabi Elortegi y Aitor Aranguren

== Journalism ==
=== TV programs ===
- 2012–2014, Gaur Egun Kirolak, ETB 1
- 2014–2015, Euskal Herria Zuzenean, ETB 1
- 2020, Gaur Egun, ETB 1

=== Radio ===
- 2013–2014, Euskadi Irratia
- 2014-, Egun on Euskadi, Euskadi Irratia

== See also ==
- Betizu
- Betizu Taldea
- Egin kantu!
- Nerea Alias
- Elene Arandia
