= Jon Gomez =

Spanish TV presenter

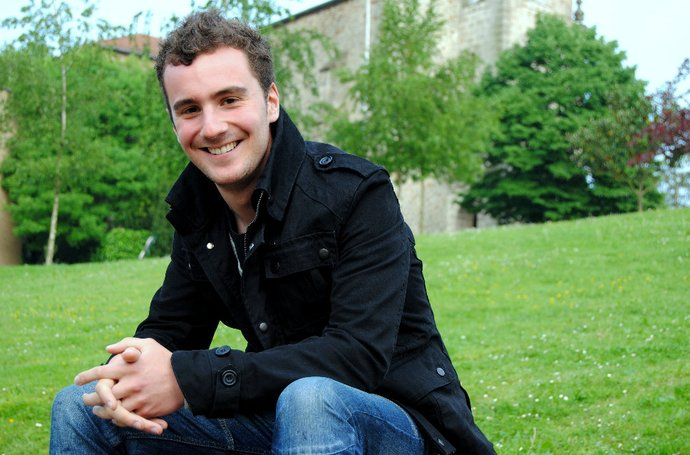
- Born: Jon Gomez Garai; May 17, 1990 (age 36); Galdakao, Spain
- Citizenship: Spain
- Education: University of the Basque Country
- Occupations: TV presenter, musician
- Years active: 2007–present
- Known for: Betizu
- Notable work: Betizu
- Television: Betizu; El conquistador del fin del mundo SexSua

Jon Gomez Garai (born May 17, 1990) is a Spanish singer, musician and TV presenter.

He made his debut at the age of nineteen in Betizu on the ETB 1 channel, being one of several Betizu artists (a former Betizu Star).

== Early life ==
Jon Gomez was born in 1990, in Galdakao, Biscay, Basque Country (Spain).

== Career ==
He studied the Bachelor's degree in journalism in the University of the Basque Country.

He began as a television presenter in 2009 on the Hamaika Telebista network in the Gaztero program. But he did not stay long, as he started working for EITB Media. At the age of nineteen, he began as a presenter of Betizu, succeeding Nerea Alias. His participation and roles in Betizu brought him acclaimed success and made him a child star in the Basque Country, becoming well known among the children and the audience.

In 2010 he was the presenter of various contests, including a national cooking contest with chef David de Jorge. In addition to that, he has also been a presenter of the famous television program El conquistador del fin del mundo in ETB 2 channel.

In 2011 he was the presenter of his own television program called IBIL2D on the ETB 1 channel, becoming the youngest presenter in the history of EITB.

Between 2015 and 2016, he was the presenter and director of the first sex education program on Basque television, SexSua.

Currently he is also a member, musician and vocalist of the Basque music group Oxabi.

== Private life ==
He lives in Bilbao.

== Filmography ==
=== Television ===
- 2009, Gaztero, Hamaika Telebista (presenter)
- 2010, Betizu, ETB 1 (presenter, actor)
- 2011, IBIL2D, ETB 1 (presenter)
- 2015, SexSUA, ETB 1 (presenter)
- 2018, El conquistador del fin del mundo, ETB 2 (presenter)

== See also ==
- Betizu
- Betizu Taldea
- Egin kantu!
- Nerea Alias
- Elene Arandia
- Jon Urbieta
