= Ixone Andreu =

Basque social worker, expert on violence against women and politician

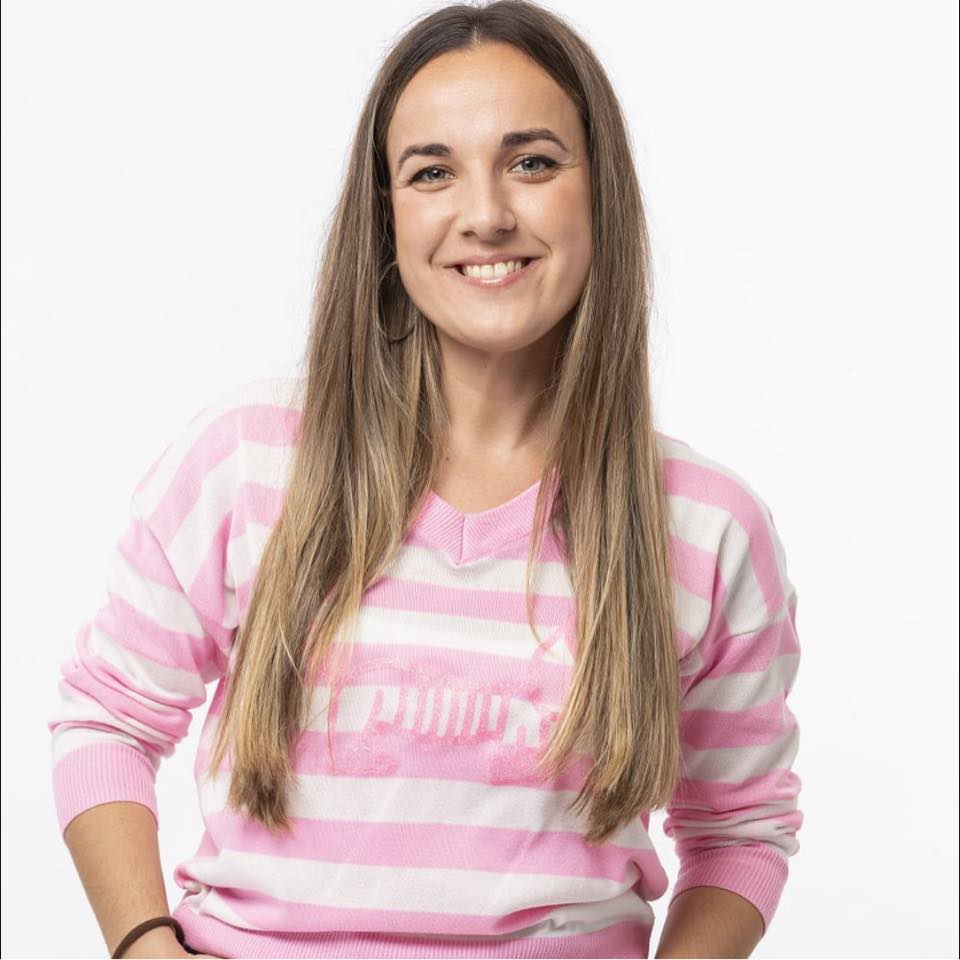
- Ixone Andreu in 2023

Delegate Councilor for Social Action and Equality of the Santurtzi Local Government
- Incumbent
- Assumed office 2023
- Appointed by: Karmele Tubilla (Mayor)

Councillor of the Santurtzi City Council
- Incumbent
- Assumed office 2023

Personal details
- Born: Ixone Andreu Egia; 18 January 1995 (age 31) Santurtzi (Basque Country); Spain
- Party: Basque Nationalist Party (EAJ-PNV)
- Other political affiliations: Euzko Gaztedi
- Education: University of Deusto (BA, MA)
- Occupation: Social worker, expert on violence against women and politician

Ixone Andreu Egia (born 18 January 1995) is a Basque social worker, expert on violence against women and politician.

She is currently a councillor of the Santurtzi City Council. In addition, she is also a member of the Local Government, as delegate councillor for Social Action and Equality, being the youngest councillor in the history of the municipality.

== Biography and career ==
Ixone Andreu was born in Santurtzi, Basque Country, on 18 January 1995. She was born into a Basque nationalist family. He studied at the Asti Leku Ikastola school in Portugalete, where he studied primary education, secondary education and the Spanish Baccalaureate.

She studied a bachelor's degree in social work at the University of Deusto (2013–2017) and also studied a bachelor's degree in social education at the University of Deusto. She later studied a master's degree in intervention in violence against women at the University of Deusto. Her final master's thesis was "The influence of sexuality and gender mandates in the construction of pornography" ("Sexualitatea eta genro mandatuen eragina pornografiaren eraikuntzan"). She has worked in different areas related to violence against women and she has also participated in different campaigns in that area such as Beldur Barik of the Basque Government, among others.

In 2006, at just eleven years old, Andreu took part as a contestant on the successful talent show Egin Kantu! from the Basque network ETB1, presented by Nerea Alias and with Joxe Mendizabal as singing coach, coinciding in the contest with, among other contestants, the actress Itxaso Gil. She reached the end of the contest and was a finalist.

== Political career ==
Since she was young she has been affiliated with the youth organization Euzko Gaztedi Indarra (EGI) and the Basque Nationalist Party (PNV). In the 2023 Spanish local elections, she was a candidate for councillor of the Santurtzi City Council on the list of the Basque Nationalist Party. She was elected councillor, becoming the youngest person to be a councillor in the history of the municipality.

In the 2023-2027 legislature, Karmele Tubilla was elected mayor of Santurtzi. Tubilla appointed Andreu as a member of the Local Government Board and delegate councillor for Social Action and Equality, succeeding Itziar Carrocera Fernández as head of this area, and becoming the youngest person to be appointed delegate councillor. At the head of the area of social action and equality, Andreu set his priority as the fight against sexist violence, improving anti-sexual assault protocols, the Women' Empowerment School, inclusion policies for the LGBT community, drug addictions plans or the inclusion of the elderly in the digital sphere.

Andreu studied at the Asti Leku Ikastola school and there she had Miren Matanzas as a teacher, and in 2023 they met again in the Santurtzi City Council, each representing a different political party. Furthermore, in the plenary session of the constitution of the Santurtzi City Council, Andreu and Miren Matanzas had to be at the age table, as they were the youngest and oldest councillors of the City Council.

== Filmography ==
=== Television ===
Year	Title	Role	TV channel	Notes	Ref.
2006-2007	Egin kantu!	Self - constestant	ETB 1	finalist	

== See also ==
- Imanol Pradales
- Santurtzi
