= Joxe Mendizabal =

Spanish musician, composer and music producer

- Born: Jose Javier Mendizabal Aldalur; 1970 (age 55–56); Amasa-Villabona, Spain
- Occupations: Musician, composer, music producer, record producer
- Years active: 1987–present
- Notable work: Betizu; Egin kantu!

Jose Javier Mendizabal Aldalur (born 1970), known as Joxe Mendizabal, is a Spanish musician, composer, music producer and record producer.

He has worked and created music for various music groups, TV shows and movies, such as Betizu Taldea, Egin kantu! (ETB 1), ¡Menuda decisión! (Cuatro), Vaya Semanita (ETB 2), Oh Happy Day (ETB 1), Goenkale, Bago!az or Hoy quiero confesar.

== Early life ==
Joxe Mendizabal was born in 1970, in Amasa-Villabona, Gipuzkoa, Basque Country (Spain).

== Career ==
In 1986, together with others, he created the Gipuzkoan folk music group Xaximiku with which he released two albums, one in 1986 and a second in 1989. Later he joined the rock group Egan, together with Xabier Saldias, with whom he gave several concerts and recorded three discs.

Medizabal plays the accordion and he defines himself as an accordionist (soinujole, in Basque). In 2012 he released his first solo album called Soinujolea naiz (I am an accordionist, in Basque), in which he claimed himself above all as an accordionist.

In the year 2000 he began working for EITB Media as a musician, composer, arranger and music producer. In 2001 he was the music producer for Betizu and later for the music group Betizu Taldea (BT) for which he composed four albums and well-known singles such as "Lokaleko leihotik", single from his third album Bizi Bizi (2004), "Esaidazu", part of his first album BT 1.0 (2002/03), "Gora Gora Betizu" or "Kolperik jo gabe".

From 2006 to 2010 he was the musical director and coach of the talent show Egin kantu! where he was also the contestants' singing coach and trained them before each performance (along with the choreographer and dancer Naiara Santacoloma who was the dance teacher).

In 2005 he composed and produced the original soundtrack for the film BT ispiluen jauregian, directed by Alberto J. Gorritiberea. He later worked as a music producer for programs such as Sorginen laratza (ETB 1), Wazemank (ETB 1), Vaya semanita (ETB 2), Euskal Kanturik Onena (ETB 1) and others. He was a member of the jury in the Oh Happy Day contest in ETB 1 channel.

In 2016 he was responsible for the musical production of the programs Bi Gira (ETB 1), Euskal Kantuen Gaua (ETB 1) and Oh Happy Day (ETB 1). He was also the musical producer of Kantugiro (ETB 1) and the talent show Bago!az (ETB 1), in the latter he was also in charge of preparing and rehearsing with the contestants as a coach (together with the choreographer and dancer Karlos Nguema who was the teacher of dance).

He has also composed songs and has led the musical production of series like Go!azen or Goenkale. He has also been the music supervisor for shows like A Ze Banda! where he directed the performances of the contestants, among others those of the Twin Melody duo, Aitana Etxeberria and Paula Etxeberria.

== Discography ==
- 1987, Xaximiku (with Xaximiku)
- 1989, Musikaren indarrean gatoz (with Xaximiku)
- 1990, Erromerian (with Egan)
- 1991, Nahasea (with Egan)
- 1995, Egan berria (with Egan)
- 2012, Soinujolea naiz (solo album)

== Filmography ==
=== Films ===
- 2005, BT ispiluen jauregian, dir. Alberto J. Gorritiberea (original soundtrack)
- 2013, Hoy quiero confesar, dir. Manu Aguilar (with Elena Irureta in the cast)

=== Stage ===
- 2017, El tipo de la tumba de al lado (with Aitziber Garmendia and Iker Galartza in the cast)

=== Television ===
- 2001–2004, Betizu, ETB 1
- 2009–2011, Vaya Semanita, ETB 2
- 2006–2010, Egin kantu!, ETB 1 (vocal coach of the program)
- 2007–2010, ¡Menuda decisión!, Cuatro
- 2008–2010, Oh Happy Day, ETB 1 (program jury member)
- 2011–2013, Goenkale, ETB 1
- 2010–2011, Kerman, ETB 1
- 2014-2014, A Ze Banda!, ETB 1
- 2015–2017, Kantugiro, ETB 1
- 2017–2019, Bago!az, ETB 1 (vocal coach of the program)
- 2017–2022, Go!azen, ETB 1
- 2018–2020, Errepide Galduak, ETB 1

== See also ==
- Betizu
- Betizu Taldea
- Egin kantu!
