= Maialen =

Maialen is a Basque feminine given name, equivalent to English Madeleine or Magdalene. Notable people with the name include:

- Maialen Axpe (born 1993), Spanish pole vaulter
- Maialen Chourraut (born 1983), Spanish slalom canoeist
- Maialen Diez (born 1995), Spanish singer and musician
- Maialen García (born 1990), Spanish field hockey player
- Maialen Lujanbio (born 1976), Spanish Basque poet
- Maialen Zelaia (born 1988), Spanish footballer
