= Ane Negueruela =

Basque singer, musician and physician

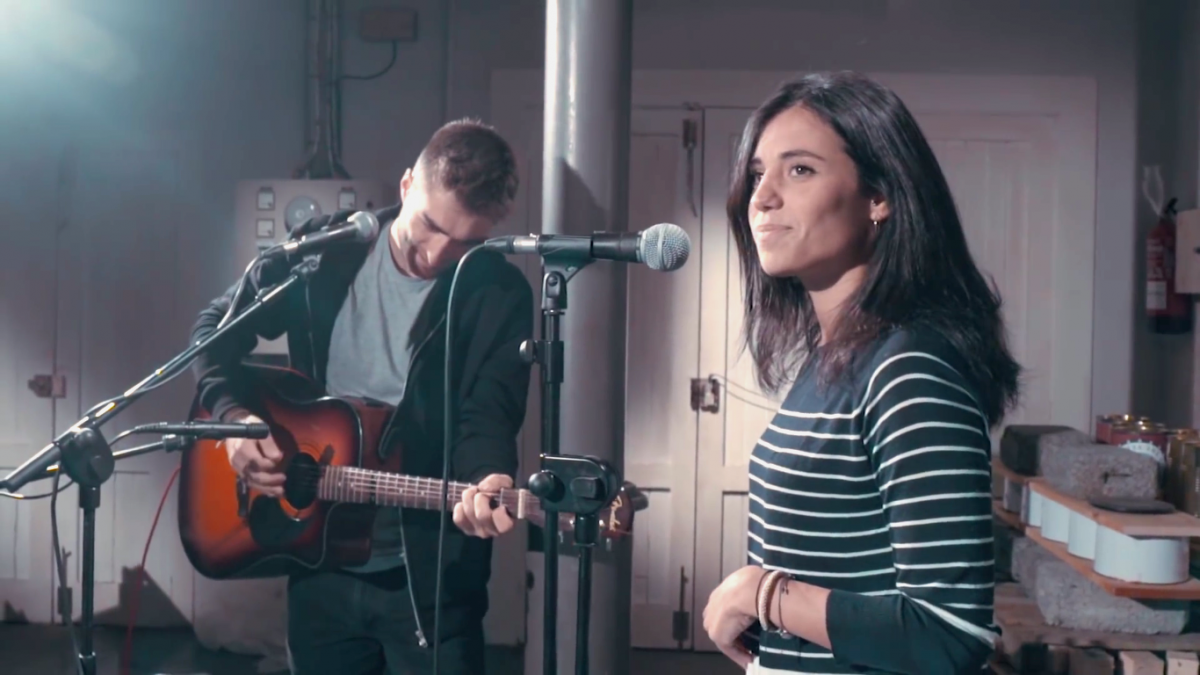
- Ane Negueruela (Nøgen)
- Born: Ane Negueruela Llamas; 1994 (age 31–32); Lazkao (Basque Country); Spain
- Citizenship: Spain
- Education: University of the Basque Country
- Occupations: singer, musician and doctor
- Years active: 2009–present
- Notable work: Egin kantu!

Ane Negueruela Llamas (born in Lazkao in 1994) is a Basque singer, musician and doctor, vocalist of the music group Nøgen.

== Life and career ==
Ane Negueruela was born in Lazkao (Basque Country) in 1994. In 2016 Negueruela became part of the music group Nøgen along with Alex Irazusta (guitar) and Markel Idigoras (ukulele). The group began with Markel Idigoras on Erasmus in Denmark, where he composed the first songs and what gave the group its name (Nøgen means naked in Danish). With Nøgen, in 2017 Negueruela released her first EP titled Lys (light in Danish). The following year, in 2018, he published the album Liv til døden (Live until die), also with Nøgen, which they presented at the Teatro Principal in San Sebastián. On their first tour they visited Japan, Cuba and Korea.

In 2018, Negueruela had to leave the group temporarily to focus on his university medical studies. She was replaced by the singer Eider Saez. At the end of 2021, Eider left the music group and began his solo career. After that, in 2022, Negueruela, who had already finished the MIR, returned to the group as a vocalist. In 2023 he published the album Åben Cirkel (Open circle) with Nøgen, the first after his return to the group. In 2024 the group received seven nominations at the XVI Edition of the MIN Independent Music Awards for the work Åben Cirkel.

In 2009 Negueruela participated in the hit TV talent show Egin kantu! of ETB 1 as a contestant and singer and was the winner of talent. One of the songs that gave her the victory was the song "En qué estrella estará" by the Spanish band Nena Daconte in its Basque version ("Izarren antzera").

In addition to his career in music, Negueruela studied medicine at the University of the Basque Country (2012–2018). In 2018 at the graduation ceremony, Negueruela took advantage of the graduation speech to denounce the sexism that women suffer in medicine internships. She later completed the MIR (intern physician) in the specialty of family medicine. She currently practices as a doctor at the Mendaro Hospital (Osakidetza), specializing in family medicine.

== Discography ==
=== With Nøgen ===
- 2017, Lys
- 2018, Liv til døden
- 2023, Åben Cirkel

== Filmography ==
=== Television ===
- 2024, Gora Bihotzak!, ETB 1 (guest)
- 2023, Joseba Arguiñano Sukalerrian, ETB 1 (guest)
- 2009, Egin kantu!, ETB 1 (contestant, winner)

== See also ==
- Egin kantu!
- Nerea Alias
