= Maialen Diez =

Spanish singer

- Born: Maialen Diez; 1995 (age 30–31); Andoain, Spain
- Citizenship: Spain
- Education: University of the Basque Country
- Occupation: Singer
- Years active: 2006–present
- Notable work: Betizu; Egin kantu! Kantugiro

Maialen Diez (born 1995) is a Spanish singer and musician, known for having participated in different ETB 1 music contests and for being the winner of the talent show Egin kantu!.

She made his debut at the age of ten in Betizu on the ETB 1 channel, being one of several Betizu artists (a former Betizu Star). She was the winner of the ETB 1 talent show Egin kantu!, which brought her great notoriety in the Basque Country and Spain.

== Life and career ==
She was born in Andoain (Gipuzkoa). Since she was little she studied at the Music School of Andoain (Gipuzkoa). There she studied solfeggio, transverse flute and guitar, and she was also a member of the Andoain Choir. She has also played on the Euskalduna soccer football team.

In the year 2007 she participated in the musical talent contest Egin kantu! from ETB1 and was the winner of the talent. She recorded the official album of the program, together with Oihan Larraza, Beñat Urkiola and Ane Gonzalez. In addition to that, as a member of the group, they gave different concerts during the years 2007 and 2008.

In 2015, she participated in the music contest Kantugiro, on ETB 1 channel. During the contest she sang song by the Spanish pop band La Oreja de Van Gogh. Due to her performances, she was a finalist in the contest.

She studied a Bachelor's degree in nursing at the University of the Basque Country. She is currently a midwife, a job that she combines with singing and music.

== Discography ==
- 2007, Egin Kantu (CD)

== Filmography ==
=== Television ===
Year	TV show	Role	Channel	Notes	References
2006	Betizu		ETB 1		
2007	Egin kantu!	herself, contestant, singer	ETB 1	Winner	
2015	Kantugiro	herself, contestant, singer	ETB 1	Finalist	
2017	Bago!az	herself, contestant, singer	ETB 1		

== See also ==
- Egin kantu!
