= Zuriñe Hidalgo =

Spanish TV presenter and singer

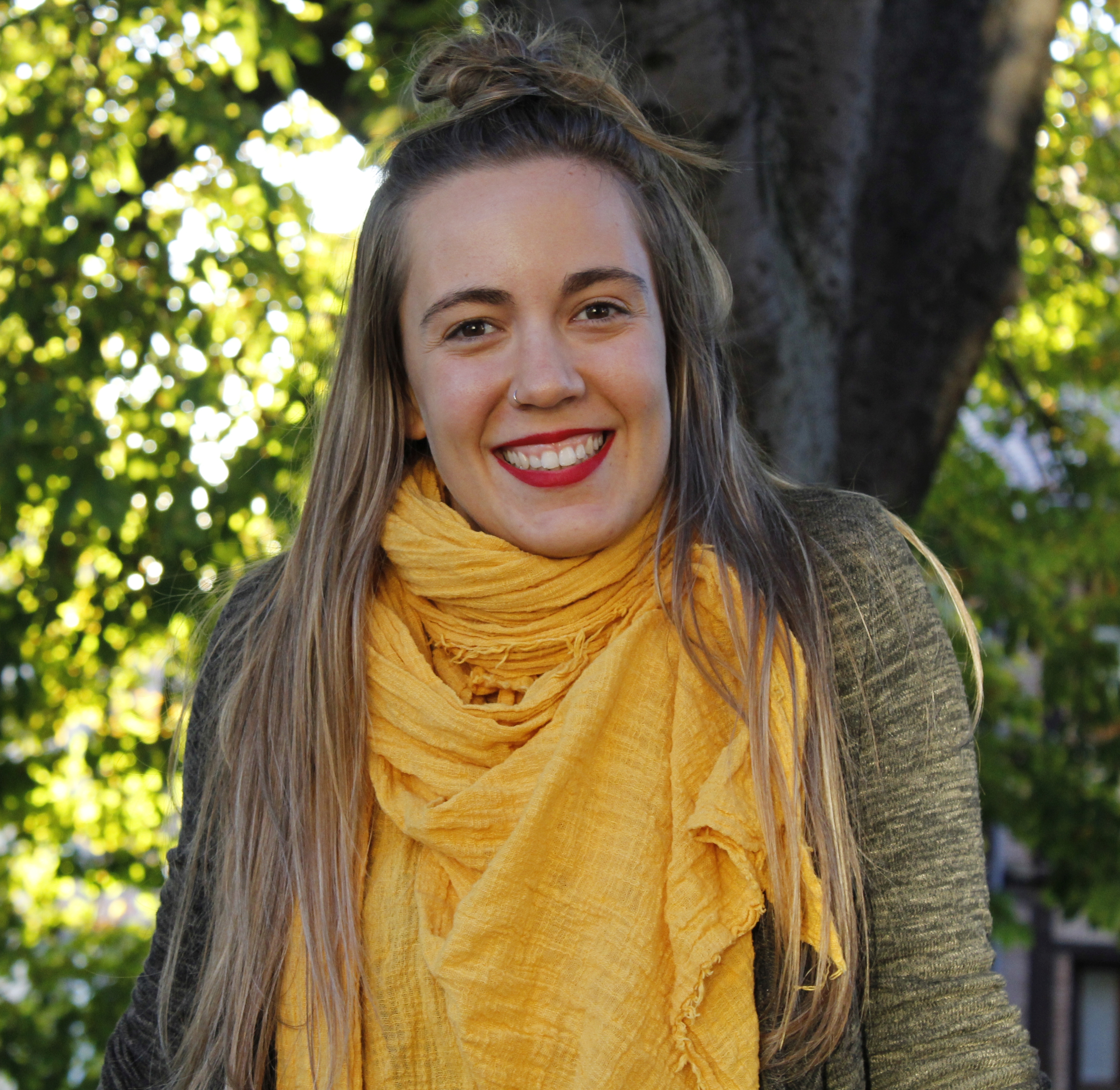
- Born: Zuriñe Hidalgo; October 19, 1990 (age 35); Vitoria-Gasteiz, Spain
- Citizenship: Spain
- Education: Public University of Navarre
- Occupations: TV presenter, singer, teacher
- Years active: 2000–present
- Known for: Betizu; Hesian
- Notable work: Betizu; Hesian
- Television: Betizu; Kanturgiro; Bago!az

Zuriñe Hidalgo (born October 19, 1990) is a Spanish singer, musician and TV presenter.

She made her debut at the age of ten in Betizu on the ETB 1 channel, being one of several Betizu artists (a former Betizu Star).

== Early life ==
Zuriñe Hidalgo was born in 1990, in Vitoria-Gasteiz, Álava, Basque Country (Spain).

== Career ==
Hidalgo received a bachelor's degree in early childhood education at the Public University of Navarre and worked as a teacher for several years. She was also trained in sex education and female menstruation, organizing workshops for women.

She began her television career in 2000 on the Betizu program on the ETB 1 channel where she debuted at just 10 years of age. She has been a presenter, among others, of the programs Betizu and 3Txulo on ETB 1. She was a member of the music group Betizu Taldea, along with Telmo Idígoras and Elene Arandia, a music group that achieved great notoriety, especially for the hit song "Lokaleko leihotik" or also for the single "Esaidazu".

Her participation and roles in the hit TV shows Betizu and being member of Betizu Taldea brought her acclaimed success and made her a child star in the Basque Country, becoming well known among the children and the audience.

For several years (2006–2021) she was the singer and vocalist of the Navarrese ska music group Hesian. In 2014 she presented the Kantugiro program. In 2017 she was the presenter of the musical contest Bago!az.

In 2022, she joined the cast of the Vikingak program, along with Amancay Gaztañaga and Erika Olaizola.

== Activism ==
Hidalgo is a feminist and women's rights activist. She has also advocated for the precariousness of women in relation to menstruation and female sexuality. She has also spoken out for the precariousness of cultural workers.

=== Controversies ===
Due to her social activism, she has sometimes been involved in small controversies. In 2017, it was included in the so-called "EITB controversy" by a television program, in which, according to some media, Hidalgo would have stated that the Spanish are dedicated to "compliment with women" and treat them "as if they were cattle". statements that were not liked in some sectors.

Zuriñe Hidalgo was one of the many child stars in Betizu (a former Betizu Star), where she had been since she was 11 years old. In 2022, as an adult, she recognized that it was not easy to be part of Betizu being so young and she criticized the program and ETB 1 channel for certain facts, declaring that "she suffered discrimination in situations ranging from the way they dressed her, to the way in which they treated her".

== Private life ==
She lives in Vitoria-Gasteiz.

== Filmography ==
=== Television ===
- Betizu, ETB 1
- 3Txulo, ETB 1
- A ze banda!, ETB 1
- Gure Kasa, ETB 1
- Kantugiro, ETB 1
- Bago!az, ETB 1
- Adinberri, ETB 1
- Vikingak, ETB 1

== See also ==
- Betizu
- Betizu Taldea
- Egin kantu!
- Nerea Alias
- Elene Arandia
