= Egin kantu! (TV series) =

Basque music talent show (TV program)

- Genre: Musical talent show
- Created by: Eduardo Barinaga
- Based on: The Voice; Operación Triunfo
- Directed by: Eduardo Barinaga
- Presented by: Nerea Alias
- Opening theme: Egin kantu! (song)
- Country of origin: Spain
- Original language: Basque
- No. of seasons: 4

Production
- Executive producer: Eduardo Barinaga
- Producer: Baleuko
- Production locations: Basque Country; Navarre; Spain
- Editor: Lorea Perez de Albeniz
- Production companies: Baleuko; EITB Media

Original release
- Network: ETB 1
- Release: 2006 – 2010

Egin kantu! (in the Basque, "Sing!") is a television program, a musical talent show (reality television talent show), aired on EITB network from 2006 to 2010 and presented by Nerea Alias. A music talent contest with viewer voting and reality show elements, which aimed to find the country's next singing sensation.

The talent show was broadcast between 2006 and 2010, with good reception and audiences, being a successful format of EITB Media. It was one of EITB Media's most successful shows, having one of the highest audience rating shares of all time (a share of around 10% audience).

== History ==
It was a musical talent show (musical talent show), broadcast by the ETB1 network and distributed by EITB Media. The program was produced and directed by the film and television producer and founder of the production company Baleuko Eduardo Barinaga and co-directed by Lorea Perez de Albeniz. The main theme of Talent was Egin Kantu (song).

The program was broadcast between 2006 and 2010, with good reception and audiences, being a successful format for EITB Media.

The program began broadcasting in September 2006, on the ETB1 network. The presenter of the talent was Nerea Alias, during the four seasons of the program. The program ended after four seasons in 2010, which was the last broadcast of the contest.

The talent show was a pool of talents, from which several well-known singers and artists emerged later, such as Ane Negueruela, Elene Arandia, María Ereña, Izar Algueró, Maialen Diez, Beñat Urkiola...

== Format ==
The format of the program followed a similar operation to others such as Star Academy, Operación Triunfo (OT), La Voz and others.

Contest participants had to first pass a selection audition where they were selected or not to participate. After that, already within the contest, the contestants were facing each other in different duels. The winners of each program were chosen by the public, who voted for their favorite singers. Thus, gala after gala and duel after duel until the winner or winners were known. In each program the contestants sang both songs in the Basque language and international successes and hits of the moment.

In each program the audience voted for their favorite candidate (public vote) until there was a winner.

To be contestants, the applicants had to overcome different phases of a casting to be able to be contestants on the program.

In each gala or episode of the program there was a guest participant (invited only in that episode, they were "Single-Day Guest Participant" or "Single-Episode Guest Participant"). After all the performances of the contestants in that gala or episode, the invited participant sang a song, while the public voted for the contestants and the public vote was counted.

== Hits ==
The contestants used to compete with national and international hits of the moment (2006-2010). Among them, "Zapatillas" (El Canto del Loco), "Me voy" (Julieta Venegas), "Ni Una Sola Palabra" (Paulina Rubio), "Vas a volverme loca" (Natalia), "Cien gaviotas" (Duncan Dhu), "A toda mecha" (Santa Justa Klan), "La maleta del abuelo" (Maria Isabel), "Y Yo Sigo Aquí" (Paulina Rubio), "20 de Enero" (La Oreja de Van Gogh), "Video Killed the Radio Star" (The Buggles), "Wake Me Up Before You Go-Go" (Wham!), "Besos" (El Canto del Loco), "Kisiera yo saber" (Melendi), "Limón y sal" (Julieta Venegas), "True Blue" (Madonna), "Muñeca de trapo" (La Oreja de Van Gogh)...

In addition, they also used to compete with hits in the Basque language of the moment, such as, "Lokaleko leihotik" (Betizu Taldea), "Gora Gora Betizu" (Betizu Taldea), "Kolperik jo gabe" (Betizu Taldea), "Ez Gaitu Inork Geldituko" (Urtz), "Ilargia" (Ken Zazpi), "Lau teilatu" (Itoiz), "Marea gora" (Itoiz) and others.

== Program products ==
As the talent show was one of EITB Media's most successful shows, many were the products and merchandising that came out of it. Among the published products are, among others, the official CD with songs from the program, the official DVD with the episodes of the program or the official CD-DVD with a karaoke of the program.

=== Music band ===
The official CD of the program was recorded by the winners of the program (official music band of the program): Maialen Diez, Oihan Larraza, Beñat Urkiola and Ane Gonzalez. In addition, on one of their albums, they had the collaboration of the singer and former member of the music band Betizu Taldea Telmo Idígoras.

The music band formed by Maialen Diez, Oihan Larraza, Beñat Urkiola and Ane Gonzalez (Egin Kantu music band) replaced the musical band Betizu Taldea (2002-2006).

In addition, another of the products of the talent show was the concerts of Egin kantu!. The band formed by the four winners of the program gave different concerts throughout the Basque Country, singing the official songs of the program.

== Professional team ==
The program had a team of professional teachers and coaches. The vocal coach was Joxe Mendizabal and the dance teacher and choreographer was Naiara Santacoloma.

After overcoming all the casting phases, the contestants prepared each of their actions previously with various classes and essays of voice and song and dance.

== Participants (contestants) ==
Among the participants (contestants) who have participated in Egin Kantu! in any of the editions or seasons are, among others: Ane Negueruela, Elene Arandia, María Ereña, Maialen Urbieta, Izar Algueró, Maialen Diez, Beñat Urkiola, Oihan Larraza, Ane González, Ainhoa Nieto, Itxaso Gil, Ixone Andreu, Andoni Polo, Naroa Merino, Imanol Aparicio, Joxan Mendizabal, Sara Larrañaga, Unai Miranda, Silvia Raya, Ukerdi Arrondo, Leire Garijo, Irati Echarri, Naiara Urresti, Ernesto Garitaonandia, Helena Elizondo, Maddi Aldasoro, Inge Garziandia, Amaia Lertxundi, Iara Barriga, Mirari Corchete, Helene Zeberio, ...

== Cultural impact ==
The Egin kantu! contest was a success for the vast majority of the generation of children born in the 90s. Its long duration (2006-2010) and its high audience rating shares made it very popular and well-known in the Basque Country and Navarra, being a well-known audiovisual product.

Some examples of its cultural impact, visibles on the social network Twitter, among others:

- @Martin_Paluego (2020-12-05). "Let Egin Kantu return!" (Tweet) (in Spanish) – via Twitter.
- @sleepingkell (2019-11-01). "The Voice is a cheap imitation of Egin Kantu I have no proof but no doubt" (Tweet) (in Spanish) – via Twitter.
- @Clara_de_luna_ (2022-05-24). "Tell me you remember Egin Kantu, for God's sake!" (Tweet) (in Spanish) – via Twitter.
- @cucciolina_ (2019-03-11). "Egin kantu! What a wonderful program. I'm dying. Egin kantu kalean egin kantu lanean egin kantu egin kantuuuuuuuuuu" (Tweet) (in Spanish) – via Twitter.
- @Mirari_L (2019-09-26). "Egin kantu was an awesome program!!!!!!!!!" (Tweet) (in Spanish) – via Twitter.
- @claroquesitia (2020-02-13). "To begin with, they would have hired me in Egin kantu!, because I did an excellent casting. I took a guitar from Betizu to sing "lokakeko lehiotik", but because I was fat they had to give up my talent" (Tweet) (in Spanish) – via Twitter.
- @gaztea (2023-02-24). "Betizu kluba, Egin Kantu!... @NereaAlias is one of the stars of our collective imagination, and in #BenetanZabiz they have given her the interview she deserves" (Tweet) (in Basque) – via Twitter.
- @artizarrr (2023-02-17). "When egin kantu existed, the mental health of Basque youth was a thousand times better" (Tweet) (in Basque) – via Twitter.

Examples of its cultural impact in other social networks and multimedia content:

- ARGIA, [@argia.eus] (12 March 2024). "Most idols come from TV. In our case: ETB. Or Disney Channel. So, we had: Nerea Alias and Egin Kantu. Or Sharpay and High School Musical". tiktok.
- ARGIA [@argia.eus]; (14 March 2024). "ETB or Disney Channel? Nerea Alias or Sharpay? Egin Kantu or High School Musical?" – via Instagram.
- Argia Podcast. BTN. 4 March 2024. "The Jesus Christ Fan Club is the largest in the world".

== See also ==
- Nerea Alias
- Betizu
- Operación Triunfo (Spanish TV series)
- Star Academy
