= María Ereña =

Spanish singer

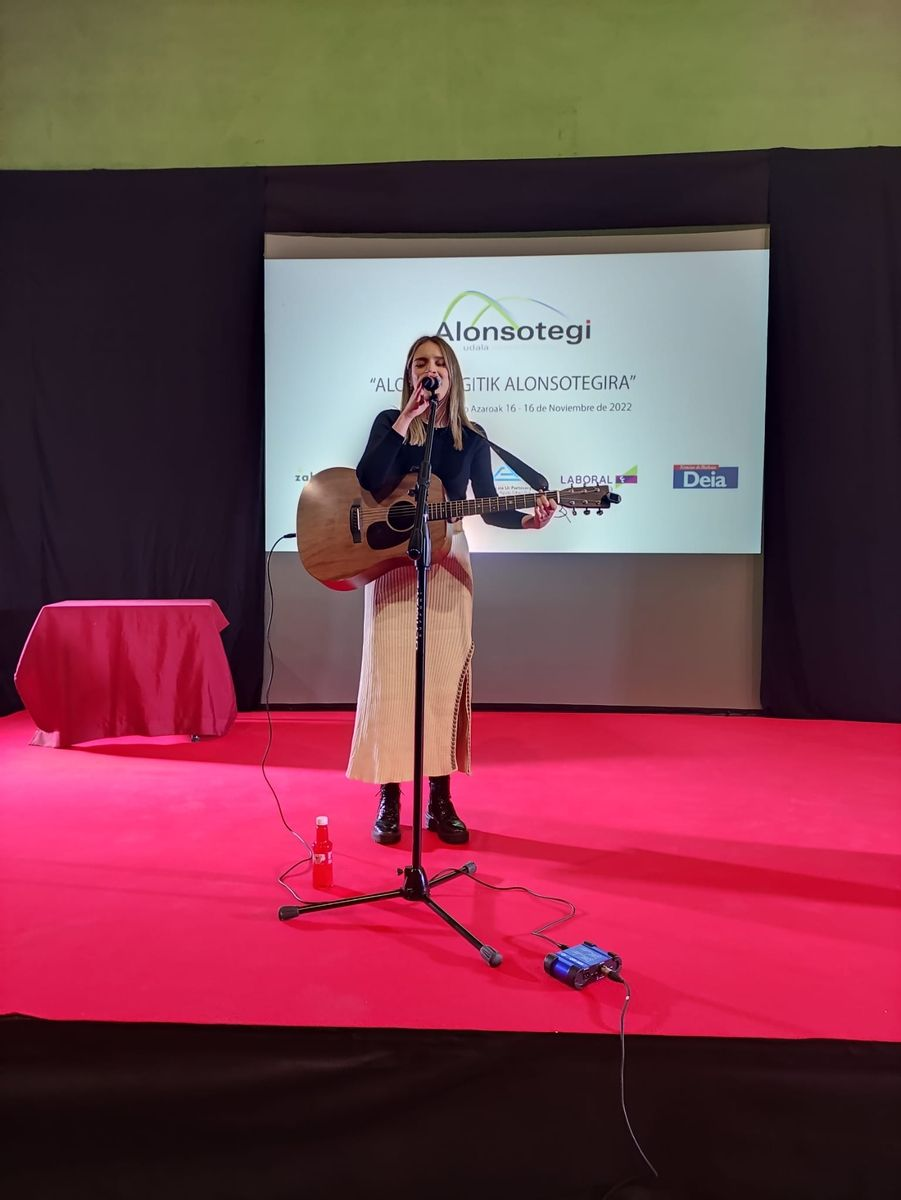
- Ereña in 2022
- Born: María Ereña Larrea; 1996 (age 29–30); Güeñes, Spain
- Citizenship: Spain
- Education: University of Deusto
- Occupation: singer
- Years active: 2006-present
- Notable work: Egin kantu! Betizu

María Ereña Larrea (born 1996) is a Spanish singer and musician.

== Life and career ==
In 2006 she participated in the hit TV talent show Egin kantu! on the ETB 1 channel as a contestant and singer and in Betizu program, where she debuted at just 10 years of age. Her participation and roles in the hit TV shows Egin kantu! and Betizu brought her acclaimed success and made her a child star in the Basque Country, becoming well known among the children and the audience.

After that, in 2011, she participated in the ETB 1 Haur Kantari Txapelketa program contest, where she was second finalist. In addition to that, she also participated as a contestant in the Stars. Izarrak Kalean and Kantugiro TV shows, leaving her as the winner in both. In 2017, she participated in the ETB 1 musical talent show Bago!az, where she was fourth finalist.

In 2019 she was part of the Gure Doinuak program as part of the program's music team. In 2012 she created the audiovisual project Gaur da eguna together with other artists, an audiovisual project in favor of gender equality and for the elimination of all violence against women.

She studied the Bachelor's Degree in Law at the University of Deusto (2014–2018). Her final degree thesis was about open government and the importance of transparency (public information, limits, ...).

She is currently a professional singer and musician. She is the vocalist of the Basque music group Patx & Run.

== Discography ==
- 2019, Itzalak

== Filmography ==
=== Television ===
Year	TV show	Role	Channel	Notes	References
2006-2007	Egin kantu!	herself, contestant, singer	ETB 1		
2011	Haur Kantari Txapelketa	herself, contestant, singer	ETB 1	2nd finalist	
2015	Izarrak Kalean	herself, contestant, singer	ETB 1	Winner	
2015	Kantugiro	herself, contestant, singer	ETB 1	Winner	
2017	Bago!az	herself, contestant, singer	ETB 1	4th finalist	
2019	Gure Doinuak	herself, musician	ETB 1	music team member	
