= List of Real Sociedad Femenino seasons =

This is a list of seasons played by Real Sociedad Femenino, the women's team of Real Sociedad, a Spanish football club from San Sebastián. Real Sociedad competes in the top-tier Primera División and plays in the Zubieta Facilities in Usurbil.

== Summary ==
Champions	Runners-up	Promoted	Relegated

Season	League										Cup	Supercup	UWCL	Top scorer	
Season	Tier	Div	Pos	Pld	W	D	L	GF	GA	Pts	Cup	Supercup	UWCL	Name(s)	Goal
2004–05	3	Reg.	1st	28	28	0	0	233	4	84					
2005–06	2	2ª	1st	24	20	3	1	110	15	63				(Spain) Itxaso García	19
2006–07	1	1ª	9th	26	7	6	13	30	51	27				(Spain) Laura Gómez	8
2007–08	1	1ª	10th	26	7	5	14	22	47	26				(Spain) Itxaso García (Spain) Larraitz Lucas	4
2008–09	1	1ª	10th	30	9	6	15	28	46	33				(Spain) Larraitz Lucas	8
2009–10	1	1ª	7th	28	11	6	11	55	49	39	First round			(Spain) Ainara Herrero	10
2010–11	1	1ª	8th	28	13	5	10	40	35	44	Semifinals			(Spain) Maialen Zelaia	8
2011–12	1	1ª	7th	34	19	5	10	58	35	62				(Spain) Maialen Zelaia	13
2012–13	1	1ª	10th	30	9	6	15	41	44	33				(Spain) Maialen Zelaia	6
2013–14	1	1ª	7th	30	10	10	10	36	34	40	Quarterfinals			(Spain) Aintzane Encinas	6
2014–15	1	1ª	11th	30	7	9	14	39	47	30				(Spain) Nahikari García	9
2015–16	1	1ª	5th	30	16	5	9	50	33	53	Quarterfinals			(Spain) Nahikari García	16
2016–17	1	1ª	8th	30	12	6	12	44	34	42	Quarterfinals			(Spain) Nahikari García	15
2017–18	1	1ª	7th	30	10	8	12	42	37	38	Quarterfinals			(Spain) Nahikari García	17
2018–19	1	1ª	6th	30	13	8	9	51	37	47	Champions			(Spain) Nahikari García	16
2019–20	1	1ª	6th	21	9	6	6	33	26	33	Round of 16	Runners-up		(Spain) Nahikari García	11
2020–21	1	1ª	5th	34	18	7	9	66	44	61	Quarterfinals			(Spain) Nerea Eizagirre (Spain) Amaiur Sarriegi	13
2021–22	1	1ª	2nd	30	21	3	6	67	38	66	Quarterfinals			(Spain) Amaiur Sarriegi	17
2022–23	1	1ª	8th	30	10	9	11	54	50	39	Round of 16	Runners-up	Round 2	(Spain) Amaiur Sarriegi	12
2023–24	1	1ª	8th	30	9	9	12	40	55	36	Runners-up			(Norway) Synne Jensen	14
2024–25	1	1ª	7th	30	12	5	13	40	45	41	Quarterfinals			(Spain) Amaiur Sarriegi	10
2025–26	1	1ª	3rd	30	20	6	4	61	27	66	Quarterfinals			(Spain) Edna Imade	11
