= Beñat Urkiola =

Spanish singer and bertsolari

- Born: Beñat Urkiola Irulegi; 1998 (age 27–28); Leitza, Spain
- Citizenship: Spain
- Education: University of the Basque Country
- Occupations: singer and bertsolari
- Years active: 2006–present
- Television: Betizu; Egin kantu!

Beñat Urkiola Irulegi (born 1998) is a Spanish singer and bertsolari.

He was the winner of the ETB 1 talent show Egin kantu!, which brought him great notoriety in the Basque Country and Spain. He made his debut at the age of ten on Betizu on ETB 1.

== Life and career ==
He was born in Leitza. Since he was little he studied at the Music School of Leitza (Navarra). There he studied solfeggio, transverse flute and guitar. He was also a member of the Leitza choir. He was also trained in Basque music and dance from a young age.

In the years 2006–2007 he participated in the ETB 1 musical talent contest Egin kantu!. The grand final of the talent contest took place at the Gazteszena theater in San Sebastián. In the final, Urkiola sang the song "Ilargia" by the group Ken Zazpi with which he went to the next phase and ended up winning the contest.

He recorded the official album of the program, together with Oihan Larraza, Maialen Diez and Ane Gonzalez. In addition to that, as a member of the group, they gave different concerts during the years 2007 and 2008.

Urkiola is also trained as a bertsolari. In 2007, when he was only nine years old, he won a written bertsolarism contest. He regularly participates in bertsolarism performances and written bertsolarism sessions.

He studied engineering at the IMH of the University of the Basque Country (2016–2020). He is currently an engineer, a profession that he combines with bertsolarism and music.

== Private life ==
He is the brother of the television presenter Joseba Urkiola.

== Discography ==
- 2007, Egin Kantu (CD)

== Filmography ==
=== Television ===
- Betizu, ETB 1
- Egin kantu!, ETB 1 (winner)

== See also ==
- Nerea Alias
