= Itoiz =

Basque pop music band of the 1970-1980s

- Origin: Mutriku/Ondarroa, Basque Autonomous Community, Spain
- Genres: Progressive rock, pop-rock
- Years active: 1978–1988
- Past members: Juan Carlos Pérez; Foisis (José Gárate); José A. Fernández; Estanis Osinalde; Joseba Erkiaga; Germán Ors; Jimmi Arrabit; Jean-Marie Ecay; Xabi Pery

Itoiz was the name of a Basque music band from the coastal towns of Mutriku and Ondarroa, starting off in 1978 and disbanded in 1988. Born in times of turmoil for the Basque Autonomous Community (Spain), Itoiz stems from a dancing music band (i.e. playing other groups' songs) called Indar Trabes (1974), which performed mainly in evening festivities of towns. Throughout their existence spanning ten years, Itoiz dealt with several styles ranging from folk to progressive rock to pop.

== History ==
=== Establishment ===
In 1978, the members of the band Indar Trabes elaborated an LP album due for release in the Durango Basque Book and Music Fair; it included songs composed largely by the frontman Juan Carlos Pérez. They decided to rebrand the group on the grounds that the previous name was associated to evening dancing performances. They chose Itoiz (not because of the famous valley of the same name in Navarre).

=== Evolution ===
Their first album featured intimate and whimsical lyrics, wrapped up in progressive rock music. During the next three years they went through various reshuffles in the line-up, and the music grew more complex and elaborated, but the symphonic sound remained until their third album Alkolea.

In 1983 they launched the successful album Musikaz blai, which gave up previous progressive and jazzy music patterns, switching to pop-rock along the lines of prevailing music trends. Juan Carlos Pérez explained, "We used a progressive rock rhythmic pattern to fashion songs, while [guitar player] Jean-Marie Ecay brought in a new one, the one we called 'Fleetwood Mac rhythm', a binary rhythmic pattern we didn't know before. He brought along the song concept too, of a three-minute duration and a chorus. Up to that point, we made small conceptual pieces, songs with a long development."

The LP album Espaloian was released next in 1985 to critical and public acclaim, featuring such hits as "Clash eta Pistols", "Espaloian" and "Hegal egiten". Unexpectedly for frontman Pérez, this more natural album earned them numerous concerts and record turnouts. Despite the band's relatively high popularity, they came in for bitter criticism and had to put up with hostile attitudes on the part of other bands on the rise in the Basque Country in the middle 80s as well as their public.

These bands stood for the punk and rebellious music movement gaining momentum at the time (Kortatu, Hertzainak, etc.) with which they often had to share the bill. "For the bands of the RRV [Basque rebellious rock], we represented the establishment's demands, commercialism, we were politically correct. The situation was really difficult. We had to face up to the people's attacks." Another LP followed, Ambulance (1987), but by that year Jean-Marie Ecay had quit the group (1984) and went onto another bigger Spanish band.

=== Last years and break-up ===
Juan Carlos Pérez was alone in charge of the whole artistic production and friction among members of the band started to mount. As Pérez was tired of the situation within the band, he finally decided to break it up with a last live album, Eremuko dunen atzetik dabil (1988)

== Line-up ==
The original line-up inherited from the band Indar Trabes went through various changes, and parentheses took place too (e. g., when prior to the release of Ezekiel, some members joined the band and some others quit). Accordingly, the band's music expertise and exigence in performance improved gradually. Some members worth highlighting:

- Juan Carlos Pérez: Guitar and voice
- Foisis (José Gárate): Bass guitar
- José A. Fernández: Piano and keyboards (until 1985)
- Estanis Osinalde: Drums (until 1979)
- Joseba Erkiaga: Flute (until 1982)
- Germán Ors: Guitar (1981–1983)
- Jimmi Arrabit: Drums (as of 1982)
- Jean-Marie Ecay: Guitar (1983–1985)
- Xabi Pery: Guitar (1987–1988)

== Discography ==
- Itoiz (1978): Contains some tracks that have struck a chord in Basque music, such as romantic "Lau teilatu" (four roofs), elected by popular vote in the 2000s best Basque song ever; poignant "Hilzori I" and "Hilzori II", poetic "Astelehen urdin batean"; etc.
- Ezekiel (1980): A totally conceptual work developed around the axis of prophet Ezekiel; allegoric, almost religious, featuring a chilling children chorus line.
- Alkolea (1982): The sound remains signature Itoiz sound. Song "Marilyn: sagardotegia eta jazzmana" is its catchiest attraction.
- Musikaz blai (1983): A full-fledged pop album with elaborate, landmark tracks like "As noites da Radio Lisboa" or "To Alice", alongside catchy "Marea gora".
- Espaloian (1985): Confirms Itoiz's know-how and craft with such abiding songs as "Hegal egiten", "Clash eta Pistols", etc.
- Ambulance (1987): Rockier sound, dirtier; "Ambulance" or "Non nagoen" should be highlighted.
- ...eremuko dunen atzetik dabil (1988). Final live album.
- Itoiz 1978-1988 (2000). A compilation comprising all the albums in Itoiz's history, as well as a booklet describing the band's history.

== See also ==
- Hesian
- Huntza
- Ez Gaitu Inork Geldituko
