= Vicente Zorita Alonso =

Assassinated political candidate (b. 1920, d. 1980)

Vicente Zorita Alonso (1920, Ponferrada - 14 November 1980) was a politician in Spain who was assassinated by the armed separatist group ETA. He was a candidate in the first elections to the Basque Parliament for People's Alliance.

== Biography ==
Vicente Zorita Alonso was killed in the town of Santurce in Bizcay on 14 November 1980. He held the third place on the People's Alliance list in the first elections to the Basque Parliament, which took place in March 1980. Prior to his death, he had worked as an administrative employee for over 30 years. Zorita was married and had four children.

=== Murder ===
The murder occurred on the night of 14 November 1980 when the separatist group ETA kidnapped and killed Vicente Zorita. They forced him into a vehicle that had been stolen two hours earlier. Around 11 PM, some young people discovered Vicente's body upside down, with his face covered, bleeding, and riddled with bullets on a road near the district of Cabieces in Santurce. They immediately informed the Municipal Police, who then notified the National Police and the judge. The body showed at least seven bullet wounds, including one in the head. The murderers left the body with a Spanish flag placed inside his mouth like a gag. Investigations revealed that Vicente Zorita was first machine-gunned in the back and then shot in the head. His personal documents including his People's Alliance membership card, were found with him. Around 12:30 AM, the body was transferred by ambulance to the deposit of the Civil Hospital of Basurto. On the same day, at approximately 8 PM, a metallic blue Citroen CX Pallas was stolen at gunpoint from the street of María Díaz de Haro in Portugalete. The vehicle was later found abandoned in the neighborhood of Buenavista in Portugalete at 3 AM the following day.

No one has been convicted for this attack. According to the Secretariat of Peace and Coexistence of the Basque Government, the legal proceedings regarding this crime are currently on provisional dismissal.

The newspaper Egin reported the day after the attack that the military branch of ETA in Santurce claimed responsibility for the attack through an anonymous call shortly before 11:30 pm on the same day. The group claimed "to have interrogated him thoroughly and later, Vicente Zorita was killed". He also said: "we warned the members of Alianza Popular that of following Olarra with their position of not negotiating with their workers, within a week we will begin to execute members of A.P. for their identification with his ideological approaches. Therefore, we accuse them directly of the decisions taken by Olarra about it".

Four days after the attack, on 18 November 1980, Egin published a story reaffirming ETA's claim of responsibility for the killing through a statement. In the statement, ETA's military insisted that "they interrogated Vicente Zorita before they killed him "and warns" the Alianza Popular's group and the oligarchic sector to which he lends his political support so that they abandon their authoritarian position to blackmail, threaten and wield repressive strategies against the just claims of the class worker, and finally end by renouncing the policy of abuse and arbitrariness to which they are subjecting the movement worker and the politician of decapitalisation and economic chaos in which they want to flood the South Euskadi ".

His murder remains unsolved.

== Bibliography ==
- MERINO, A., CHAPA, A., Raíces de Libertad. pp. 83–91. FPEV (2011). ISBN 978-84-615-0648-4
- This article makes use of material translated from the corresponding article in the Spanish-language Wikipedia.
