= Aimar Sagastibelza =

Spanish footballer

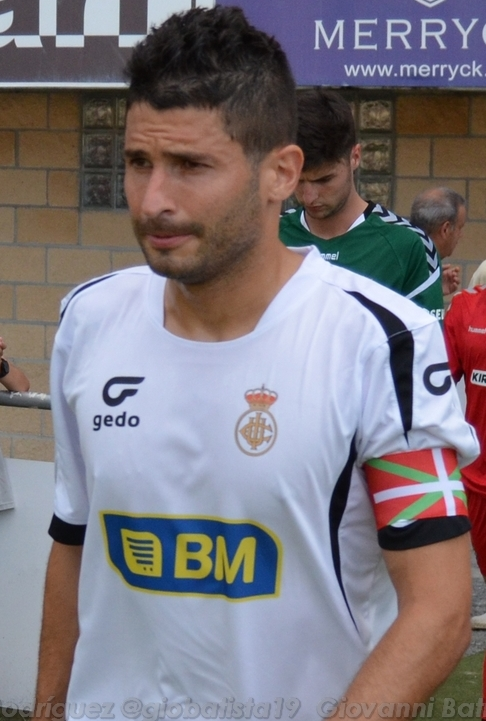
- Aimar with Real Unión in 2018

Personal information
- Full name: Aimar Sagastibelza Caballero
- Date of birth: 5 July 1984 (age 42)
- Place of birth: Leitza, Spain
- Height: 1.79 m (5 ft 10 in)
- Position: Centre-back

Senior career*
Years	Team	Apps	(Gls)
2003–2006	Tolosa		
2006–2007	Beasain	34	(3)
2007–2008	Pobla Mafumet	35	(5)
2008–2009	Gimnàstic	2	(0)
2009–2012	Teruel	105	(8)
2012–2013	Eibar	9	(0)
2013–2018	Real Unión	135	(7)
2018–2019	Gernika	36	(2)
2019–2022	Amorebieta	54	(3)
2022–2024	Barakaldo	41	(1)
- * Club domestic league appearances and goals as of 15 May 2024

Aimar Sagastibelza Caballero (born 5 July 1984) is a Spanish professional footballer who plays as a centre-back.

== Club career ==
Born in Leitza, Navarre, Aimar made his debut as a senior with Tolosa CF in the 2005–06 season, in Tercera División. After a short stint at SD Beasain he joined Gimnàstic de Tarragona, initially being assigned to the farm team also in the fourth tier.

In the summer of 2008, Aimar was promoted to the Catalans' first team in the Segunda División. He played his first match as a professional on 22 November, featuring the last 11 minutes of a 1–1 away draw against Real Murcia.

Aimar terminated his contract with Nàstic on 16 September 2009, and signed with CD Teruel of the fourth division a day later. He appeared in 36 games and scored once in his first season, which ended in promotion.

On 28 June 2012, Aimar joined Segunda División B club SD Eibar. He featured sparingly for the side, who were promoted to the professional leagues after a four-year absence, and subsequently moved to Real Unión also in division three, where he was at one point part of one of the league's oldest squads.

On 27 August 2018, Aimar signed for third-tier Gernika Club. The 35-year-old agreed to a contract at SD Amorebieta in the same league and region the following July, helping in their first-ever promotion to the second division at the end of the 2020–21 campaign.
