= Santurtzi =

Santurtzi Santurce (Spanish)
- Municipality
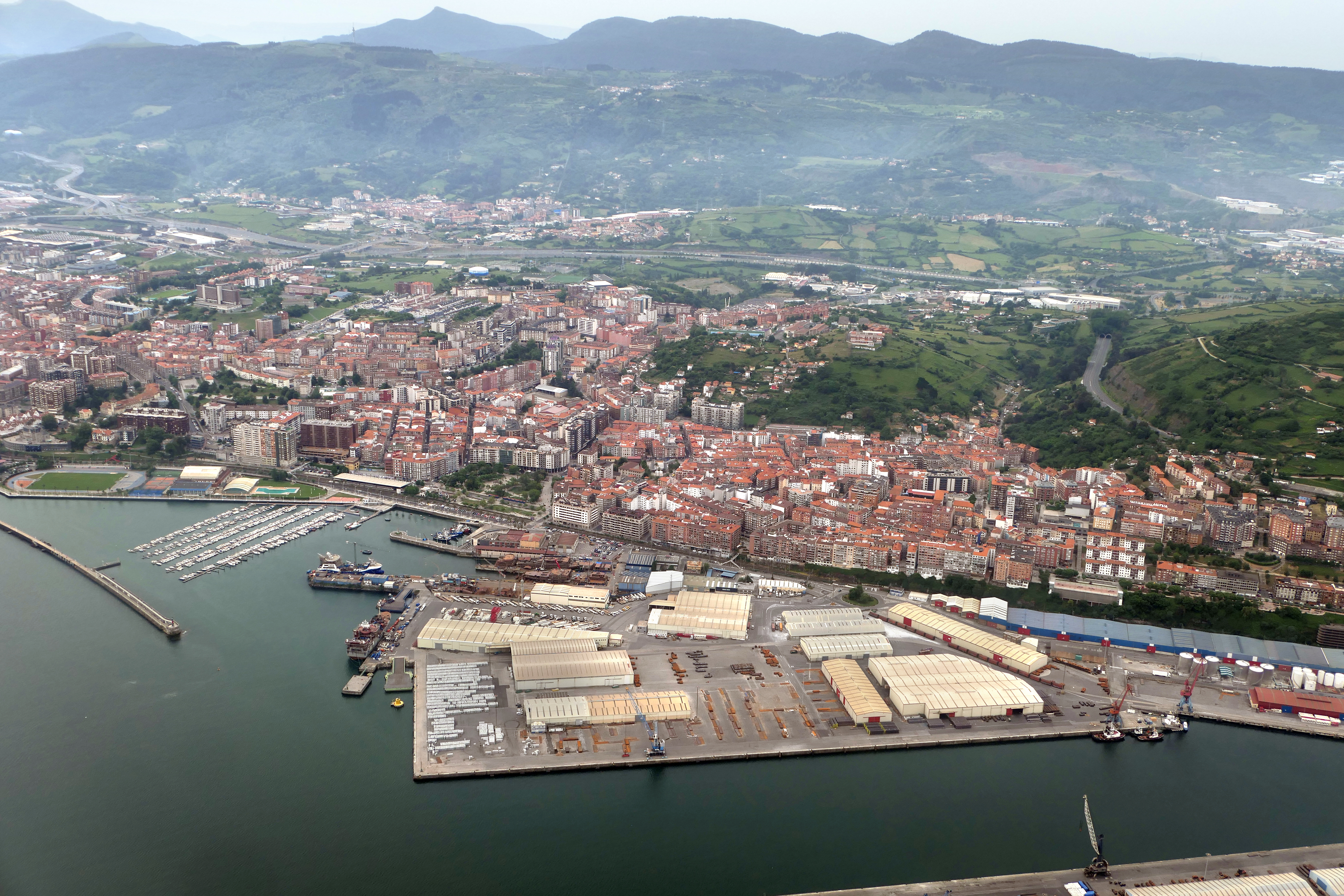
- Aerial view

- Flag Coat of arms

- Location of Santurtzi within the Basque Country Location of Santurtzi within Spain
- Coordinates: 43°19′49″N 03°1′53″W
- Country: Spain
- Autonomous community: Basque Country
- Province: Biscay
- Comarca: Greater Bilbao
- Founded: 1075 (first written reference)

Government
  - Mayor: Karmele Tubilla (2023-2027) (PNV-EAJ)

Area
  - Total: 8.87 km^{2} (3.42 sq mi)
- Elevation: 2 m (6.6 ft)

Population (2025)
  - Total: 46,530
  - Density: 5,250/km^{2} (13,600/sq mi)
- Demonym(s): Santurzano, santurtziarra (eusk.)
- Time zone: UTC+1 (CET)
  - Summer (DST): UTC+2 (CEST)
- Postal code: 48980
- Official language(s): Basque, Spanish
- Website: Official website

Santurtzi (Basque: [santuɾts̻i]; Spanish: Santurce; Basque for 'Saint George') is a port city and municipality in the province of Biscay in the autonomous community of the Basque Country in northern Spain. It is located in the Bilbao Abra bay, near the mouth of the Nervión river, on its left bank, 14 kilometres (8.7 mi) downriver from Bilbao and forms part of the Bilbao metropolitan area. It has 46,530 inhabitants.

The barrio of Santurce in San Juan, the capital city of Puerto Rico, derives its name from Santurtzi.

== History and etymology ==
According to legends, the current church of St. George was originally founded as a monastery by English monks fleeing from religious persecution. They established themselves on the Basque coast, specifically the Somorrostro Valley, from which would later develop the town of Santurtzi.

The name Santurtzi is derived from the Latin Sant Georgi, as was the hermitage in Gordejuela near current Oquendo. In neighbouring Cantabria, Burgos and Araba exist several towns with variations of the same name: Santurde, Santiurde de Reinosa and Santurdejo.

The Spanish language form Santurce first appeared in 1333, whilst its Basque counterpart would first be shown written in 1372. During the Middle Ages it could also be found referred to as San Jurdic, San Yurdie, Sturse and Santursi, amongst others. In current day, both names are used interchangeably, with certain preference given to Santurtzi, given its frequent use in Spanish.

The official name of the municipality has also seen various changes. During the 19th century it was officially considered to be Santurce, however in 1901 it was divided in two. The inland part of this division would become Santurce Ortuella, as the mining town of Ortuella had grown enough to promote itself as the largest urban conglomeration of Santurce. The coastal side maintained its population base in Santurtzi, and began to be called Old Santurce. The cultural and traditional relationship between the two divisions can still be observed in the border area of Kabiezes.

On 14 November 1980, Vicente Zorita Alonso—a candidate for the Basque Parliament and a long time administrative employee—was murdered by ETA as a statement against political supporters of the oligarchy.

== Geography ==
In general, Santurtzi has a very rough orography, although excluding Mount Serantes (452m) - one of its most symbolic topographic elements - it is not at high altitude, the significant heights being spurs of the Serantes (Serandi): The Mallet (245m) and the Fortified Heights (123 and 106m). Its relief is contained within the north flank of the anticline of Biscay. It is a structural type relief composed of urgonian limestone from the Cretaceous period found all throughout Punta Lucero-Serantes, smoothly inclined towards the Estuary of Bilbao.

The climate in Santurtzi pertains to the humid oceanic climate type. The temperatures are moderate throughout the year, with more frequent rains in spring and autumn. Winters are mild and summers not excessively warm. The average temperature is 20 °C (70ªF) in summer and 8 °C (48ªF) in winter.

== Demographics ==
Historical population
Year	Pop.	±%
1910	3,378	—
1920	4,780	+41.5%
1930	7,997	+67.3%
1940	8,381	+4.8%
1950	9,922	+18.4%
1960	25,218	+154.2%
1970	46,417	+84.1%
1981	53,919	+16.2%
1991	50,466	−6.4%
2001	47,173	−6.5%
2011	47,101	−0.2%
2021	46,112	−2.1%
Source: INE

As of 2025, the population is 46,530, of which 48.0% are male, and 52.0% are female. Minors make up 14.2% of the population, and seniors make up 25.2%.

=== Immigration ===
As of 2025, immigrants make up 10.8% of the population. The 5 largest foreign countries of birth are Morocco, Colombia, Venezuela, Romania, and Nicaragua.

== Administration ==
=== Mayors ===
Years	Mayor	Party
1979-1983	José Antonio Loidi Alcaraz	EAJ-PNV
1983-1987	José Miguel Darquistade Albizua	PSOE
1987-1991	José Miguel Darquistade Albizua	PSOE
1987-1995	José Miguel Darquistade Albizua	PSOE
1995-1999	José Miguel Darquistade Albizua	PSE-EE
1999-2003	Francisco Javier Cruz Expósito	PSE-EE
2003-2007	Francisco Javier Cruz Expósito	PSE-EE
2007-2011	Ricardo Ituarte Azpiazu	EAJ-PNV
2011-2015	Ricardo Ituarte Azpiazu	EAJ-PNV
2015-2019	Aintzane Urkijo Sagredo	EAJ-PNV
2019-2023	Aintzane Urkijo Sagredo	EAJ-PNV
2023-2027	Karmele Tubilla Artetxe	EAJ-PNV

=== Santurtzi City Council ===
Santurtzi City Council (2023-2027):

Mayor

- Karmele Tubilla (PNV)

Councillors

- Edorta Rodrigo Izaola (PNV)
- Itziar Carrocera Fernández (PNV)
- Miguel Álvarez Ramírez (PNV)
- Ixone Andreu (PNV)
- Sonia López Bahamonde (PNV)
- Imanol Urrutxua Betanzos (PNV)
- Juan Andrades García (PSE)
- Itziar Utrera Pérez (PSE)
- Mario Gómez Pérez (PSE)
- Olga Pastor Albizu (PSE)
- Pedro Martínez González (PSE)
- Ainhoa Lopera Corada (Elkarrekin Podemos)
- José Manuel De Pablos Bajo (Elkarrekin Podemos)
- Miren Matanzas Gorostizaga (EH Bildu)
- Carlos Sáez Méndez (EH Bildu)
- Amaia Ginea Mardones (EH Bildu)
- Jose Ignacio Martín Haba (EH Bildu)
- Naiara Gutierrez Bilbao (EH Bildu)
- Beñat Goikoetxea López (EH Bildu)
- Luis Ángel Urdiales Villanueva (EH Bildu)

== Monuments ==
- San Jorge church (1725, the tower in 1844)
- House Toasts (1890)
- Town Hall (1905)
- Monument to Cristóbal Murrieta (1923)
- Patronato Santa Eulalia (1914)
- Home and clinical San Juan de Dios (1925)
- Oriol Palace (1913)
- Science of navigation school (1860) and Hijas de la Cruz college (1863)
- Virgen del Mar church (1901)
- Fishermen Confraternity (1916)
- Town Park (1918) and Central Kiosk (1917)
- Mamariga fountain (1882)
- Monument to the Sardinera (1964)
- Fishing Port (1916) and Virgin of Carmen (1950)
- Museum of Sculptures
- Monument to Miguel de Unamuno
- Señorío de Vizcaya Square (redesign 2007)
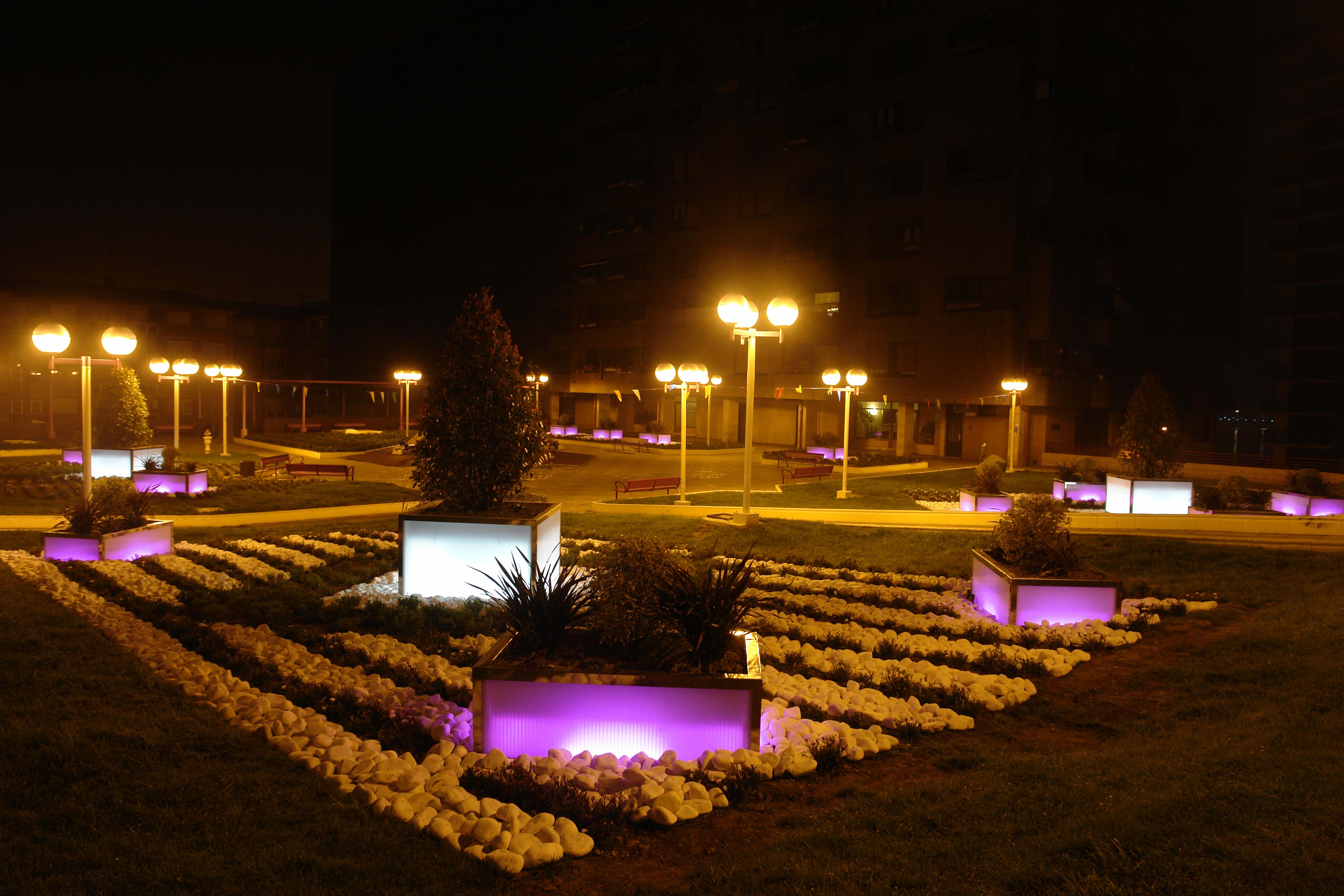
Señorío de Vizcaya Square

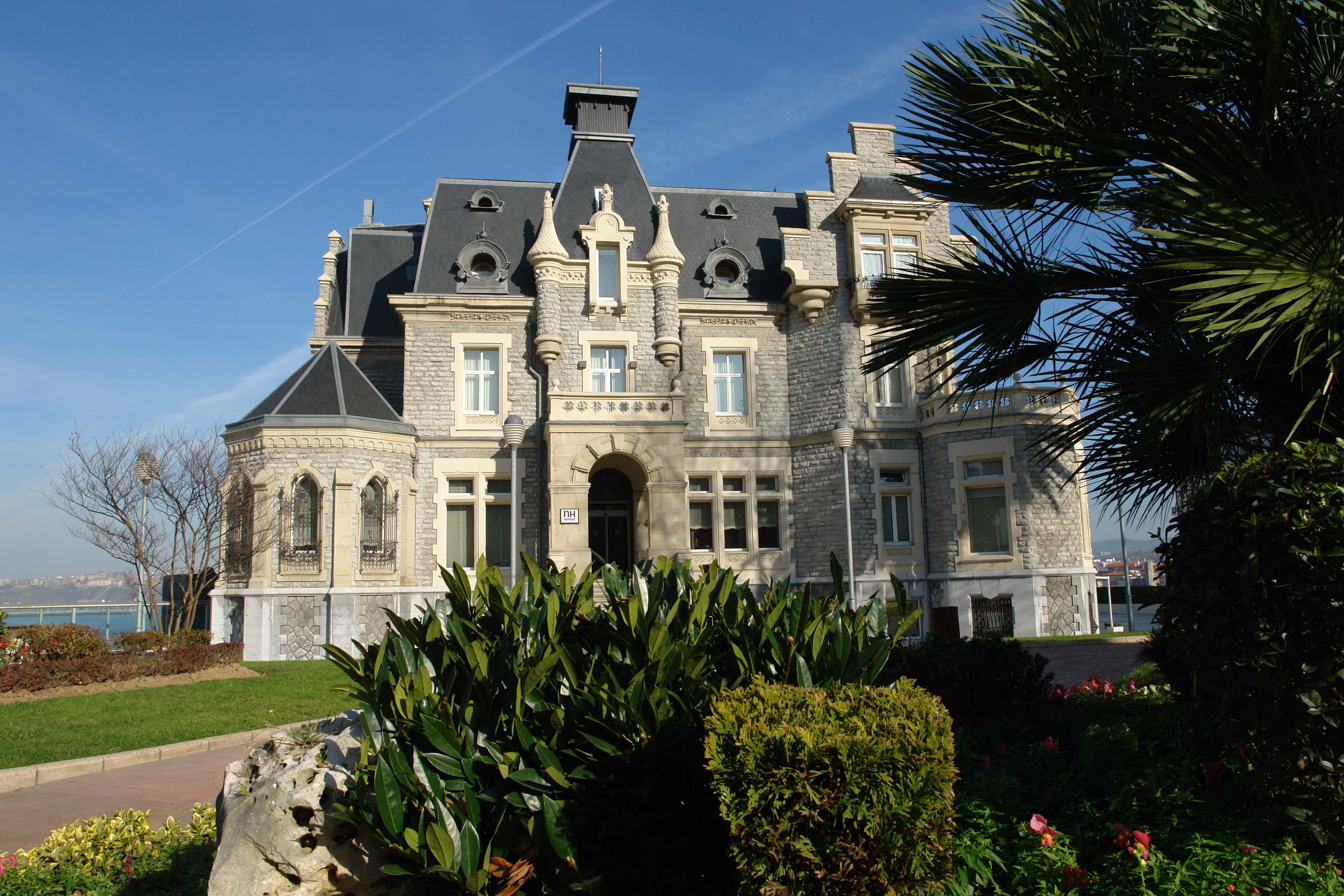
Oriol Palace

== Events and festivities ==
The life in the area is focused on the sea, which inspires its work and its leisure. Fishing boat and rowing boat races, and the celebrations of the Virgin of the Carmen are carried out each year.

- Easter Monday - Pascua - Cornites
- April 23, San Jorge
- June 24, San Juan, San Juan neighbourhood
- June 29, San Pedro (Cabieces neighbourhood)
- July 16, Virgen del Carmen
- September 8, Virgen del Mar (Mamariga neighbourhood)
