= Etxarri-Aranatz =

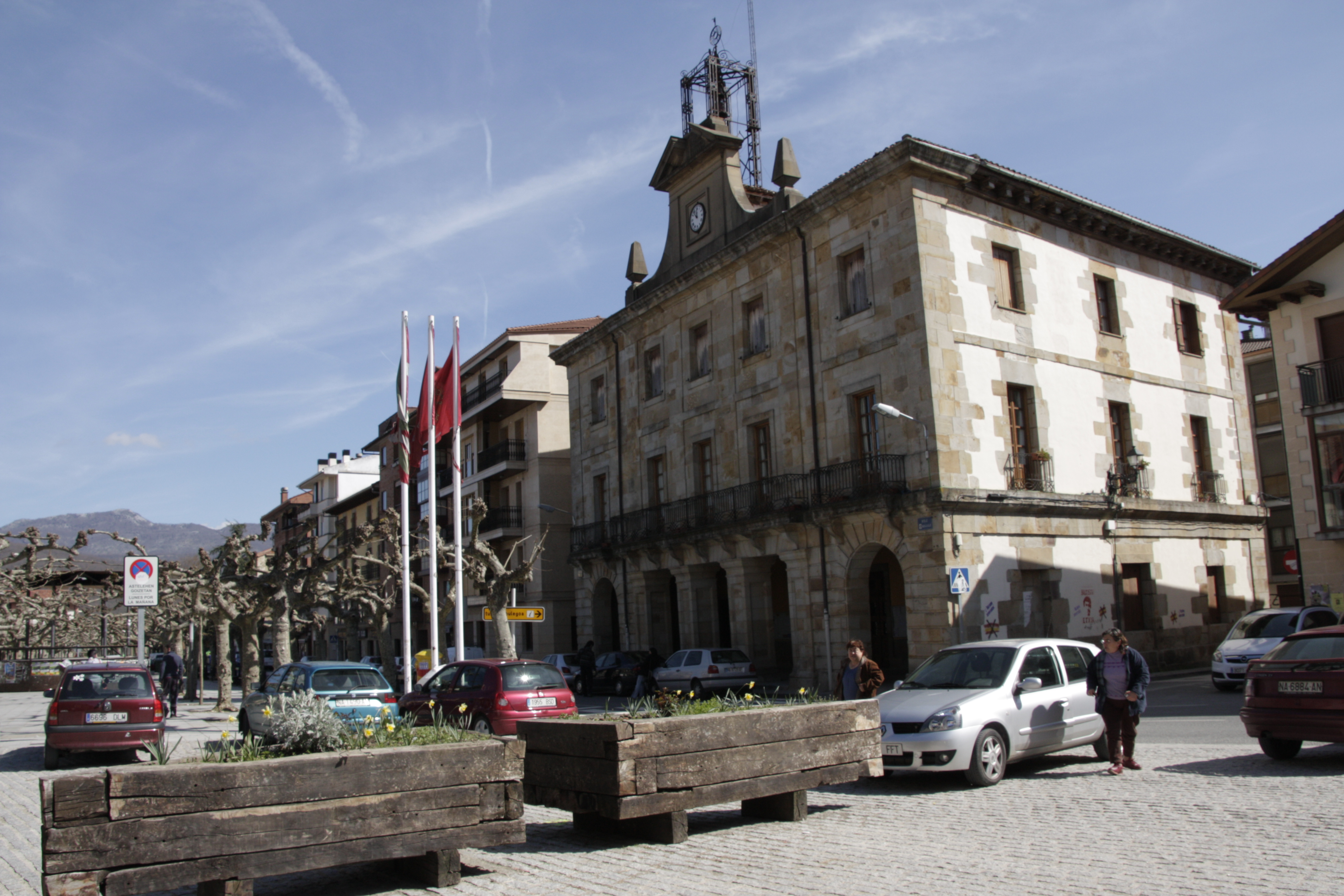
- Town hall of Etxarri-Aranatz

- Coat of arms

- Location of Etxarri-Aranatz within Navarre Location of Etxarri-Aranatz within Spain
- Coordinates: 42°54′40″N 2°4′12″W
- Country: Spain
- Autonomous community: Navarra

Government
  - Mayor: Silvia Marañón Chasco

Area
  - Total: 33 km^{2} (13 sq mi)
- Elevation: 509 m (1,670 ft)

Population (2025-01-01)
  - Total: 2,551
  - Density: 77/km^{2} (200/sq mi)
- Time zone: UTC+1 (CET)
  - Summer (DST): UTC+2 (CEST)
- Postal code: 31820
- Website: www.etxarriaranatz.eus

Etxarri-Aranatz (Spanish: Echarri-Aranaz) is a town and municipality located in the province and autonomous community of Navarre, northern Spain. Etxarri-Aranatz was founded in 1312.

During the First Carlist War, it was occupied and fortified by Liberal troops. An attempt by Carlists to break in during the autumn of 1834 with the aim of capturing the artillery there failed.

The Basque-language rock band Hesian is based in Etxarri-Aranatz.
