= Leire Merino =

Spanish dancer and singer

- Born: Leire Merino Garín; 1988 (age 37–38); Zizur Mayor/Zizur Nagusia, Spain
- Education: London Contemporary Dance School (BA, PG); National University of Distance Education (BA)
- Occupations: Dancer, singer
- Years active: 2002–present
- Notable work: Betizu Taldea

Leire Merino Garín (born 1988) is a Spanish dancer and singer.

Currently, she lives in London and is trained as a dancer. She has dance with the London Contemporary Dance School, with choreographers such as Richard Alston or Siobhan Davies, with the Quicksilver Dance Company or the Tavaziva Dance company.

She made her debut at the age of twelve in Betizu on the ETB 1 channel, being one of several Betizu artists (a former Betizu Star).

== Early life ==
Leire Merino was born in 1988 in Zizur Mayor/Zizur Nagusia, Navarre (Spain).

== Career ==
She began his television career in 2000–2001 on the Betizu program on the ETB 1 channel where he debuted at just 12 years of age. She won the Betimu contest (within the Betizu program) and was selected as a member of the musical group Betizu Taldea. She was a member of the Betizu Taldea group until its dissolution in 2005. With Betizu Taldea she released three albums and gave tours and concerts.

In addition to that, she was also trained in classical dance since she was little. She began her contemporary dance training with Antonio Calero and Almudena Lobon in the Spanish Compañía Nacional de Danza. In 2006, she joined the Aldanza dance company.

In 2009 she moved to London to train professionally in classical dance. She went to the London Contemporary Dance School (LCDS) in London, where she completed her advanced studies in dance. She graduated with a BA in contemporary dance at the London Contemporary Dance School in 2012 and later took a postgraduate degree in dance, also at the LCDS.

In London, she was a member of the companies and choreographies of choreographers such as Richard Alston or Siobhan Davies. She also danced in the Quicksilver Dance Company (Rambert youth company). She subsequently joined the dance company Tavaziva Dance (LCDS Postgraduate Apprenticeship Scheme).

Garín is also trained in lyrical singing. She is a soprano voice.

Besides that, she also graduated in philology at the National University of Distance Education and she specialises in dance language.

== Dance ==
- 2008, A.D. 2008, at the Escena Festival
- 2011, Ganimede, at the Place Theatre in London (with London Contemporary Dance School)
- 2013, Tavaziva Dance ‘Greed’ (with Tavaziva Dance)
- 2014, Empty of You, dir. Konstantina Skalionta, at the Place Theatre in London

== Discography ==
- 2002/03, BT 1.0 (with Betizu Taldea)
- 2003, Garaje Sound (with Betizu Taldea)
- 2004, Bizi Bizi (with Betizu Taldea)

== See also ==
- Betizu
- Betizu Taldea
