= Leitza =

Settlement in Navarre, Spain

Coordinates: 43°04′44″N 1°54′53″W

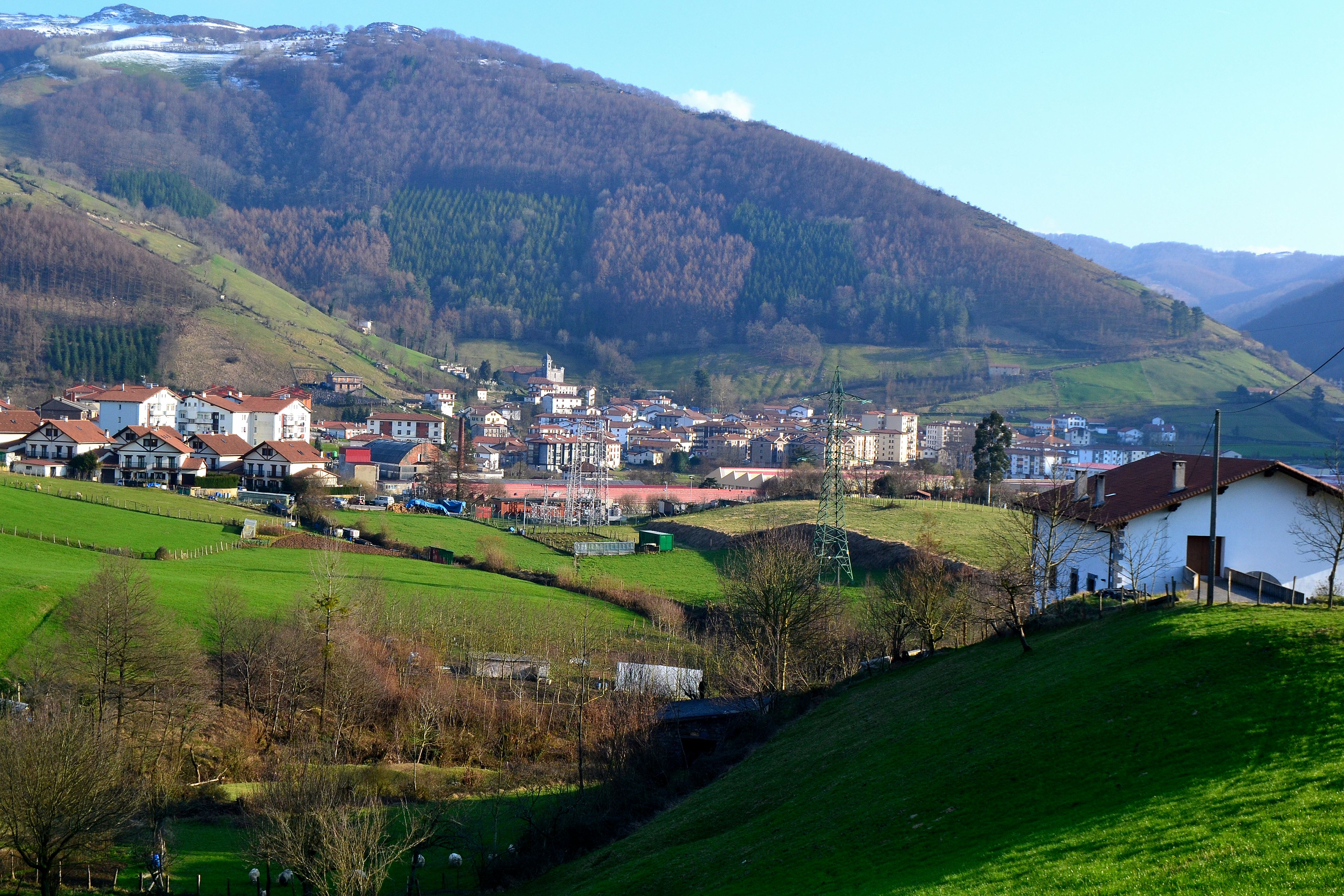
Leitza

Leitza (Spanish: Leiza; Basque: Leitza) is a town and municipality located in the province and autonomous community of Navarre, northern Spain.

== Notable people ==
- Mikel Nieve (born 26 May 1984), professional road cyclist
- Aimar Sagastibelza (born 5 July 1984), footballer
- Beñat Urkiola, singer and bertsolari
