= Betizu (TV series) =

Spanish TV program in Basque language

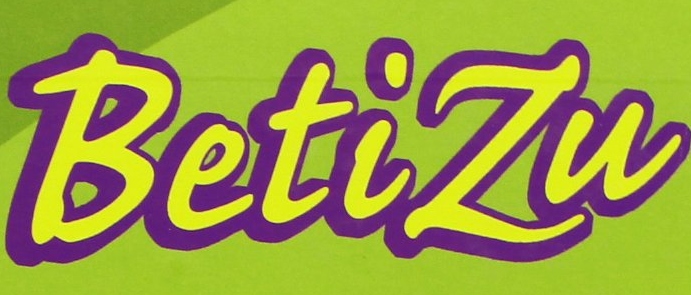
- BetiZu
- Genre: children and adolescent programming
- Based on: Disney Channel
- Written by: Xegun Altolagirre
- Directed by: Juanjo Elordi; Xegun Altolagirre
- Presented by: Nerea Alias; Iban Garate; Jon Gomez; Ilaski Serrano; Joseba Olagarai
- Music by: Juan Carlos Pérez Gómez
- Country of origin: Spain
- Original language: Basque

Production
- Executive producer: Unai Iparragirre Torres
- Producer: Eduardo Barinaga
- Production companies: EITB Media; Baleuko

Original release
- Release: 2001 – 2011

Betizu was a Basque children's and youth television programming, by EITB Media, broadcast by the ETB 1 channel, between 2001 and 2011. It was not a television program itself, but a strip of television programming. It was replaced by the television space Hiru3 (2011–present).

The Betizu television space was a success for the vast majority of the generation of children born in the 90s.

== The Betizu children's and youth programming ==
Betizu was the name of a special programming for children and teenagers on the ETB 1 channel. As at that time (2001–2011) the ETB 1 channel broadcast general content for all audiences (adults, elderly people,...), Betizu was the programming slot for children and youth audiences. In this children's-youth programming (Betizu), different contents were broadcast: programs, cartoons, television series, TV programs, ...

It was similar to the Disney Channel, but in this case it was a slot of programming (not an entire, exclusive channel).

The Betizu space had different presenters such as Nerea Alias, Jon Gomez, Iban Garate, Ilaski Serrano, Joseba Olagarai or Unai Iparragirre.

This space was broadcast practically the entire morning and part of the afternoon and consisted of a variety of content: cartoons, series, contests, programs and others.

As a children's and youth space, it created various products and projects aimed at this audience. Among them:

- The Betizu Club (Betizu Kluba), a club aimed at children with children's activities
- Betizu Taldea - BT (Betizu Group, in Basque), a music group that achieved great notoriety, especially for the hit song "Lokaleko leihotik" or also for the single "Esaidazu"
- Betizu Festival (Betizu Jaialdia, in Basque), a children's and youth festival with concerts, activities and others
- Tours and shows

Like other children's television shows, Betizu created many projects for children such as movies, clubs, theater shows (Betizu Izar artean or Betizu Bizi-Bizi, live Betizu), singing competitions for children... From All of this produced famous artists and musical groups in the Basque Country and Navarra, as well as other products such as records or toys.

The program was produced by Baleuko and EITB Media. The coordinating scriptwriter of the program was Xegun Altolagirre, who would later assume the role of director of the container program, and the director was Juanjo Elordi. The name of the program comes from the native Basque breed of cow Betizu and which also means Beti -Zu (in Basque translated as Siempre Tú, "Beti" always and "Zu" you), for this reason the "Z" was stylized in capital letters.

The Betizu television space was a success for a whole generation of children born in the 1990s.

In 2011, the Betizu television space was replaced by Hiru3, the new EITB children's container space.

== Betizu programming (contents) ==
=== Betizu films ===
- 2003, Betizu izar artean
- 2006, Betizu eta Xangaduko misterioa (premiered at the San Sebastián International Film Festival in 2007)
- 2007, Betizu eta urrezko zintzarria

=== Cartoons ===
- Amaigabeko Istorioa
- Hiru Hirukiak
- Dragoi Ball
- Autobus magikoa
- One piece
- Pernando Amezketarra
- Lazkao Txiki
- Vickie bikingoa
- ...

=== TV shows ===
- Betizu Saioa (presented by Nerea Alias and Jon Gomez)
- Betizuzenean (presented by Iban Garate)
- Gain gaina (presented by Iban Garate)
- Betizu Arena (presented by Iban Garate and Ilaski Serrano)
- Betishow (presented by Iban Garate and Ilaski Serrano)
- Betimu (presented by Ilaski Serrano)
- Show BT (presented by Joseba Olagarai)

=== TV series ===
- Maite Kuttuna

== Betizu Characters ==
- Betizu (female character)
- Betisuis (female character with a French accent)
- M.U. (male character)
- Arrati (male character, bull, in love with Betizu)

== The Betizu Club ==
The Betizu Club (Betizu Kluba) was a project within Betizu launched by EITB aimed at children and young people. It began on November 25, 2001. Children and young people signed up for the club and received a personalized red card with their name. With it they received magazines, invitations, and others.

The club also extended to other different areas such as banking, with a children's savings account called Betizu Izar Libreta (Betizu Star Notebook, in Basque) with a notebook with the Betizu logo that offered different gifts such as books, children's tableware, discounts, interest-free financing and other banking products for children.

== Betizu space (ETB1 and ETB3 channels) and Betizu channel (TV channel) ==
The Betizu program should not be confused with the Betizu Channel (a television channel that replaced the Super Bat Telebista channel). The Betizu program was one of the programs on the ETB 1 channel (one of them). On the other hand, the Betizu Channel was an exclusive channel that only broadcast Betizu content (cartoons, series, contests, programs and others), similar to the Disney Channel in the US. In 2010/11, the ETB 3 channel replaced the Betizu Channel, but the ETB 3 channel kept the Betizu program as one of its spaces (one of its programs), until it was replaced by the Hiru3 program.

The reason for this is that the Betizu Channel was a cable television channel (not open) and ETB 1 was an open channel.

TV programming: Betizu (2001-2010/11) --> Hiru3 (2010/11-...)

Television channels: Betizu Channel (2003-2010/11) --> ETB 3 (2010/11-...)

== Betizu Stars ==
As Betizu was a success for the vast majority of the generation of children born in the 90s, for the child stars who were members of Betizu, their work in Betizu (as presenters, actors, singers, contestants, ...) brought them acclaimed success and made them well known child stars in the Basque Country (Basque Country, Navarre and South of France), becoming well known among the children and the audience.

Among all the artists (children and youth) who were part of any of the Betizu content (presenters, actors, singers, contestants, ...) are, among others: Nerea Alias, Iban Garate, Ilaski Serrano, Jon Gomez, Joseba Olagarai, Zuriñe Hidalgo, Telmo Idígoras, Elene Arandia, Jon Urbieta, Leire Merino, Ainara Epelde, Amane Ibañez, María Ereña, Maialen Diez, Beñat Urkiola, Izar Algueró, ...

Most of them are now adults (practically almost all of them) and are known as former Betizu Stars.

== Controversies ==
The Betizu Stars (presenters, actors, singers, etc.) were children and adolescents (child stars). As adults, some of the Betizu Stars have spoken about the treatment they received on the program when they recorded it.

The singer and presenter Zuriñe Hidalgo was one of the many child Betizu Stars, where she has been since she was 11 years old. In the year 2022, as an adult, she recognized that it was not easy being part of Betizu being so young and criticized the program and the ETB 1 channel for certain facts, declaring that "she suffered discrimination in situations ranging from the way she was dressed, to the way they treated her".

== See also ==
- ETB 1
- ETB 3
- Egin kantu!
