= Betizu Taldea =

- Genres: Basque music Pop music Rock
- Years active: 2002 - 2005/06
- Members: Zuriñe Hidalgo; Telmo Idígoras; Elene Arandia; Jon Urbieta; Leire Merino; Ainara Epelde; Karla Duran; Mikel Zubimendi; Uxue Rodriguez; Amane Ibañez; Saida Rouan

Betizu Taldea - BT (Betizu Group, in Basque language) was a Basque music band.

The band arose from the winners of the contest Betizu of ETB 1 and achieved great notoriety in the Basque Country.

== History ==
The Betizu Taldea - BT band was created in 2002. The group originally arose from the four winners of the Betizu contest Mikel Zubimendi, Ainara Epelde, Leire Merino and Uxue Rodriguez. In 2003 Jon Urbieta and Karla Duran joined the band. In 2004, Zuriñe Hidalgo, Telmo Idígoras, Elene Arandia, Amane Ibañez and Saida Rouan also became members.

Between 2002 and 2005, the BT band released 4 albums and gave several concerts. The group achieved great notability and knowledge, especially for several of its songs that became well known. Especially for the song "Lokaleko leihotik", a single from his third album Bizi Bizi (2004), which was performed by Zuriñe Hidalgo and Telmo Idígoras, and which became one of the most played video clips on the Basque cultural scene. The song was even covered by different artists, including the group Sully Riot. They also achieved great recognition for other singles such as "Esaidazu", part of their first album BT 1.0 (2002/03), "Gora Gora Betizu" or "Kolperik jo gabe".

Due to their great notoriety, they participated as guests in different programs such as the Christmas and New Year's Eve galas of ETB, they gave the chupinazo of some popular festivals,...

In 2021 several members of the band got together again to give a couple of concerts.

== Dissolution ==
In 2005 the BT band released their latest album titled Gazteok. In 2005 the group Betizu Taldea - BT renamed itself as BT-Gazteok or Gazteok, taking the name of its four album (although it was still BT). From that moment BT-Gazteok gave a few more concerts until the middle of 2006.

Finally, the band BT-Gazteok dissolved for good in 2006. The musical space of BT-Gazteok was replaced by the band formed by the four winners of the musical talent show Egin kantu! (Maialen Diez, Oihan Larraza, Beñat Urkiola and Ane Gonzalez), a band that released a couple of albums (one of them had the special collaboration of Telmo Idígoras) and gave different concerts.

== Members ==
- Mikel Zubimendi (2002-2005/06)
- Ainara Epelde (2002-2005/06)
- Leire Merino (2002-2005/06)
- Uxue Rodriguez (2002-2005/06)
- Jon Urbieta (2003-2005/06)
- Karla Duran (2003-2005/06)
- Zuriñe Hidalgo (2004-2005/06)
- Telmo Idígoras (2004-2005/06)
- Elene Arandia (2004-2005/06)
- Amane Ibañez (2004-2005/06)
- Saida Rouan (2004-2005/06)

== Discography ==
* BT 1.0 (2002/03)

* Garaje Sound (2003)

* Bizi Bizi (2004)

* Gazteok (2005)
