= Elene Arandia =

Spanish singer

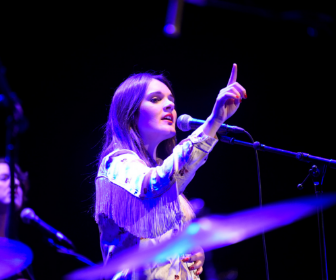
- Born: Elene Arandia Arnal; October 27, 1989 (age 36); Tolosa, Spain
- Citizenship: Spain
- Education: University of Deusto
- Occupation: singer
- Years active: 2006–present
- Notable work: Egin kantu! Betizu

Elene Arandia Arnal (born October 27, 1989) is a Spanish singer and musician.

She made her debut at the age of twelve in Betizu on the ETB 1 channel, being one of several Betizu artists (a former Betizu Star).

== Early life ==
Elene Arandia was born in 1989 in Tolosa, Gipuzkoa, Basque Country (Spain).

== Career ==
She began his television career in 2004 on the Betizu program on the ETB 1 channel where he debuted at just 12 years of age. She was part of the Betizu Taldea music group, along with Zuriñe Hidalgo and Telmo Idígoras.

In 2006 she participated in the hit TV talent show Egin kantu! of ETB 1 as a contestant and singer. Her participation and roles in the hit TV shows Betizu and Egin kantu! brought her acclaimed success and made her a child star in the Basque Country, becoming well known among the children and the audience.

She also participated in programs like Ordu Txikitan and Hator Hator. In 2009 she participated in the ETB 1 Bi Gira contest, along with her cousin, Izaro Saizar, where they managed to reach the final and win the contest.

She studied the bachelor's degree in Communication Humanities at the University of Deusto and has subsequently worked as a communicator and journalist, especially with links to music.

She is currently a singer and session musician. She is the vocalist of the Basque music group Tenpora.

== Discography ==
- 2018, Itzulika

== Filmography ==
=== Television ===
- 2001–2004, Betizu, ETB 1 (actress, singer)
- 2006–2007, Egin kantu!, ETB 1 (contestant, singer)
- 2007–2008, Ordu Txikitan, ETB 1
- 2008–2009, Bi Gira, ETB 1

=== Film ===
- 2015, Nahia

== See also ==
- Betizu
- Betizu Taldea
- Egin kantu!
- Nerea Alias
- Zuriñe Hidalgo
