= Ez Gaitu Inork Geldituko =

Single by Urtz

from the album Aingeru
- Language: Basque
- Released: 2001
- Recorded: 2001
- Genre: Pop, rock
- Length: 4:00
- Label: The Orchard (Sony Music)

"Ez Gaitu Inork Geldituko" (in Basque, No one will stop us) is an official single from the Basque band Urtz from their Album Aingeru.

The song's main theme is perseverance and fighting against adversity. The song became especially well-known during the COVID-19 pandemic due to its use by the Osakidetza-Basque Health System healthcare workers as a hymn of perseverance.

== Background ==
The song was composed and written by Xabi Camarero and Javi Estella, as was the entire album. The song was produced by The Orchard (Sony Music). The song's main themes are perseverance, determination, fighting adversity, and resilience.

As explained by the band Urtz itself, the song was written after several major changes that the music group suffered as a message of perseverance and continuity despite the changes.

== Symphonic format ==
In 2023, the "Ura Bere Bidean Music Festival 2023" chose the song "Ez Gaitu Inork Geldituko" to be performed in symphonic format with the accompaniment of the Bilbao Symphony Orchestra (BOS), conducted by Fernando Velázquez.

== See also ==
- Itoiz
