= Hesian =

Basque rock band

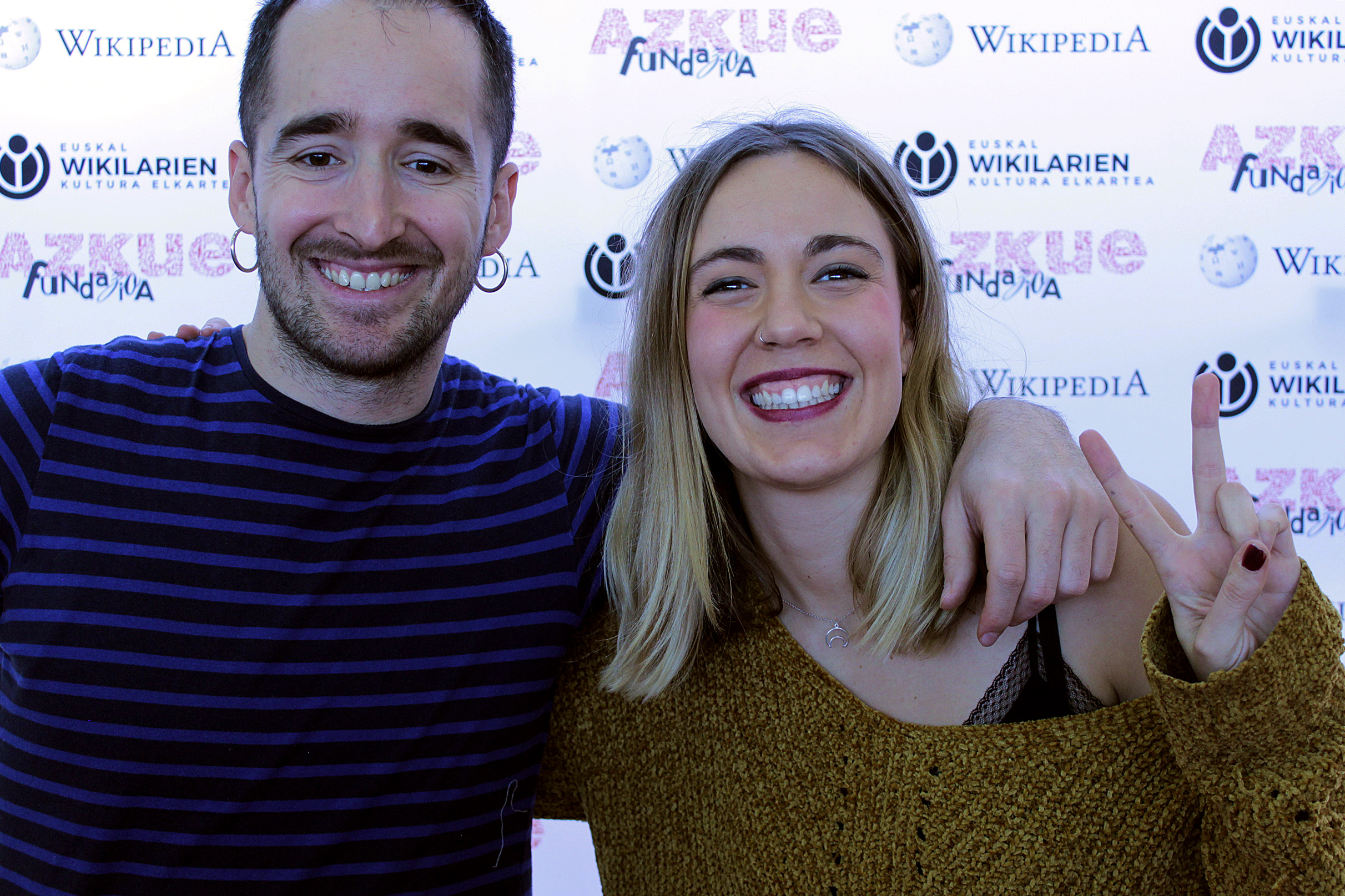
- Singers Fran and Zuriñe from Hesian at the photocall of the Azkue Foundation and the Basque Wikileaks Cultural Association

Background information
- Origin: Etxarri-Aranatz, Navarre, Basque Country
- Genres: Folk rock, folk punk
- Years active: 2006 - 2021
- Members: Fran Urias; Ane Bastida; Danel Ferreño; Zuriñe Hidalgo; Xabier Xabi Larrainzar; Aritz Igotxo Igoa; Eneko Garziandia; Beñat Larrauri

Hesian were a Basque folk rock band created in the spring of 2006. Their music combined elements of punk rock, power pop, and ska punk, and was notable for its use of both female and male vocalists and for singing in the Basque language. The band’s lyrics addressed themes such as everyday life, political conflict in the Basque Country, love, women’s issues, and poverty.

== Formation and early years (2006–2007) ==
Hesian was formed in 2006 by Aritz "Etxebe" Etxeberria (drums), Xabi Seko (bass guitar), and Fran Urias (guitar and vocals). Prior to forming the group, the members had participated in other bands and initially performed covers of artists such as Rancid, Blink-182, No Use for a Name, and The Bouncing Souls. From the outset, the band sought to distinguish itself through the combination of male and female vocals, which was relatively uncommon at the time. Shortly after its formation, Amets Larraza joined the band, followed by Erik Andueza on guitar, completing the initial lineup. During the summer of 2006, the group recorded its first song, “Maite dugu.” Later that year, they recorded “Euskal Herriak autodeterminazioa.” Around this time, the band expanded its sound by incorporating a brass section, with Eneko Garziandia (trumpet), Aritz "Igotxo" Igoa (saxophone), and Buton (trombone) joining the group. These additions became a defining feature of Hesian’s musical style. In June 2007, Hesian recorded its debut album, Maite dugu, at K Studios in Pamplona.

== Growing recognition (2007–2010) ==
Prior to the release of their debut album, Hesian performed approximately ten concerts in the Sakana region. Between 2007 and 2009, the band’s activity increased significantly, with over 100 performances, primarily in the Basque Country, as well as in Catalonia and other parts of Spain.

In October 2008, the band released its second album, Herriaren oihua. Following a brief hiatus in 2009 and several lineup changes, including the addition of Karlos (trombone), Mireia Motxales (vocals), and Xabi Larrainzar (guitar), Hesian recorded its third album, Borrokatu eta irabazi (2010). The album’s title, meaning “Fight and Win,” reflected the challenges the band had faced in establishing itself.

After releasing three albums within four years and performing approximately 150 concerts, the band temporarily ceased live performances.

== Later years and disbandment (2011–2021) ==
Hesian resumed activity in September 2011 with further lineup changes. Zuriñe Hidalgo and Aitor Valcarlos replaced departing members Mireia Motxales and Carlos Azpilikueta. The band subsequently released its fourth album, Hitzetik, followed by Hemen eta orain.

In 2021, after 15 years of activity, Hesian announced its retirement.

== Members ==
- Fran Uribas - vocals, guitar
- Zuriñe Hidalgo - vocals
- Bruno de Zabala - bass guitar
- Danel Ferreño - drums
- Iker Toral - guitar
- Aritz “Igotxo” Igoa - saxophone
- Eneko Garziandia - trumpet
- Aitor “Txamus” Valcarlos - trombone

=== Past members ===
- Xabi Seco - bass guitar (2006-2014)
- Aritz Etxeberria - drums (2006-2014)
- Mikel “Buton” Azpiroz - trombone (2007-2008)
- Erik Andueza - guitar (2006-2009)
- Amets Larraza - vocals (2006-2010)
- Mireia Motxales - vocals (2010)
- Carlos Azpilikueta - trombone (2008-2010)
- Xabi Larrainzar - guitar (2010-?)

== Discography ==
- Maite dugu, 2007
- Herriaren oihua, 2008
- Borrokatu eta irabazi, 2010
- Hitzetik, 2011
- Hemen eta orain, 2013
- Hegalak astinduz, 2014
