= Nerea Alias =

Spanish journalist, actress, TV presenter (born 1984)

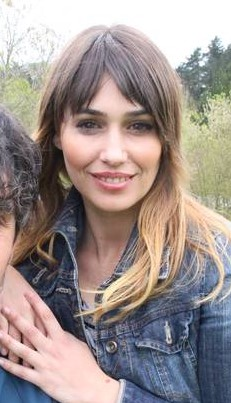
- Born: Nerea Alias García; 2 January 1984 (age 42); Anoeta, Spain
- Occupations: Journalist actress tv presenter
- Years active: 2003–present
- Employers: ETB 1; ETB 2
- Notable work: Betizu; Egin kantu!
- Television: Betizu; Egin kantu! Balbemendi; Sut&Blai; Kontra; Euskal Herria Zuzenean; Kantugiro; De lo bueno mejor Gure kasa Esto no es normal
- Spouse: Xabi Solano (2011-2019)

Nerea Alias García (born 2 January 1984) is a Spanish journalist, actress and TV presenter.

She made her debut at the age of nineteen in Betizu on the ETB 1 channel, being one of several Betizu artists (a former Betizu Star).

== Early life ==
Nerea Alias was born in 1984, Anoeta, Gipuzkoa, Basque Country (Spain).

== Career ==
Nerea Alias started on television in 2003 at the age of nineteen in Betizu on the ETB 1 channel, as the presenter of the program, being one of several Betizu artists (a former Betizu Star). As she herself has stated "I was 19 years old and Betizu was the beginning, beginning to learn about what is my profession today".

She also worked as an actress in the television series Balbemendi. In 2006 she was the presenter the talent show TV show Egin Kantu! from 2006 to 2010.

Since 2008, she was in charge as presenter of the Sut&Blai program, where she stayed for four years. For two seasons she presented the Euskal Herria Zuzenean program on ETB 1 and then one of her last jobs was as a reporter on the Kantugiro program.

In 2006, she worked as a reporter on the program De lo bueno lo mejor. Between 2017 and 2019 she collaborated on the program Gure kasa and currently she presents the television program Esto no es normal on ETB 2 together with Igor Siguero.

In 2024, Alias hosted the program Intimitatean on the Basque streaming platform Primeran, an interview show featuring women from various fields such as Leire Martínez, Aitziber Garmendia, Josune Arakistain, Patrizia Vitelli, and Maddalen Iriarte.

In 2025, Alias and Joseba Olagarai, as former hosts of Betizu, hosted the reunion of the music group Betizu Taldea, fronting the television special "BT 2025. El reencuentro". This marked the group's official reunion after twenty years and featured former members including Elene Arandia, Jon Urbieta, Zuriñe Hidalgo, Telmo Idigoras, Leire Merino, Karla Duran, Saida Rouan, and Ainara Epelde.

== Private life ==
She married Xabi Solano, musician and singer of Esne Beltza (Basque music group), in 2011. They got divorced in 2019.

== Filmography ==
=== TV program ===
- Betizu, ETB 1
- Egin Kantu!, ETB 1
- Sut&Blai, ETB 1
- Kontra, ETB 1
- Euskal Herria Zuzenean, ETB 1
- Kantugiro, ETB 1
- De lo bueno mejor, ETB 2
- Gure kasa, ETB 1
- Esto no es normal, ETB 2

=== TV series ===
- Balbemendi, 2006–2008, ETB 1
- Altsasu (TV series), 2020, ETB 1

== See also ==
- Betizu
- Betizu Taldea
- Egin kantu!
- Elene Arandia
- Zuriñe Hidalgo
- Jon Gomez
