= Maialen Zelaia =

Spanish footballer (born 1988)

Personal information
- Full name: Maialen Zelaia Mendizábal
- Date of birth: 21 August 1988 (age 38)
- Place of birth: San Sebastián, Spain
- Height: 1.66 m (5 ft 5 in)
- Position: Forward

Senior career*
Years	Team	Apps	(Gls)
2003–2007	Añorga		
2007–2017	Real Sociedad		

International career
2008–2017	Basque Country	3	(0)
- * Club domestic league appearances and goals

Maialen Zelaia Mendizábal (born 21 August 1988) is a Spanish retired footballer who played as a forward.
