= Izar Algueró =

Basque actress and author

- Born: Izar Algueró Txibite; 1996 (age 29–30); Navarre, Spain
- Education: University of the Basque Country
- Occupations: Actress; author
- Years active: 2007–present

Izar Algueró Txibite (born 1996) is a Basque actress and author. She has appeared in film and theatre, including Karlos Alastruey's Worldlines and Entre el agua y la tierra, and the stage production Ortentsia izan nahi dut. She is also a co-author of the essay "Sofatik oholtzara", published in the 2019 book Bertsolaritza feminismotik (bir)pentsatzen.

== Early life and education ==
Algueró grew up in Areso, Navarre. In a 2015 interview with Ttipi-Ttapa, when she was 19, she described herself as a social anthropology student in San Sebastián and discussed her involvement in theatre and dance.

She studied social anthropology at the University of the Basque Country.

== Career ==
=== Television and film ===
Algueró took part in the ETB1 talent programme Egin kantu! in 2007.

Her early acting experience included local theatre. In 2015, Ttipi-Ttapa published a profile on Algueró's developing film career after she was cast as one of the protagonists of Karlos Alastruey's Entre el agua y la tierra.

She subsequently appeared in Alastruey's short film Worldlines, playing Izar. She later played Ura in his feature film Entre el agua y la tierra, opposite Irantzu Zugarrondo. The film premiered at the Kimolos International Film Festival in Greece in June 2023. In a 2025 review, UK Film Review identified Algueró's Ura and Zugarrondo's Lur as the film's central characters.

=== Theatre ===
Algueró has also worked in Basque-language theatre. In 2019 she appeared with the Abarka theatre company in Ortentsia izan nahi dut, directed by Ander Lipus, alongside Luis Egurrola, Lur Epelde, Ruben Markina and Nahikari Santano.

=== Writing and bertsolaritza ===
Algueró has also contributed to scholarship and reflection on bertsolaritza. In 2019, together with Maider Arregi Markuleta and Maite Martinez Etxebarria, she wrote the essay "Sofatik oholtzara". It appeared in Bertsolaritza feminismotik (bir)pentsatzen, a collection edited by Miren Artetxe Sarasola and Ane Labaka Mayoz and published by the Basque Summer University (UEU).

== Selected filmography ==
Year	Title	Role	Notes
2016	Worldlines	Izar	Short film
2023	Entre el agua y la tierra	Ura	Feature film

== Stage ==
Year	Title	Director
2019	Ortentsia izan nahi dut	Ander Lipus

== Selected publications ==
- Arregi Markuleta, Maider; Martinez Etxebarria, Maite; Algueró Txibite, Izar (2019). "Sofatik oholtzara". In Artetxe Sarasola, Miren; Labaka Mayoz, Ane (eds.). Bertsolaritza feminismotik (bir)pentsatzen. Bilbao: Udako Euskal Unibertsitatea. pp. 277–295. ISBN 978-84-8438-689-6.
