= ETB 1 =

ETB1
- Country: Spain
- Broadcast area: Basque Country and Navarre
- Network: ETB
- Headquarters: Bilbao, Basque Country

Programming
- Picture format: 1080i HDTV

Ownership
- Owner: EITB
- Sister channels: ETB 2 ETB 3 ETB 4 ETB Basque

History
- Launched: 31 December 1982; 43 years ago (testing); 16 February 1983; 43 years ago (official)
- Former names: ETB (1983–1986)

Links
- Website: eitb.eus/eu/telebista/etb1/

Availability

Terrestrial
- Digital terrestrial television: Álava: Channel 45; Biscay: Channel 35; French Basque Country: Channel 33; Gipuzkoa: Channel 48; Navarre: Channel 26

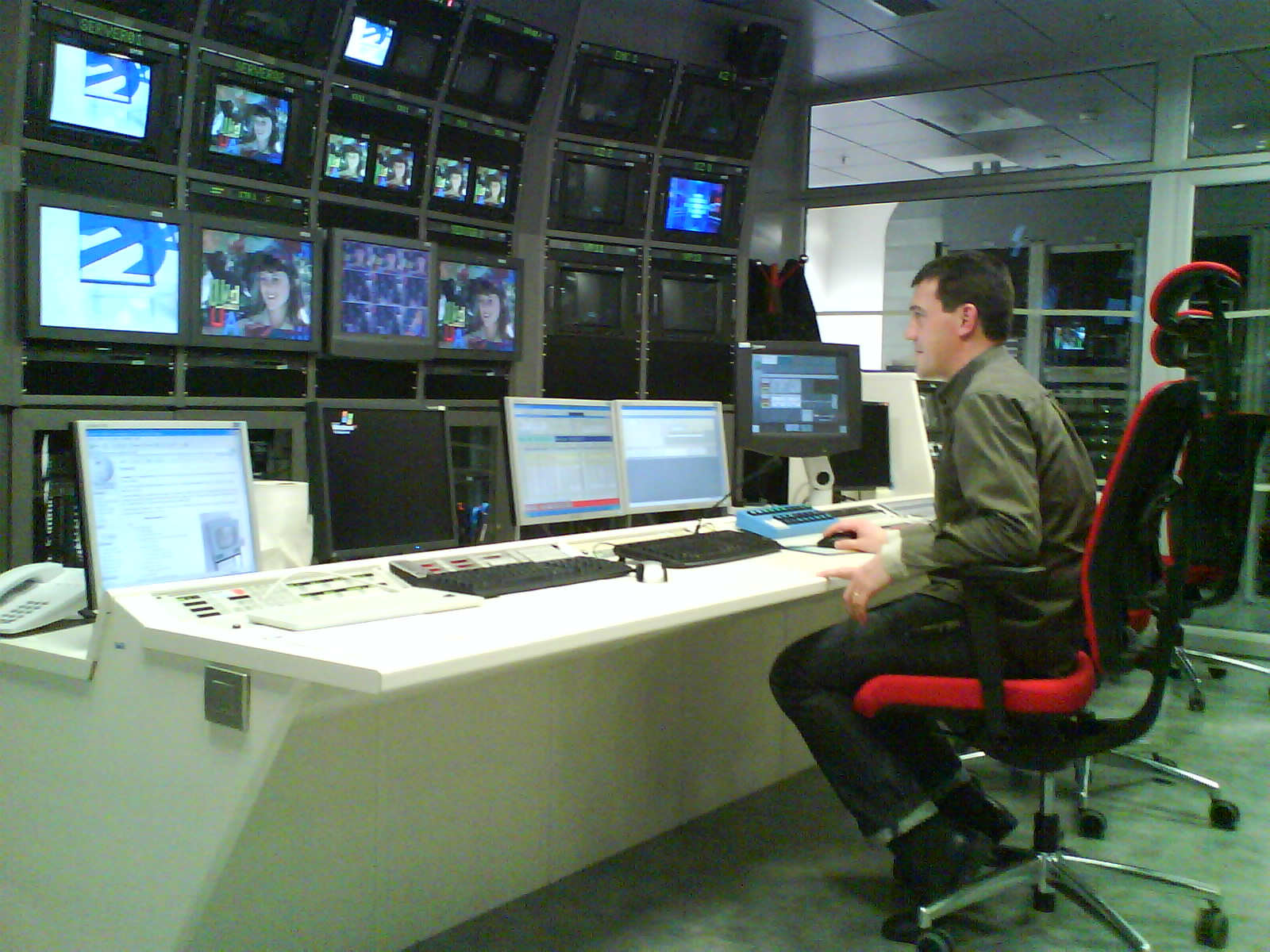
EiTB's television channels control room in Bilbao

ETB 1 (ETB Bat) is the first television channel from the Euskal Irrati Telebista group in the Basque Autonomous Community, Navarre and the French Basque Country.

The channel broadcasts entirely in the Basque language.

== History ==
In 1979 the Statute of Autonomy of the Basque Country was approved, the document contained the possibility of creating broadcast media owned by the Basque government, which would be used for the normalization of the Basque language.

The channel began test transmissions on 31 December 1982 and officially launched on 16 February 1983 as ETB, using this name until the launch of its sister ETB 2 on 31 May 1986, at which point ETB was renamed to ETB 1. An HD feed of ETB 1 was launched on 21 December 2016.

ETB 1 was the first regional channel in Spain, also becoming the first channel to break the monopoly held by TVE 1 and TVE 2.

Its reception area comprises the whole Basque Country — i.e. the Basque Autonomous Community, Navarre and the Northern Basque Country — and some surrounding places.

== Programming ==
Its programming includes: interviews, films, documentaries, sports, youth and children's programmes, making a strong emphasis on sports and children's programming.

The EiTB group's second main television channel, ETB 2, broadcasts in Spanish.

== See also ==
- ETB 2
- ETB 3
- ETB 4
- ETB Sat
- Canal Vasco
- Nerea Alias
- Betizu
- Egin Kantu!
- Euskal Herria Zuzenean
- Gure kasa
