= 1971 European Judo Championships =

1971 Judo European Judo Championships
- Location: Gothenburg, Sweden
- Dates: 22–23 May 1971

Competition at external databases
- Links: JudoInside

The 1971 European Judo Championships were the 20th edition of the European Judo Championships, and were held in Gothenburg, Sweden from 22 to 23 May 1971. Championships were subdivided into six individual competitions, and a separate team competition.

== Medal overview ==
=== Individual ===
Event	Gold	Silver	Bronze
63 kg	(France) Jean-Jacques Mounier	(Soviet Union) Shengeli Pitskhelauri	(Hungary) Ferenc Szabó (East Germany) Karl-Heinz Werner
70 kg	(East Germany) Rudolf Hendel	(Poland) Antoni Zajkowski	(France) Pierre Guichard (Soviet Union) Valery Dvoinikov
80 kg	(France) Guy Auffray	(Soviet Union) Guram Gogolauri	(United Kingdom) Brian Jacks (France) Patrick Clement
93 kg	(East Germany) Helmut Howiller	(Soviet Union) Vladimir Pokataev	(Netherlands) Ernst Eugster (Netherlands) Peter Snijders
93+ kg	(Netherlands) Willem Ruska	(Soviet Union) Valentin Gutsu	(West Germany) Alfred Meier (Soviet Union) Givi Onashvili
Open class	(Soviet Union) Vitaly Kuznetsov	(Spain) Santiago Ojeda	(Netherlands) Henk Kruys (Germany) Reinhard Otto

=== Teams ===
Event	Gold	Silver	Bronze
Team	(United Kingdom) British team: David Lawrence; Edward Cassidy; David Starbrook; Keith Remfry; Angelo Parisi	(Netherlands) Dutch team: Jan Gietelinck; Eddy van der Poel; Martin Poglajen; Ernst Eugster; Willem Ruska	(Soviet Union) Soviet team: Shengeli Pitskhelauri; Valeriy Dvoynikov; Guram Gogolauri; Vladimir Pokatayev; Valentin Gutsu; Vitali Kuznetsov (France) French team: Jean-Jacques Mounier; Pierre Guichard; Guy Auffray; Pierre Albertini; Jean-Claude Brondani; François Besson

=== Medal table ===
Rank	Nation	Gold	Silver	Bronze	Total
1	France	2	0	2	4
2	East Germany	2	0	1	3
3	Soviet Union	1	4	2	7
4	Netherlands	1	0	3	4
5	Poland	0	1	0	1
5	Spain	0	1	0	1
7	West Germany	0	0	2	2
8	Great Britain	0	0	1	1
8	Hungary	0	0	1	1
Totals (9 entries)		6	6	12	24
