= 1972 European Judo Championships =

1972 Judo European Judo Championships
- Location: Voorburg, Netherlands
- Dates: 12–14 May 1972

Competition at external databases
- Links: JudoInside

The 1972 European Judo Championships were the 21st edition of the European Judo Championships, and were held in Voorburg, Netherlands from 12 to 14 May 1972. Championships were subdivided into six individual competitions, and a separate team competition.

== Medal overview ==
=== Individual ===
Event	Gold	Silver	Bronze
63 kg	(France) Jean-Jacques Mounier	(Soviet Union) Sergey Suslin	(Soviet Union) Sergey Melnichenko (East Germany) Karl-Heinz Werner
70 kg	(East Germany) Dietmar Hötger	(Soviet Union) Anatoly Novikov	(Poland) Marian Talaj (Germany) Albert Verhulsdonk
80 kg	(France) Jean-Paul Coche	(Soviet Union) Guram Gogolauri	(Hungary) László Ipacs (Soviet Union) Andrey Tsyupachenko
93 kg	(France) Angelo Parisi	(Netherlands) Jan Bosman	(Netherlands) Ernst Eugster (Soviet Union) Evgeny Solodukhin
93+ kg	(Netherlands) Willem Ruska	(Soviet Union) Givi Onashvili	(Soviet Union) Vitaly Kuznetsov (Spain) Santiago Ojeda
Open class	(Netherlands) Willem Ruska	(France) Jean-Claude Brondani	(East Germany) Klaus Hennig (Soviet Union) Sergey Novikov

=== Teams ===
Event	Gold	Silver	Bronze
Team	(Soviet Union) Soviet team: Sergey Melnichenko; Anatoly Novikov; Sergey Suslin; Guram Gogolauri; Evgeny Solodukhin; Vitali Kuznetsov	(France) French team: Jean-Jacques Mounier; Patrick Vial; Guy Auffray; Jean-Luc Rougé; François Besson	(Netherlands) Dutch team: Jan Gietelinck; Theo Schneider; Martin Poglajen; Ernst Eugster; Willem Ruska; Leo Heynen (United Kingdom) British team: Edward Mullen; Robert Sullivan; Brian Jacks; David Starbrook; Keith Remfry

=== Medal table ===
Rank	Nation	Gold	Silver	Bronze	Total
1	France	3	1	0	4
2	Netherlands	2	1	1	4
3	East Germany	1	0	2	3
4	Soviet Union	0	4	5	9
5	Hungary	0	0	1	1
5	Poland	0	0	1	1
5	Spain	0	0	1	1
5	West Germany	0	0	1	1
Totals (8 entries)		6	6	12	24
