= 1970 European Judo Championships =

1970 Judo European Judo Championships
- Venue: Werner-Seelenbinder-Halle
- Location: East Berlin, East Germany
- Dates: 21–24 May 1970
- Competitors: 200 from 20 nations

Competition at external databases
- Links: JudoInside

The 1970 European Judo Championships were the 19th edition of the European Judo Championships, and were held in East Berlin, East Germany from 21 to 24 May 1970. The championships were divided into six individual competitions and a separate team competition.

== Medal overview ==
=== Individual ===
Event	Gold	Silver	Bronze
63 kg	(France) Jean-Jacques Mounier	(Soviet Union) Sergey Suslin	(East Germany) Dieter Scholz (East Germany) Karl-Heinz Werner
70 kg	(East Germany) Rudolf Hendel	(East Germany) Dietmar Hoetger	(West Germany) Engelbert Dörbandt (United Kingdom) Edward Mullen
80 kg	(United Kingdom) Brian Jacks	(Netherlands) Martin Poglajen	(East Germany) Horst Leupold (East Germany) Otto Smirat
93 kg	(Soviet Union) Vladimir Pokataev	(East Germany) Uwe Stock	(France) Pierre Albertini (Soviet Union) Evgeny Solodukhin
93+ kg	(West Germany) Klaus Glahn	(Netherlands) Willem Ruska	(Netherlands) Dirk Eveleens (East Germany) Heinz Schulze
Open class	(East Germany) Klaus Hennig	(Netherlands) Willem Ruska	(France) Jean-Claude Brondani (Soviet Union) Sergey Novikov

=== Teams ===
Event	Gold	Silver	Bronze
Team	(Soviet Union) Soviet team: Sergey Suslin; David Rudman; Anatoly Bondarenko; Vladimir Pokatayev; Givi Onashvili	(Netherlands) Dutch team: Jan Gietelinck; Eddy van der Poel; Jan Snijders; Peter Snijders; Willem Ruska	(Austria) Austrian team: Erich Butka; Gerold Jungwirth; Lutz Lischka; Eduard Aellig; Heinrich Mayerhofer (France) French team: Serge Feist; Patrick Vial; Guy Auffray; Jean-Paul Coche; Pierre Albertini; Jean-Claude Brondani

=== Medal table ===
Rank	Nation	Gold	Silver	Bronze	Total
1	East Germany	2	2	5	9
2	Soviet Union	1	1	2	4
3	France	1	0	2	3
4	Great Britain	1	0	1	2
4	West Germany	1	0	1	2
6	Netherlands	0	3	1	4
Totals (6 entries)		6	6	12	24
