= Judo at the 1972 Summer Olympics – Men's open category =

Judo competition

Men's Open class at the Games of the XX Olympiad
- Venue: Judo and Wrestling Hall
- Date: 9 September 1972
- Competitors: 26 from 26 nations

Medalists
1st place, gold medalist(s)		Wim Ruska	Netherlands
2nd place, silver medalist(s)		Vitali Kuznetsov	Soviet Union
3rd place, bronze medalist(s)		Jean-Claude Brondani	France
3rd place, bronze medalist(s)		Angelo Parisi	Great Britain

Men's Open class competition in judo at the 1972 Summer Olympics in Munich, West Germany was held at Judo and Wrestling Hall. Wim Ruska was the strong favorite to win a second gold medal, having already won gold in the +93 kg weight class. In a surprise Vitali Kuznetsov threw Ruska defeating him using Te Guruma. Kuznetsov ended up winning the pool allowing Ruska to continue in the repechage. Ruska ended up facing Kuznetsov in the finals where he used a different game plan, using yoko-shiho-gatame to win the match. Ruska retired after the Munich Games being the only judoka to win two gold medals in the same Olympics.

== Results ==
=== Finals ===
Semi-finals
Wim Ruska (NED)	5:02
Jean-Claude Brondani (FRA)	3rd place, bronze medalist(s)
Vitali Kuznetsov (URS)	5:42
Angelo Parisi (GBR)	3rd place, bronze medalist(s)

Final
Wim Ruska (NED)	3:58 (gold)
Vitali Kuznetsov (URS)	2nd place, silver medalist(s)

=== Repechages ===
Repechage		Repechage semifinal		Repechage final
Douglas Rogers (CAN)	0:00
Luvsansharavyn Rentsendorj (MGL)	E DNS	Douglas Rogers (CAN)	6:00
		Tijini Ben Kassow (MAR)	E
				Angelo Parisi (GBR)	6:00
				Douglas Rogers (CAN)	E

Repechage		Repechage semifinal		Repechage final
Barry Johnson (AUS)	E
Chiaki Ishii (BRA)	1:09	Wim Ruska (NED)	4:45
		Chiaki Ishii (BRA)	R
				Wim Ruska (NED)	6:00
				Klaus Glahn (FRG)	E

=== Pool A ===
Round of 32
Petr Jáekl (TCH)	0:00
Kim Euy-Tae (KOR)	E DNS
Angelo Parisi (GBR)	6:00
Klaus Hennig (GDR)	E
Johnny Watts (USA)	0:44
Abdoulaye Djiba (SEN)	E
Pavle Bajčetić (YUG)	5:31
Juang Jen-Wuh (ROC)	E
Jean-Claude Brondani (FRA)	6:00
Douglas Rogers (CAN)	R
Johann Pollak (AUT)	E
Luvsansharavyn Rentsendorj (MGL)	6:00
Juan Marin (PUR)	E DNS
Tijini Ben Kassow (MAR)	0:00
Matthew Folan (IRL)	0:00
BYE

Round of 16
Petr Jáekl (TCH)	E
Angelo Parisi (GBR)	6:00
Johnny Watts (USA)	3:17
Pavle Bajčetić (YUG)	E
Jean-Claude Brondani (FRA)	0:47
Luvsansharavyn Rentsendorj (MGL)	R
Tijini Ben Kassow (MAR)	6:00
Matthew Folan (IRL)	E

Quarterfinal
Angelo Parisi (GBR)	6:00
Johnny Watts (USA)	E
Jean-Claude Brondani (FRA)	2:28
Tijini Ben Kassow (MAR)	R

Semifinal
Angelo Parisi (GBR)	R
Jean-Claude Brondani (FRA)	3:10

=== Pool B ===
Round of 32
Ibrahin Cepro (CUB)	E DNS
Fernando García (PHI)	0:00
Wim Ruska (NED)	2:46
Ulrich Falk (SUI)	E
Barry Johnson (AUS)	R
Vitali Kuznetsov (URS)	4:46
Chiaki Ishii (BRA)	0:00
BYE
Mihály Petrovszky (HUN)	6:00
Epigmenio Exiga (MEX)	E
Klaus Glahn (FRG)	1:53
Pierre Smets (BEL)	E
Santiago Ojeda Perez (ESP)	E
Masatoshi Shinomaki (JPN)	6:00
Antonio Gallina (ARG)	0:00
BYE

Round of 16
Fernando García (PHI)	E
Wim Ruska (NED)	2:23
Vitali Kuznetsov (URS)	2:49
Chiaki Ishii (BRA)	R
Mihály Petrovszky (HUN)	E
Klaus Glahn (FRG)	3:43
Masatoshi Shinomaki (JPN)	1:39
Antonio Gallina (ARG)	E

Quarterfinal
Wim Ruska (NED)	R
Vitali Kuznetsov (URS)	6:00
Klaus Glahn (FRG)	6:00
Masatoshi Shinomaki (JPN)	E

Semifinal
Vitali Kuznetsov (URS)	5:04
Klaus Glahn (FRG)	R
