= 1969 European Judo Championships =

1969 Judo European Judo Championships
- Location: Ostend, Belgium
- Dates: 15–18 May 1969

Competition at external databases
- Links: JudoInside

The 1969 European Judo Championships were the 18th edition of the European Judo Championships, and were held in Ostend, Belgium from 15 to 18 May 1969. Championships were subdivided into six individual competitions, and a separate team competition.

== Medal overview ==
=== Individual ===
Event	Gold	Silver	Bronze
63 kg	(France) Serge Feist	(East Germany) Dieter Scholz	(France) Jean-Jacques Mounier (Socialist Federal Republic of Yugoslavia) Stanko Topolcnik
70 kg	(Soviet Union) David Rudman	(Poland) Antoni Zajkowski	(Poland) Czeslaw Kur (France) Patrick Vial
80 kg	(Soviet Union) Anatoly Bondarenko	(East Germany) Otto Smirat	(Netherlands) Martin Poglajen (Netherlands) Jan Snijders
93 kg	(Netherlands) Peter Snijders	(Soviet Union) Vladimir Pokataev	(Belgium) Martin Segers (France) Pierre Guichard
93+ kg	(Netherlands) Willem Ruska	(Soviet Union) Givi Onashvili	(Austria) Erich Butka (Soviet Union) Vitaly Kuznetsov
Open class	(Netherlands) Willem Ruska	(Soviet Union) Anzor Kibrotsashvili	(Netherlands) Dirk Eveleens (Soviet Union) Vladimir Saunin

=== Teams ===
Event	Gold	Silver	Bronze
Team	(West Germany) West German team: Harry Utzat; Gerd Egger; Wolfgang Hofmann; Peter Herrmann; Alfred Meier	(Netherlands) Dutch team: Jan Gietelinck; Eddy van der Poel; Martin Poglajen; Peter Snijders; Willem Ruska	(Soviet Union) Soviet team: Sergey Suslin; Roin Magaltadze; Anatoly Bondarenko; Viktor Kairis; Vladimir Pokatayev; Vitali Kuznetsov (France) French team: Serge Feist; Pierre Guichard; Jacques Noris; Jean-Luc Rougé; François Besson

=== Medal table ===
Rank	Nation	Gold	Silver	Bronze	Total
1	Netherlands (NED)	3	0	3	6
2	Soviet Union (URS)	2	3	2	7
3	France (FRA)	1	0	3	4
4	East Germany (DDR)	0	2	0	2
5	Poland (POL)	0	1	1	2
6	Austria (AUT)	0	0	1	1
6	Belgium (BEL)	0	0	1	1
6	Yugoslavia (YUG)	0	0	1	1
Totals (8 entries)		6	6	12	24
