= Karl-Heinz Werner =

East German judoka

Personal information
- Nationality: East German
- Born: 17 September 1949 (age 76) Rodewisch, East Germany
- Height: 1.69 m (5 ft 6 1/2 in)

Sport
- Sport: Judo
- Event: Lightweight / Half-lightweight

Karl-Heinz Werner (born 17 September 1949) is a retired East German judoka who competed in the lightweight (up to 63 kg) and half-lightweight (up to 65 kg) divisions. He won five bronze medals at the European Judo Championships between 1970 and 1974 and represented East Germany at the 1972 Summer Olympics in Munich.

== Early career ==
Werner was born in Rodewisch in Saxony. Standing 1.69 m (5 ft 6 1/2 in), he competed in the lightweight class (up to 63 kg) until 1976; after a reorganisation of weight categories, he moved to the half-lightweight class (up to 65 kg) in 1977. He was selected for the youth squad of the German Judo Federation by trainer Willi Lorbeer and won the Cadet European Championships in 1967.

Werner was a member of ASK Vorwärts Berlin before transferring to ASK Vorwärts Frankfurt in 1973, where he trained under Hubert Sturm and Herbert Niemann.

== Competitive career ==
=== European Championships ===
Werner won his first European Championship bronze medal at the 1970 Europeans in East Berlin, followed by a second bronze at the 1971 Europeans in Gothenburg. At the 1972 Europeans in Voorburg, he earned a third individual bronze. At the 1973 Europeans in Madrid, Werner defeated Jean-Jacques Mounier of France in the round of 16 and József Tuncsik of Hungary in the quarter-finals before losing his semi-final to Shengeli Pizchelauri of the Soviet Union. He defeated Branko Vidmajer of Yugoslavia in the bronze-medal match for his fourth individual bronze. He won a fifth bronze medal as part of the East German team at the 1974 Europeans in London.

=== World Championships ===
Werner competed at two World Judo Championships. At the 1971 Worlds in Ludwigshafen, he was eliminated in his first bout by the Swiss judoka Peter Wiler. At the 1973 Worlds in Lausanne, he reached the quarter-finals before losing to the Frenchman Michel Algisi.

=== 1972 Olympics ===
At the 1972 Summer Olympics in Munich, Werner competed in the men's lightweight event. In the first round, he defeated Moustafa Belhmira of Morocco by judges' decision (yusei-gachi). In the second round, he beat Gustaaf Lauwereins of Belgium after 4 minutes 21 seconds. He was eliminated in the third round by Wolfram Koppen of West Germany, again by judges' decision, finishing in 11th place.

Event	Preliminary rounds			Final ranking
Event	Round of 32	Round of 16	Quarter-final	Place
63 kg	(Morocco) Moustafa Belhmira (MAR); W (yusei-gachi)	(Belgium) Gustaaf Lauwereins (BEL); W (4:21)	(West Germany) Wolfram Koppen (FRG); L (yusei-gachi)	11th

=== DDR Championships ===
In the East German national championships, Werner finished second in the lightweight class in 1969 and 1970, behind Dieter Scholz of SC Dynamo Hoppegarten. He won his first national title in 1972, lost to Scholz again in 1973, and won a second title in 1974. In 1976, he was defeated by Ingolf Lahr of SC Dynamo Hoppegarten. After the weight-class reorganisation, Werner won the 1977 DDR Championship in the half-lightweight division.

=== Other results ===
Werner won the Dutch Open in April 1972. His last international tournament victory came in 1977 in Pleven, Bulgaria.
