= 1967 European Judo Championships =

1967 Judo European Judo Championships
- Location: Rome, Italy
- Dates: 11–13 May 1967

Competition at external databases
- Links: JudoInside

The 1967 European Judo Championships were the 16th edition of the European Judo Championships, and were held in Rome, Italy from 11 to 13 May 1967. Championships were subdivided into six individual competitions, and a separate team competition.

== Medal overview ==
=== Individual ===
Event	Gold	Silver	Bronze
63 kg	(Soviet Union) Sergey Suslin	(Belgium) Gustaaf Lauwereins	(United Kingdom) George Glass (Soviet Union) Nickolay Kozitsky
70 kg	(France) Armand Desmet	(Netherlands) Eddy van der Pol	(East Germany) Joachim Schroeder (Netherlands) Tonny Jonkman
80 kg	(Soviet Union) Vladimir Pokataev	(United Kingdom) George Kerr	(United Kingdom) Brian Jacks (France) Patrick Clement
93 kg	(West Germany) Peter Herrmann	(France) Pierre Albertini	(United Kingdom) Ray Ross (Soviet Union) Boris Mischenko
93+ kg	(Netherlands) Willem Ruska	(Soviet Union) Anzor Kibrotsashvili	(East Germany) Klaus Hennig (Soviet Union) Vasily Usik
Open class	(Netherlands) Anton Geesink	(Soviet Union) Anzor Kiknadze	(Netherlands) Willem Ruska (East Germany) Klaus Hennig

=== Teams ===
Event	Gold	Silver	Bronze
Team	(East Germany) East German team: Harry Utzat; Gerd Egger; Ferdinand Miebach; Peter Herrmann; Klaus Glahn	(France) French team: Serge Feist; Armand Desmet; Patrick Clément; Pierre Albertini; Georges Gress	(Soviet Union) Soviet team: Sergey Suslin; Oleg Stepanov; Anatoli Bondarenko; Anatoly Yudin; Anzor Kiknadze (Netherlands) Dutch team: Jan Gietelinck; Tony Jonkman; Martin Poglajen; Peter Snijders; Anton Geesink

=== Medal table ===
Rank	Nation	Gold	Silver	Bronze	Total
1	Soviet Union (URS)	2	2	3	7
2	Netherlands (NED)	2	1	2	5
3	France (FRA)	1	1	1	3
4	West Germany (FRG)	1	0	0	1
5	Great Britain (GBR)	0	1	3	4
6	Belgium (BEL)	0	1	0	1
7	East Germany (DDR)	0	0	3	3
Totals (7 entries)		6	6	12	24
