= 1968 European Judo Championships =

1968 Judo European Judo Championships
- Location: Lausanne, Switzerland
- Dates: 17–19 May 1968

Competition at external databases
- Links: JudoInside

The 1968 European Judo Championships were the 17th edition of the European Judo Championships, and were held in Lausanne, Switzerland from 17 to 19 May 1968. Championships were subdivided into six individual competitions, and a separate team competition.

== Medal overview ==
=== Individual ===
Event	Gold	Silver	Bronze
63 kg	(Soviet Union) Piruz Martkoplishvili	(Soviet Union) Sergey Suslin	(France) Serge Feist (France) Denis Pylypiw
70 kg	(Soviet Union) Roin Magaltadze	(Soviet Union) Otari Natelashvili	(Poland) Czeslaw Kur (United Kingdom) Allan Wood
80 kg	(West Germany) Wolfgang Hofmann	(France) Ahmed Khan	(East Germany) Horst Leupold (West Germany) Ferdi Miebach
93 kg	(West Germany) Peter Herrmann	(East Germany) Helmut Howiller	(Netherlands) Ernst Eugster (West Germany) Paul Barth
93+ kg	(West Germany) Klaus Glahn	(Soviet Union) Anzor Kiknadze	(West Germany) Alfred Meier (Austria) Erich Butka
Open class	(Soviet Union) Vladimir Saunin	(Socialist Federal Republic of Yugoslavia) Radovan Krajinovic	(West Germany) Guenther Monczyk (East Germany) Klaus Hennig

=== Teams ===
Event	Gold	Silver	Bronze
Team	(France) French team: Serge Feist; Pierre Guichard; Patrick Clément; Jean-Paul Coche; Jean-Claude Brondani	(Soviet Union) Soviet team: Sergey Suslin; Otari Natelashvili; Aleksandr Suklin; Vladimir Pokatayev; Anzor Kibrotsashvili	(West Germany) West German team: Harry Utzat; Gerd Egger; Wolfgang Hofmann; Peter Herrmann; Klaus Glahn (Netherlands) Dutch team: Jan Gietelinck; Tony Jonkman; Jan Snijders; Ernst Eugster; Peter Snijders

=== Medal table ===
Rank	Nation	Gold	Silver	Bronze	Total
1	Soviet Union (URS)	3	3	0	6
2	West Germany (FRG)	3	0	3	6
3	East Germany (DDR)	0	1	3	4
4	France (FRA)	0	1	2	3
5	Yugoslavia (YUG)	0	1	0	1
6	Austria (AUT)	0	0	1	1
6	Great Britain (GBR)	0	0	1	1
6	Netherlands (NED)	0	0	1	1
6	Poland (POL)	0	0	1	1
Totals (9 entries)		6	6	12	24
