= Foullon =

Foullon is a French surname. Notable people with the surname include:

- Abel Foullon (1513–1563 or 1565), French writer and engineer
- Joseph Foullon de Doué (1715–1789), French politician
- Rachel Foullon (born 1978), American artist
- Raúl Foullon (born 1955), Mexican judoka

== See also ==
- Foulon
