= 1972 Summer Olympics medal table =

1972 Summer Olympics medals
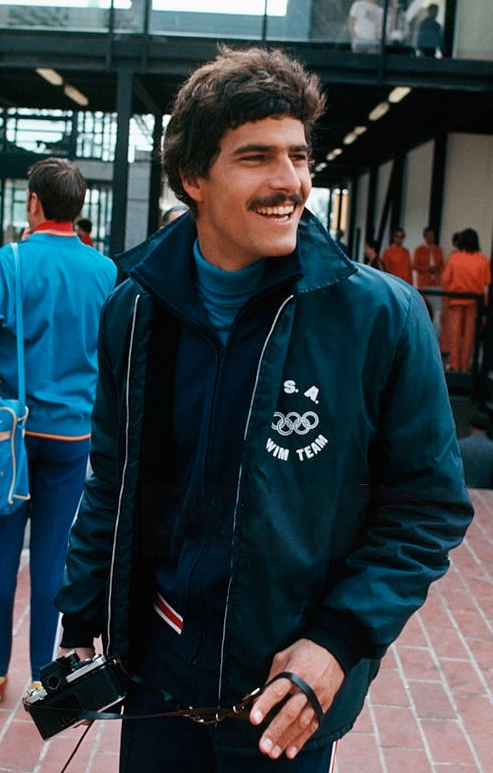
- Mark Spitz won seven gold medals at the 1972 Summer Olympics, the most of any competing athlete.
- Location: Munich, West Germany

Highlights
- Most gold medals: Soviet Union (50)
- Most total medals: Soviet Union (99)
- Medalling NOCs: 48

World map showing the medal achievements of each country during the 1972 Summer Olympics Legend: represents countries that won at least one gold medal. represents countries that won at least one silver medal but no gold medals. represents countries that won at least one bronze medal (no gold or silver). represents participating countries that did not win medals. represents entities that did not participate at the 1972 Summer Olympics.

The 1972 Summer Olympics, officially known as the Games of the XX Olympiad, were a summer multi-sport event held in Munich, West Germany, from 26 August through 11 September 1972. 7,134 athletes representing 121 National Olympic Committees (NOCs) participated, which included 11 teams making their debut at the Summer Olympics: Albania, Dahomey (now Benin), Gabon, North Korea, Lesotho, Malawi, Saudi Arabia, Somalia, Swaziland (now Eswatini), Togo, and Upper Volta (now Burkina Faso). The games featured 195 events in 21 sports across 27 disciplines. Kayaking, the canoe slalom, and indoor handball all made their Olympic debuts, while archery returned to the Olympic program after a 52-year hiatus.

Rhodesia had been barred from participating at the 1968 Games due to racial policies and threats by athletes to boycott the event, but in 1971, the International Olympic Committee (IOC) ruled that Rhodesia would be invited to compete at the 1972 Olympic Games. Athletes from other African nations protested this invitation and again threatened to boycott the games over those policies. Four days before the opening ceremonies, the IOC voted to rescind their invitation and exclude the Rhodesian athletes.

Athletes representing 48 NOCs received at least one medal, with 25 NOCs winning at least one gold medal. The Soviet Union won the most gold medals, with 50, and the most overall medals, with 99. North Korea and Uganda won their nations' first Summer Olympic gold medals, which was the first medal of any kind at the Summer Olympics for North Korea. Colombia and Niger also won their nations' first Olympic medals of any kind.

Among individual participants, American swimmer Mark Spitz won the most medals at the games with seven, all of which were gold. Spitz also became the record holder for most gold medals at a single Olympic Games, a record that stood for 36 years until American swimmer Michael Phelps surpassed that mark with eight gold medals at the 2008 Summer Olympics.

== Medal table ==
The medal table is based on information provided by the IOC and is consistent with IOC conventional sorting in its published medal tables. The table uses the Olympic medal table sorting method. By default, the table is ordered by the number of gold medals the athletes from a nation have won, where a nation is an entity represented by a NOC. The number of silver medals is taken into consideration next and then the number of bronze medals. If teams are still tied, equal ranking is given and they are listed alphabetically by their IOC country code.

At the 1972 Games, events in boxing resulted in bronze medals being awarded to each of the competitors who lost their semi-final matches, as opposed to them taking part in a third place tiebreaker. Events in judo used a repechage system, which also resulted in two bronze medals being awarded.

In the women's uneven bars, there was a two-way tie for second, resulting in two silver medals being issued and no bronze medal being awarded. In men's football, the third-place match ended in a tie, resulting in both teams receiving bronze medals.

Key

‡ Changes in medal standings (see below)

* Host nation (West Germany)

1972 Summer Olympics medal table
Rank	NOC	Gold	Silver	Bronze	Total
1	Soviet Union	50	27	22	99
2	United States‡	33	31	30	94
3	East Germany	20	23	23	66
4	West Germany*	13	11	16	40
5	Japan	13	8	8	29
6	Australia‡	8	7	2	17
7	Poland	7	5	9	21
8	Hungary	6	13	16	35
9	Bulgaria	6	10	5	21
10	Italy	5	3	10	18
11	Sweden	4	6	6	16
12	Great Britain	4	5	9	18
13	Romania	3	6	7	16
14	Cuba	3	1	4	8
14	Finland	3	1	4	8
16	Netherlands‡	3	1	1	5
17	France	2	4	7	13
18	Czechoslovakia	2	4	2	8
19	Kenya	2	3	4	9
20	Yugoslavia	2	1	2	5
21	Norway	2	1	1	4
22	North Korea	1	1	3	5
23	New Zealand	1	1	1	3
24	Uganda	1	1	0	2
25	Denmark	1	0	0	1
26	Switzerland	0	3	0	3
27	Canada	0	2	3	5
28	Iran	0	2	1	3
29	Belgium	0	2	0	2
29	Greece	0	2	0	2
31	Austria	0	1	2	3
31	Colombia	0	1	2	3
33	Argentina	0	1	0	1
33	Lebanon	0	1	0	1
33	Mexico	0	1	0	1
33	Mongolia‡	0	1	0	1
33	Pakistan	0	1	0	1
33	South Korea	0	1	0	1
33	Tunisia	0	1	0	1
33	Turkey	0	1	0	1
41	Brazil	0	0	2	2
41	Ethiopia	0	0	2	2
43	Ghana	0	0	1	1
43	India	0	0	1	1
43	Jamaica	0	0	1	1
43	Niger	0	0	1	1
43	Nigeria	0	0	1	1
43	Spain‡	0	0	1	1
Totals (48 entries)		195	195	210	600

== Changes in medal standings ==
List of official changes in medal standings
Event	Athlete (NOC)	1st place, gold medalist(s)	2nd place, silver medalist(s)	3rd place, bronze medalist(s)	Net change	Comment
Cycling, men's individual road race	Jaime Huélamo (ESP) DSQ			–1	–1	Jaime Huélamo was disqualified for doping violations. New Zealand's Bruce Biddle finished fourth, but was not awarded the bronze due to stipulations that medal winners had to be drug tested. Biddle had tried to get tested following the race on the advice of his team's manager, in the event of a disqualification, but he was turned away.
Cycling, men's team time trial	Fedor den Hertog (NED)			–1	–1	Aad van den Hoek was disqualified for doping violations, causing the entire Dutch cycling team to lose their medals, as it was a team event. The Belgian team finished fourth, but did not receive the bronze medals because they had not been subjected to drug testing, a requirement for medal winners at the time.
Cycling, men's team time trial	Hennie Kuiper (NED)			–1	–1	Aad van den Hoek was disqualified for doping violations, causing the entire Dutch cycling team to lose their medals, as it was a team event. The Belgian team finished fourth, but did not receive the bronze medals because they had not been subjected to drug testing, a requirement for medal winners at the time.
Cycling, men's team time trial	Cees Priem (NED)			–1	–1	Aad van den Hoek was disqualified for doping violations, causing the entire Dutch cycling team to lose their medals, as it was a team event. The Belgian team finished fourth, but did not receive the bronze medals because they had not been subjected to drug testing, a requirement for medal winners at the time.
Cycling, men's team time trial	Aad van den Hoek (NED) DSQ			–1	–1	Aad van den Hoek was disqualified for doping violations, causing the entire Dutch cycling team to lose their medals, as it was a team event. The Belgian team finished fourth, but did not receive the bronze medals because they had not been subjected to drug testing, a requirement for medal winners at the time.
Judo, men's 63 kg	Bakhvain Buyadaa (MGL) DSQ		–1		–1	Bakhvain Buyadaa was disqualified for doping violations. Neither athlete who finished third was awarded the silver, which is considered vacant.
Swimming, men's 400 metre freestyle	Rick DeMont (USA) DSQ	–1			–1	Rick DeMont was disqualified after testing positive for ephedrine, a substance which was found in DeMont's asthma medication. DeMont had declared his asthma medication to the team, but the team had failed to clear it with the IOC, leading to his gold medal being stripped from him.
Swimming, men's 400 metre freestyle	Brad Cooper (AUS)	+1	–1		0	Rick DeMont was disqualified after testing positive for ephedrine, a substance which was found in DeMont's asthma medication. DeMont had declared his asthma medication to the team, but the team had failed to clear it with the IOC, leading to his gold medal being stripped from him.
Swimming, men's 400 metre freestyle	Steve Genter (USA)		+1	–1	0	Rick DeMont was disqualified after testing positive for ephedrine, a substance which was found in DeMont's asthma medication. DeMont had declared his asthma medication to the team, but the team had failed to clear it with the IOC, leading to his gold medal being stripped from him.
Swimming, men's 400 metre freestyle	Tom McBreen (USA)			+1	+1	Rick DeMont was disqualified after testing positive for ephedrine, a substance which was found in DeMont's asthma medication. DeMont had declared his asthma medication to the team, but the team had failed to clear it with the IOC, leading to his gold medal being stripped from him.

List of official changes by country
NOC	Gold	Silver	Bronze	Net change
Australia	+1	–1		0
Mongolia		–1		–1
Netherlands			–1	–1
Spain			–1	–1
United States	–1	+1		0

== See also ==
- List of 1972 Summer Olympics medal winners
- All-time Olympic Games medal table
- 1972 Winter Olympics medal table
- 1972 Summer Paralympics medal table
