= Takao Kawaguchi =

Japanese judoka (born 1950)

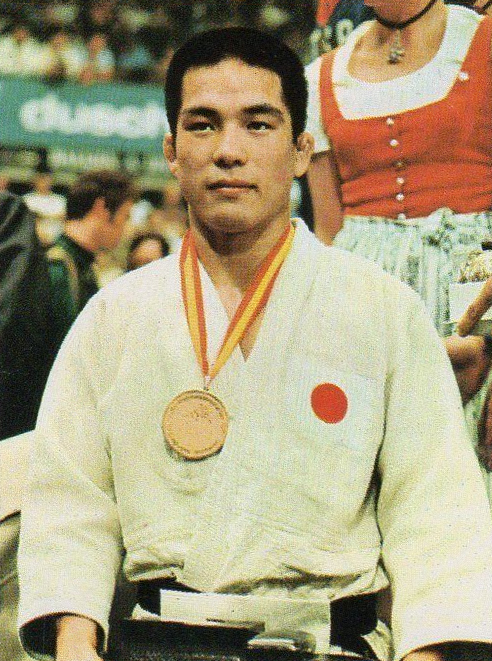

Personal information
- Born: 13 April 1950 (age 76) Hiroshima, Japan
- Education: Meiji University
- Occupation: Judoka
- Height: 1.64 m (5 ft 5 in)

Sport
- Country: Japan
- Sport: Judo
- Weight class: ‍–‍63 kg
- Coached by: Akio Kaminaga

Achievements and titles
- Olympic Games: (gold) (1972)
- World Champ.: (1971)
- Asian Champ.: (gold) (1972)
Medal record
Men's judo
Representing Japan
Olympic Games
Gold medal – first place	1972 Munich	‍–‍63 kg
World Championships
Gold medal – first place	1971 Ludwigshafen	‍–‍63 kg
Silver medal – second place	1973 Lausanne	‍–‍63 kg
Asian Championships
Gold medal – first place	1972 Kaohsiung	‍–‍63 kg

Profile at external databases
- IJF: 14357
- JudoInside.com: 5402
- Updated on 22 June 2023

Takao Kawaguchi (川口 孝夫, Kawaguchi Takao; born 13 April 1950) is a retired judoka who competed in the ‍–‍63 kg division.

== Biography ==
Kawaguchi began training in judo at age 5 under his father, who was a local judo coach. He later won an inter-highschool judo tournament, and in 1969 entered Meiji University. In 1971 he defeated the future Olympic gold medalist Toyokazu Nomura in the world championship final, and became the Japanese representative for the ‍–‍63 kg division at the 1972 Summer Olympics. After two quick victories in the first and second rounds of the Olympic competition, Kawaguchi faced Mongolian judoka Bakhvain Buyadaa in the third round, and broke two ribs while escaping from Buidaa's ground pin. Coach Akio Kaminaga suggested Kawaguchi to withdraw, but Kawaguchi continued, and advanced to the semifinal with a close decision victory. He won the semifinal against Kim Yong-Ik of North Korea with a yoko-shiho-gatame, only to face Buidaa in the final. In contrast to their previous bout, Kawaguchi quickly pinned Buidaa with a kouchi gari, and won with a kami-shiho-gatame within 39 seconds. Buidaa was later disqualified for failing a drug test.

After retiring from competitions Kawaguchi succeeded his father as head of the Kawaguchi dojo. In 2007, the dojo was sued by parents of a boy, who died after hitting the back of his head during the training. The Hiroshima District Court found that Kawaguchi did not follow required safety procedures and ordered him to pay 24 million yen in compensation.

== See also ==
- List of judoka
- List of Olympic medalists in judo
