= Ferenc Szabó (judoka) =

Hungarian judoka (1948–2025)

Personal information
- Born: 18 September 1948 Pécs, Hungary
- Died: 26 March 2025 (aged 76)
- Occupation: Judoka

Sport
- Country: Hungary
- Sport: Judo
- Weight class: ‍–‍60 kg, ‍–‍63 kg, ‍–‍65 kg
- Rank: 7th dan black belt

Achievements and titles
- Olympic Games: 7th (1972)
- World Champ.: 7th (1971)
- European Champ.: (silver) (1977, 1978)
Medal record
Men's judo
Representing Hungary
European Championships
Silver medal – second place	1977 Ludwigshafen	‍–‍65 kg
Silver medal – second place	1978 Helsinki	‍–‍60 kg
Bronze medal – third place	1971 Göteborg	‍–‍63 kg
European Junior Championships
Silver medal – second place	1968 London	‍–‍63 kg

Profile at external databases
- IJF: 4779
- JudoInside.com: 2713
- Updated on 1 April 2025

Ferenc Szabó (18 September 1948 – 26 March 2025) was a Hungarian judoka who competed in the men's lightweight event at the 1972 Summer Olympics. He died on 26 March 2025, at the age of 76.
