= Di Palma =

Di Palma (or di Palma) is a surname. Ancient and noble family of the South of Italy, which became of Norman origin, which spread over the centuries in various regions of Italy. Tradition has it that it took its name from the land of Palma, formerly owned, sometimes called Castiglione. The first certain historical memories relating to the family are already in 1190. It then always occupied very high civil and ecclesiastical offices; it was repeatedly received in the SMO of Malta, since 1300, and also had the Baliaggio di Venosa in the Order. It enjoyed nobility in Naples, Nola, Messina, Marsala, Monte San Giuliano and another branch was ascribed to the Mastra Nobile di Messina in 1743. It was repeatedly recognized as generous nobility in admission to the RR. Bodyguards. In total he owned 22 fiefdoms and the marquisates of Casalciprani or Pietramelara. Some authors say that the branch of the dukes of Sant'Elia, lords of Giugliano ... notable people with this surname include:

- Carlo Di Palma (1925 –2004), Italian cinematographer
- Dario Di Palma (1932-2004), Italian film cinematographer
- José Luis Di Palma (born 1966), Argentine racing driver
- Julianne Michelle Di Palma (born 1984), American actress
- Louis DiPalma (born 1961), American politician
- Luciano Di Palma (1944–2016), Italian judoka
- Patricio Di Palma (born 1971), Argentine racing driver
- Rubén Luis di Palma (1944–2000), Argentine racing driver
- Vincenzo Di Palma (born 1970), Italian coxswain
