= Auffray =

Auffray or Aufray is a surname, and may refer to:

- André Auffray (1884–1953), French racing cyclist
- Charles Auffray (born 1973), French tennis player
- Guy Auffray (1945–2021), French judoka
- Hugues Aufray (born 1929), French singer-songwriter and guitarist
- Marie-Thérèse Auffray (1912–1990), French painter and World War II Resistance member

== See also ==
- Auffret
