= Foulon =

Foulon is a French surname. Notable people with the surname include:

- Celia Foulon (born 1979), French rower
- Daam Foulon (born 1999), Belgian footballer
- Emmanuel Foulon (1871–1945), Belgian archer
- Gwenn Foulon (born 1998), French footballer
- Joseph-Alfred Foulon (1823–1893), French cardinal
- Jérôme Foulon (born 1971), French footballer
- Maurice Foulon (1886–1968), French politician
- Olivier Foulon (born 1976), Belgian artist
- Roger Foulon (1923–2008), Belgian writer
- Séverine Foulon (born 1973), French middle-distance runner

== See also ==
- Foullon
