= Sung-chul (name) =

- Hangul: 성철
- RR: Seongcheol
- MR: Sŏngch'ŏl

Sung-chul, also spelled Seong-cheol or Song-chol, is a Korean given name.

People with this name include:

== Politicians ==
- Pak Song-chol (1913–2008), North Korean politician, premier from 1976 to 1977
- Yang Sung-chul (born 1939), South Korean political scientist, politician, and diplomat
- Kim Song-chol (politician) (fl. 2010s), North Korean politician and general

== Sportspeople ==
- Han Seong-cheol (born 1948), South Korean judo practitioner
- Nam Song-chol (born 1982), North Korean international footballer
- Pak Song-chol (athlete) (born 1984), North Korean long-distance runner
- Ri Song-chol (born 1986), North Korean figure skater
- Pak Song-chol (footballer, born 1987), North Korean international footballer (DPR Korea Premier Football League, Cambodian Premier League)
- Son Seong-cheol (born 1987), South Korean springboard diver
- Pak Song-chol (footballer, born 1991), North Korean footballer (DPR Korea Premier Football League)
- Kim Song-chol (weightlifter) (born 1993), North Korean weightlifter

== Others ==
- Seongcheol, dharma name of Yi Yeongju (1912–1993), South Korean Seon Buddhist master
- Shin Sung-chul (born 1952), South Korean physicist
- Kim Sung-cheol (born 1991), South Korean actor

== See also ==
- List of Korean given names
