= Dietmar Hötger =

East German judoka

Personal information
- Born: 8 June 1947 (age 79)
- Occupation: Judoka

Sport
- Country: East Germany
- Sport: Judo
- Weight class: ‍–‍70 kg

Achievements and titles
- Olympic Games: (bronze) (1972)
- World Champ.: (silver) (1973)
- European Champ.: (gold) (1972, 1973)
Medal record
Men's judo
Representing East Germany
Olympic Games
Bronze medal – third place	1972 Munich	‍–‍70 kg
World Championships
Silver medal – second place	1973 Lausanne	‍–‍70 kg
Bronze medal – third place	1971 Ludwigshafen	‍–‍70 kg
European Championships
Gold medal – first place	1972 Voorburg	‍–‍70 kg
Gold medal – first place	1973 Madrid	‍–‍70 kg
Silver medal – second place	1970 Berlin	‍–‍70 kg
Silver medal – second place	1976 Kyiv	‍–‍70 kg
Bronze medal – third place	1975 Lyon	‍–‍70 kg

Profile at external databases
- IJF: 54364
- JudoInside.com: 5594
- Updated on 22 June 2023

Dietmar Hötger (born 8 June 1947 in Hoyerswerda) is a German judoka, who competed for the SC Dynamo Berlin / Sportvereinigung (SV) Dynamo. He won medals at international competitions.
