= Judo at the 1967 Summer Universiade =

Judo competition

Judo Judo at the 1967 Summer Universiade
- Location: Tokyo, Japan
- Date: 1967

Medalists
| gold medal | Japan (1st title) |
| silver medal | South Korea |
| bronze medal | France |

Champions
- Men's team: Japan (1st title)

Competition at external databases
- Links: JudoInside

The Judo competition in the 1967 Summer Universiade were held in Tokyo, Japan.

== Medal overview ==
=== Events ===
| Event | Gold | Silver | Bronze |
|---|---|---|---|
| Extra-lightweight (63 kg) | Yoshio Sonoda (JPN) | Yoon Soo-Kyoon (KOR) | Rob Boom (NED) |
| Extra-lightweight (63 kg) | Yoshio Sonoda (JPN) | Yoon Soo-Kyoon (KOR) | Murilo Figueiredo (BRA) |
| Half-lightweight (70 kg) | Yujiro Yamasaki (JPN) | Park Chung-Sam (KOR) | Pierre Guichard (FRA) |
| Half-lightweight (70 kg) | Yujiro Yamasaki (JPN) | Park Chung-Sam (KOR) | Matheus Sugizaki (BRA) |
| Lightweight (80 kg) | Isamu Sonoda (JPN) | Oh Seung-Lip (KOR) | F. Almeida (POR) |
| Lightweight (80 kg) | Isamu Sonoda (JPN) | Oh Seung-Lip (KOR) | T. Garrett (GBR) |
| Half-middleweight (93 kg) | Kazuhiro Ninomiya (JPN) | Kim Jung-Haeng (KOR) | Pierre Albertini (FRA) |
| Half-middleweight (93 kg) | Kazuhiro Ninomiya (JPN) | Kim Jung-Haeng (KOR) | Mike Concannon (GBR) |
| Heavyweight (+93 kg) | Motoki Nishimura (JPN) | Kim Chung-Joo (KOR) | Jean-Claude Brondani (FRA) |
| Heavyweight (+93 kg) | Motoki Nishimura (JPN) | Kim Chung-Joo (KOR) | Howard Fish (USA) |
| Openweight | Masatoshi Shinomaki (JPN) | Kim Chung-Joo (KOR) | Tony Atmadjaja (INA) |
| Openweight | Masatoshi Shinomaki (JPN) | Kim Chung-Joo (KOR) | Howard Fish (USA) |
| Team | Japan | South Korea | Brazil |
| Team | Japan | South Korea | France |

=== Medals table ===
| Rank | Nation | Gold | Silver | Bronze | Total |
|---|---|---|---|---|---|
| 1 | Japan (JPN) | 7 | 0 | 0 | 7 |
| 2 | South Korea (KOR) | 0 | 7 | 0 | 7 |
| 3 | France (FRA) | 0 | 0 | 4 | 4 |
| 4 | Brazil (BRA) | 0 | 0 | 3 | 3 |
| 5 | Great Britain (GBR) | 0 | 0 | 2 | 2 |
| 5 | United States (USA) | 0 | 0 | 2 | 2 |
| 7 | Indonesia (INA) | 0 | 0 | 1 | 1 |
| 7 | Netherlands (NED) | 0 | 0 | 1 | 1 |
| 7 | Portugal (POR) | 0 | 0 | 1 | 1 |
| Totals (9 entries) | | 7 | 7 | 14 | 28 |
