= Uwe Stock =

German judoka

Medal record

Men's judo

European Championships
Silver medal – second place	1970 Berlin	Light heavyweight

Uwe Stock (born 5 December 1947) is a German judo athlete, who competed for the SC Dynamo Berlin / Sportvereinigung (SV) Dynamo. He won medals at national and international competitions. In 1973 he took over the GDR-Championtitel from Helmut Howiller.

Stock was born in Wustrow.
