= Reto Zinsli =

Swiss judoka

Personal information
- Nationality: Swiss
- Born: 12 January 1952 (age 73)

Sport
- Sport: Judo

Reto Zinsli (born 12 January 1952) is a Swiss judoka. He competed in the men's half-middleweight event at the 1972 Summer Olympics.
