= Cheng Chi-hsiang =

Taiwanese judoka

Personal information
- Full name: 鄭 吉祥, Pinyin: Zhèng Jí-xiáng
- Nationality: Taiwanese
- Born: 4 May 1949 (age 75)

Sport
- Sport: Judo

Cheng Chi-hsiang (born 4 May 1949) is a Taiwanese judoka. He competed in the men's lightweight event at the 1972 Summer Olympics.
