= Kazuo Yoshimura =

Japanese judoka

Personal information
- Born: 6 July 1951 (age 74)
- Occupation: Judoka

Sport
- Sport: Judo
Medal record
Representing Japan
Men's Judo
World Championships
| Bronze medal – third place | 1973 Lausanne | -70 kg |

Profile at external databases
- JudoInside.com: 5511

Kazuo Yoshimura (吉村 和郎, Yoshimura Kazuo; born 6 July 1951) is a retired Japanese judoka.

Yoshimura is from Kumamoto, Kumamoto. He belonged to Tokyo Metropolitan Police Department after graduation from Nihon University in 1973.

In 1973, When Yoshimura was a student of university, he won a bronze medal at the World Championships held in Lausanne.

He was expected to get gold medal of World Championships in 1977 or Olympic Games in 1980. But he couldn't because World Championship was cancelled and Olympic Games was boycotted by Japanese Government.

Yoshimura retired in 1980 and took office as the coach of Kodogakusha (講道学舎, Kōdōgakusha). Among his students is former world champion, Toshihiko Koga and Hidehiko Yoshida.

As of 2010, He has coached All-Japan women's judo team since 1997. In November 2012 he resigned as the women's trainer and was replaced by Hitoshi Saito.

== Achievements ==
- 1969 - Inter-highschool championships (-80 kg) 1st
- 1970 - All-Japan Junior Championships (-63 kg) 3rd
- 1971 - All-Japan Junior Championships (-80 kg) 1st
- 1972 - All-Japan Selected Championships (-70 kg) 3rd
- 1973 - World Championships (-70 kg) 3rd
- 1976 - All-Japan Selected Championships (-70 kg) 2nd
- 1976 - Kodokan Cup (-71 kg) 1st
- 1977 - All-Japan Selected Championships (-71 kg) 1st
- 1978 - Jigoro Kano Cup (-71 kg) 1st
- 1978 - All-Japan Selected Championships (-71 kg) 2nd
- 1979 - Super World Cup Paris (-71 kg) 1st
- 1979 - All-Japan Selected Championships (-71 kg) 2nd
