= Geronimo Dyogi =

Filipina judoka

Personal information
- Full name: Geronimo Samonte Dyogi
- Nationality: Filipino
- Born: July 20, 1949 Manila, Philippines
- Died: July 23, 2016 (aged 67) Sugar Land, Texas, U.S.
- Occupation: Judoka
- Height: 5 ft 6 in (167 cm)
- Weight: 150 lb (70 kg)

Sport
- Sport: Judo

Geronimo "Ronnie" Samonte Dyogi (July 20, 1949 – July 23, 2016) was a Filipino judoka. He competed in the men's half-middleweight event at the 1972 Summer Olympics.

== Early life ==
Dyogi was born in Manila, Philippines on July 20, 1949, to Ramon Dyogi Sr. and Aurora Samonte. Since his father is a diplomat, Dyogi spent most of his childhood in various parts of Asia, outside the Philippines. He and his family resided in Japan when he was age 6 to 12. He was initially involved in freestyle wrestling but switched to judo when he was residing in Japan. He attended Mapúa Institute of Technology.

== Career ==
Dyogi attended the Kodokan Institute where he trained in Judo. At age 15, he attained the rank of first dan and received his black belt. At the 1954 Asian Games which was hosted in Manila, he won a bronze medal. He finished third in 1966, 1970, and 1974 editions of the Asian Judo Championships. At the 1969 World Championships in Mexico he finished in fifth place while in the 1971 edition he finished in 7th place. At the 1972 Summer Olympic Games in Munich he finished tenth.

== Later life ==
After retiring from competitive sports, Geronimo Dyogi settled in the United States with his family. He worked as an automobile mechanic and managed his own auto repair business. He later moved from California to Texas, where he worked for the City of West University Place until his retirement. Dyogi died on July 23, 2016, in Sugar Land, Texas.

== Personal life ==
Geronimo Dyogi married Evelyn in 1977, whom he met in San Francisco, California in 1973. They had two children.
