= Louis Rabetrano =

Malagasy judoka

Personal information
- Nationality: Malagasy
- Born: 3 July 1954 (age 70)

Sport
- Sport: Judo

Louis Rabetrano (born 3 July 1954) is a Malagasy judoka. He competed in the men's lightweight event at the 1972 Summer Olympics.
