= Wang Jong-she =

Taiwanese judoka

Personal information
- Full name: 王 榮錫, Pinyin: Wáng Róng-xī
- Nationality: Taiwanese
- Born: 19 July 1949 (age 75)

Sport
- Sport: Judo

Wang Jong-she (born 19 July 1949) is a Taiwanese judoka. He competed in the men's half-middleweight event at the 1972 Summer Olympics.
