= Antal Hetényi =

Hungarian judoka (1947–2023)

Personal information
- Full name: Antal Gábor Hetényi
- Born: 6 October 1947; Budapest, Hungary
- Died: 5 March 2023 (aged 75)
- Height: 170 cm (5 ft 7 in)
- Weight: 70 kg (154 lb)

Sport
- Country: Hungary
- Sport: Judo

Antal Gábor Hetényi (6 October 1947 – 5 March 2023) was a Hungarian judoka. He competed in the men's half-middleweight event at the 1972 Summer Olympics.

Hetényi died on 5 March 2023, at the age of 75.
