= Rudolf Hendel =

German judoka (1947–2023)

Personal information
- Nationality: German
- Born: 21 September 1947 Rodewisch, Saxony, Allied-occupied Germany
- Died: 17 July 2023 (aged 75) Frankfurt an der Oder, Germany
- Occupation: Judoka

Sport
- Sport: Judo
Medal record
Men's judo
Representing East Germany
European Championships
Gold medal – first place	1970 Berlin	‍–‍70 kg
Gold medal – first place	1971 Göteborg	‍–‍70 kg

Profile at external databases
- JudoInside.com: 5591
- Updated on 27 April 2024

Rudolf Hendel (21 September 1947 – 17 July 2023) was a German judoka. He competed in the men's middleweight event at the 1972 Summer Olympics.

Hendel died in Frankfurt an der Oder on 17 July 2023, at the age of 75.
