= Robert Van De Weyer =

Belgian judoka

Personal information
- Nationality: Belgian
- Born: 9 November 1945 (age 79); Wilrijk, Belgium

Sport
- Sport: Judo

Robert Van De Weyer (born 9 November 1945) is a Belgian judoka. He competed in the men's half-middleweight event at the 1972 Summer Olympics.
