= Erwin García =

Nicaraguan judoka (born 1949)

Personal information
- Nationality: Nicaraguan
- Born: 13 September 1949 (age 75)

Sport
- Sport: Judo

Erwin García (born 13 September 1949) is a Nicaraguan judoka. He competed in the men's half-middleweight event at the 1972 Summer Olympics.
