= Wolfram Koppen =

German judoka

Personal information
- Nationality: German
- Born: 1 February 1939 Hamburg, Germany
- Died: 17 April 2011 (aged 72)
- Occupation: Judoka

Sport
- Country: West Germany
- Sport: Judo
- Weight class: ‍–‍63 kg

Achievements and titles
- Olympic Games: 5th (1972)

Profile at external databases
- IJF: 54457
- JudoInside.com: 8709
- Updated on 24 June 2023

Wolfram Koppen (1 February 1939 – 17 April 2011) was a German judoka. He competed in the men's lightweight event at the 1972 Summer Olympics.
