= David Rudman (wrestler) =

Wrestler and martial artist (1943–2022)

Personal information
- Citizenship: Soviet
- Born: April 13, 1943 Kuybyshev, RSFSR, Soviet Union (now Samara, Russia)
- Died: February 8, 2022 (aged 78)
- Occupation(s): Wrestler, sambist, and judoka
- Agent: 6x USSR wrestling champion; Sambo world champion, and 6x USSR champion; 2x European Judo Champion, and world bronze medalist

Sport
- Club: Dynamo sports society
Medal record
Representing the Soviet Union
Men's Judo
World Championships
Bronze medal – third place	1969 Mexico City	70 kg
European Championships
Gold medal – first place	1969 Ostend	70 kg
Gold medal – first place	1970 East Berlin	70 kg team
Men's Sambo
World Championships
Gold medal – first place	1973 Tehran	68 kg

David Rudman (April 13, 1943 – February 8, 2022) was a Russian-American wrestler, Sambo world champion, and judo European champion.

== Early and personal life ==
Rudman was born in Kuybyshev (now Samara, Russia). He emigrated to the United States in 1994, and lived in New York City, where was involved in sports administration. Rudman died on February 8, 2022, at the age of 78.

== Wrestling career ==
He was a member of the sport association "Dynamo".

In 1965–69 and 1973, he was the USSR Wrestling Champion at 70 kg. He was second in the USSR championship at 70 kg in 1970–72, and third in 1974.

== Sambo career ==
In 1967, he was the Champion of the first International Sambo Tournament, at 70 kg. Rudman described sambo as "is a combination of many forms of martial arts, designed to give Soviet soldiers the edge in combat fighting". In 1973, he was the first World Champion in the weight category up to 68 kg. He was a six-time USSR sambo champion.

== Judo career ==
In 1969, he was the European Judo Champion in individual competition as a light-middleweight (U70), winning all of his matches in Ostend, Belgium, ahead of Antoni Zajkowski and Czeslaw Kur of Poland, and Patrick Vial of France. He won a bronze medal in the 1969 World Judo Championships in Mexico City in the U70 weight class. In 1970, he was part of the European Team Judo Champion at the championships in Berlin, fighting in the U70 weight class.

== Sports administrator ==
Rudman founded and served as director of the "Sambo-70" sports school in the Cheremushki District of Moscow.

He was the President of the American Amateur Sambo Federation since 2004, and President of the Federation International Amateur Sambo from 2005 on.

== Honors ==
Rudman was an Honored Master of Sports of the USSR, and an Honored Coach of the USSR.
