= Anatoliy Novikov =

Ukrainian judoka (1947–2022)

Personal information
- Full name: Anatoliy Terentiyovych Novikov
- Born: 17 January 1947
- Died: 19 January 2022 (aged 75)
- Occupation: Judoka

Sport
- Country: Soviet Union
- Sport: Judo
- Weight class: ‍–‍70 kg

Achievements and titles
- Olympic Games: (bronze) (1972)
- World Champ.: (bronze) (1973)
- European Champ.: (silver) (1972)
Medal record
Men's judo
Representing Soviet Union
Olympic Games
Bronze medal – third place	1972 Munich	‍–‍70 kg
World Championships
Bronze medal – third place	1973 Lausanne	‍–‍70 kg
European Championships
Silver medal – second place	1972 Voorburg	‍–‍70 kg

Profile at external databases
- IJF: 54484
- JudoInside.com: 5865
- Updated on 22 June 2023

Anatoliy Terentiyovych Novikov (Ukrainian: Анатолій Терентійович Новіков; 17 January 1947 – 18 January 2022) was a Ukrainian judoka who competed for the Soviet Union at the 1972 Summer Olympics.

Novikov was born in Kharkiv on 17 January 1947. Novikov won a bronze medal in the half middleweight class at the 1972 Summer Olympics. He died on 19 January 2022, at the age of 75.
