= Klaus Hennig =

German judoka (born 1944)

Personal information
- Born: 27 January 1944 (age 82)
- Occupation: Judoka

Sport
- Sport: Judo
Medal record
Men's judo
European Championships
Gold medal – first place	1970 Berlin	All category
Bronze medal – third place	1966 Luxembourg	Heavyweight
Bronze medal – third place	1967 Rome	Heavyweight
Bronze medal – third place	1967 Rome	All category
Bronze medal – third place	1968 Lausanne	Heavyweight
Bronze medal – third place	1972 Voorburg	Heavyweight

Profile at external databases
- JudoInside.com: 5592

Klaus Hennig (born 27 January 1944) is a German judo athlete, who competed for the SC Dynamo Hoppegarten / Sportvereinigung (SV) Dynamo. He won medals at international competitions included over 15 national titles. He also competed in two events at the 1972 Summer Olympics.
