= Douglas Churchill =

Australian judoka

Personal information
- Nationality: Australian
- Born: 7 November 1948
- Died: 5 October 2021 (aged 72)

Sport
- Sport: Judo

Douglas Churchill (7 November 1948 – 5 October 2021) was an Australian judoka. He competed in the men's half-middleweight event at the 1972 Summer Olympics.
