= Bakhvain Buyadaa =

Mongolian judoka (born 1946)

Personal information
- Born: Бахвайн Буядаа; 20 May 1946 (age 80)
- Height: 1.72 m (5 ft 8 in)
- Weight: 63 kg (139 lb)

Sport
- Sport: Judo
Medal record
Olympic Games
Disqualified	1972 Munich	-63 kg

Bakhvain Buyadaa (born 20 May 1946) is a retired Mongolian judoka who competed at the 1972 and 1976 Olympics. He finished second in 1972, but tested positive for Dianabol, an anabolic steroid, and was disqualified, becoming the first Olympic judoka to fail a drug test. He finished in tenth place in 1976.

Buyadaa came to the 1972 Olympics with a freestyle wrestling background and no firm knowledge of judo rules. Yet he won his first two bouts, and was close to beating the reigning world champion Takao Kawaguchi in the third. Kawaguchi broke two ribs while escaping from the ground pin by Buyadaa, but managed to win by close decision. In the repechage Buyadaa won against another favorite, Jean-Jacques Mounier. He quickly lost the final to Kawaguchi, and was stripped of his silver medal for failing a drug test.
