= 1969 World Judo Championships =

Judo competition

Judo 1969 Men's World Judo Championships
- Venue: Palacio de los Deportes
- Location: Mexico City, Mexico
- Dates: 23–25 October 1969
- Competitors: 187 from 39 nations

Competition at external databases
- Links: IJF • JudoInside

The 1969 World Judo Championships were the sixth edition of the men's World Judo Championships, and were held in Mexico City, Mexico from 23–25 October, 1969.

== Medal overview ==
=== Men ===
Event	Gold	Silver	Bronze
-63 kg	(Japan) Yoshio Sonoda	(Japan) Toyokazu Nomura	(South Korea) Kim Sang-Chul (Soviet Union) Sergey Suslin
-70 kg	(Japan) Hiroshi Minatoya	(Japan) Yoshimitsu Kono	(South Korea) Kim Chil-Bok (Soviet Union) David Rudman
-80 kg	(Japan) Isamu Sonoda	(Japan) Katsuya Hirao	(South Korea) Oh Seung-Lip (Netherlands) Martin Poglajen
-93 kg	(Japan) Fumio Sasahara	(Germany) Peter Herrmann	(Japan) Tomoyuki Kawabata (Soviet Union) Vladimir Pokatayev
+93 kg	(Japan) Shuji Suma	(Germany) Klaus Glahn	(Japan) Mitsuo Matsunaga (Soviet Union) Givi Onashvili
Open	(Japan) Masatoshi Shinomaki	(Netherlands) Wim Ruska	(Netherlands) Ernst Eugster (Japan) Nobuyuki Sato

=== Medal table ===
Rank	Nation	Gold	Silver	Bronze	Total
1	Japan (JPN)	6	3	3	12
2	West Germany (FRG)	0	2	0	2
3	Netherlands (NED)	0	1	2	3
4	Soviet Union (URS)	0	0	4	4
5	South Korea (KOR)	0	0	3	3
Totals (5 entries)		6	6	12	24
