= Renato Repuyan =

Filipino judoka

Personal information
- Nationality: Filipino
- Born: October 22, 1944 (age 81)
- Height: 5 ft 7 in (170 cm)
- Weight: 137 lb (62 kg)

Sport
- Sport: Judo

Bernardino Renato Repuyan (born October 22, 1944) is a Filipino judoka. He competed in the men's lightweight event at the 1972 Summer Olympics.
