= Juan Chalas =

Dominican judoka

Personal information
- Nationality: Dominican
- Born: 7 July 1956 (age 68)

Sport
- Sport: Judo

Juan Chalas (born 7 July 1956) is a Dominican judoka. He competed in the men's lightweight event at the 1972 Summer Olympics.
