= Liam Carroll (judoka) =

Irish judoka

Personal information
- Nationality: Irish
- Born: 6 June 1946
- Died: September 2024 (aged 78)
- Occupation: Judoka

Sport
- Sport: Judo

Liam Carroll (6 June 1946 – September 2024) was an Irish judoka. He competed in the men's half-middleweight event at the 1972 Summer Olympics.
