= Armin Büchel =

Liechtenstein judoka (born 1945)

Personal information
- Nationality: Liechtenstein
- Born: 15 July 1945 (age 79)
- Died: 8 May 1994
- Occupation: Judoka

Sport
- Sport: Judo

Profile at external databases
- JudoInside.com: 8665

Armin Büchel (born 15 July 1945) is a Liechtenstein judoka. He competed in the men's half-middleweight event at the 1972 Summer Olympics.
