= Jang In-gwon =

South Korean judoka

Personal information
- Nationality: South Korean
- Born: 17 November 1945 (age 79)

Sport
- Sport: Judo

Jang In-gwon (born 17 November 1945) is a South Korean judoka. He competed in the men's half-middleweight event at the 1972 Summer Olympics.
