= Anto Clarke =

Irish judoka (1944–2019)

Personal information
- Full name: Anthony Clarke
- Nationality: Irish
- Born: 19 January 1944
- Died: 2 June 2019 (aged 75)
- Occupation: Judoka
- Height: 165 cm (5 ft 5 in)
- Weight: 63 kg (139 lb)

Sport
- Sport: Judo

Profile at external databases
- IJF: 54473
- JudoInside.com: 8680

Anthony "Anto" Clarke (19 January 1944 – 2 June 2019) was an Irish judoka. He competed in the men's lightweight event at the 1972 Summer Olympics.
