= Xavier Boissy =

Senegalese judoka

Personal information
- Nationality: Senegalese
- Born: 27 May 1944 (age 82)

Sport
- Sport: Judo

Xavier Boissy (born 27 May 1944) is a Senegalese judoka. He competed in the men's lightweight event at the 1972 Summer Olympics.

== Early life ==
Xavier was born on 27 May 1944 to a Senegalese father and a Lebanese mother.
