= Howard Fish =

American judoka

Personal information
- Born: December 26, 1940 Flint, Michigan, United States
- Died: June 7, 2019 (aged 78) San Jose, California, United States

Sport
- Sport: Judo
Medal record
Representing United States
Summer Universiade
Bronze medal – third place	1967 Tokyo	Heavyweight

Howard Lewis Fish (December 26, 1940 – June 7, 2019) was a former competitive judo who fought for the United States. He was a left-handed fighter. He won gold in the 1965 National Collegiate Championships.

In 1967, Fish defeated future Olympian Allan Coage. He appeared on the 1968 cover of Black Belt Magazine. In 1968, Fish received a four month scholarship from Black Belt Magazine in order to train at the Kodokan. He represented San Jose State and the USA in the 1968 World University Judo Games, where he won two bronze medals. Fish was the only representative of the United States in this tournament.

Howard won bronze in the 1966 US National Championships, and gold in the 1967 US National Championships.

== Personal life ==
Fish initially attended General Motors Institute of Technology before transferring to San Jose State.

Fish died on June 7, 2019 following a long battle of myelofibrosis, a rare form of leukemia.
