= Justin Andriamanantena =

Malagasy judoka (born 1942)

Personal information
- Nationality: Malagasy
- Born: 25 August 1942 (age 82)

Sport
- Sport: Judo

Justin Andriamanantena (born 25 August 1942) is a Malagasy judoka. He competed in the men's half-middleweight event at the 1972 Summer Olympics.
