= Judo at the 1972 Summer Olympics – Men's 70 kg =

Judo competition

Men's 70kg at the Games of the XX Olympiad
- Venue: Judo and Wrestling Hall
- Date: 3 September 1972
- Competitors: 28 from 28 nations

Medalists
1st place, gold medalist(s)		Toyokazu Nomura	Japan
2nd place, silver medalist(s)		Antoni Zajkowski	Poland
3rd place, bronze medalist(s)		Dietmar Hötger	East Germany
3rd place, bronze medalist(s)		Anatoliy Novikov	Soviet Union

Men's 70 kg competition in judo at the 1972 Summer Olympics in Munich, West Germany was held at Judo and Wrestling Hall.

== Results ==
=== Finals ===
Semi-finals
Antoni Zajkowski (POL)	8:00
Dietmar Hötger (GDR)	3rd place, bronze medalist(s)
Toyokazu Nomura (JPN)	3:39
Anatoliy Novikov (URS)	3rd place, bronze medalist(s)

Final
Toyokazu Nomura (JPN)	0:27 (gold)
Antoni Zajkowski (POL)	2nd place, silver medalist(s)

=== Repechages ===
Repechage		Repechage semifinal		Repechage final
Reto Zinsli (SUI)	3:00
Justin Andriamanantena (MAD)	E	Engelbert Dörbrandt (FRG)	6:00
		Reto Zinsli (SUI)	E
				Engelbert Dörbrandt (FRG)	E
				Anatoliy Novikov (URS)	4:34

Repechage		Repechage final
Antal Hetényi (HUN)	4:49
Wang Jong-she (ROC)	E	Antal Hetényi (HUN)	E
		Antoni Zajkowski (POL)	6:00

=== Pool A ===
Round of 32
Patrick Burris (USA)	E
Engelbert Dörbrandt (FRG)	6:00
Damirangiin Baatarjav (MGL)	E
António Roquete (POR)	2:52
Reto Zinsli (SUI)	R
Dietmar Hötger (GDR)	5:42
Joze Skraba (YUG)	DNS
Justin Andriamanantena (MAD)	0:00
Gerold Jungwirth (AUT)	1:22
Armin Büchel (LIE)	E
Mok Cheuk Wing (HKG)
Geronimo Dyogi (PHI)	6:00
Raúl Foullon (MEX)	0:49
Babacar Sidibé (SEN)	E
Anatoliy Novikov (URS)
BYE

Round of 16
Engelbert Dörbrandt (FRG)	2:35
António Roquete (POR)	E
Dietmar Hötger (GDR)	1:40
Justin Andriamanantena (MAD)	R
Gerold Jungwirth (AUT)	6:00
Geronimo Dyogi (PHI)	E
Raúl Foullon (MEX)	E
Anatoliy Novikov (URS)	1:46

Quarterfinal
Engelbert Dörbrandt (FRG)	R
Dietmar Hötger (GDR)	6:00
Gerold Jungwirth (AUT)	E
Anatoliy Novikov (URS)	1:46

Semifinal
Dietmar Hötger (GDR)	6:00
Anatoliy Novikov (URS)	R

=== Pool B ===
Round of 32
Antal Hetényi (HUN)	2:04
Robert Sullivan (GBR)	E
Douglas Churchill (AUS)	6:00
Robert Van De Weyer (BEL)	E
Wang Jong-she (ROC)	6:00
William McGregor (CAN)	E
Toyokazu Nomura (JPN)
BYE
Luciano Di Palma (ITA)	E
Jang In-gwon (KOR)	6:00
Liam Carroll (IRL)	E
Patrick Vial (FRA)	1:29
Erwin García (NCA)	E
Antoni Zajkowski (POL)	1:04
Gustavo Brito (PUR)
BYE

Round of 16
Antal Hetényi (HUN)	6:00
Douglas Churchill (AUS)	E
Wang Jong-she (ROC)	R
Toyokazu Nomura (JPN)	0:57
Jang In-gwon (KOR)	E
Patrick Vial (FRA)	5:19
Antoni Zajkowski (POL)	1:12
Gustavo Brito (PUR)	E

Quarterfinal
Antal Hetényi (HUN)	R
Toyokazu Nomura (JPN)	3:12
Patrick Vial (FRA)	E
Antoni Zajkowski (POL)	6:00

Semifinal
Toyokazu Nomura (JPN)	3:40
Antoni Zajkowski (POL)	R
