= Wim Ruska =

Dutch judoka and professional wrestler

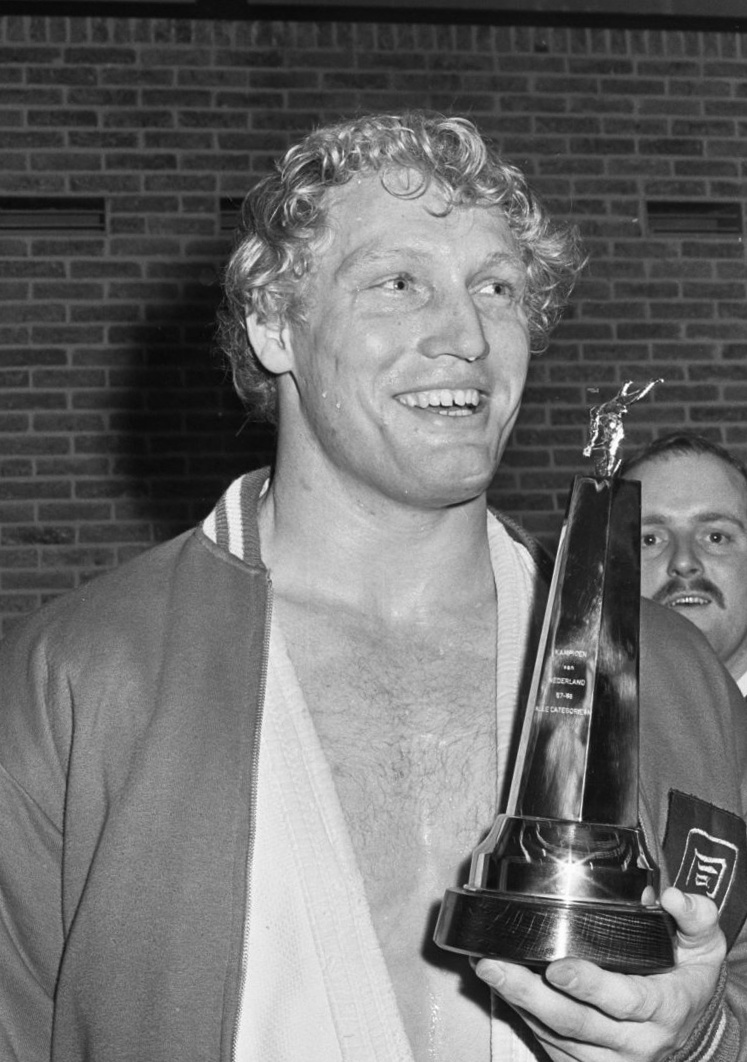
- Wim Ruska in 1968

Personal information
- Full name: Willem Ruska
- Nickname: Tarzan of the Tatami
- Born: 29 August 1940 Amsterdam, the Netherlands
- Died: 14 February 2015 (aged 74)
- Occupation: Judoka
- Height: 1.89 m (6 ft 2 in)
- Weight: 110 kg (243 lb)
- Website: www.willemruska.nl

Sport
- Country: Netherlands
- Sport: Judo
- Weight class: +93 kg, Open
- Rank: 8th dan black belt
Medal record
Men's judo
Representing the Netherlands
Event	1st	2nd	3rd
Olympic Games	2	0	0
World Championships	2	1	0
European Championships	7	3	2
Total	11	4	2
Olympic Games
Gold medal – first place	1972 Munich	+93 kg
Gold medal – first place	1972 Munich	Open
World Championships
Gold medal – first place	1967 Salt Lake City	+93 kg
Gold medal – first place	1971 Ludwigshafen	+93 kg
Silver medal – second place	1969 Mexico City	Open
European Championships
Gold medal – first place	1966 Luxembourg	+93 kg
Gold medal – first place	1967 Rome	+93 kg
Gold medal – first place	1969 Oostende	+93 kg
Gold medal – first place	1969 Oostende	Open
Gold medal – first place	1971 Göteborg	+93 kg
Gold medal – first place	1972 Voorburg	+93 kg
Gold medal – first place	1972 Voorburg	Open
Silver medal – second place	1965 Madrid	Open
Silver medal – second place	1970 Berlin	+93 kg
Silver medal – second place	1970 Berlin	Open
Bronze medal – third place	1965 Madrid	+93 kg
Bronze medal – third place	1967 Rome	Open

Profile at external databases
- IJF: 54566
- JudoInside.com: 4463
- Updated on 24 June 2023

Willem "Wim" Ruska (29 August 1940 – 14 February 2015) was a Dutch judoka and professional wrestler. He is the first athlete to win two gold medals in Judo in one Olympics – in the heavyweight and absolute categories in 1972.

He later worked as a professional wrestler in New Japan Pro-Wrestling and World Wrestling Federation, both as a singles wrestler and as a tag team partner of fellow Olympic judoka "Bad News Allen" Allen Coage.

== Early life ==
Ruska was born in Amsterdam on August 24, 1940.

== Judo career ==
He started learning judo at the Dutch Navy, later traveling to Japan for further training. In the 1960s and 1970s, under the training of Jon Bluming, he won seven European titles, five in the +93 kg category (1966–67, 1969, 1971–72) and two in the open category (1969 and 1972). He furthermore won two world titles (1967 and 1971) and two Olympic titles. His success at the 1972 Summer Olympics was overshadowed by the Munich massacre that took place days before.

He retired after the 1972 Olympics and later took part in professional wrestling.

== Professional wrestling career ==
Wim Ruska
Professional wrestling career
- Billed from: Amsterdam, Netherlands
- Trained by: Antonio Inoki
- Debut: June 2, 1976
- Retired: December 1, 1996

Ruska competed between 1976 and 1980 for the New Japan Pro-Wrestling and World Wide Wrestling Federation promotions. He had over 150 pro wrestling matches, in some of which he was the tag team partner of fellow judoka Allen Coage.

=== Match with Ivan Gomes ===
In 1976, during a tour through Brazil, Ruska was slated to fight a special, high-level bout against Ivan Gomes, a famous vale tudo fighter and former NJPW wrestler himself, on August 7 at the Maracanã Stadium. Previous negotiations about the match's results and length were troublesome, and as a result, there was tension between the parts.

During the bout, refereed by Mr. Takahashi, Gomes attacked Ruska, attacking him with real strikes and illegal closed-fisted punches, which Ruska answered by landing a similar right punch, and the match became a shoot right after. The slightly heavier Brazilian dragged Ruska to the ground with a guillotine choke, but Ruska escaped and mounted him. After becoming entangled with the ring ropes, a bloody Gomes captured Ruska's back and tried a rear naked choke, to which Ruska grabbed the ropes to break action as per the match's rules. However, the Brazilian refused to release Ruska, so the referee, upon observing most of Gomes' body was outside the ropes, called for countout on him in order to end the match at 9:03. There was controversy about whether the choke and the rope escape were effective or not.

The event's crowds believed Gomes had been wronged with the decision, and a riot almost broke out until NJPW president Antonio Inoki came out and calmed them down. Still, repercussion in Brazil was negative, with pundits arguing about who should be considered the victor, even although some acknowledged Gomes had started the affair with an illegal move. As a consequence, the Athletic Commission of Rio de Janeiro banned Takahashi and Ruska from all sport competitions. The Japanese considered Ruska the winner, as Gomes had to receive nine stitches around the right eye for damage suffered in the brawl, while Ruska was comparatively in much better condition. It was also reported Inoki secretly gifted Ruska a money bonus to compensate his ban from competing.

A 90 seconds excerpt of the brawl was shown in 1995 in NJPW's TV show, World Pro Wrestling. During the show, Inoki compared the match to a mixed martial arts fight from Ultimate Fighting Championship.

=== Late career ===
Ruska was a close friend to sambo world champion Chris Dolman, also a Bluming understudy. They had a falling out after Dolman joined Akira Maeda's Fighting Network Rings while Ruska was part of Antonio Inoki's New Japan Pro-Wrestling, but they mended it in September 1997, when Inoki visited Holland along with Naoya Ogawa. They stayed in contact until Ruska's death in 2015.

== Later life ==
In 2001 Ruska suffered a major stroke which left him physically disabled.

In 2013 he was inducted in the Hall of Fame of the International Judo Federation.

Ruska was admitted to a nursing home in 2014. Ruska died on 14 February 2015 at the age of 74 and was survived by his wife, two children and five grandchildren.

== Gallery ==
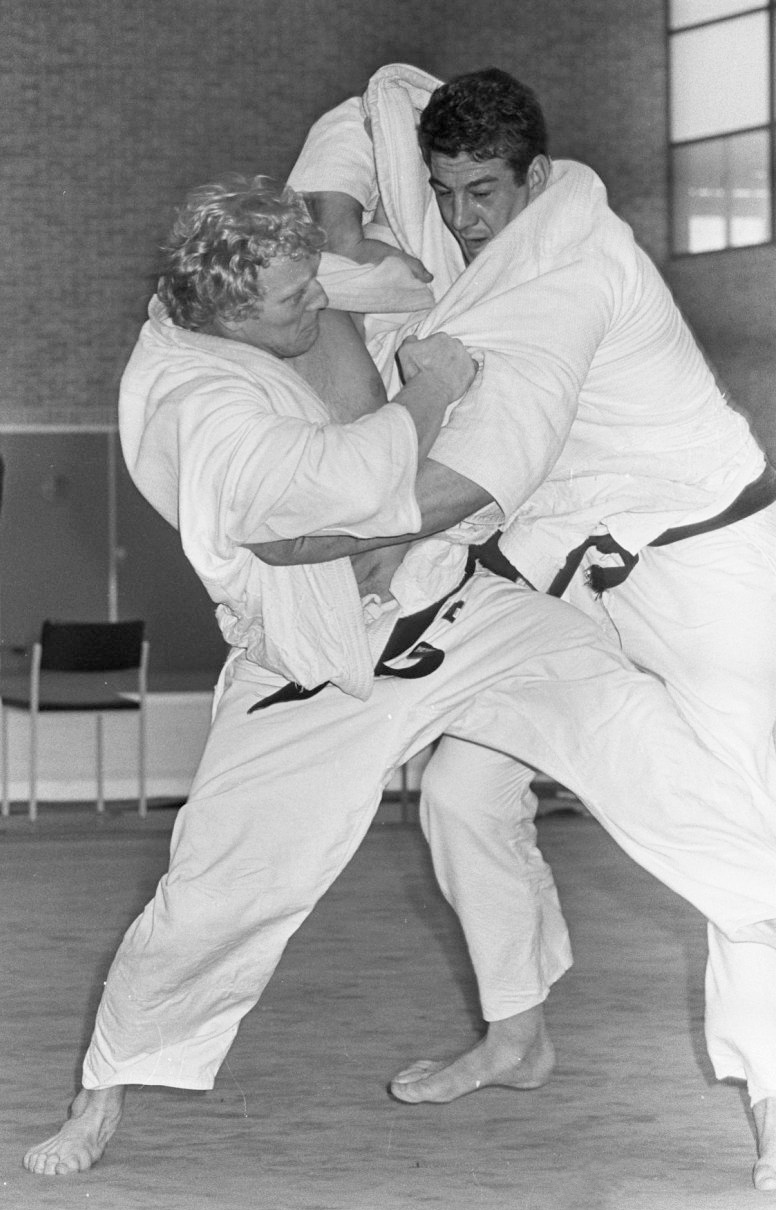
Ruska in 1968

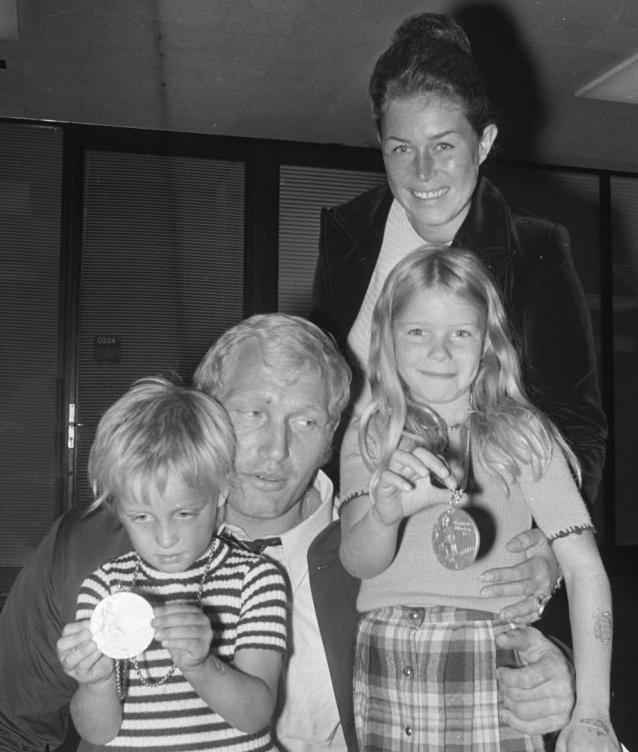
Ruska with family in 1972
