= Babacar Sidibé =

Senegalese judoka

Personal information
- Nationality: Senegalese
- Born: 25 May 1936 (age 88)

Sport
- Sport: Judo

Babacar Sidibé (born 25 May 1936) is a Senegalese judoka. He competed in the men's half-middleweight event at the 1972 Summer Olympics.
