= Robin Moffitt =

Australian judoka

Personal information
- Full name: Robin Ian Moffitt
- Nationality: Australian
- Born: 15 March 1946 (age 79)
- Height: 170 cm (5 ft 7 in)
- Weight: 63 kg (139 lb)

Sport
- Sport: Judo

Robin Ian Moffitt (born 15 March 1946) is an Australian judoka. He competed in the men's lightweight event at the 1972 Summer Olympics.
