= Auffret =

Auffret is a surname. Notable people with the surname include:

- Anne Auffret, French singer and harpist
- Benjamin Auffret (born 1995), French diver
- Charles Auffret (1929–2001), French sculptor
- Frank Auffret (born 1950), British motorcycle speedway rider
- Mélanie Auffret, French film director and screenwriter
- Séverine Auffret, French writer

== See also ==
- Auffray
- Aufray
