= John Watts (judoka) =

American judoka (born 1944)

Personal information
- Full name: Johnny Marion Watts, Sr.
- Born: Johnny Marion Watts; 23 April 1944 (age 82) Jefferson, Texas, United States
- Died: San Bernardino, Ca
- Height: 6 ft 4 in (1.93 m)
- Weight: 300 lb (140 kg)

Sport
- Sport: Judo
- Club: US Air Force
- Coached by: Ben Nighthorse Campbell

Achievements and titles
- Olympic finals: 1972 Olympics, München, Germany 11T

John Watts (born April 23, 1944) is a retired American judoka who competed at the 1972 Olympics in the open weight category. Watts weighed 280 lbs when he started training in judo in August 1966 and that year entered the Air Force Championships where he defeated Paul Maruyama. Watts was quickly promoted to brown belt, and placed in the 1967 US Nationals. He also competed in the International Military Sports Council games.

John Watts was born in Texas and played football there. He was offered a scholarship to play football by Grambling and Florida A&M but chose to join the Air Force.
