= Damirangiin Baatarjav =

Mongolian judoka (born 1943)

Personal information
- Nationality: Mongolian
- Born: 25 August 1943 (age 81)

Sport
- Sport: Judo

Damirangiin Baatarjav (born 25 August 1943) is a Mongolian judoka. He competed in the men's half-middleweight event at the 1972 Summer Olympics.
