= Gustavo Brito =

Puerto Rican judoka

Personal information
- Nationality: Puerto Rican
- Born: 22 May 1954 (age 70)

Sport
- Sport: Judo

Gustavo Brito (born 22 May 1954) is a Puerto Rican judoka. He competed in the men's half-middleweight event at the 1972 Summer Olympics.
