= Antoni Zajkowski =

Polish judoka

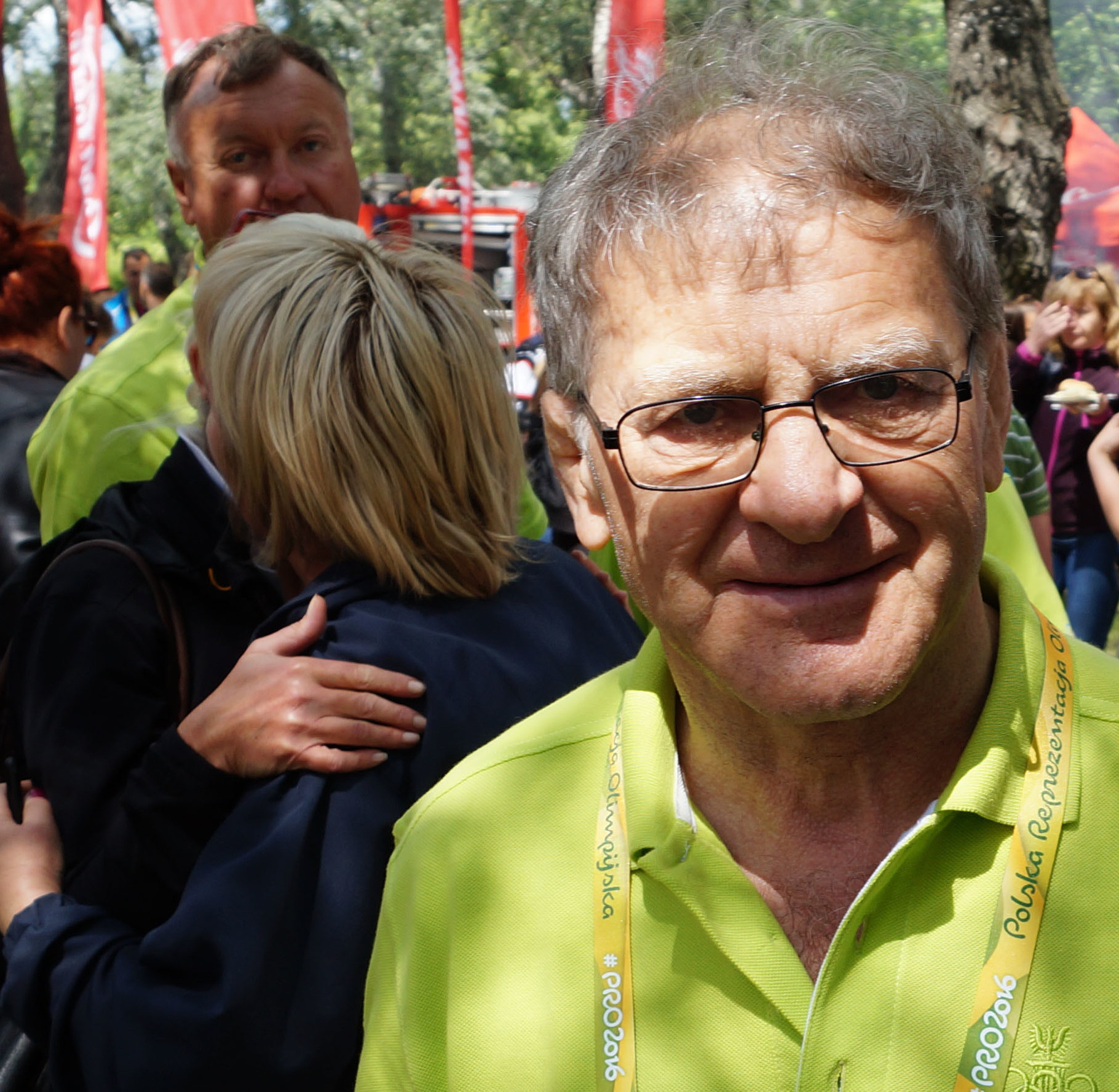
- Zajkowski in 2016

Personal information
- Born: 5 August 1948 (age 77)
- Occupation: Judoka
- Height: 170 cm (5 ft 7 in)
- Weight: 73 kg (161 lb)

Sport
- Country: Poland
- Sport: Judo
- Weight class: ‍–‍70 kg

Achievements and titles
- Olympic Games: (silver) (1972)
- World Champ.: (bronze) (1971)
- European Champ.: (silver) (1969, 1971)
Medal record
Men's judo
Representing Poland
Olympic Games
Silver medal – second place	1972 Munich	‍–‍70 kg
World Championships
Bronze medal – third place	1971 Ludwigshafen	‍–‍70 kg
European Championships
Silver medal – second place	1969 Oostende	‍–‍70 kg
Silver medal – second place	1971 Göteborg	‍–‍70 kg

Profile at external databases
- IJF: 54493
- JudoInside.com: 1185
- Updated on 22 June 2023

Antoni Zajkowski (born 5 August 1948) is a Polish former judoka who competed in the 1972 Summer Olympics.
