= Kenneth Okada =

American judoka

Personal information
- Born: February 22, 1950 (age 76) Los Angeles, California, United States
- Occupation: Judoka

Sport
- Sport: Judo

Profile at external databases
- JudoInside.com: 8723

Kenneth Okada (born February 22, 1950) is an American judoka. He competed in the men's lightweight event at the 1972 Summer Olympics.
