= Roberto Pacheco =

Puerto Rican judoka

Personal information
- Nationality: Puerto Rican
- Born: 21 February 1952 (age 73)
- Occupation: Judoka

Sport
- Sport: Judo

Roberto Pacheco (born 21 February 1952) is a Puerto Rican judoka. He competed in the men's lightweight event at the 1972 Summer Olympics.
