= Vitali Kuznetsov (judoka) =

Russian judoka (1941–2011)

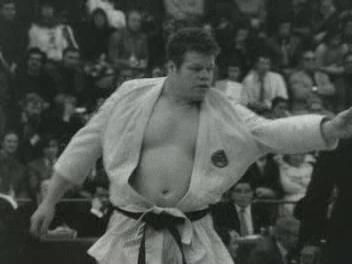
- Vitali Kutznetsov in 1972

Personal information
- Full name: Vitali Yakovlevich Kuznetsov
- Born: 16 February 1941
- Died: 12 October 2011 (aged 70)
- Occupation: Judoka

Sport
- Country: Soviet Union
- Sport: Judo
- Weight class: +93 kg, +95 kg, Open

Achievements and titles
- Olympic Games: (silver) (1972)
- World Champ.: (silver) (1971, 1979)
- European Champ.: (gold) (1971)
Medal record
Representing Soviet Union
Men's judo
Olympic Games
| Silver medal – second place | 1972 Munich | Open |
World Championships
| Silver medal – second place | 1971 Ludwigshafen | Open |
| Silver medal – second place | 1979 Paris | Open |
European Championships
| Gold medal – first place | 1971 Göteborg | Open |
| Silver medal – second place | 1979 Brussels | +95 kg |
| Bronze medal – third place | 1969 Oostende | +93 kg |
| Bronze medal – third place | 1972 Voorburg | +93 kg |
Men's sambo
World Championships
| Gold medal – first place | 1975 Minsk | +100 kg |
| Gold medal – first place | 1982 Paris | +100 kg |
European Championships
| Gold medal – first place | 1972 Riga | +100 kg |

Profile at external databases
- IJF: 54311
- JudoInside.com: 5840
- Updated on 24 June 2023

Vitali Yakovlevich Kuznetsov (Russian: Виталий Яковлевич Кузнецов, 16 February 1941 – 13 October 2011) was a Russian judoka and sambo practitioner who competed for the Soviet Union at the 1972 Summer Olympics and the 1980 Summer Olympics. In 1972 he won the silver medal in the open category.
