= Giuseppe Tommasi =

Italian judoka

Personal information
- Nationality: Italian
- Born: 3 June 1946 (age 78); Torchiarolo, Italy

Sport
- Sport: Judo

Giuseppe Tommasi (born 3 June 1946) is an Italian judoka. He competed in the men's lightweight event at the 1972 Summer Olympics.
