= Pierre Smets =

Belgian judoka

Personal information
- Nationality: Belgian
- Born: 19 March 1950 (age 75)

Sport
- Sport: Judo

Pierre Smets (born 19 March 1950) is a Belgian judoka. He competed in the men's open category event at the 1972 Summer Olympics.
