= Luciano Di Palma =

Italian judoka

Personal information
- Nationality: Italian
- Born: 25 May 1944; Rome, Italy
- Died: March 2016 (aged 71)

Sport
- Sport: Judo

Luciano Di Palma (25 May 1944 – March 2016) was an Italian judoka. He competed in the men's half-middleweight event at the 1972 Summer Olympics.
