= Masatoshi Shinomaki =

Japanese judoka (born 1946)

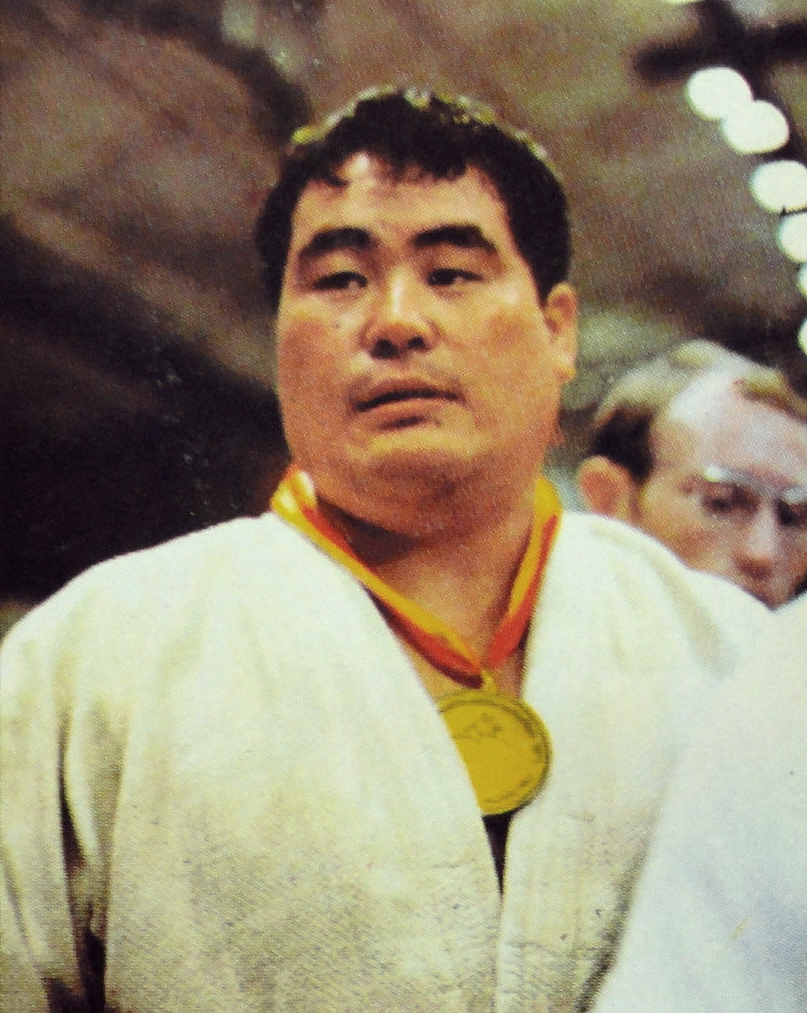
- Masatoshi Shinomaki c. 1972

Personal information
- Born: October 6, 1946 (age 79) Chiba Prefecture, Japan
- Occupation: Judoka
- Height: 181 cm (5 ft 11 in)
- Weight: 115 kg (254 lb)

Sport
- Sport: Judo
Medal record
Representing Japan
World Championships
Gold medal – first place	1969 Mexico City	Open
Gold medal – first place	1971 Ludwigshafen	Open
Bronze medal – third place	1967 Salt Lake City	Open
Summer Universiade
Gold medal – first place	1967 Tokyo	Open

Profile at external databases
- JudoInside.com: 5479

Masatoshi Shinomaki (篠巻 政利, born October 6, 1946) is a retired Japanese heavyweight judoka, who won the world title in the open category in 1969 and 1971, placing third in 1967. He also competed at the 1972 Summer Olympics.
