= Givi Onashvili =

Georgian judoka (born 1947)

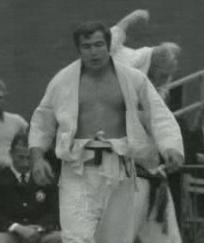
- Givi Onashvili in 1972

Personal information
- Full name: Givi Ivanovich Onashvili
- Born: 27 July 1947 (age 78)
- Occupation: Judoka

Sport
- Country: Soviet Union
- Sport: Judo
- Weight class: +93 kg, Open

Achievements and titles
- Olympic Games: (bronze) (1972)
- World Champ.: (bronze) (1969)
- European Champ.: (gold) (1974, 1975)
Medal record
Men's judo
Representing Soviet Union
Olympic Games
Bronze medal – third place	1972 Munich	+93 kg
World Championships
Bronze medal – third place	1969 Mexico City	+93 kg
European Championships
Gold medal – first place	1974 London	+93 kg
Gold medal – first place	1975 Lyon	Open
Silver medal – second place	1969 Oostende	+93 kg
Silver medal – second place	1972 Voorburg	+93 kg
Silver medal – second place	1976 Kyiv	+93 kg
Bronze medal – third place	1971 Göteborg	+93 kg

Profile at external databases
- IJF: 2930
- JudoInside.com: 5870
- Updated on 24 June 2023

Givi Ivanovich Onashvili (Georgian: გივი ონაშვილი; born 27 July 1947) is a Georgian judoka who competed for the Soviet Union at the 1972 Summer Olympics, and won a bronze medal in the heavyweight class.

Onashvili won a bronze medal in the 1969 World Judo Championships in Mexico City. He is a double European Champion (London 1974 and Lyon 1975), three times silver medalist (Oostende 1969, Voorburg 1972 and Kiev 1976) and bronze medalist in Göteborg 1971. In 1976, he won a silver medal in the International Tournament of Paris.
