= Stanko Topolčnik =

Slovenian judoka (1947–2013)

Personal information
- Nationality: Slovenian
- Born: 2 December 1947 Slovenska Bistrica, Yugoslavia
- Died: 14 April 2013 (aged 65)

Sport
- Sport: Judo

Stanko Topolčnik (2 December 1947 – 14 April 2013) was a Slovenian judoka. He competed in the men's lightweight event at the 1972 Summer Olympics, representing Yugoslavia.
