= Jean-Claude Brondani =

French judoka (born 1944)

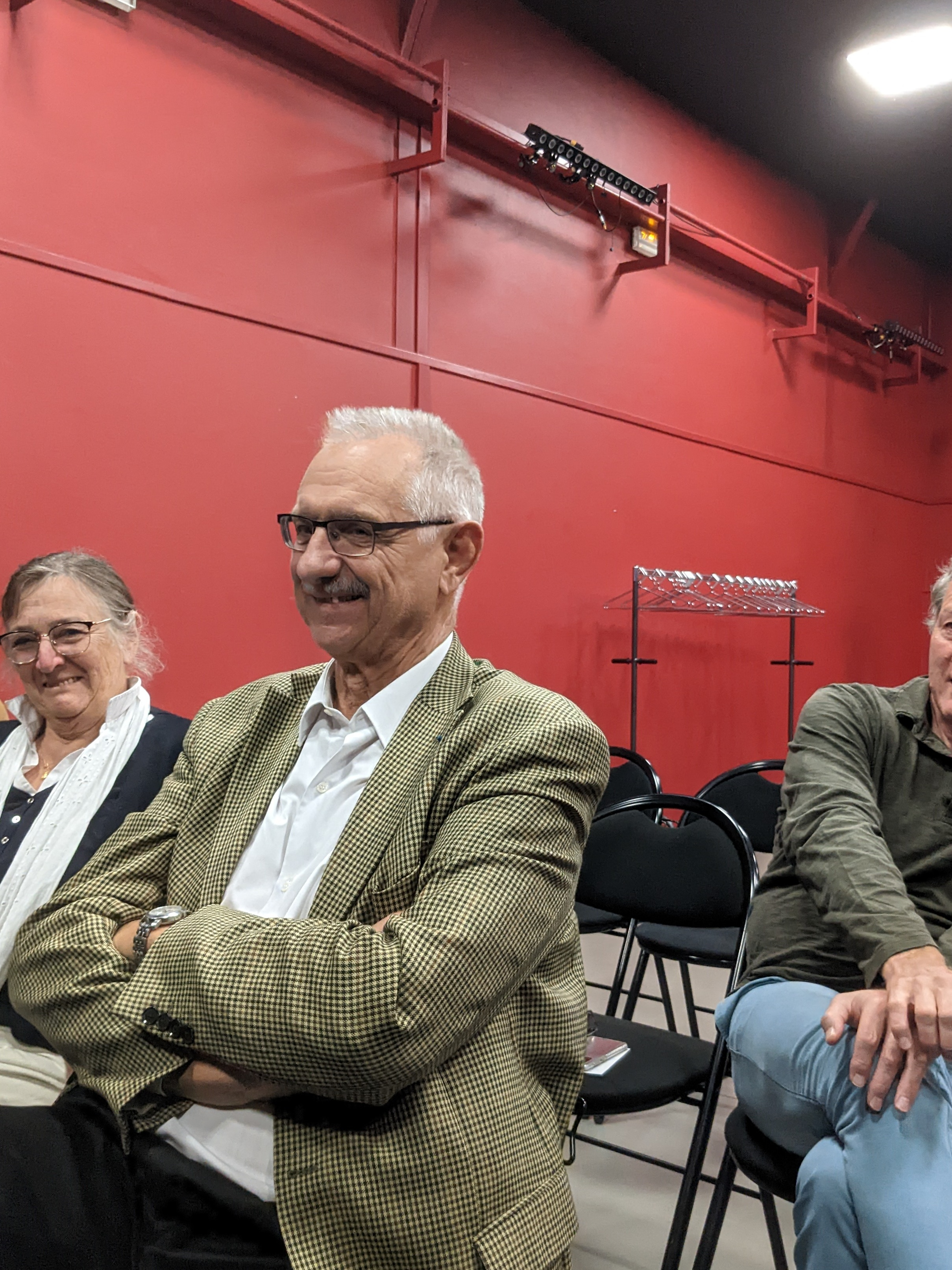

Personal information
- Born: 2 February 1944 (age 82)
- Occupation: Judoka

Sport
- Country: France
- Sport: Judo
- Weight class: +93 kg, Open

Achievements and titles
- Olympic Games: (bronze) (1972)
- World Champ.: QF (1969)
- European Champ.: (silver) (1972)
Medal record
Men's judo
Representing France
Olympic Games
Bronze medal – third place	1972 Munich	Open
European Championships
Silver medal – second place	1972 Voorburg	Open
Bronze medal – third place	1964 Berlin	ama +80 kg
Bronze medal – third place	1970 Berlin	Open
Summer Universiade
Bronze medal – third place	1967 Tokyo	+93 kg

Profile at external databases
- IJF: 54553
- JudoInside.com: 5063
- Updated on 24 June 2023

Jean-Claude Brondani (born 2 February 1944) is a French former judoka who competed in the 1972 Summer Olympics.
