= Antonio Gallina =

Argentine judoka

Personal information
- Full name: Antonio R. Gallina
- Nationality: Argentine
- Born: 30 November 1947 (age 77)
- Height: 177 cm (5 ft 10 in)
- Weight: 80 kg (176 lb)

Sport
- Sport: Judo

Antonio R. Gallina (born 30 November 1947) is an Argentine judoka. He competed in the men's middleweight event at the 1972 Summer Olympics.
