= Maurice Foulon =

French politician (1886–1968)

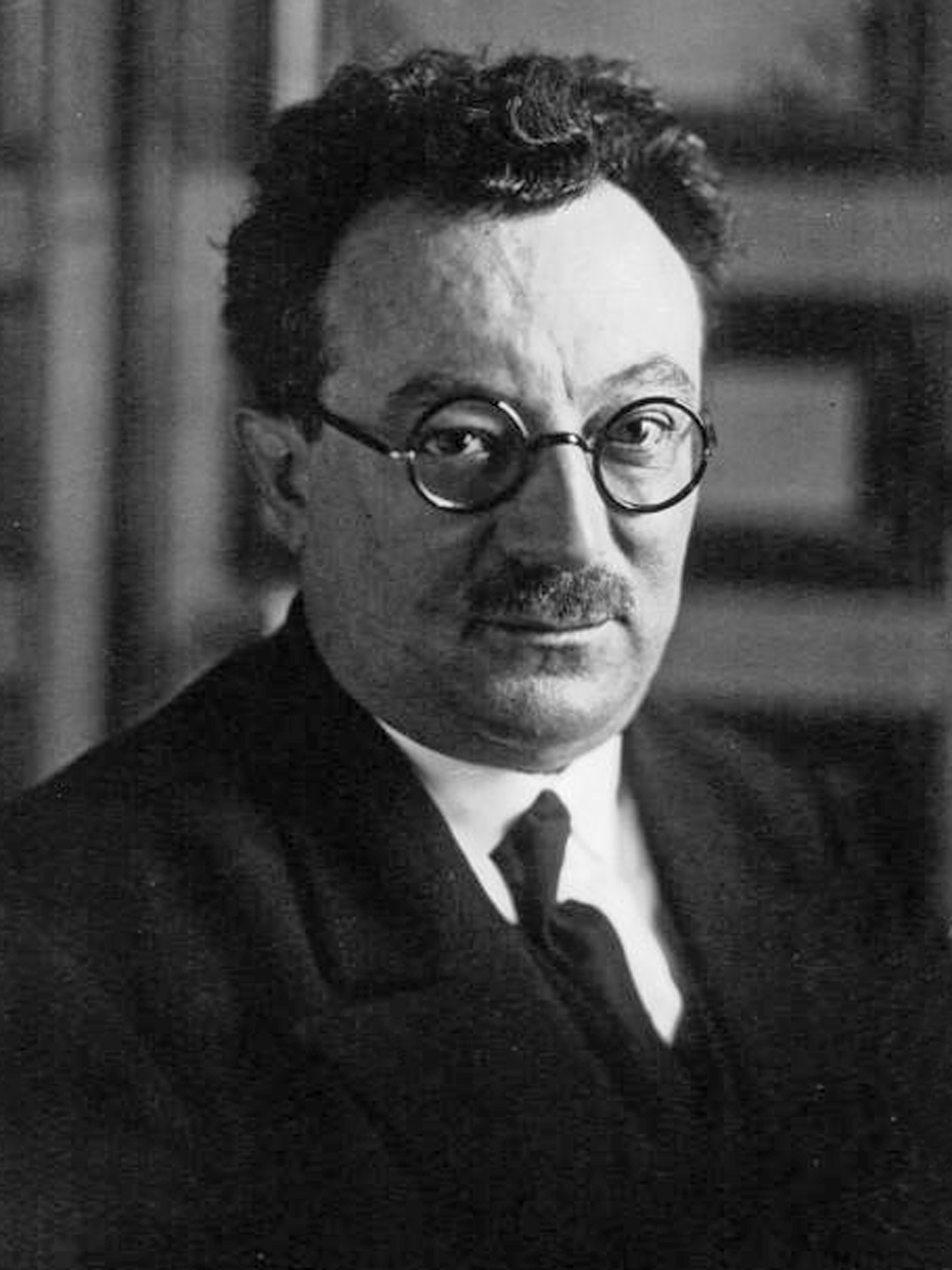
- Maurice Foulon in 1932
- Born: 16 September 1886; Pantin, Seine-Saint-Denis, France
- Died: 22 February 1968 (aged 81); Paris, France
- Occupation: Politician

Maurice Foulon (1886–1968) was a French politician. He served as a member of the Chamber of Deputies from 1928 to 1936, representing Seine.
