= Brian Jacks =

British judoka (born 1946)

Brian Jacks BJA 8th Dan, WMAC 10th Dan
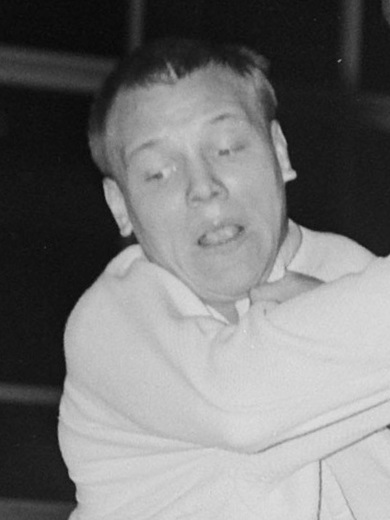
- Brian Jacks in 1967

Personal information
- Born: Brian Albert Thomas Jacks; 5 October 1946 (age 79) London, England
- Home town: Pattaya, Thailand
- Occupation: Judoka
- Height: 1.78 m (5 ft 10 in)

Sport
- Country: Great Britain
- Sport: Judo
- Weight class: ‍–‍70 kg, ‍–‍80 kg
- Rank: 8th dan black belt
- Club: Budokwai

Achievements and titles
- Olympic Games: (bronze) (1972)
- World Champ.: (bronze) (1967)
- European Champ.: (gold) (1970, 1973)
Medal record
Men's judo
Representing Great Britain
Olympic Games
Bronze medal – third place	1972 Munich	‍–‍80 kg
World Championships
Bronze medal – third place	1967 Salt Lake City	‍–‍80 kg
European Championships
Gold medal – first place	1970 Berlin	‍–‍80 kg
Gold medal – first place	1973 Madrid	‍–‍80 kg
Silver medal – second place	1965 Madrid	‍–‍70 kg
Bronze medal – third place	1964 Berlin	‍–‍68 kg
Bronze medal – third place	1967 Rome	‍–‍80 kg
Bronze medal – third place	1971 Göteborg	‍–‍80 kg
European Junior Championships
Gold medal – first place	1964 Berlin	‍–‍80 kg
Gold medal – first place	1965 Scheveningen	‍–‍80 kg
Bronze medal – third place	1967 Lisbon	‍–‍80 kg

Profile at external databases
- IJF: 54378
- JudoInside.com: 4951
- Updated on 22 June 2023

Brian Jacks (born 5 October 1946) is a British judoka who won Britain's first medal at a World Championships taking a bronze in Salt Lake City 1967, and gained a second bronze at the 1972 Munich Olympics.

== Superstars ==
Brian Jacks later achieved national fame, due to his enormous upper body strength, for his performances on the BBC programme Superstars, all-around sports competition that pits elite athletes from different sports against one another in a series of athletic events resembling a decathlon. He was one of the most successful competitors and dominated the British and European version of the contest from 1979 to 1980, winning four titles.

Jacks was most famous for his efforts in the gymnasium, where he repeatedly set records in the "gym tests", including 100 parallel bar dips in 60 seconds in the 1981 Challenge of the Champions, and 118 squat thrusts in the 1980 World Final. He was also very dominant in the weightlifting, canoeing and cycling events, rarely placing lower than second. Jacks was never able to win the World Superstars title, being forced to miss the 1979 event due to illness and finishing third in 1980. In 1981 he was beaten for the first time in Europe (by Keith Fielding) and would never again compete in Superstars.

His victories in the British and European Superstars led to the creation of the branded computer games: Brian Jacks Superstar Challenge and Uchi Mata.

=== Superstars record ===
Year	Event	Position
1979	British Heat 2	1st
1979	British Final	1st
1979	European Final	1st
1980	British Final	1st
1980	International	1st
1980	World Final	3rd
1981	Challenge of the Champions	3rd

== Retirement ==
After retiring from judo he opened a fitness and martial arts club, and in 1990 he started a company hiring bouncy castles. In 1984 he briefly appeared on the BBC show Micro Live, where he set up his new Atari 800XL with his family.

Jacks lives in Pattaya, Thailand and runs a 60-room hotel/condo building.

Jacks has held the official judo rank of 8th Dan from the British Judo Association (BJA) since November 1994.

== Autobiography ==
- Brian Jacks: The Mindset of a Champion, Brian Jacks, 2017 - ISBN 978-9811140792
