= Han Seong-cheol =

South Korean judoka

Personal information
- Nationality: South Korean
- Born: 18 April 1948 (age 76)

Sport
- Sport: Judo

Han Seong-cheol (born 18 April 1948) is a South Korean judoka. He competed in the men's lightweight event at the 1972 Summer Olympics.
