= Raúl Foullon =

Mexican judoka

Personal information
- Nationality: Mexican
- Born: 25 February 1955 (age 70)

Sport
- Sport: Judo

Raúl Foullon (born 25 February 1955) is a Mexican judoka. He competed in the men's half-middleweight event at the 1972 Summer Olympics.
