= Toyokazu Nomura =

Japanese judoka (born 1949)

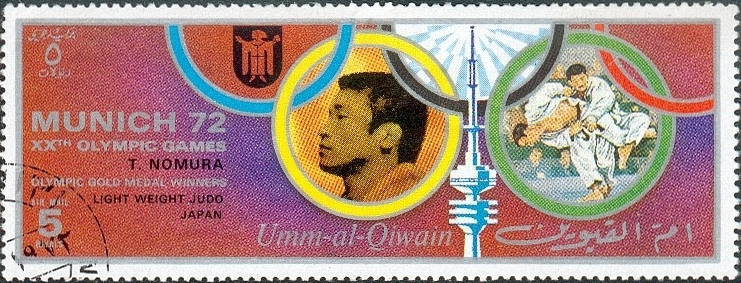
- Nomura on a stamp of Umm al-Quwain

Personal information
- Born: 14 July 1949 (age 76) Kōryō, Nara, Japan
- Occupation: Judoka
- Height: 163 cm (5 ft 4 in)

Sport
- Country: Japan
- Sport: Judo
- Weight class: ‍–‍63 kg, ‍–‍70 kg

Achievements and titles
- Olympic Games: (gold) (1972)
- World Champ.: (1973)
- Asian Champ.: (gold) (1972)
Medal record
Men's judo
Representing Japan
Olympic Games
Gold medal – first place	1972 Munich	‍–‍70 kg
World Championships
Gold medal – first place	1973 Lausanne	‍–‍70 kg
Silver medal – second place	1969 Mexico City	‍–‍63 kg
Silver medal – second place	1971 Ludwigshafen	‍–‍63 kg
Asian Championships
Gold medal – first place	1972 Kaohsiung	‍–‍70 kg

Profile at external databases
- IJF: 54489
- JudoInside.com: 5451
- Updated on 22 June 2023

Toyokazu Nomura (野村 豊和, Nomura Toyokazu; born 14 July 1949) is a retired judoka who competed in the half-middleweight (‍–‍70 kg) division.

== Life and career ==
Nomura was born into a family of judoka. His father was the founder of a local judo dojo, and his brother was also an instructor who taught Olympic gold medalist Shinji Hosokawa. His nephew, Tadahiro Nomura, is the only judoka to have won three gold medals at the Summer Olympics. Nomura himself attended Tenri University before starting work at the Hakuhodo company. He placed second in the World Judo Championships in 1969 and 1971, and won the All-Japan Judo Championships in 1972 to become the Japanese representative for the half middleweight division at the 1972 Summer Olympics. He won all five of his matches at the Olympics by ippon to capture the gold medal. He also won the 1973 World Judo Championships held in Lausanne, Switzerland.

Nomura has worked as a schoolteacher in Wakayama Prefecture since retiring from competitive judo.

== See also ==
- List of judoka
- List of Olympic medalists in judo
