= Angelo Parisi =

French judoka (born 1953)

Personal information
- Born: 3 January 1953 (age 73)
- Occupation: Judoka

Sport
- Country: Great Britain (until 1974); France (since 1975)
- Sport: Judo
- Weight class: +95 kg, Open
- Rank: 8th dan black belt

Achievements and titles
- Olympic Games: (gold) (1980)
- World Champ.: 7th (1983)
- European Champ.: (gold) (1972, 1977, 1983, 1984)
Medal record
Men's judo
Representing France
Olympic Games
Gold medal – first place	1980 Moscow	+95 kg
Silver medal – second place	1980 Moscow	Open
Silver medal – second place	1984 Los Angeles	+95 kg
European Championships
Gold medal – first place	1977 Ludwigshafen	Open
Gold medal – first place	1983 Paris	Open
Gold medal – first place	1984 Liege	Open
Silver medal – second place	1978 Helsinki	‍–‍95 kg
Silver medal – second place	1979 Brussels	Open
Silver medal – second place	1980 Vienna	Open
Silver medal – second place	1982 Rostock	+95 kg
Bronze medal – third place	1980 Vienna	+95 kg
Bronze medal – third place	1983 Paris	+95 kg
Representing Great Britain
Olympic Games
Bronze medal – third place	1972 Munich	Open
European Championships
Gold medal – first place	1972 Voorburg	‍–‍93 kg
European Junior Championships
Gold medal – first place	1971 Naples	‍–‍93 kg
Gold medal – first place	1973 Oostende	+93 kg
European Cadet Championships
Gold medal – first place	1970 Bordeaux	+85 kg

Profile at external databases
- IJF: 54175
- JudoInside.com: 4979
- Updated on 19 June 2023

Angelo Parisi (born 3 January 1953 in Arpino, Frosinone, Italy) is a French judoka and olympic champion. He won a gold medal in the heavyweight division at the 1980 Summer Olympics in Moscow. At his Olympic debut in 1972 he represented Great Britain. Parisi holds the 8th dan degree.
