= Gerold Jungwirth =

Austrian judoka

Personal information
- Nationality: Austrian
- Born: 20 July 1947 (age 78)
- Occupation: Judoka

Sport
- Sport: Judo
- Retired: June 1987

Gerold Jungwirth (born 20 July 1947) is an Austrian judoka. He competed in the men's half-middleweight event at the 1972 Summer Olympics.
