= Judo at the 1972 Summer Olympics – Men's 63 kg =

Judo competition

Men's 63kg at the Games of the XX Olympiad
- Venue: Judo and Wrestling Hall
- Date: 4 September 1972
- Competitors: 29 from 29 nations

Medalists
1st place, gold medalist(s)		Takao Kawaguchi	Japan
2nd place, silver medalist(s)		not awarded	
3rd place, bronze medalist(s)		Kim Yong-Ik	North Korea
3rd place, bronze medalist(s)		Jean-Jacques Mounier	France

The men's 63 kg competition in judo at the 1972 Summer Olympics in Munich, West Germany was held at Judo and Wrestling Hall. In the gold medal match Bakhvain Buyadda of Mongolia, an unknown and very inexperienced judoka, lost to Takao Kawaguchi. Several days later, Buyadda became the first Olympic judoka with a positive result for doping. His medal was removed, but the other athletes were not moved and second place is considered vacant.

== Results ==
=== Finals ===
Semi-finals
Takao Kawaguchi (JPN)	5:58
Kim Yong-Ik (PRK)	3rd place, bronze medalist(s)
~~Bakhvain Buyadaa (MGL)~~	~~8:00~~
Jean-Jacques Mounier (FRA)	3rd place, bronze medalist(s)

Final
Takao Kawaguchi (JPN)	0:39 (gold)
~~Bakhvain Buyadaa (MGL)~~	DQ

=== Repechages ===
Repechage		Repechage semifinal		Repechage final
Cheng Chi-Hsiang (ROC)	6:00
Han Seong-Cheol (KOR)	EL	~~Bakhvain Buyadaa (MGL)~~	3:58
		Cheng Chi-Hsiang (ROC)	EL
				Wolfram Koppen (FRG)	EL
				~~Bakhvain Buyadaa (MGL)~~	2:57

Repechage		Repechage semifinal		Repechage final
Kim Yong-Ik (PRK)	6:00
Edward Mullen (GBR)	EL	Kim Yong-Ik (PRK)	5:51
		Ferenc Szabó (HUN)	EL
				Héctor Rodríguez (CUB)	EL
				Kim Yong-Ik (PRK)	2:14

=== Pool A ===
Round of 32
Gustaaf Lauwereins (BEL)	5:23
Juan Chalas (DOM)	EL
Moustafa Belhmira (MAR)	EL
Karl-Heinz Werner (GDR)	6:00
Wolfram Koppen (FRG)	6:00
Giuseppe Tommasi (ITA)	EL
Xavier Boissy (SEN)	EL
Roberto Pacheco (PUR)	6:00
Kenneth Okada (USA)	EL
~~Bakhvain Buyadaa (MGL)~~	4:40
Marcel Burkhard (SUI)	5:16
Iwan Blijd (SUR)	EL
Cheng Chi-hsiang (ROC)	RE
Takao Kawaguchi (JPN)	2:40
Han Seong-cheol (KOR)
BYE

Round of 16
Gustaaf Lauwereins (BEL)	EL
Karl-Heinz Werner (GDR)	4:21
Wolfram Koppen (FRG)	2:15
Roberto Pacheco (PUR)	EL
~~Bakhvain Buyadaa (MGL)~~	6:00
Marcel Burkhard (SUI)	EL
Takao Kawaguchi (JPN)	3:28
Han Seong-Cheol (KOR)	RE

Quarterfinal
Karl-Heinz Werner (GDR)	EL
Wolfram Koppen (FRG)	6:00
~~Bakhvain Buyadaa (MGL)~~	RE
Takao Kawaguchi (JPN)	6:00

Semifinal
Wolfram Koppen (FRG)	RE
Takao Kawaguchi (JPN)	4:44

=== Pool B ===
Round of 32
Stanko Topolčik (YUG)	3:16
Erich Pointer (AUT)	EL
Marian Tałaj (POL)	2:13
Robin Moffitt (AUS)	EL
Louis Rabetrano (MAD)	EL
Renato Repuyan (PHI)	6:00
Héctor Rodríguez (CUB)
BYE
Kim Yong-Ik (PRK)	RE
Jean-Jacques Mounier (FRA)	6:00
Alan Sakai (CAN)	EL
Edward Mullen (GBR)	6:00
Ferenc Szabó (HUN)	6:00
Anto Clarke (IRL)	EL
Sergey Suslin (URS)
BYE

Round of 16
Stanko Topolčnik (YUG)	EL
Marian Tałaj (POL)	6:00
Renato Repuyan (PHI)	EL
Héctor Rodríguez (CUB)	0:28
Jean-Jacques Mounier (FRA)	6:00
Edward Mullen (GBR)	RE
Ferenc Szabó (HUN)	6:00
Sergey Suslin (URS)	EL

Quarterfinal
Marian Tałaj (POL)	EL
Héctor Rodríguez (CUB)	6:00
Jean-Jacques Mounier (FRA)	6:00
Ferenc Szabó (HUN)	RE

Semifinal
Héctor Rodríguez (CUB)	RE
Jean-Jacques Mounier (FRA)	6:00
