= Jean-Jacques Mounier =

French Olympic judoka

Personal information
- Born: 12 June 1949 (age 77)
- Occupation: Judoka

Sport
- Country: France
- Sport: Judo
- Weight class: ‍–‍63 kg

Achievements and titles
- Olympic Games: (bronze) (1972)
- World Champ.: 5th (1973)
- European Champ.: (gold) (1970, 1971, 1972)
Medal record
Men's judo
Representing France
Olympic Games
Bronze medal – third place	1972 Munich	‍–‍63 kg
European Championships
Gold medal – first place	1970 Berlin	‍–‍63 kg
Gold medal – first place	1971 Göteborg	‍–‍63 kg
Gold medal – first place	1972 Voorburg	‍–‍63 kg
Bronze medal – third place	1969 Oostende	‍–‍63 kg

Profile at external databases
- IJF: 54470
- JudoInside.com: 5189
- Updated on 22 June 2023

Jean-Jacques Mounier (born 12 June 1949) is a French former judoka who competed in the 1972 Summer Olympics.
