= Chiaki Ishii =

Japanese-born Brazilian judoka (1941–2026)

Personal information
- Born: 1 October 1941 Ashikaga, Japan
- Died: 16 October 2026 (aged 85) Presidente Prudente, São Paulo, Brazil
- Occupation: Judoka

Sport
- Country: Brazil
- Sport: Judo
- Weight class: ‍–‍93 kg, Open

Achievements and titles
- Olympic Games: (bronze) (1972)
- World Champ.: (bronze) (1971)
- Pan American Champ.: (gold) (1970, 1970, 1972, 1972)
Medal record
Men's judo
Representing Brazil
Olympic Games
Bronze medal – third place	1972 Munich	‍–‍93 kg
World Championships
Bronze medal – third place	1971 Ludwigshafen	‍–‍93 kg
Pan American Championships
Gold medal – first place	1970 Londrina	Open
Gold medal – first place	1970 Londrina	‍–‍93 kg
Gold medal – first place	1972 Buenos Aires	Open
Gold medal – first place	1972 Buenos Aires	‍–‍93 kg

Profile at external databases
- IJF: 34756
- JudoInside.com: 698
- Updated on 24 June 2023

Chiaki Ishii (Japanese: チアキ・イシイ; born 石井 千秋, Ishii Chiaki; 1 October 1941 – 16 October 2026) was a Japanese-born Brazilian judoka, who won Brazil's first Olympic medal (of bronze) in judo at the 1972 Summer Olympics in Munich, West Germany.

== Career ==
Ishii trained at judo from a very young age, at a dojo located near his house, and graduated in pedagogy at Waseda University. He was eager to participate in the first judo Olympic tournament at the 1964 Summer Olympics at home soil in Tokyo, but lost his spot to eventual gold medalist Isao Okano. Frustrated, he quit the sport temporarily and decided to emigrate to Brazil, where he would become a farmer. After a sixty-day boat trip, Ishii arrived in Brazil and worked on a farm at a Japanese Brazilian community in Presidente Prudente. After being convinced to fight a local judo tournament for fun, Ishii's skills impressed enough for the inhabitants to ask him to become a judo teacher. Added to Ishii's frustration with the farming life, he started to teach the martial art, eventually opening a dojo in São Paulo. In 1969, Ishii was naturalized Brazilian to participate again in judo competitions.

He won a bronze medal at both the 1972 Summer Olympics in Munich, and the 1971 World Judo Championships.

Two of Ishii's three daughters, Tânia and Vânia Ishii, are also judokas. Vânia was a gold medalist at the Pan-American Games and both Vânia and Tânia represented Brazil in the Olympics.

Ishii is considered the founding father of modern Brazilian Judo and his legacy is directly linked to the prowess of judo being the only sport in which Brazil has collected medals in every Olympic Games since Los Angeles 1984.

== Death ==
Ishii died on 16 October 2026, at the age of 85.
