= Rachel Foullon =

American artist and curator

- Born: 1978 (age 46–47); Glendale, California
- Education: MFA
- Alma mater: New York University; Columbia University
- Occupations: Artist and curator
- Website: rachelfoullon.com

Rachel Foullon (born 1978) is an American artist and curator. Foullon has exhibited her works in galleries and museums nationally and internationally in addition to organizing and curating multiple exhibitions across the United States. She is also the Director of Operations at Monkeypaw Productions.

== Life ==
Foullon was born in 1978 in Glendale, California. She received her Bachelor of Science in Studio Art from New York University in 2000, and her Masters in Fine Arts in Visual Arts from Columbia University in 2004.

== Career ==
In 2001 Foullon’s work was a part of the New York City group exhibition The Worst of Gordon Pym Continued. In 2004 her work was then a part of the group exhibition Four-Ply in New York City. That year she also co-founded the Public Holiday Projects curatorial initiative with Matt Keegan and Laura Kleger, which organized a group exhibition of 25 artists entitled Bunch Alliance and Dissolve in 2006 at the Contemporary Arts Center in Cincinnati. In 2005 her work was also a part of the group exhibition Talk to the Land in New York City. Of her 2006 sculpture Deck, the Editor-in-Chief of BOMB Magazine Betsy Sussler wrote, "Foullon works in the space between the thing itself and what it represents, not only in the world we traffic in but in the symbolic world of the imagination." In 2009 she held her first solo exhibition, Grab a Root and Growl, in New York City, which was followed by her 2010 solo exhibition An Accounting, held in Los Angeles.

Foullon's 2012 exhibition Braided Sun at the University Art Museum, University at Albany included new works as well as work from the previous decade. In 2012 she also showed her series of sculptures entitled Clusters in her solo exhibition Ruminant Recombinant in Los Angeles. In 2014 works from her series Cruel Radiance were shown in the Sotheby's S2 Gallery.

In 2015 Foullon curated the exhibition Six Doors, the first Foundation for Contemporary Arts funded exhibition to be held in the New York Meatpacking District, showcasing the works of six artists. That year she also developed a solo art exhibition entitled Double Gate at 55 Gansevoort in New York. She has also advocated for artists facing displacement due to gentrification in the media. Foullon is currently the Director of Operations at Monkeypaw Productions.

== Style ==
Foullon uses wood, metal and fabric in her multimedia sculptures. Materials used her work have included canvas and other fabrics that Foullon herself has dyed and shaped and found objects, such as old farm tools. Her work has been commissioned by collector Sarah Elson. Foullon has also been cited for her use of recycled materials and usage of paper and space.
