= Engelbert Dörbrandt =

German judoka

Personal information
- Nationality: German
- Born: 2 February 1949 (age 77) Berlin, Germany
- Occupation: Judoka

Sport
- Sport: Judo

Profile at external databases
- IJF: 54475
- JudoInside.com: 4791

Engelbert Dörbrandt (born 2 February 1949) is a German judoka. He competed in the men's half-middleweight event at the 1972 Summer Olympics.
