= Sergey Suslin =

Russian judoka

Personal information
- Nationality: Soviet
- Born: 9 November 1944 Moscow, Soviet Union
- Died: 1989 (aged 44–45) Moscow, Soviet Union

Sport
- Sport: Judo, Sambo
Medal record
Representing the Soviet Union
Men's Judo
World Championships
Bronze medal – third place	1967 Salt Lake City	63 kg
Bronze medal – third place	1969 Mexico City	63 kg
Bronze medal – third place	1971 Ludwigshafen	63 kg
European Championships
Silver medal – second place	1965 Madrid	63 kg
Gold medal – first place	1966 Luxembourg	63 kg
Gold medal – first place	1967 Rome	63 kg
Silver medal – second place	1968 Lausanne	63 kg
Silver medal – second place	1970 East Berlin	63 kg
Silver medal – second place	1972 Voorburg	63 kg

Sergey Suslin (9 November 1944 – 1989) was a Soviet judoka and sambist. He competed in the men's lightweight event at the 1972 Summer Olympics.

== Criminal activity and conviction ==
Since 1977, he worked as stuntman at the Lenfilm studio, playing minor roles in several Soviet action film. While there, together with other athletes who were employed as stuntmen at the Lenfilm, he took part in robberies and other criminal acts. In 1981, he was arrested and sentenced to 9 years in prison for the murder of his wife. He was released in 1989. He died the same year in Moscow after suffering a heart attack.

According to Nikolay Vashchilin, a USSR Master of Sports in sambo, the future President of Russia Vladimir Putin and his childhood friend Arkady Rotenberg were associates with the gang of Suslin and Vyacheslav Ivankov in the early 1970s. Suslin's case in the archives is still classified. Nowadays, a memorial judo sports tournament is being held in his honor.

== Sources ==
- Nishioka, Hayward (June 1970). "Black Belt Exclusive: an interview with Russia's controversional judoka [Interpreted by Igor Zatsepin]". Black Belt. 8 (6): 42–44.
