= Kim Yong-ik (judoka) =

North Korean judoka

Personal information
- Born: 17 May 1947 (age 79)
- Occupation: Judoka

Korean name
- Hangul: 김용익
- RR: Gim Yongik
- MR: Kim Yongik

Sport
- Country: North Korea
- Sport: Judo
- Weight class: ‍–‍63 kg

Achievements and titles
- Olympic Games: (bronze) (1972)
Medal record
Men's judo
Representing North Korea
Olympic Games
Bronze medal – third place	1972 Munich	‍–‍63 kg

Profile at external databases
- IJF: 54469
- JudoInside.com: 8708
- Updated on 22 June 2023

Kim Yong-ik (born 17 May 1947) is a North Korean former judoka who competed in the 1972 Summer Olympics.
