= Gustaaf Lauwereins =

Belgian judoka

Personal information
- Nationality: Belgian
- Born: 21 June 1941 (age 83); Preston, England

Sport
- Sport: Judo

Gustaaf Lauwereins (born 21 June 1941) is a Belgian judoka. He competed in the men's lightweight event at the 1972 Summer Olympics.
