= David Starbrook =

British judoka (born 1945)

David Starbrook MBE
Personal information
- Full name: David Colin Starbrook
- Born: 9 August 1945 (age 80) Croydon, South London, UK
- Occupation: Judoka
- Height: 185 cm (6 ft 1 in)

Sport
- Country: Great Britain
- Sport: Judo
- Weight class: ‍–‍80 kg, ‍–‍93 kg
- Club: Renshuden Judo Club, London

Achievements and titles
- Olympic Games: (silver) (1972)
- World Champ.: (bronze) (1971, 1973)
- European Champ.: (silver) (1973)
Medal record
Men's judo
Representing Great Britain
Olympic Games
Silver medal – second place	1972 Munich	‍–‍93 kg
Bronze medal – third place	1976 Montreal	‍–‍93 kg
World Championships
Bronze medal – third place	1971 Ludwigshafen	‍–‍80 kg
Bronze medal – third place	1973 Lausanne	‍–‍93 kg
European Championships
Silver medal – second place	1973 Madrid	‍–‍93 kg
Bronze medal – third place	1974 London	‍–‍93 kg
Bronze medal – third place	1975 Lyon	‍–‍93 kg

Profile at external databases
- IJF: 54403
- JudoInside.com: 5000
- Updated on 21 June 2023

David Colin (Colon) Starbrook MBE (born 9 August 1945) is a British retired judoka. Between 1972 and 1976 he won two silver and five bronze medals at the Olympic Games, world and European championships. Starbrook has 4 children: Joanne, Sam, Leon, and Emily.

Starbrook took up judo at the age of 19 which is relatively late to succeed in becoming a Judo Olympian. He is the author of the book Judo, Starbrook style. He lives in France where he continues to practise and coach judo. His son, Leon, is also a judoka. In November 2007 at the Judo World Cup in Birmingham he was awarded his 9th Dan by Densign White, chairman of the British Judo Association.
