= Jean-Paul Coche =

French judoka (born 1947)

Personal information
- Born: 25 July 1947 (age 78)
- Occupation: Judoka

Sport
- Country: France
- Sport: Judo
- Weight class: ‍–‍80 kg

Achievements and titles
- Olympic Games: (bronze) (1972)
- World Champ.: (bronze) (1975)
- European Champ.: (gold) (1972, 1974, 1976)
Medal record
Men's judo
Representing France
Olympic Games
| Bronze medal – third place | 1972 Munich | ‍–‍80 kg |
World Championships
| Bronze medal – third place | 1975 Vienna | ‍–‍80 kg |
European Championships
| Gold medal – first place | 1972 Voorburg | ‍–‍80 kg |
| Gold medal – first place | 1974 London | ‍–‍80 kg |
| Gold medal – first place | 1976 Kyiv | ‍–‍80 kg |
European Junior Championships
| Silver medal – second place | 1968 London | ‍–‍80 kg |
| Bronze medal – third place | 1966 Lyon | ‍–‍80 kg |

Profile at external databases
- IJF: 54395
- JudoInside.com: 5081
- Updated on 22 June 2023

Jean-Paul Coche (born 25 July 1947) is a French former judoka who competed in the 1972 Summer Olympics and in the 1976 Summer Olympics.
