= Edward Mullen =

British judoka

Personal information
- Nationality: British
- Born: 22 June 1949 (age 75)

Sport
- Sport: Judo

Edward Mullen (born 22 June 1949) is a British judoka. He competed in the men's lightweight event at the 1972 Summer Olympics.
