= 1973 World Judo Championships =

Judo competition

Judo 1973 Men's World Judo Championships
- Venue: Palais de Beaulieu
- Location: Lausanne, Switzerland
- Dates: 22–24 June 1973
- Competitors: 288 from 50 nations

Competition at external databases
- Links: IJF • JudoInside

The 1973 World Judo Championships were the eighth edition of the men's World Judo Championships, and were held in Lausanne, Switzerland from June 22–24, 1973.

== Medal overview ==
=== Men ===
Event	Gold	Silver	Bronze
-63 kg	(Japan) Yoshiharu Minami	(Japan) Takao Kawaguchi	(Soviet Union) Shengeli Pitskhelauri (Cuba) Hector Rodriguez
-70 kg	(Japan) Toyokazu Nomura	(East Germany) Dietmar Hötger	(Soviet Union) Anatoliy Novikov (Japan) Kazuo Yoshimura
-80 kg	(Japan) Shozo Fujii	(Japan) Isamu Sonoda	(East Germany) Bernd Look (Poland) Antoni Reiner
-93 kg	(Japan) Nobuyuki Sato	(Japan) Takafumi Ueguchi	(East Germany) Dietmar Lorenz (United Kingdom) David Starbrook
+93 kg	(Japan) Chonosuke Takagi	(Soviet Union) Dzhibilo Nizharadze	(Soviet Union) Sergei Novikov (United Kingdom) Keith Remfry
Open	(Japan) Kazuhiro Ninomiya	(Japan) Haruki Uemura	(Germany) Klaus Glahn (East Germany) Wolfgang Zuckschwerdt

=== Medal table ===
Rank	Nation	Gold	Silver	Bronze	Total
1	Japan	6	4	1	11
2	East Germany	0	1	3	4
2	Soviet Union	0	1	3	4
4	Great Britain	0	0	2	2
5	Cuba	0	0	1	1
5	Poland	0	0	1	1
5	West Germany	0	0	1	1
Totals (7 entries)		6	6	12	24
