= Klaus Glahn =

West German judoka (born 1942)

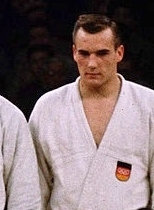
- Klaus Glahn at the 1964 Olympics

Personal information
- Born: 23 March 1942 (age 84) Hannover, Germany
- Occupation: Judoka
- Height: 1.87 m (6 ft 2 in)

Sport
- Country: West Germany
- Sport: Judo
- Weight class: +93 kg, Open
- Rank: 9th dan black belt
- Club: VfL Wolfsburg

Achievements and titles
- Olympic Games: (silver) (1972)
- World Champ.: (silver) (1967, 1969, 1971)
- European Champ.: (gold) (1963, 1968, 1970)
Medal record
Men's judo
Representing Germany
Olympic Games
Bronze medal – third place	1964 Tokyo	Open
Representing West Germany
Olympic Games
Silver medal – second place	1972 Munich	+93 kg
World Championships
Silver medal – second place	1967 Salt Lake City	Open
Silver medal – second place	1969 Mexico City	+93 kg
Silver medal – second place	1971 Ludwigshafen	+93 kg
Bronze medal – third place	1971 Ludwigshafen	Open
Bronze medal – third place	1973 Lausanne	Open
European Championships
Gold medal – first place	1963 Genève	ama +80 kg
Gold medal – first place	1968 Lausanne	+93 kg
Gold medal – first place	1970 Berlin	+93 kg

Profile at external databases
- IJF: 54559
- JudoInside.com: 4807
- Updated on 24 June 2023

Klaus Glahn (born 23 March 1942) is a retired West German judoka who competed at the 1964 and 1972 Olympics. In 1964 he won a bronze medal in the openweight class while representing the United Team of Germany. Eight years later he won a silver medal for West Germany in the heavyweight category. Between 1967 and 1973 Glahn won five medals at World Championships in the heavyweight and open divisions. He also won three European heavyweight titles, in 1963, 1968 and 1970.

From 1985 to 1988 Glahn was president of the German Judo Federation. He also worked as a manager at Volkswagen Group.

In the 2000s Glahn was active in politics. He was a leading candidate from the Rentnerinnen- und Rentner-Partei (RRP) at the 2009 European Parliament election.
