= 1971 World Judo Championships =

Judo competition

Judo 1971 Men's World Judo Championships
- Venue: Friedrich-Ebert-Halle
- Location: Ludwigshafen, West Germany
- Dates: 2–4 September 1971
- Competitors: 310 from 52 nations

Competition at external databases
- Links: IJF • JudoInside

The 1971 World Judo Championships were the seventh edition of the men's World Judo Championships, and were held at the Friedrich-Ebert-Halle in Ludwigshafen, West Germany from 2–4 September, 1971.

== Medal overview ==
=== Men ===
Event	Gold	Silver	Bronze
-63 kg	(Japan) Takao Kawaguchi	(Japan) Toyokazu Nomura	(South Korea) Choi Jong-Sam (Soviet Union) Sergey Suslin
-70 kg	(Japan) Hideki Tsuzawa	(Japan) Hiroshi Minatoya	(East Germany) Dietmar Hötger (Poland) Antoni Zajkowski
-80 kg	(Japan) Shozo Fujii	(Japan) Yoshinari Shigematsu	(France) Guy Auffray (United Kingdom) David Starbrook
-93 kg	(Japan) Fumio Sasahara	(Japan) Nobuyuki Sato	(East Germany) Helmut Howiller (Brazil) Chiaki Ishii
+93 kg	(Netherlands) Wim Ruska	(Germany) Klaus Glahn	(Japan) Hisakazu Iwata (United Kingdom) Keith Remfry
Open	(Japan) Masatoshi Shinomaki	(Soviet Union) Vitali Kusnetzov	(Germany) Klaus Glahn (Japan) Shinobu Sekine

=== Medal table ===
Rank	Nation	Gold	Silver	Bronze	Total
1	Japan	5	4	2	11
2	Netherlands	1	0	0	1
3	Soviet Union	0	1	1	2
3	West Germany	0	1	1	2
5	East Germany	0	0	2	2
5	Great Britain	0	0	2	2
7	Brazil	0	0	1	1
7	France	0	0	1	1
7	Poland	0	0	1	1
7	South Korea	0	0	1	1
Totals (10 entries)		6	6	12	24
