= Judo at the 1972 Summer Olympics =

Judo Judo at the Games of the XX Olympiad
- Venues: Messegelände (competition rounds); Boxhalle (finals)
- Location: Munich, Bavaria, Germany
- Dates: 31 August – 4 September 1972
- Competitors: 144 from 46 nations

Competition at external databases
- Links: IJF • JudoInside

The Judo competition at the 1972 Summer Olympics was the return of the sport following its absence at the 1968 Summer Olympics in Mexico City. Medals were awarded in six weight classes, and competition was restricted to men only. Among the highlights was Wim Ruska of the Netherlands winning gold medals in both the heavyweight and open class competition, becoming the first judoka to win two Olympic gold medals.

== Medal summary ==
Games	Gold	Silver	Bronze
Lightweight; 63 kg	Takao Kawaguchi; Japan	vacant	Kim Yong-ik; North Korea
Lightweight; 63 kg	Takao Kawaguchi; Japan	vacant	Jean-Jacques Mounier; France
Half middleweight 70 kg	Toyokazu Nomura; Japan	Antoni Zajkowski; Poland	Dietmar Hötger; East Germany
Half middleweight 70 kg	Toyokazu Nomura; Japan	Antoni Zajkowski; Poland	Anatoliy Novikov; Soviet Union
Middleweight; 80 kg	Shinobu Sekine; Japan	Oh Seung-lip; South Korea	Jean-Paul Coche; France
Middleweight; 80 kg	Shinobu Sekine; Japan	Oh Seung-lip; South Korea	Brian Jacks; Great Britain
Half-heavyweight; 93 kg	Shota Chochishvili; Soviet Union	David Starbrook; Great Britain	Paul Barth; West Germany
Half-heavyweight; 93 kg	Shota Chochishvili; Soviet Union	David Starbrook; Great Britain	Chiaki Ishii; Brazil
Heavyweight +93 kg	Wim Ruska; Netherlands	Klaus Glahn; West Germany	Motoki Nishimura; Japan
Heavyweight +93 kg	Wim Ruska; Netherlands	Klaus Glahn; West Germany	Givi Onashvili; Soviet Union
Open category	Wim Ruska; Netherlands	Vitali Kuznetsov; Soviet Union	Jean-Claude Brondani; France
Open category	Wim Ruska; Netherlands	Vitali Kuznetsov; Soviet Union	Angelo Parisi; Great Britain

== Medal table ==
Rank	Nation	Gold	Silver	Bronze	Total
1	Japan	3	0	1	4
2	Netherlands	2	0	0	2
3	Soviet Union	1	1	2	4
4	Great Britain	0	1	2	3
5	West Germany	0	1	1	2
6	Poland	0	1	0	1
6	South Korea	0	1	0	1
8	France	0	0	3	3
9	Brazil	0	0	1	1
9	East Germany	0	0	1	1
9	North Korea	0	0	1	1
Totals (11 entries)		6	5	12	23

== Participating countries ==
- Argentina (1)
- Australia (4)
- Austria (5)
- Belgium (3)
- Brazil (2)
- Canada (5)
- Costa Rica (1)
- Cuba (3)
- Czechoslovakia (1)
- Dominican Republic (2)
- East Germany (5)
- Finland (1)
- France (5)
- Great Britain (5)
- Hong Kong (1)
- Hungary (5)
- Ireland (5)
- Italy (3)
- Japan (5)
- Lebanon (2)
- Liechtenstein (2)
- Madagascar (4)
- Mali (2)
- Mexico (3)
- Mongolia (5)
- Morocco (3)
- Netherlands (3)
- New Zealand (1)
- Nicaragua (1)
- North Korea (2)
- Philippines (3)
- Poland (5)
- Portugal (2)
- Puerto Rico (3)
- Republic of China (4)
- Senegal (5)
- Soviet Union (5)
- South Korea (4)
- Spain (1)
- Suriname (1)
- Sweden (1)
- Switzerland (5)
- Thailand (1)
- United States (5)
- West Germany (5)
- Yugoslavia (4)
