= François Besson =

French water polo player (born 1968)

Personal information
- Nationality: French
- Born: 27 June 1968 (age 56); Lyon, France

Sport
- Sport: Water polo

François Besson (born 27 June 1968) is a French water polo player. He competed in the men's tournament at the 1992 Summer Olympics.
