= Pierre Albertini (judoka) =

French judoka (1942–2017)

Personal information
- Nationality: French
- Born: 4 January 1942 15th arrondissement of Paris, Paris, France
- Died: 27 January 2017 (aged 75) Conches-sur-Gondoire, Seine-et-Marne, France
- Occupation: Judoka

Sport
- Sport: Judo
Medal record
Representing France
Summer Universiade
Bronze medal – third place	1967 Tokyo	Half-middleweight

Profile at external databases
- JudoInside.com: 5032

Pierre Dominique Albertini (4 January 1942 – 27 January 2017) was a French judoka. He competed in the men's half-heavyweight event at the 1972 Summer Olympics in Munich, finishing 7th.

He won a silver medal in the half-heavyweight division up to 93 kg at the 1967 European Judo Championships in Rome. He also won a bronze medal at the 1967 Summer Universiade in Tokyo. In 1970 he won the national championship in the half-heavyweight category. He achieved a dan in judo. This is one of the rankings in the sport. After his fighting career he became a coach. He was the National Technical Director for the French Judo Federation.

He was also involved in table tennis. He was the president of the French Table Tennis Federation and an executive, for the International Table Tennis Federation.
