= Guy Auffray =

French judoka (1945–2021)

Personal information
- Nationality: French
- Born: 8 February 1945; Diénay, France
- Died: 11 January 2021 (aged 75)
- Occupation: Judoka
- Years active: 1967–1976
- Height: 180 cm (5 ft 11 in)
- Weight: 80 kg (176 lb)

Sport
- Sport: Judo
- Rank: 9th dan black belt

Profile at external databases
- JudoInside.com: 5036

Guy Auffray (8 February 1945 – 11 January 2021) was a French judoka. He was active from 1967 to 1976 and was a Red Belt 9th degree.

== Awards ==
- Gold Medal for the 80 kg class at the 1971 European Judo Championships
- Bronze Medal for the 80 kg class at the 1971 World Judo Championships
- Silver Medal for the 80 kg class at the 1973 European Judo Championships
