= Santiago Ojeda (judoka) =

Spanish judoka

Personal information
- Nationality: Spanish
- Born: 1 July 1944 Gáldar, Las Palmas, Spain
- Died: 3 March 1997 (aged 52) Las Palmas, Spain
- Occupation: Judoka

Sport
- Sport: Judo

Profile at external databases
- JudoInside.com: 5946

Santiago Ojeda (1 July 1944 – 3 March 1997) was a Spanish judoka. He competed in the men's heavyweight event at the 1972 Summer Olympics.
