= Pierre Guichard =

French historian and academic (1939–2021)

- Born: 5 November 1939; La Côte-Saint-André, France
- Died: 6 April 2021 (aged 81)
- Occupations: Historian; Academic

Pierre Guichard (5 November 1939 – 6 April 2021) was a French historian, archeologist, medievalist, and academic. He specialized in Al-Andalus and western Muslims during the Middle Ages.

== Biography ==
A professor of history at Lumière University Lyon 2, Guichard directed the Centre interuniversitaire d'histoire et d'archéologie médiévales from 1994 to 2003. He studied the history of Muslim Spain and its relations with the Christian world. He was a member of the Casa de Velázquez in Madrid. He became a correspondent for the Académie des Inscriptions et Belles-Lettres on 27 March 1998.

Pierre Guichard died on 6 April 2021 at the age of 81.

== The Guichard Hypothesis ==
In the years 1976–1977, historian Pierre Guichard challenged the notion that Arab and Berber invasions after 711 AD did not have much demographic and sociopolitical impact. This concept was labeled the “Guichard hypothesis”. Examples of the invasions' influence were primarily demonstrated through 3 variables. At the time, Arab clans practiced endogamy and this concept became a norm in Iberian society. The practice of endogamy overall prevented assimilation between Arab clans and the local civilians, as intermarriage did not happen. In addition to this, the concept of segmentary lineage called for increased cohesion in new settlements. This allowed the invaders to sustain themselves and grow prosperously in the newly acquired areas. Thirdly, the massive influx of Arab and Berber Muslims throughout the first two to three centuries following the invasions allowed for these ethnic groups to be the majority demographic in the Iberian Peninsula. These factors shaped the development of political and cultural practices in the peninsula for years.

== Works ==
=== Books ===
- Structures sociales « orientales » et « occidentales » dans l'Espagne musulmane (1977)
- Les châteaux ruraux d'al-Andalus. Histoire et archéologie des husun du sud-est de l'Espagne (1988)
- Les Musulmans de Valence et la Reconquête (1991)
- Du parchemin au papier. Comprendre le XIIIe siècle, in Mélanges offerts à Marie-Thérèse Lorcin (1995)
- États, sociétés et cultures dans le monde musulman médiéval (2000)
- Espagne et Sicile musulmanes aux XIe et XIIe siècles (2000)
- Relations des pays d'islam avec le monde latin (2000)
- Al-Andalus, 711-1492 (2001)
- Les royaumes de taifas (2007)
- Les débuts du monde musulman, VIIe-Xe siècle (2012)

=== Articles ===
- Le peuplement de la région de Valence aux deux premiers siècles de la domination musulmane (1969)
- Les villes d'al-Andalus et de l'Occident musulman aux premiers siècles de leur histoire. Genèse de la ville islamique en al-Andalus et au Maghreb occidental (1998)
- À propos de l'identité andalouse: Quelques éléments pour un débat (1999)
- La maîtrise de l'eau en al-Andalus, Paysages, pratiques et techniques, article: L'aménagement et la mise en culture des marjales de la région valencienne au début du XIVe siècle
