= Martin Poglajen =

Dutch judoka

Personal information
- Nationality: Dutch
- Born: 28 September 1942 (age 83) Essen, Germany
- Occupation: Judoka

Sport
- Sport: Judo

Profile at external databases
- JudoInside.com: 4413

Martin Poglajen (born 28 September 1942) is a Dutch judoka. He competed in the men's middleweight event at the 1972 Summer Olympics.
