= 1965 European Judo Championships =

1965 Judo European Judo Championships
- Venue: Community of Madrid Sports Centre
- Location: Madrid, Spain
- Dates: 23–24 May 1965

Competition at external databases
- Links: JudoInside

The 1965 European Judo Championships were the 14th edition of the European Judo Championships, and were held in Madrid, Spain, from 23 to 24 May 1965. The Championships were held in two separate categories: amateur (seven events) and professional (six events). The amateur contests were subdivided into six individual competitions, and a separate team competition. As the Soviet and other Socialist judokas were competing on a strictly non-profit basis, they were allowed to compete both professionally, and as amateurs. As before, more than one representative of a single national team were allowed to qualify for participation in each event.

== Medal overview ==
=== Amateurs ===
Event	Gold	Silver	Bronze
63 kg	(Soviet Union) Oleg Stepanov	(Soviet Union) Alexey Ilyushin	(France) Serge Feist (Austria) Karl Reisinger
70 kg	(France) André Bourreau	(East Germany) Günther Wiesner	(Austria) Manfred Penz (East Germany) Joachim Schröder
80 kg	(West Germany) Wolfgang Hofmann	(France) Lionel Grossain	(Soviet Union) Anatoli Bondarenko (East Germany) Otto Smirat
93 kg	(Soviet Union) Ansor Kibrokachvili	(France) Yves Reymond	(France) Jacques Le Berre (Netherlands) Jan Snijders
93+ kg	(East Germany) Herbert Niemann	(Soviet Union) Parnaoz Chikviladze	(West Germany) Horst Lieder (Netherlands) Wim Ruska
Open class	(Soviet Union) Anzor Kiknadze	(Netherlands) Wim Ruska	(France) Jean-Pierre Dessailly (Soviet Union) Anatoli Saunin

==== Amateur medal table ====
Rank	Nation	Gold	Silver	Bronze	Total
1	Soviet Union (URS)	3	2	2	7
2	France (FRA)	1	2	3	6
3	East Germany (GDR)	1	1	2	4
4	West Germany (FRG)	1	0	1	2
5	Netherlands (NED)	0	1	2	3
6	Austria (AUT)	0	0	2	2
Totals (6 entries)		6	6	12	24

=== Professionals ===
Event	Gold	Silver	Bronze
63 kg	(Soviet Union) Alexey Ilyushin	(Soviet Union) Sergey Suslin	(Poland) Kazimierz Jaremczak (Netherlands) Anton Linskens
70 kg	(Soviet Union) Vladimir Kuspish	(United Kingdom) Brian Jacks	(Spain) Salvador Álvarez (Czechoslovakia) Michal Vachun
80 kg	(Netherlands) Martin Poglajen	(France) Patrick Clement	(United Kingdom) Ray Ross (France) Gérard Buc
93 kg	(Soviet Union) Anatoly Yudin	(Netherlands) Joop Gouweleeuw	(United Kingdom) Anthony Sweeney (East Germany) Karl Nitz
93+ kg	(Soviet Union) Parnaoz Chikviladze	(West Germany) Guenther Monczyk	(Netherlands) Anton Geesink (France) Alphonse Lemoine
Open class	(Germany) Alfred Meier	(United Kingdom) Syd Hoare	(Netherlands) Anton Geesink (France) Jacques Noris

==== Professional medal table ====
Rank	Nation	Gold	Silver	Bronze	Total
1	Soviet Union (URS)	4	1	0	5
2	Netherlands (NED)	1	1	3	5
3	West Germany (FRG)	1	1	0	2
4	Great Britain (GBR)	0	2	2	4
5	France (FRA)	0	1	3	4
6	Czechoslovakia (TCH)	0	0	1	1
6	East Germany (GDR)	0	0	1	1
6	Poland (POL)	0	0	1	1
6	Spain (ESP)	0	0	1	1
Totals (9 entries)		6	6	12	24

=== Teams ===
Event	Gold	Silver	Bronze
Team	(Soviet Union) Soviet team: Aron Bogolyubov; Anatoli Bondarenko; Anzor Kiknadze; Anzor Kibrotsashvili; Oleg Stepanov	(Netherlands) Dutch team: Anton Geesink; Joop Gouweleeuw; Martin Poglajen; Willem Ruska; Peter Snijders	(France) French team: André Bourreau; Serge Feist; Georges Gress; Lionel Grossain; Jacques Le Berre (East Germany) East German team: Paul Barth; Helmut Howiller; Herbert Niemann; Otto Smirat; Günther Wiesner

== Overall medal table ==
Rank	Nation	Gold	Silver	Bronze	Total
1	Soviet Union (URS)	7	3	2	12
2	West Germany (FRG)	2	1	1	4
3	France (FRA)	1	3	6	10
4	Netherlands (NED)	1	2	5	8
5	East Germany (GDR)	1	1	3	5
6	Great Britain (GBR)	0	2	2	4
7	Austria (AUT)	0	0	2	2
8	Czechoslovakia (TCH)	0	0	1	1
8	Poland (POL)	0	0	1	1
8	Spain (ESP)	0	0	1	1
Totals (10 entries)		12	12	24	48
