= 1963 European Judo Championships =

1963 Judo European Judo Championships
- Venue: Patinoire des Vernets
- Location: Geneva, Switzerland
- Date: 11 May 1963

Competition at external databases
- Links: JudoInside

The 1963 European Judo Championships were the 12th edition of the European Judo Championships, and were held in Geneva, Switzerland on 11 May 1963. The Championships were held in two separate categories: amateur (five events) and professional (four events). The amateur contests were subdivided into four individual competitions, and a separate team competition. The Soviet and other Socialist judokas were allowed to compete professionally but on a strictly non-profit basis. As before, more than one representative of a single national team were allowed to qualify for participation in each event.

== Medal overview ==
=== Amateurs ===
Event	Gold	Silver	Bronze
68 kg	(France) André Bourreau	(Italy) Bruno Carmeni	(Poland) Jan Okroj (Austria) Gerhard Zotter
80 kg	(France) Jacques Le Berre	(East Germany) Otto Smirat	(West Germany) Peter Herrmann (Socialist Federal Republic of Yugoslavia) Stojan Stojaković
80+ kg	(West Germany) Klaus Glahn	(Soviet Union) Anzor Kibrotsashvili	(Soviet Union) Boris Mishchenko (East Germany) Herbert Niemann
Open class	(East Germany) Karl Nitz	(Italy) Nicola Tempesta	(France) Georges Gress (United Kingdom) Anthony Sweeney

==== Amateur medal table ====
Rank	Nation	Gold	Silver	Bronze	Total
1	France (FRA)	2	0	1	3
2	East Germany (GDR)	1	1	1	3
3	West Germany (FRG)	1	0	1	2
4	Italy (ITA)	0	2	0	2
5	Soviet Union (URS)	0	1	1	2
6	Austria (AUT)	0	0	1	1
6	Great Britain (GBR)	0	0	1	1
6	Poland (POL)	0	0	1	1
6	Yugoslavia (YUG)	0	0	1	1
Totals (9 entries)		4	4	8	16

=== Professionals ===
Event	Gold	Silver	Bronze
68 kg	(Soviet Union) Aron Bogolyubov	(United Kingdom) Richard Bowen	(France) Robert Forestier (Soviet Union) Robert Dzhgamadze
80 kg	(France) Jacques Noris	(United Kingdom) George Kerr	(United Kingdom) David Barnard (France) Marcel Nottola
80+ kg	(Netherlands) Anton Geesink	(Netherlands) Willem Dadema	(United Kingdom) Douglas Young (East Germany) Armin Lindner
Open class	(Netherlands) Anton Geesink	(Netherlands) Henk Warmerdam	(France) Michel Yacoubovitch (East Germany) Helmut Howiller

==== Professional medal table ====
Rank	Nation	Gold	Silver	Bronze	Total
1	Netherlands (NED)	2	2	0	4
2	France (FRA)	1	0	3	4
3	Soviet Union (URS)	1	0	1	2
4	Great Britain (GBR)	0	2	2	4
5	East Germany (GDR)	0	0	2	2
Totals (5 entries)		4	4	8	16

=== Teams ===
Event	Gold	Silver	Bronze
Team	(Soviet Union) Soviet team: Robert Dzhgamadze; Alfred Karatschuk; Anzor Kiknadze; Vladimir Pankratov; Oleg Stepanov; Genrikh Shults	(West Germany) West German team: Wolfgang Ehler; Peter Herrmann; Kurt Leise; Ferdinand Miebach; Günter Monczyk; Matthias Schießleder	(France) French team: André Bourreau; Jean-Pierre Dessailly; Georges Gress; Lionel Grossain; Jacques Le Berre; Michel Lesturgeon (Belgium) Belgian team: Pierre Brouha; Marcel Clause; Henri Dewandeleer; Max Deweer; Désiré Durieux; Marcel Etienne

== Overall medal table ==
Rank	Nation	Gold	Silver	Bronze	Total
1	France	3	0	4	7
2	Netherlands	2	2	0	4
3	East Germany	1	1	3	5
4	Soviet Union	1	1	2	4
5	West Germany	1	0	1	2
6	United Kingdom	0	2	3	5
7	Italy	0	2	0	2
8	Austria	0	0	1	1
8	Poland	0	0	1	1
8	Yugoslavia	0	0	1	1
Total		8	8	16	32
