= 1964 European Judo Championships =

1964 Judo European Judo Championships
- Location: East Berlin, East Germany
- Dates: 25–26 May 1964

Competition at external databases
- Links: JudoInside

The 1964 European Judo Championships were the 13th edition of the European Judo Championships, and were held in East Berlin, East Germany on 25 and 26 April 1964. The Championships were held in three separate categories: junior (three events), amateur (five events), and professional (four events). The amateur contests were subdivided into four individual competitions, and a separate team competition, which was held in East Berlin on 18 May. The Soviet and other Socialist judokas were allowed to compete professionally but on a strictly non-profit basis. As before, more than one representative of a single national team were allowed to qualify for participation in each event. Soviet judokas won the judo crown, leading the overall medal table.

== Medal overview ==
=== Juniors ===
Event	Gold	Silver	Bronze
68 kg	(Belgium) Jacques Tanguy	(Netherlands) Tino Hoogendijk	(Socialist Federal Republic of Yugoslavia) Kakanović (Hungary) Nadas
80 kg	(United Kingdom) Brian Jacks	(Czechoslovakia) Radek Vaňátko	(East Germany) Wolf (France) Philippe Baudin
80+ kg	(France) Patrick Rychkoff	(Socialist Federal Republic of Yugoslavia) Matjaž Smolnikar	(East Germany) Knoch (Belgium) Martin Segers

==== Junior medal table ====
Rank	Nation	Gold	Silver	Bronze	Total
1	Belgium (BEL)	1	0	1	2
1	France (FRA)	1	0	1	2
3	Great Britain (GBR)	1	0	0	1
4	Yugoslavia (YUG)	0	1	1	2
5	Czechoslovakia (TCH)	0	1	0	1
5	Netherlands (NED)	0	1	0	1
7	East Germany (GDR)	0	0	2	2
8	Hungary (HUN)	0	0	1	1
Totals (8 entries)		3	3	6	12

=== Amateurs ===
Event	Gold	Silver	Bronze
68 kg	(France) André Bourreau	(Netherlands) Anton Linskens	(East Germany) Günther Wiesner (Switzerland) Eric Hänni
80 kg	(Soviet Union) Anatoly Bondarenko	(Soviet Union) Ilya Tsipursky	(Netherlands) Jan Snijders (East Germany) Otto Smirat
80+ kg	(East Germany) Herbert Niemann	(Soviet Union) Parnaoz Chikviladze	(France) Jean-Claude Brondani (United Kingdom) Tony McConnell
Open class	(Soviet Union) Anzor Kiknadze	(France) Jean-Pierre Dessailly	(France) Alphonse Lemoine (East Germany) Helmut Howiller

==== Amateur medal table ====
Rank	Nation	Gold	Silver	Bronze	Total
1	Soviet Union (URS)	2	2	0	4
2	France (FRA)	1	1	2	4
3	East Germany (GDR)	1	0	3	4
4	Netherlands (NED)	0	1	1	2
5	Great Britain (GBR)	0	0	1	1
5	Switzerland (SUI)	0	0	1	1
Totals (6 entries)		4	4	8	16

=== Professionals ===
Event	Gold	Silver	Bronze
68 kg	(Soviet Union) Aron Bogolyubov	(Austria) Karl Reisinger	(United Kingdom) Brian Jacks (France) Michel Lesturgeon
80 kg	(France) Lionel Grossain	(France) Jacques Noris	(Netherlands) Peter Snijders (United Kingdom) George Kerr
80+ kg	(Netherlands) Anton Geesink	(Netherlands) Johan Schaeffer	(United Kingdom) Anthony Sweeney (France) Marcel Lenormand
Open class	(Netherlands) Anton Geesink	(Netherlands) Martin Poglajen	(France) Michel Franceschi (East Germany) Frank Gonschorek

==== Professional medal table ====
Rank	Nation	Gold	Silver	Bronze	Total
1	Netherlands (NED)	2	2	1	5
2	France (FRA)	1	1	3	5
3	Soviet Union (URS)	1	0	0	1
4	Austria (AUT)	0	1	0	1
5	Great Britain (GBR)	0	0	3	3
6	East Germany (GDR)	0	0	1	1
Totals (6 entries)		4	4	8	16

=== Teams ===
Event	Gold	Silver	Bronze
Team	(Soviet Union) Soviet team: Aron Bogolyubov; Anatoli Bondarenko; Parnaoz Chikviladze; Alfred Karatschuk; Anzor Kiknadze; Oleg Stepanov	(Netherlands) Dutch team: Coos Bonte; Anton Geesink; Manfred Kuypers; Jaap Mackay; Willem Ruska; Jan Snijders	(France) French team: Michel Bourgoin; André Bourreau; Lionel Grossain; Jacques Le Berre; Michel Lesturgeon; Mathieu Vallauri (East Germany) East German team: Manfred Birkholz; Helmut Howiller; Herbert Niemann; Otto Smirat; Günther Wiesner; Erich Zielke

== Overall medal table ==
Note: Excluding the junior and team championships

Rank	Nation	Gold	Silver	Bronze	Total
1	Soviet Union (URS)	3	2	0	5
2	Netherlands (NED)	2	3	2	7
3	France (FRA)	2	2	5	9
4	East Germany (GDR)	1	0	4	5
5	Austria (AUT)	0	1	0	1
6	Great Britain (GBR)	0	0	4	4
7	Switzerland (SUI)	0	0	1	1
Totals (7 entries)		8	8	16	32
