= 1962 European Judo Championships =

1962 Judo European Judo Championships
- Location: Essen, West Germany
- Dates: 12–14 May 1962

Competition at external databases
- Links: JudoInside

The 1962 European Judo Championships were the 11th edition of the European Judo Championships, and were held in Essen, West Germany on 12 and 13 May 1962. The Championships were held in two separate categories: amateur (nine events) and professional (four events). The amateur contests were subdivided into weight classes (four events), experience classes (four events), and a separate team competition (one event). The professional contests were subdivided only into weight classes. It was the first edition of the European Judo Championships to host judokas from the Socialist countries (Eastern European and Soviet), though they did not participate in the professional contests as professional sports were banned in those countries. Contrary to the modern Olympic-based practice of entering one athlete per weight class, more than one representative of a single national team was allowed to qualify for participation in each event. The professional category (then called the "open category") was established for those teaching judo, and hence not considered amateurs in the Olympics' category. This later precluded Anton Geesink from participating in the amateur weight classes at the judo event of the 1964 Olympics.

== Medal overview ==
=== Amateurs ===
Event	Gold	Silver	Bronze
Experience-based events
1st dan	(Belgium) Marcel Etienne	(Soviet Union) Boris Mishchenko	(Hungary) Tamas David (West Germany) Peter Herrmann
2nd dan	(Soviet Union) Anzor Kibrotsashvili	(Italy) Remo Venturelli	(Socialist Federal Republic of Yugoslavia) Borivoje Cvejić (West Germany) Wolfgang Ehler
3rd dan	(United Kingdom) Alan Petherbridge	(Netherlands) Theo van Ierland	(France) Michel Franceschi (United Kingdom) John Ryan
4th dan	(France) Jean-Pierre Dessailly	(Italy) Nicola Tempesta	(France) Michel Bourgoin
Weight-based events
68 kg	(France) André Bourreau	(East Germany) Erich Zielke	(Czechoslovakia) Frantisek Kuna (France) Michel Lesturgeon
80 kg	(France) Lionel Grossain	(Netherlands) Jaap Mackay	(East Germany) Otto Smirat (East Germany) Alfred Karatchuk
80+ kg	(East Germany) Herbert Niemann	(Netherlands) Willem Dadema	(East Germany) Karl Nitz (Netherlands) Adri Smits
Open class	(Soviet Union) Anzor Kiknadze	(Soviet Union) Michail Lukatchev	(Netherlands) Theo van Ierland (Switzerland) Beludze

==== Amateur medal table ====
Rank	Nation	Gold	Silver	Bronze	Total
1	France (FRA)	3	0	3	6
2	Soviet Union (URS)	2	2	0	4
3	East Germany (GDR)	1	1	3	5
4	Great Britain (GBR)	1	0	1	2
5	Belgium (BEL)	1	0	0	1
6	Netherlands (NED)	0	3	2	5
7	Italy (ITA)	0	2	0	2
8	West Germany (FRG)	0	0	2	2
9	Czechoslovakia (TCH)	0	0	1	1
9	Hungary (HUN)	0	0	1	1
9	Switzerland (SUI)	0	0	1	1
9	Yugoslavia (YUG)	0	0	1	1
Totals (12 entries)		8	8	15	31

=== Professionals ===
Event	Gold	Silver	Bronze
68 kg	(Netherlands) Jan Snijders	(France) Roger Forestier	(West Germany) Franz-Hermann Fischer (West Germany) Kurt Leise
80 kg	(France) Henri Courtine	(West Germany) Gerd Stamer	(France) Romain Pacalier (Netherlands) Lange
80+ kg	(Netherlands) Anton Geesink	(France) Mathieu Vallauri	(France) Roussey (Belgium) Pierre Brouha
Open class	(Netherlands) Anton Geesink	(United Kingdom) George Kerr	(United Kingdom) Kenneth Maynard (France) André Leclerc

==== Professional medal table ====
Rank	Nation	Gold	Silver	Bronze	Total
1	Netherlands (NED)	3	0	1	4
2	France (FRA)	1	2	2	5
3	West Germany (FRG)	0	1	2	3
4	Great Britain (GBR)	0	1	1	2
5	Belgium (BEL)	0	0	1	1
Totals (5 entries)		4	4	7	15

=== Teams ===
Event	Gold	Silver	Bronze
Team	(France) French team: Michel Bourgoin; Jean-Pierre Dessailly; André Iriart; Mathieu Vallauri; André Leclerc	(Netherlands) Dutch team: Willem Dadema; Anton Geesink; Jaap Mackaay; Gerard Stroess; Theo van Ierland	(Soviet Union) Soviet team: Zurab Beruachvili; Anzor Kibrotsashvili; Anzor Kiknadze; Michail Kukasevitch; Genrikh Shults (Italy) Italian team: Giuseppe Guerriero; Romano Polverari; Nicola Tempesta; Remo Venturelli; Gino Zanchetti

== Overall medal table ==
Rank	Nation	Gold	Silver	Bronze	Total
1	France (FRA)	4	2	5	11
2	Netherlands (NED)	3	3	3	9
3	Soviet Union (URS)	2	2	0	4
4	East Germany (GDR)	1	1	3	5
5	Great Britain (GBR)	1	1	2	4
6	Belgium (BEL)	1	0	1	2
7	Italy (ITA)	0	2	0	2
8	West Germany (FRG)	0	1	4	5
9	Czechoslovakia (TCH)	0	0	1	1
9	Hungary (HUN)	0	0	1	1
9	Switzerland (SUI)	0	0	1	1
9	Yugoslavia (YUG)	0	0	1	1
Totals (12 entries)		12	12	22	46
