= Brazil at the 1964 Summer Olympics =

- IOC code: BRA
- NOC: Brazilian Olympic Committee

in Tokyo
- Competitors: 61 (60 men and 1 woman) in 11 sports
- Flag bearer: Wlamir Marques
- Medals Ranked 35th: Gold 0 Silver 0 Bronze 1 Total 1

Summer Olympics appearances (overview)
- 1920; 1924; 1928; 1932; 1936; 1948; 1952; 1956; 1960; 1964; 1968; 1972; 1976; 1980; 1984; 1988; 1992; 1996; 2000; 2004; 2008; 2012; 2016; 2020; 2024

Brazil competed at the 1964 Summer Olympics in Tokyo, Japan. 61 competitors, 60 men and 1 woman, took part in 17 events in 11 sports. The country single medal in 1964 was the bronze obtained by the men's basketball team.

== Medalists ==
Medal	Name	Sport	Event	Date
Bronze	Brazil national men's basketball team: Ubiratan Pereira Maciel; Friedrich Wilhem Braun; Jatyr Eduardo Schall; Victor Mirshawka; Edson Bispo dos Santos; Wlamir Marques; Amaury Pasos; Carlos Domingos Massoni; Carmo de Souza; Antônio Salvador Sucar; Sérgio de Toledo Machado; José Edvar Simões	Basketball	Men's tournament	October 23

Medals by sport
Sport	1st place, gold medalist(s)	2nd place, silver medalist(s)	3rd place, bronze medalist(s)	Total
Basketball	0	0	1	1
Total	0	0	1	1

Medals by gender
Gender	1st place, gold medalist(s)	2nd place, silver medalist(s)	3rd place, bronze medalist(s)	Total
Male	0	0	1	1
Female	0	0	0	0
Mixed	0	0	0	0
Total	0	0	1	1

== Athletics ==
Women
Field events

Athlete	Event	Qualification		Final	
Athlete	Event	Distance	Position	Distance	Position
Aída dos Santos	High jump	1.70	5 Q	1.74	4

== Basketball ==
=== Preliminary round ===
==== Group B ====
Qualified for the semifinals

Team	W	L	PF	PA	PD	Pts	Tie
United States	7	0	569	333	+236	14	
Brazil	5	2	473	452	+21	12	1W−0L
SFR Yugoslavia	5	2	529	453	+76	12	0W−1L
Uruguay	4	3	472	482	−10	11	
Finland	3	4	409	475	−66	10	
Australia	2	5	434	460	−26	9	1W−0L
Peru	2	5	431	453	−22	9	0W−1L
South Korea	0	7	432	641	−209	7	

11.10.1964
10:30

Brazil	50–58	Peru

Yoyogi National Gymnasium, Tokio

12.10.1964
13:30

Yugoslavia	64–68	Brazil

Yoyogi National Gymnasium, Tokio

13.10.1964
20:30

South Korea	65–92	Brazil

Yoyogi National Gymnasium, Tokio

14.10.1964
17:30

Finland	54–61	Brazil

Yoyogi National Gymnasium, Tokio

16.10.1964
13:30

Uruguay	68–80	Brazil

Yoyogi National Gymnasium, Tokio

17.10.1964
19:00

Brazil	53–86	United States

Yoyogi National Gymnasium, Tokio

18.10.1964
17:30

Australia	57–69	Brazil

Yoyogi National Gymnasium, Tokio

=== Semifinals ===
21.10.1964
17:30

Brazil	47–53	Soviet Union

Yoyogi National Gymnasium, Tokio

=== Bronze medal match ===
23.10.1964
17:30

Puerto Rico	60–76	Brazil

Yoyogi National Gymnasium, Tokio

== Boxing ==
Men

Athlete	Event	1 Round	2 Round	3 Round	Quarterfinals	Semifinals	Final	
Athlete	Event	Opposition Result	Opposition Result	Opposition Result	Opposition Result	Opposition Result	Opposition Result	Rank
Joao Henrique da Silva	Light-Welterweight	BYE	Chang Pin Cheng (ROC); W RSC-1	Keramat Nadimi (IRN); W 3-2	Eddie Blay (GHA); L 0-5	did not advance		5
Luiz Fabre	Light-Middleweight	BYE	Sayed Elnahas (EGY); L 1-4	did not advance				
Luiz Leonidas Cezar	Middleweight	BYE		Franco Valle (ITA); L 1-4	did not advance			

== Equestrian ==
=== Show jumping ===
Athlete	Horse	Event	Round 1		Round 2		Final		
Athlete	Horse	Event	Penalties	Rank	Penalties	Rank	Total	Jump-off	Rank
Nelson Pessoa	Individual	Huipil	12.00	6	8.00	3	20.00	—N/a	5

== Football ==
=== First round ===
==== Group C ====
Pos	Team	Pld	W	D	L	GF	GA	GD	Pts	Qualification
1	Czechoslovakia	3	3	0	0	12	2	+10	6	Advanced to knockout stage
2	United Arab Republic	3	1	1	1	12	6	+6	3	Advanced to knockout stage
3	Brazil	3	1	1	1	5	2	+3	3	
4	South Korea	3	0	0	3	1	20	−19	0	

Source: RSSSF
October 12, 1964
14:00

Brazil	1 – 1	United Arab Republic
Roberto 10'	Report	Shanin 88'

Komazawa Olympic Park Stadium, Setagaya, Tokyo
Attendance: 16,450
Referee: Glöckner (GDR)

October 14, 1964
14:00

Brazil	4 – 0	South Korea
Zé Roberto 30'; Elizeu 44', 54'; Roberto 73'	Report

Mitsuzawa Soccer Stadium, Yokohama, Kanagawa
Attendance: 12,672
Referee: Boukkili (MAR)

October 16, 1964
14:00

Czechoslovakia	1 – 0	Brazil
Valošek 77'	Report

Omiya Park Soccer Stadium, Omiya, Saitama
Attendance: 13,120
Referee: Tehrani (IRN)

== Judo ==
Men

Athlete	Event	Round 1	Round 2	Round 3	Elimination	Quarterfinal	Semifinal	Final / BM	
Athlete	Event	Opposition Result	Opposition Result	Opposition Result	Rank	Opposition Result	Opposition Result	Opposition Result	Rank
Lhofei Shiozawa	−80 kg	Rafael Barquero (CRC); W 1000-0000	Alfred Redl (AUT); W 1000-0000	Narzal García (PHI); W 1000-0000	1 Q	Kim Eui-Tae (KOR); L 0000-0100	did not advance		5

== Modern pentathlon ==
One male pentathlete represented Brazil in 1964.

Men

Athlete	Event	Riding (show jumping)	Fencing (épée one touch)	Shooting (25 m rapid-fire pistol)	Swimming (300 m freestyle)	Running (4000 m)	Total points	Final rank
Athlete	Event	Points	Points	Points	Points	Points	Total points	Final rank
José Wilson	Men's	940	640	940	1025	733	4278	28

== Sailing ==
Open

Athlete	Event	Race														Final rank	
Athlete	Event	1		2		3		4		5		6		7		Final rank	
Athlete	Event	Score	Rank	Score	Rank	Score	Rank	Score	Rank	Score	Rank	Score	Rank	Score	Rank	Score	Rank
Jörg Bruder	Finn	~~19~~	~~341~~	8	716	5	921	12	540	10	620	6	841	2	1318	4956	7
Joaquim Roderbourg; Klaus Hendriksen	Flying Dutchman	12	344	12	344	9	469	14	277	~~17~~	~~193~~	17	193	8	520	2147	16
Harry Adler; Luiz Ramos	Star	10	331	6	553	~~DNF~~	~~101~~	12	252	9	377	9	377	10	331	2221	11

== Swimming ==
Men

Athlete	Event	Heat		Semifinal		Final	
Athlete	Event	Time	Rank	Time	Rank	Time	Rank
Mauri Fonseca	100 metre freestyle	59.6	59	Did not advance			
Athos de Oliveira	100 metre freestyle	56.0	25	Did not advance			
Álvaro Pires	100 metre freestyle	56.8	=36	Did not advance			
Farid Zablith Filho	200 metre breaststroke	2:45.2	25	Did not advance			
Athos de Oliveira; Farid Zablith Filho; Mauri Fonseca; Álvaro Pires	4 × 100 metre medley relay	4:21.2	13	—N/a		Did not advance	

== Volleyball ==
=== Round robin ===
Pos	Team	Pld	W	L	Pts	SW	SL	SR	SPW	SPL	SPR
1	Soviet Union	9	8	1	17	25	5	5.000	415	279	1.487
2	Czechoslovakia	9	8	1	17	26	10	2.600	486	399	1.218
3	Japan	9	7	2	16	22	12	1.833	475	372	1.277
4	Romania	9	6	3	15	19	15	1.267	432	394	1.096
5	Bulgaria	9	5	4	14	20	16	1.250	464	429	1.082
6	Hungary	9	4	5	13	18	18	1.000	449	466	0.964
7	Brazil	9	3	6	12	13	23	0.565	410	474	0.865
8	Netherlands	9	2	7	11	11	24	0.458	378	482	0.784
9	United States	9	2	7	11	10	23	0.435	360	450	0.800
10	South Korea	9	0	9	9	9	27	0.333	376	500	0.752

Date		Score		Set 1	Set 2	Set 3	Set 4	Set 5	Total
13 Oct	Bulgaria	3–0	Brazil	16–14	15–10	15–6			46–30
14 Oct	Romania	3–0	Brazil	15–6	15–5	15–5			45–16
15 Oct	Netherlands	3–2	Brazil	14–16	15–11	15–12	6–15	16–14	66–68
17 Oct	Brazil	3–1	South Korea	15–12	15–8	14–16	16–14		60–50
18 Oct	Brazil	3–2	Hungary	15–4	13–15	11–15	16–14	15–11	70–59
19 Oct	Czechoslovakia	3–0	Brazil	15–5	15–6	15–10			45–21
21 Oct	Japan	3–2	Brazil	15–12	15–9	12–15	7–15	15–11	64–62
22 Oct	Brazil	3–2	United States	5–15	11–15	15–9	15–6	15–9	61–54
23 Oct	Soviet Union	3–0	Brazil	15–7	15–6	15–9			45–22

=== Team roster ===
- João Cláudio França
- José da Costa
- Hamilton de Oliveira
- Emanuel Newdon
- Feitosa
- Marco Antônio Volpi
- Carlos Arthur Nuzman
- Josias Ramalho
- Décio de Azevedo
- Victor Barcellos Borges
- Giuseppe Mezzasalma
- Pedro Barbosa de Oliveira

Head coach: Samy Mehlinski

== Water polo ==
=== Preliminary round ===
==== Group C ====
Team	Pld	W	L	PF	PA	PD	Pts
Yugoslavia	3	3	0	17	3	+14	6
Netherlands	3	2	1	11	13	−2	5
United States	3	1	2	12	9	+3	4
Brazil	3	0	3	3	18	−15	3

1964-10-11

Netherlands	3–2	Brazil

Yoyogi National Gymnasium, Tokyo

1964-10-12

United States	7–1	Brazil

Yoyogi National Gymnasium, Tokyo

1964-10-13

Yugoslavia	8–0	Brazil

Yoyogi National Gymnasium, Tokyo
