= Judo at the 1964 Summer Olympics – Men's 80 kg =

Judo competition

Men's 80kg at the Games of the XVIII Olympiad
- Venue: Nippon Budokan
- Date: 21 October 1964
- Competitors: 25 from 20 nations

Medalists
1st place, gold medalist(s)		Isao Okano	Japan
2nd place, silver medalist(s)		Wolfgang Hofmann	United Team of Germany
3rd place, bronze medalist(s)		James Bregman	United States
3rd place, bronze medalist(s)		Kim Eui-Tae	South Korea

The middleweight class was a judo event held as part of the Judo at the 1964 Summer Olympics programme. The weight class was the second-lightest contested, and allowed judokas of up to eighty kilograms. The competition was held on Wednesday, October 21, 1964.

Twenty-five judokas from twenty nations competed.

== Results ==
=== Elimination round ===
The twenty-five competitors were divided into seven pools of three and one group of four. Each pool played a round-robin tournament, with the winner of the pool advancing to the quarterfinals.

Pool A

Place	Judoka	Score	Qual.
1	Rodolfo Pérez (ARG)	2–0	QQ
2	Kanapathy Moorthy (MAS)	1–1	
3	Bernardo Repuyan (PHI)	0–2	

Pool B

Place	Judoka	Score	Qual.
1	James Bregman (USA)	2–0	QQ
2	Gabriel Goldschmied (MEX)	1–1	
3	Peter Paige (AUS)	0–2	

Pool C

Place	Judoka	Score	Qual.
1	Wolfgang Hofmann (EUA)	2–0	QQ
2	Jacques le Berré (FRA)	1–1	
3	Orlando Madrigal (CRC)	0–2	

Pool D

Place	Judoka	Score	Qual.
1	Peter Snijders (NED)	2–0	QQ
2	Pipat Singsanee (THA)	1–1	
3	Thai Thuc Thuan (VIE)	0–2	

Pool E

Place	Judoka	Score	Qual.
1	Lhofei Shiozawa (BRA)	3–0	QQ
2	Alfred Redl (AUT)	2–1	
3	Narzal García (PHI)	1–2	
4	Rafael Barquero (CRC)	0–3	

Pool F

Place	Judoka	Score	Qual.
1	Kim Eui-Tae (KOR)	2–0	QQ
2	Huang Chin-chun (ROC)	1–1	
3	Lê Bả Thành (VIE)	0–2	

Pool G

Place	Judoka	Score	Qual.
1	Lionel Grossain (FRA)	2–0	QQ
2	Jan Snijders (NED)	1–1	
3	Sydney Hoare (GBR)	0–2	

Pool H

Place	Judoka	Score	Qual.
1	Isao Okano (JPN)	2–0	QQ
2	Fernando Matos (POR)	1–1	
3	Jorge Lugo (VEN)	0–2	

=== Knockout rounds ===
The remaining eight judokas competed in a single elimination bracket. Losers in the quarterfinals were placed 5–8 while both losers in the semifinals won bronze medals.

Quarterfinals; October 21		Semifinals; October 21		Final; October 21
Isao Okano (JPN)	Okuri-eri-jime
Lionel Grossain (FRA)	5:18	Isao Okano (JPN)	Waza-ari-chikai-waza
Kim Eui-Tae (KOR)	Awase-waza	Kim Eui-Tae (KOR)	–
Lhofei Shiozawa (BRA)	1:33			Isao Okano (JPN)	Yoko-shiho-gatame
Wolfgang Hofmann (EUA)	Uchi-mata			Wolfgang Hofmann (EUA)	1:36
Peter Snijders (NED)	3:10	Wolfgang Hofmann (EUA)	Udehishigi-juji-gatame
James Bregman (USA)	Awase-waza	James Bregman (USA)	1:21
Rodolfo Pérez (ARG)	5:16

== Sources ==
- Tokyo Organizing Committee (1964). The Games of the XVIII Olympiad: Tokyo 1964, vol. 2.
