= 1966 European Judo Championships =

1966 Judo European Judo Championships
- Location: Luxembourg City, Luxembourg
- Dates: 6–7 May 1966

Competition at external databases
- Links: JudoInside

The 1966 European Judo Championships were the 15th edition of the European Judo Championships, and were held in Luxembourg City, Luxembourg from 6 to 7 May 1966. Championships were subdivided into six individual competitions, and a separate team competition. Individual events were not discriminated into amateur and professional as before.

== Medal overview ==
=== Individual ===
Event	Gold	Silver	Bronze
63 kg	(Soviet Union) Sergey Suslin	(France) Jean-Claude Meslaye	(France) Serge Feist (Netherlands) Theo Klein
70 kg	(Soviet Union) Oleg Stepanov	(Poland) Czeslaw Laksa	(East Germany) Joachim Schroeder (Soviet Union) Aron Bogolyubov
80 kg	(Netherlands) Peter Snijders	(Soviet Union) Vladimir Pokatayev	(Netherlands) Martin Poglajen (Soviet Union) Georgy Kotik
93 kg	(Netherlands) Joop Gouweleeuw	(West Germany) Peter Herrmann	(Soviet Union) Anzor Kibrotsashvili (Soviet Union) Anatoly Yudin
93+ kg	(Netherlands) Willem Ruska	(Soviet Union) Parnaoz Chikviladze	(West Germany) Guenther Monczyk (United Kingdom) David Peake
Open class	(Soviet Union) Anzor Kiknadze	(West Germany) Alfred Meier	(East Germany) Klaus Hennig (Soviet Union) Vladimir Saunin

=== Teams ===
Event	Gold	Silver	Bronze
Team	(Soviet Union) Soviet team: Anzor Kibrotsashvili; Anzor Kiknadze; Vladimir Pokatayev; Oleg Stepanov; Sergey Suslin	(France) French team: Serge Feist; Armand Desmet; Patrick Clement; Pierre Albertini; Georges Gress	(East Germany) East German team: Wolfgang Micka; Herbert Niemann; Dieter Scholz; Otto Smirat; Günther Wiesner (Netherlands) Dutch team: Joop Gouweleeuw; Theo Klein; Martin Poglajen; Willem Ruska; Peter Snijders

=== Medal table ===
Rank	Nation	Gold	Silver	Bronze	Total
1	Soviet Union (URS)	3	2	5	10
2	Netherlands (NED)	3	0	2	5
3	West Germany (FRG)	0	2	1	3
4	France (FRA)	0	1	1	2
5	Poland (POL)	0	1	0	1
6	East Germany (DDR)	0	0	2	2
7	Great Britain (GBR)	0	0	1	1
Totals (7 entries)		6	6	12	24
