= Noriaki Bunasawa =

Japanese judoka

Nori Bunasawa
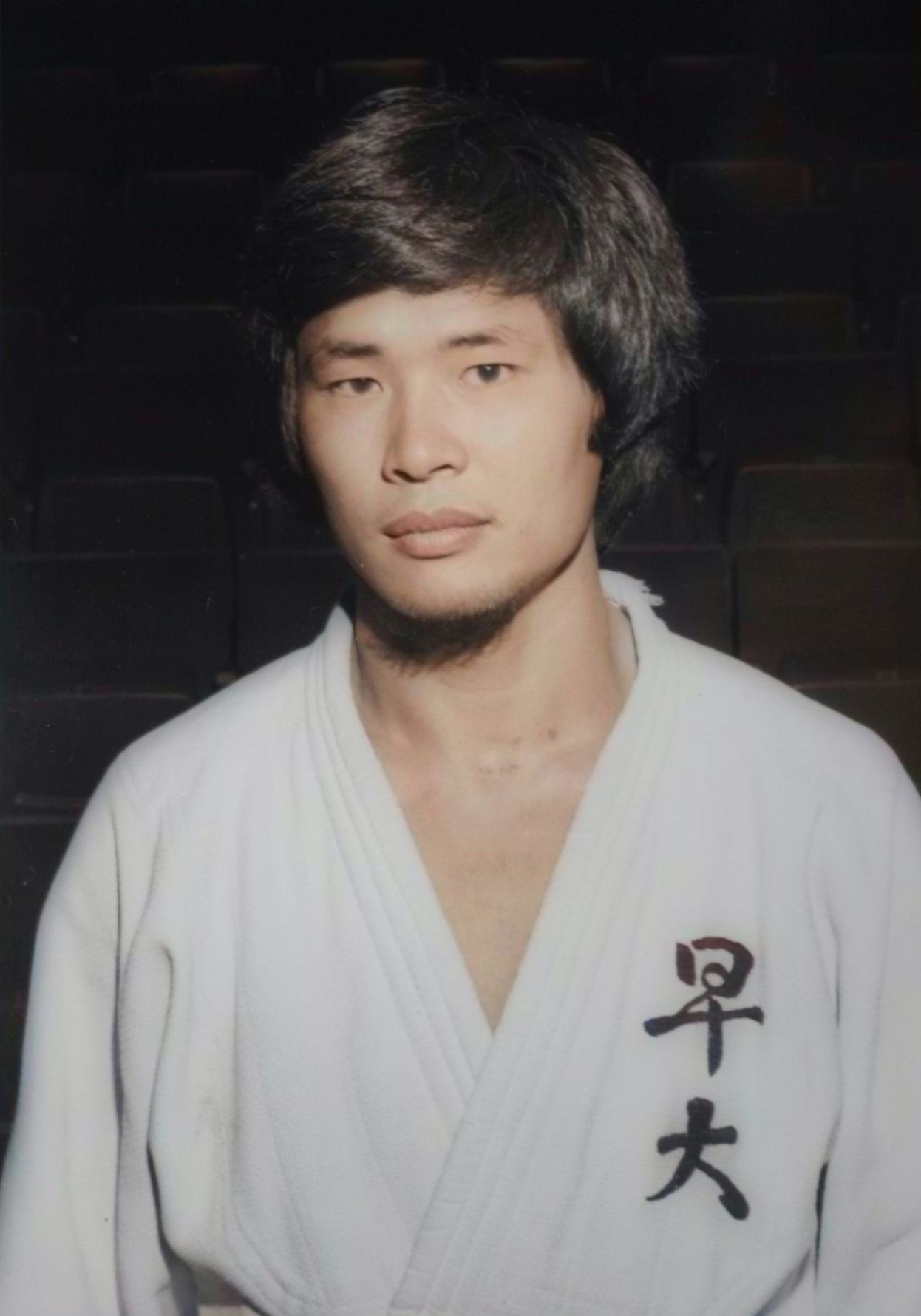
- Bunasawa in 1975
- Born: Noriaki Bunasawa; November 3, 1947 (age 78); Saitama, Japan
- Style: Jūkkendo; Judo
- Teachers: Yoshimi Osawa; Hideo Yamamoto; Masahiko Kimura
- Rank: Jūkkendo: Founder; Judo: 9th dan

Other information
- Occupation: Judoka, Judo instructor, Actor, Writer, Publisher, Founder of Jūkkendo
- University: Waseda University

Noriaki "Nori" Bunasawa (樗沢憲昭, Bunasawa Noriaki; born November 3, 1947) is a Japanese and American judoka, a former USA judo coach at the 1972 Olympic games in Munich and at the 1975 World Judo Championships in Vienna. He is also a judo and jujutsu researcher, Japanese martial arts historian, actor, and co-author of The Toughest Man Who Ever Lived, a novel based on the life of Mitsuyo Maeda. He founded the Judo Journal newspaper which became Judo Jiujitsu Pro-fighting Journal. He was also the press chief for the IJF at the 1996 Olympic games in Atlanta.

He is also the founder of Jūkkendo (柔拳道), a martial arts system based on the prize fighting methods of Mitsuyo Maeda.

== Early life and education ==
Nori Bunasawa was born on November 3, 1947, in Saitama, Japan. As a high school student, he practiced with the Waseda University judo team with his older brother (Ryuji Bunasawa, professor emeritus at the International Budo University and current head coach at Waseda University).

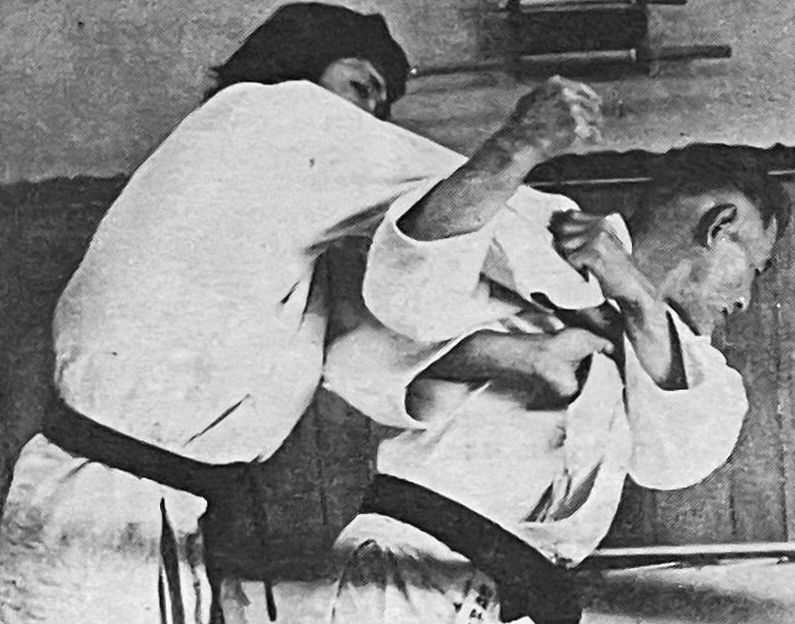
Masahiko Kimura performs a modified ippon-seoi-nage on Nori Bunasawa

In 1966 he enrolled at Waseda University and officially joined the judo club. He learned judo under Yoshimi Osawa, Hideo Yamamoto and Masahiko Kimura. He graduated with a Bachelor's degree in the social sciences. During his time in university, in 1968, he became champion at the Tokyo Student Judo Championships by weight class. In 1969, he earned a silver medal in the lightweight (-70 kg) division at the All-Japan Judo Weight Category Championships by facing world champions Hiroshi Minatoya, Hirofumi Matsuda, Asian champion Yujiro Yamazaki and defeating the latter two. He defeated Yamazaki and Matsuda in the first round and semi-finals. In the final match, he was initially in the lead by throwing Minatoya with reverse ippon seoi-nage. Bunasawa's special techniques were tai-otoshi, ippon seoi-nage, osoto-gari, and tomoe-nage.

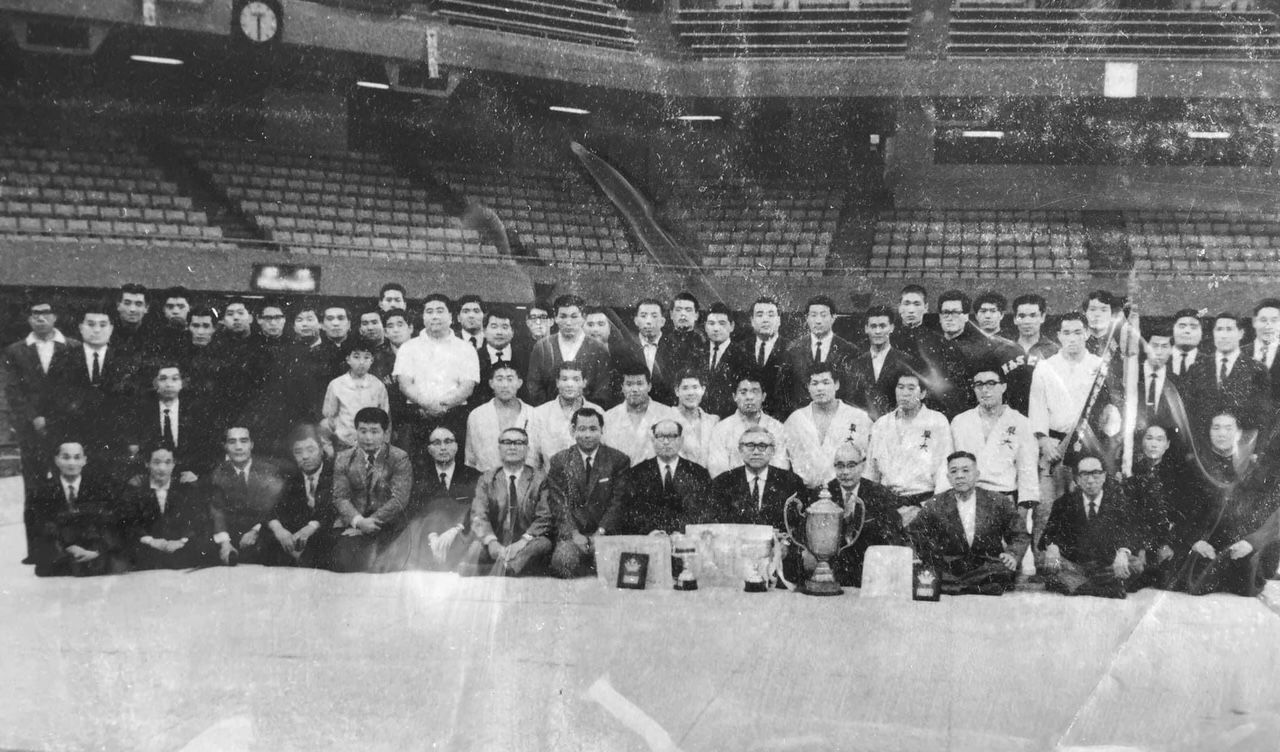
Pictured is Yoshimi Osawa (8th from the left, front row), Hideo Yamamoto (9th from the left, front row) with Nori Bunasawa (4th from the left, center row, wearing a judogi)

In August 1969, he was invited to the Japanese national training camp in the mountains of the Nagano prefecture which served as tryouts for the Japanese Judo World team. Others also present at the training camp included future Olympic gold medalist Toyokazu Nomura, Isamu Sonoda and world champion Yoshio Sonoda. At the end of the tryouts, the All Japan Judo Federation and its chairman Shohei Hamano (of Shikoku) selected Hiroshi Minatoya and Yoshimitsu Kono (of Shikoku) as the main representatives. Bunasawa and future world champion Hisashi Tsuzawa were selected as reserves for the lightweight (-70 kg) division for the 1969 World Judo Championships. The decision to send Kono to the 1969 World Judo Championships was controversial as Kono lost in the first round to Matsuda, who was eliminated by Bunasawa in the semi-finals at the All-Japan Judo Weight Category Championships which served a world championship qualifier.

== Career ==
In 1972, he coached the US team that competed at the 1972 Olympic games in Munich.

In 1975, he was appointed as the head judo instructor of the 6 million dollar (adjusted to 36 million dollars in 2024) Ichiban Sports center in Arkansas, which was founded by automobile tycoon Willard Robertson. According to Dale Samuels, the former vice president of the USJA, the Ichiban Sports center was the "most advanced" training facility in the US at the time.

In 1975, Bunasawa coached the US team that competed at the 1975 World Judo Championships in Vienna.

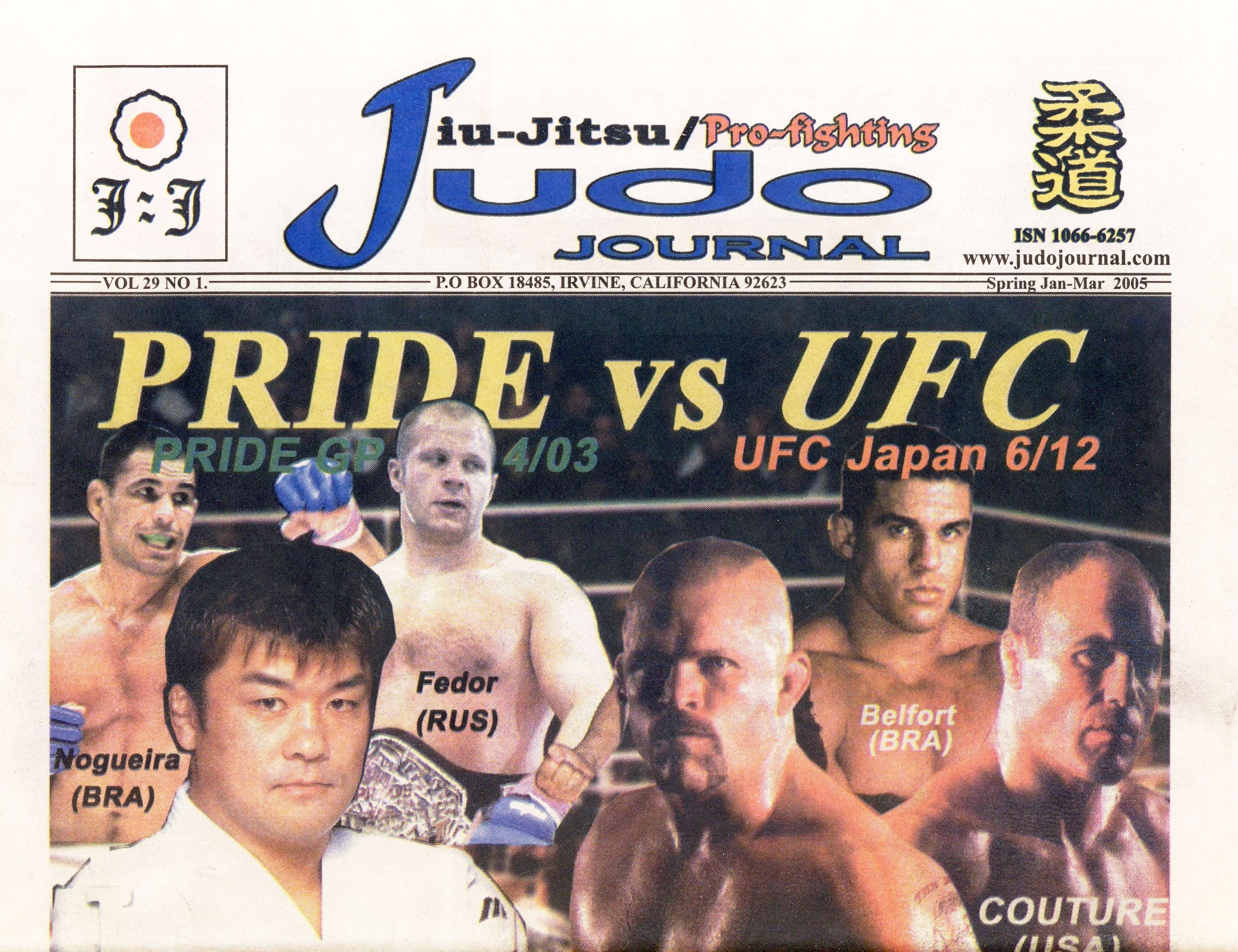
『Judo Jiujitsu Pro-fighting Journal』Vol.29 No.1

In 1978, he founded Judo Journal, newspaper which covered sports judo. Judo Journal eventually became Judo Jiujitsu Pro-fighting Journal, which covered combat sports such as judo, BJJ, sumo, karate, kickboxing, etc. and the final issue was published in April 2006.

From 1995 to 2007, the Mitsuyo Maeda story was published as a series in Judo Journal. In 2007, the collection was published in novel form as The Toughest Man Who Ever Lived, with John Murray as a co-author.

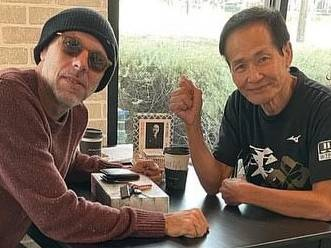
José Padilha and Bunasawa in October 2023

In 2019, a major Hollywood production company decided to adapt The Toughest Man Who Ever Lived into a film. The film will be directed by José Padilha. Bunasawa was stated to be the script and technical adviser and the fight choreographer.

In November 2024, he returned to international competition at the Judo Veterans World Championships held in Las Vegas. He competed in the M9 -60 kg division and won a bronze medal.

== List of Works ==
- The Toughest Man Who Ever Lived (with John Murray, 2007, ISBN 978-0-9648984-1-7)

== Filmography ==
=== Film ===
Year	Title	Role	Notes
1990	Martial Marshal	Gonji Tamashita	Lead role
2006	Letters from Iwo Jima	Japanese Journalist	
