= Doug Rogers (judoka) =

Canadian judoka (1941–2020)

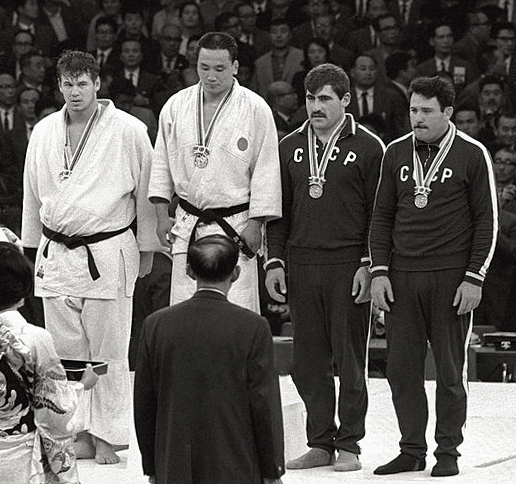
- Doug Rogers, Isao Inokuma, Parnaoz Chikviladze and Anzor Kiknadze at the 1964 Olympics

Personal information
- Full name: Alfred Harold Douglas Rogers
- Born: January 26, 1941 Truro, Nova Scotia, Canada
- Died: July 20, 2020 (aged 79) Vancouver, British Columbia
- Occupation: Judoka
- Height: 1.90 m (6 ft 3 in)
- Weight: 118 kg (260 lb) (1964)

Sport
- Country: Canada
- Sport: Judo
- Weight class: +80 kg, +93 kg, Open
- Rank: 7th dan black belt
- Club: Takushoku University, Tokyo
- Coached by: Masahiko Kimura; Frank Hatashita

Achievements and titles
- Olympic Games: (silver) (1964)
- World Champ.: (bronze) (1965)
- Pan American Champ.: (1965)
Medal record
Men's judo
Representing Canada
Olympic Games
| Silver medal – second place | 1964 Tokyo | +80 kg |
World Championships
| Bronze medal – third place | 1965 Rio de Janeiro | +80 kg |
Pan American Games
| Gold medal – first place | 1967 Winnipeg | Open |
| Silver medal – second place | 1967 Winnipeg | +93 kg |
Pan American Championships
| Gold medal – first place | 1965 Guatemala | Open |

Profile at external databases
- IJF: 54617, 54551
- JudoInside.com: 8736
- Updated on June 25, 2023

Alfred Harold Douglas Rogers (January 26, 1941 – July 20, 2020) was a Canadian Olympic competitor in judo, and the first Canadian to win an Olympic medal in the sport. He was an honoured member in the Canadian Sports Hall of Fame. His best results were a silver medal in the 1964 Tokyo Olympics and a gold medal at the Pan American Games, in 1967. He was a student of Masahiko Kimura.

== Biography ==
Doug Rogers arrived in Japan in 1960 at the age of 19 with the specific intention of working on his judo. As a youth he had won the Ontario Minor Hockey Championships, where he finished the tournament's highest-scoring defenceman. At age 15, he had joined the judo club at the Montreal YMCA. It was not long before his sensei there told him there was nothing left for him to teach and directed him over to Fred Okimura's Montreal Seidokan dojo. He continued practicing while in high school, winning the Eastern Canada brown belt (ikkyu) title in 1958. The following year he won the black belt title. Although Rogers was accepted by McGill University, having been accepted to the Kodokan, Rogers boarded a plane for Japan in 1960.

The best judo competitors at the time in Japan were coming out of the police academy and universities. These competitors would visit the Kodokan for practice on a weekly basis. Training at the Kodokan, Rogers made an effort to train with the judoka from the police academy and nearby Takushoku University (Takudai). It was in this way that he got to meet Masahiko Kimura, who was the coach of Takudai University and one of its more famous alumni.

Able to hold his own against top judoka in Japan, the Canadian Olympic Committee, in search of medal hopefuls and, moreover, pleased that he was already in Japan where the Olympics were to be held, recruited Rogers. Rogers decided, however, to return to Canada to compete in the national championships, and the Olympic Committee were at first reluctant to pay for Rogers' airfare back to Japan. Eventually they settled for paying for a one-way ticket.

Rogers' day at the Olympics is best described by Frank Moritsugu, a contemporary of his:

With coach Frank Hatashita at matside, on that October 1964 day at the Budokan, Doug had an easy time in the early rounds. In the semis he clearly decisioned a tough opponent, the bull-like Soviet competitor P. Chikviladze, eliminating one of the possible winners. Then came the heavy weight finals where his opponent was Isao Inokuma, the all-Japan champion. Inokuma was shorter and many pounds lighter but much more experienced and perhaps Japan's supreme judo technician. And he was an occasional training partner of Rogers at the Kodokan. Theirs was a hard-fought match which we watched agonizingly on our TV sets here in Canada. Neither man could throw the other cleanly although both managed to complete throws which ended off the tatami. At the end of a truly championship bout, it was a narrow decision for Inokuma but with his silver medal, Doug Rogers had become Canada's first judoka to mount the Olympic medal podium at the first Olympics where judo was included.

Parts of Rogers' silver medal-winning performance against Isao Inokuma at the Tokyo 1964 Summer Olympics are included in the documentary film Tokyo Olympiad (1965) directed by Kon Ichikawa.

=== Post Olympics ===
After the Olympics, Rogers trained full-time with Kimura and the Takudai team. In the summer of 1965 Rogers participated in the All-Japan University Championships as a member of the Takushoku University team and helped them bring the winner's pennant back to Takudai for the first time in several years. Not only was Doug the first non-Asian foreigner to take part in this tournament, he was also named the tournament's best fighter.

Rogers felt very close to Kimura, regarded him as a father figure and stayed in touch with him until his death in 1993. Kimura demanded a very high level of physical fitness and concentrated on training simple, strong judo moves. His training style was somewhat informal compared to the strict etiquette and bowing rituals practiced in the western world to this day. Kimura often came onto the mats in sweat pants and threw on a judogi only as needed to demonstrate a technique.

Despite being encouraged by Kimura to stay another year, Rogers decided to return to Canada to pursue becoming a professional pilot, having attained a private operator's license at age 16. After a summer tour with the Takudai team to a number of Japanese universities, Rogers left Japan in 1965, seen off by his teammates carrying their winner's pennants and by his coach Masahiko Kimura.

Doug Rogers went on to win gold at two Pan-American games and several Canadian National championships. Another mark of his judo skill is his taking of 5th place at the 1972 Olympics despite having been out of serious training for many years. Once in Canada, he was spending hours a day in a cockpit rather than on the mats. He no longer had Kimura as a coach nor did he have the quality of practice opponents that a world champion needed.

Rogers retired from a career as an airline pilot. He was married with four grown children. Although less active in judo later in life, he still went to local tournaments and was often an invited guest/coach at clubs throughout Greater Vancouver, British Columbia.

== See also ==
- Judo in Quebec
- Judo in British Columbia
- Judo in Canada
- List of Canadian judoka
