= Thuc Tuan Thai =

Vietnamese judoka (1925–2019)

Thái Thúc Thuần
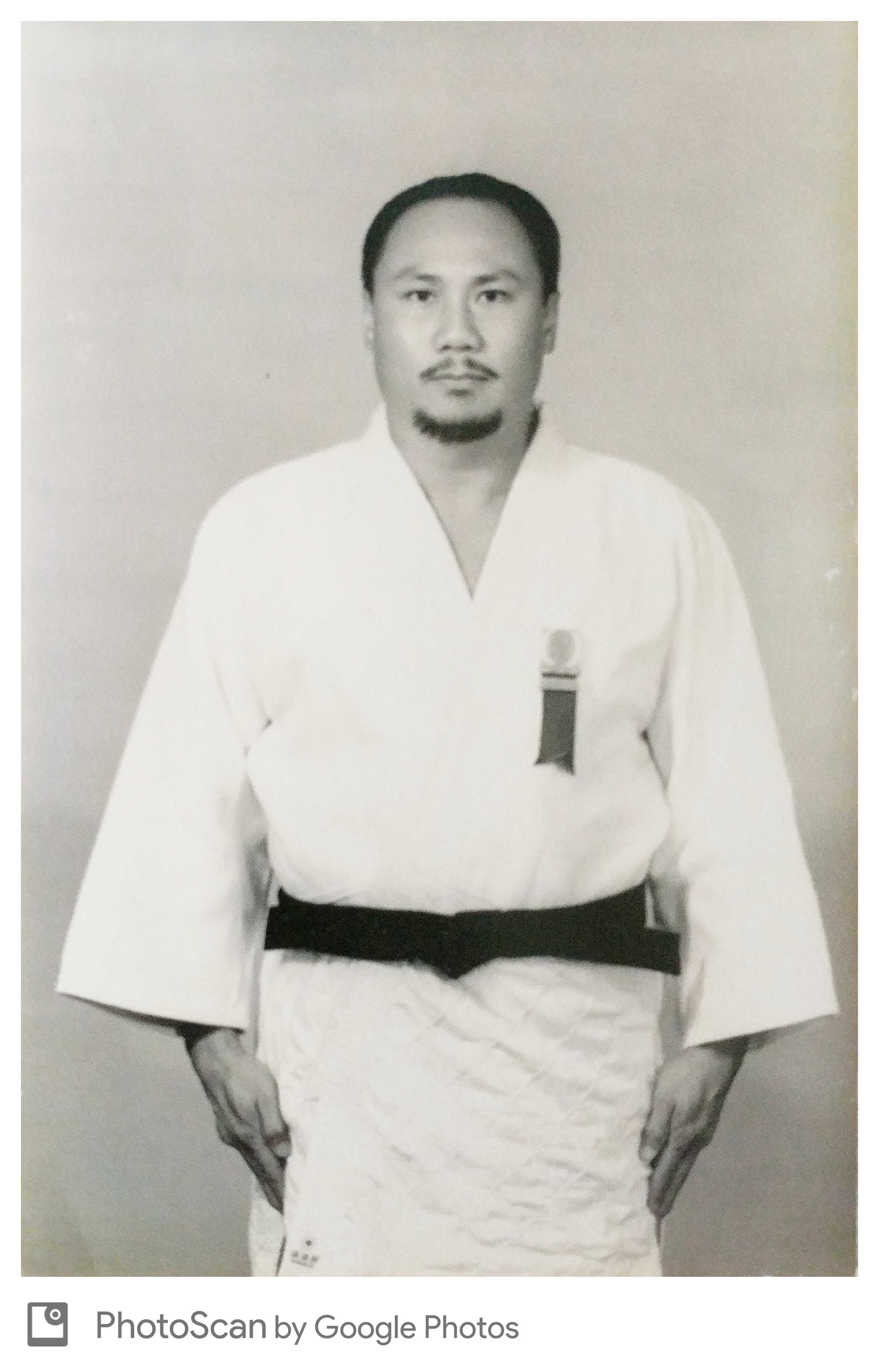

Personal information
- Born: March 28, 1925 Vietnam
- Died: April 18, 2019 (aged 94) Los Angeles, California, United States
- Occupation: Judoka

Sport
- Sport: Judo

Profile at external databases
- JudoInside.com: 12859

Thái Thúc Thuần (March 28, 1927 – April 18, 2019) was a Vietnamese judoka who founded the Vietnamese Judo Federation in 1956. He was an Olympic competitor for the former Republic Of South Vietnam. He competed in the middleweight division.

At the 1964 Summer Olympics, he lost to Peter Snijders and Pipat Sinhasema. He was listed in Black Belt Magazine as a participant within the 1964 Olympic games.
