= Judo at the 1964 Summer Olympics – Men's +80 kg =

Judo competition

Men's +80kg at the Games of the XVIII Olympiad
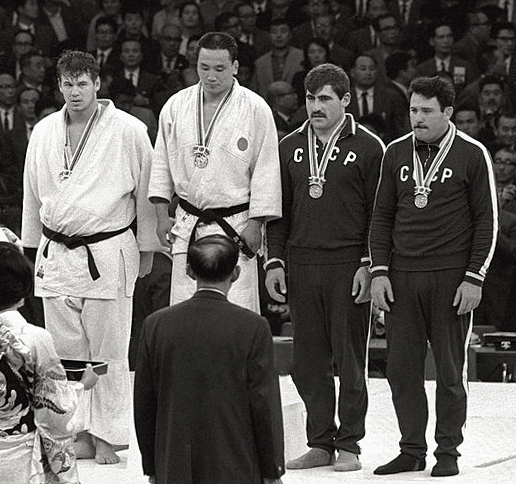
- Left-right: Doug Rogers, Isao Inokuma, Parnaoz Chikviladze and Anzor Kiknadze
- Venue: Nippon Budokan
- Date: 22 October 1964
- Competitors: 14 from 12 nations

Medalists
1st place, gold medalist(s)		Isao Inokuma	Japan
2nd place, silver medalist(s)		Doug Rogers	Canada
3rd place, bronze medalist(s)		Parnaoz Chikviladze	Soviet Union
3rd place, bronze medalist(s)		Anzor Kiknadze	Soviet Union

The heavyweight class was a judo event held as part of the Judo at the 1964 Summer Olympics programme. The weight class was the heaviest contested, and allowed judokas over eighty kilograms. The competition was held on Thursday, October 22, 1964.

Fourteen judokas from twelve nations competed. The final between Inokuma and Rogers was a draw with Inokuma given a preference for a slightly higher activity. Little occurred in the first 10 minutes, and the referee Charles Palmer threatened to disqualify both and award no gold medal, yet with little effect.

== Results ==
=== Elimination round ===
The fifteen competitors were divided into five pools of three. Each pool played a round-robin tournament, with the winner of the pool advancing to the quarterfinals.

Pool A

Place	Judoka	Score	Qual.
1	Doug Rogers (CAN)	2-0	QQ
2	Chang Chung-huei (ROC)	1-1	
3	Salvador Goldschmied (MEX)	0-2	

Pool B

Place	Judoka	Score	Qual.
1	Parnaoz Chikviladze (URS)	2-0	QQ
2	George Harris (USA)	1-1	
3	Anthony Sweeney (GBR)	0-2	

Pool C

Place	Judoka	Score	Qual.
1	Anzor Kiknadze (URS)	2-0	QQ
2	Job Gouweleeuw (NED)	1-1	
3	Herbert Niemann (EUA)	0-2	

Pool D

Place	Judoka	Score	Qual.
1	Isao Inokuma (JPN)	2-0	QQ
2	Michel Casella (ARG)	1-1	
3	Ang Teck Bee (MAS)	0-2	

Pool E

Place	Judoka	Score	Qual.
1	Kim Jong-dal (KOR)	2-0	QQ
2	Nicola Tempesta (ITA)	1-1	
3	Huang Yong-chun (ROC)	0-2	

=== Knockout rounds ===
The remaining five judokas competed in a single elimination bracket. Three received a bye in the quarterfinals, leaving only one match. The loser of that match placed 5th overall, while both losers in the semifinals won bronze medals.

Quarterfinals; October 22		Semifinals; October 22		Final; October 22
Isao Inokuma (JPN)	Kusure-kami-shiho-gatame
Kim Jong-Dal (KOR)	2:57	Isao Inokuma (JPN)	Tai-otoshi
Anzor Kiknadze (URS)	-	Anzor Kiknadze (URS)	4:51
Bye	-			Isao Inokuma (JPN)	Kinsa
Doug Rogers (CAN)	-			Doug Rogers (CAN)	-
Bye	-	Doug Rogers (CAN)	Kinsa
Parnaoz Chikviladze (URS)	-	Parnaoz Chikviladze (URS)	-
Bye	-

== Sources ==
- Tokyo Organizing Committee (1964). The Games of the XVIII Olympiad: Tokyo 1964, vol. 2.
