= Barquero (surname) =

Barquero is a surname. Notable people with the surname include:

- Efraín Barquero (1931–2020), Chilean poet
- Francisco Aguilar Barquero (1857–1924), Costa Rican politician
- Laura Barquero (born 2001), Spanish pair skater
- Rafael Barquero (1934–2012), Costa Rican judoka

== See also ==
- Barquero
