= Rodolfo Pérez =

Rodolfo Pérez may refer to:

- Rodolfo Pérez (field hockey)
- Rodolfo Pérez (judoka)

== See also ==
- Rodolfo Pérez Pimentel, Ecuadorian lawyer, historian, and biographer
