= Isao Inokuma =

Japanese judoka (1938–2001)

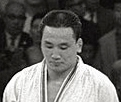
- Isao Inokuma at the 1964 Olympics

Personal information
- Born: February 4, 1938 Yokosuka, Kanagawa, Japan
- Died: September 28, 2001 (aged 63) Tokyo, Japan
- Occupation: Judoka
- Height: 1.73 m (5 ft 8 in)
- Weight: 88 kg (194 lb)

Sport
- Country: Japan
- Sport: Judo
- Weight class: +80 kg, Open

Achievements and titles
- Olympic Games: (gold) (1964)
- World Champ.: (gold) (1965)
Medal record
Men's judo
Representing Japan
Olympic Games
Gold medal – first place	1964 Tokyo	+80 kg
World Championships
Gold medal – first place	1965 Rio de Janeiro	Open

Profile at external databases
- IJF: 54636
- JudoInside.com: 5384
- Updated on June 25, 2023

Isao Inokuma (猪熊 功, Inokuma Isao; February 4, 1938 – September 28, 2001) was a Japanese judoka. He won a gold medal in the heavyweight division (above 80 kg) at the 1964 Summer Olympics in Tokyo and a world title in 1965.

== Early life and education ==
Inokuma was born in Yokosuka, Kanagawa, and took up judo at age 15, training under Riichiro Watanabe. Due to his small size, Inokuma was constantly thrown by his sparring partner Tōru Mori, but he trained hard to master ippon seoi nage, a move fitter for shorter judoka, and eventually became Mori's superior. Inokuma later became a bodybuilder under American trainers, gaining enough strength to bench press 140 kg. He always credited this with his mastery of ippon seoi nage and tai otoshi, and ultimately his success in judo competition.

He entered the Tokyo University of Education (current University of Tsukuba) and won the All-Japan Judo Championships in 1959 at only 21 years of age, to become the first student competitor to win the championship. He placed second in the All-Japan Championships in 1960 and 1961, both times losing to the future Olympic silver medalist and lifelong friend Akio Kaminaga.

== Career ==
Inokuma won the 1963 All-Japan Championships, but placed 4th in the 1964 All-Japan Championships and ended up entering the 1964 Summer Olympics in the +80 kg division (the heaviest weight category at the time excluding the open category). His main rivals there were Canadian Doug Rogers, who trained with Inokuma in Japan, and Georgian Anzor Kiknadze, who nearly defeated Inokuma in 1961 using sambo armlock techniques. Inokuma faced Kiknadze in the semifinals. He managed to avoid the armlocks and threw Kiknadze at the five minute to advance to the final against Rogers, who was about 30 kg heavier. In the final little happened in the first 10 minutes, and the referee, Charles Palmer threatened to disqualify both, with little effect. Inokuma was awarded the gold for a slightly higher activity.

After graduating, Inokuma became a judo instructor for Juntendo University and the Tokyo Metropolitan Police Department. In 1965, he entered the Open weight class of the World Judo Championships intending to wrestle Dutch judo champion Anton Geesink, but Geesink went to the +80 kg division that year, and the two never faced off against one another. Both Geesink and Inokuma won gold medals in the competition, and Inokuma announced his retirement shortly afterwards, citing lack of motivation.

== Later life and death ==
In 1966, he resigned from his post at the Tokyo Police Department to become an executive at the Tokai Construction company (東海建設株式会社). He continued to work with judo as an advisor for the International Judo Federation, and as an instructor at Tokai University, where he coached future Olympic gold medalist Yasuhiro Yamashita. He also authored several books and manuals on judo. He became the CEO of Tokai Construction in 1993.

On September 28, 2001, Inokuma died by suicide in the president's office of Tokai Construction, stabbing his carotid artery with a wakizashi, reportedly in response to the company's financial difficulties. Prior to his death, he had repeatedly summoned his subordinate, Senior Managing Director Takeshi Inoue, an aikido practitioner, to his home to rehearse the act. Inoue, who had agreed to be present, attended Inokuma at the time of his death and witnessed the act. Fourteen days after his death, on October 12, Tokai Construction was declared bankrupt with total liabilities of approximately ¥20 billion.

In 2013, Inoue published a biography co-authored with the writer Norio Kōyama, (ja) recounting Inokuma's life and final days.

== Bibliography ==
- Best Judo (with Nobuyuki Sato, 1987), Kodansha lnternational Ltd, ISBN 978-0-87011-786-2
- Weight training for championship judo (with Donn Draeger, 1966), Kodansha lnternational Ltd, ISBN 9784770000286
