= Kenichi Yamanaka =

Japanese judoka

Personal information
- Born: 29 November 1943
- Died: 26 October 2025 (aged 81)
- Occupation: Judoka

Sport
- Sport: Judo
Medal record
Men's Judo
Representing Japan
World Championships
Silver medal – second place	1965 Rio de Janeiro	-80 kg

Profile at external databases
- IJF: 62950
- JudoInside.com: 5506

Kenichi Yamanaka (山中 圏一, Yamanaka Ken'ichi; born 29 November 1943) is a retired Japanese judoka.

== Career ==
He was born in Sasebo, Nagasaki and brought up in Bungotakada, Ōita. He began judo at the age of a junior high school first grader.

In 1965, when he was student of Tenri University, got silver medal of World Championships. He also participated All-Japan Judo Championships three times, as a representative of Kinki region in 1964, 1965 and Kyūshū region in 1966. He was known as a rival of Isao Okano.

He became a teacher of the senior high school in Ōita Prefecture after graduation at a university in 1966, and entered Kuraray in 1967. He became the teacher again in 1969.

As of 2010, Yamanaka coaches judo at his dojo, Shūeikan (秀鋭館) since 1976. Among his students is former Asian champion Takamasa Anai. and retired sumo wrestler Chiyotaikai Ryūji.

== Achievements ==
- 1964 - All-Japan Championships (Openweight only) loss
- 1965 - World Championships (-80 kg) 2nd
- 1965 - All-Japan Championships (Openweight only) loss
- 1966 - All-Japan Championships (Openweight only) loss
- 1968 - All-Japan Selected Championships (Middleweight) 3rd
