= Le Berre =

Le Berre is a French surname. Notable people with the surname include:

- Jacques le Berré (born 1937), French judoka
- Mathis Le Berre (born 2001), French racing cyclist
- Nicolas le Berre (born 1976), French yacht racer
