= Gouweleeuw =

Gouweleeuw is a Dutch surname. Notable people with the surname include:

- Jeffrey Gouweleeuw (born 1991), Dutch footballer
- Joop Gouweleeuw (1940–2017), Dutch judoka
