= Shults =

Shults is an East Slavic spelling of the German surname Schulz. Notable people with the surname include:

- Genrikh Shults (1929–1999), Russian judoka and sambo practitioner
- Kostyantyn Shults (born 1993), Ukrainian football player
- Marina Shults (born 1994), Israeli group rhythmic gymnast
- Tammie Jo Shults (born 1962), American pilot
- Tia Corine Thompson Shults, also known as TiaCorine, American musician
- Trey Edward Shults (born 1988), American film director
