= Jan Snijders =

Dutch judoka (born 1943)

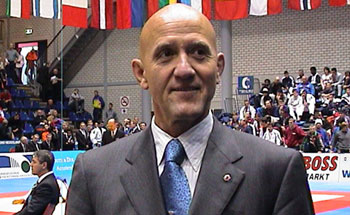
- Snijders in 2003

Personal information
- Born: 14 September 1943 (age 82) Eindhoven, North Brabant, Netherlands
- Occupation: Judoka

Sport
- Country: Netherlands
- Sport: Judo
- Rank: 9th dan black belt

Achievements and titles
- Olympic Games: 9th (1964)
- World Champ.: 5th (1969)
- European Champ.: (gold) (1962)
Medal record
Men's judo
Representing the Netherlands
European Championships
Gold medal – first place	1962 Essen	‍–‍68 kg
Bronze medal – third place	1964 Berlin	ama ‍–‍80 kg
Bronze medal – third place	1965 Madrid	ama ‍–‍93 kg
Bronze medal – third place	1969 Oostende	‍–‍80 kg
European Junior Championships
Gold medal – first place	1968 Milano	‍–‍80 kg
European Cadet Championships
Gold medal – first place	1962 Essen	‍–‍63 kg

Profile at external databases
- IJF: 4287
- JudoInside.com: 4503
- Updated on 9 March 2023

Jan Snijders (born 14 September 1943 in Eindhoven, North Brabant) is a retired judoka from the Netherlands. Together with his twin brother Peter Snijders, Anton Geesink, Hein Essink, Tonni Wagenaar, Coos Bontje, Jan van Ierland, Martin Poglajen, Joop Gouweleeuw, Wim Ruska, Ernst Eugster, Henk Numan, Peter Adelaar, Willy Wilhelm, Anthony Wurth and Theo Meyer he belongs to the generation of Dutch top judoka which gained their successes in the 1960s and 1970s.

== Judo career ==
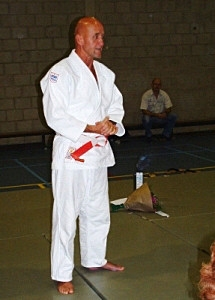

Jan Snijders started with judo in 1954. Already in 1961, he won gold in Milan on the European Championship for Juniors (Hans van Essen, 12 November 2002). In 1962, he became European champion in Essen (Germany) and in 1964, he participated in the legendary Olympic Games in Tokyo where Anton Geesink was the first European to win gold in the heaviest weight class.

In the years from 1962 up to and including 1972, he participated in the national Dutch selection, became 8 times Dutch champion, won 3 x silver and 2 x bronze medals in the European championships and became 1 x fourth and 2 x fifth in the World Championships.

Jan Snijders as well as his twin brother Peter was known, or indeed notorious, for his technical perfection (Tai Otoshi).

Jan Snijders gained in 1967 his diploma as a judo teacher and started his judo school.

== Refereeing career ==
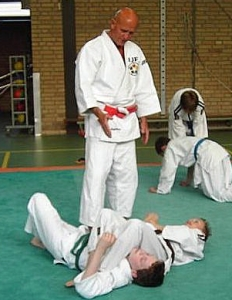

As from 1972 Jan Snijders acted as a referee, firstly national, then as from 1976 continental (E.J.U.) and as from 1984 international (I.J.F.). This way he was among other things referee at the 7th World Championships and several Olympic Games (for instance Seoul in 1988, and Barcelona in 1992). Additionally, he has been a member of the Dutch District Degrees Commission and for 7 years President of the Dutch District Referee Commission.

In 1992, Jan Snijders became a member of the E.J.U. Referee Committee and has since been actively involved in European and World championships.

At the 56th congress of the European Judo Union on 3 December 2004 in Budapest, Jan Snijders was appointed Referee Director by the Directing Committee of the EJU. In that capacity among other things, he gives guidance and seminars to E.J.U. referees (for example in Sweden, Portugal, Cyprus, Germany, France, Russia, Hungary etc. etc.). Jan Snijders has been involved in the training of E.J.U. referees, in the judo regulation/legislation and evaluation of judo techniques.

In 1990, Snijders became 7th dan grade; in 2003, he was appointed 8th dan.

In September 2003, the International Judo Federation (IJF) honored him at Osaka with the silver medal for his merits in the sport of judo.

Jan Snijders continues to teach judo in Oirschot, Bladel, Deurne and Gemert.

== Judo Sports Official ==
Anton J. Geesink, Dutch IOC representative, wrote about Jan Snijders:

Jan Snijders is a splendid example of a sport career from the bottom upwards, of athlete to sport official. Recently the EJU Directing Committee board has appointed Jan Snijders Director and Chairman of the Referee Committee of Europe, an honor up till then never accorded to a Dutchman.

Firstly a fantastic judoka, then coach, as a result of which he showed the necessary involvement. Afterwards referee in the Netherlands, then Europe and afterwards globally and now Official in the EJU. That is the ideal career that the sports official must take to represent the associations and athletes at the highest levels of interests.

== See also ==
- List of judoka
- List of judo organizations
