= Ilya Tsipursky =

Soviet judoka and sambist (1934–2022)

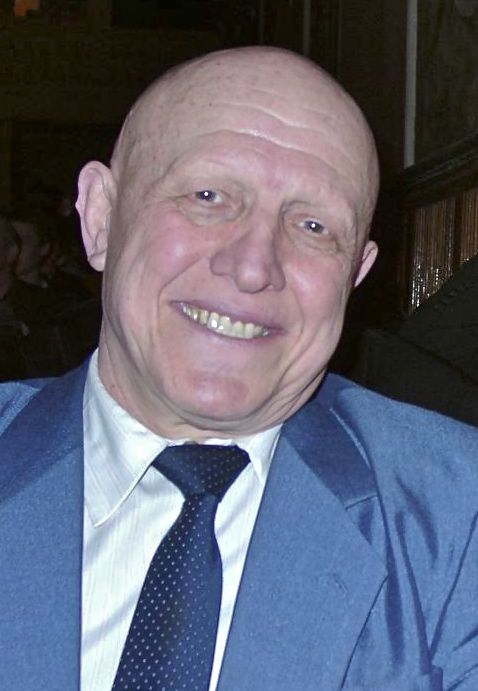
- Tsipursky in 2003

Personal information
- Native name: Илья Лазаревич Ципурский
- Nationality: Russian
- Born: 26 August 1934
- Died: 3 August 2022 (aged 87)

Sport
- Country: Soviet Union
- Sport: Judo
Medal record
Judo
Representing Soviet Union
European Championships
Silver medal – second place	1964 Berlin	80 kg

Ilya Lazarevich Tsipursky (Russian: Илья Лазаревич Ципурский; 26 August 1934 – 3 August 2022) was a Soviet judoka and sambist. He competed at the 1964 European Judo Championships, winning the silver medal in the amateurs's 80 kg event. He was in the middleweight class.

Tsipursky was considered a champion of the Soviet Union in the martial art sambo in 1956 and 1962. He worked at the Moscow State University of Civil Engineering, where he served as the candidate of engineering and was also the Department of Construction Mechanization professor. He was honored with the Honored Master of Sports of the USSR for his sambo work.

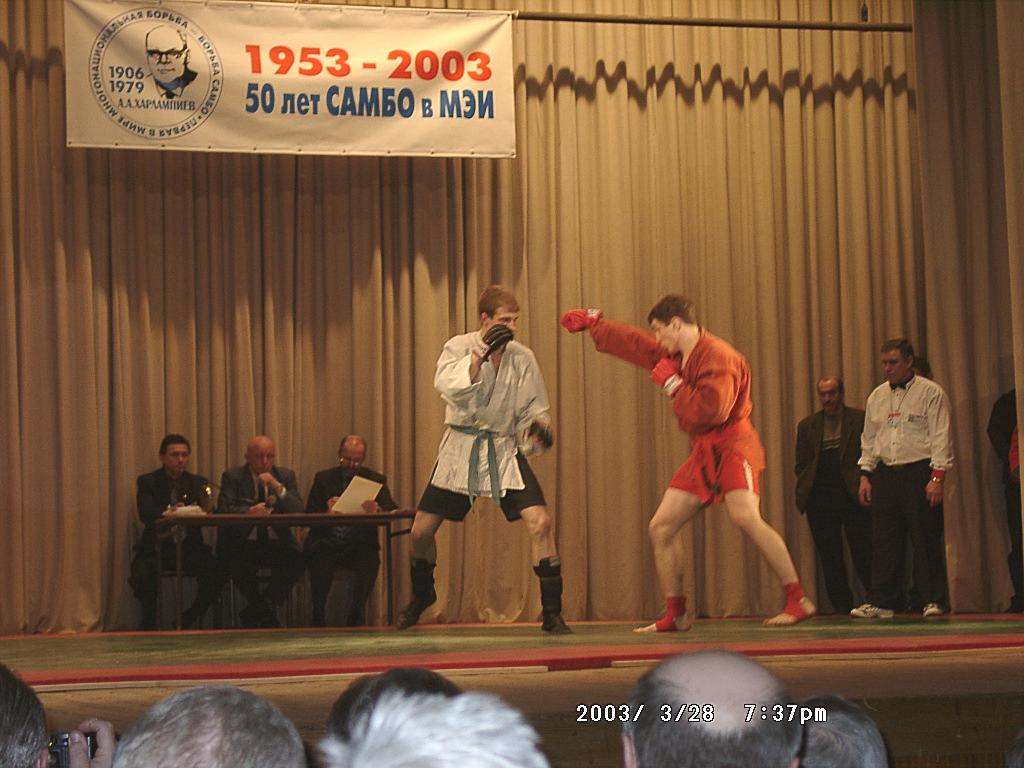
Ilya Tsipursky (in the center — at the table) is the chief judge of the final part of the combat sambo competition at the MEI (2003)

Tsipursky died in August 2022, at the age of 87.
