= Peter Paige (judoka) =

Australian judoka (born 1939)

Personal information
- Nationality: Australian
- Born: 1 March 1939 (age 87)
- Occupation: Judoka

Sport
- Sport: Judo

Peter Paige (born 1 March 1939) is an Australian judoka. He competed in the men's middleweight event at the 1964 Summer Olympics.
