= Nobuyuki Sato (judoka) =

Japanese judoka (born 1944)

Personal information
- Born: 12 January 1944 (age 82) Hakodate, Hokkaido, Japan
- Occupation: Judoka

Sport
- Country: Japan
- Sport: Judo
- Rank: 9th dan black belt

Achievements and titles
- World Champ.: (1967, 1973)
Medal record
Representing Japan
Men's judo
World Championships
Gold medal – first place	1967 Salt Lake City	-93 kg
Bronze medal – third place	1969 Mexico City	Open
Silver medal – second place	1971 Ludwigshafen	-93 kg
Gold medal – first place	1973 Lausanne	-93 kg
Men's sambo
European Championships
Gold medal – first place	1972 Riga	-93 kg

Profile at external databases
- JudoInside.com: 5473

Nobuyuki Sato (佐藤宣践, Satō Nobuyuki; born 12 January 1944) is a Japanese judoka, sambist, Japan national judo coach, author, educator and sports science researcher.

== Biography ==
Nobuyuki Sato was born on January 12, 1944, in Hokkaido, Japan. He was the world judo champion in the -93 kg category in 1967 and 1973. He was the coach of multiple judo Olympic and World champions including Yasuhiro Yamashita, Katsuhiko Kashiwazaki, Hidetoshi Nakanishi, and Kosei Inoue.

In November 2021, he was awarded the Order of the Sacred Treasure.

== Bibliography ==
- Judo: Postwar Judo: Its Glory and Transition (柔道: 戦後柔道その栄光と変遷) (with Toshiaki Hashimoto, 1985), Baseball Magazine Company, ISBN 9784583025117
- Best Judo (with Isao Inokuma, 1987), Kodansha lnternational Ltd, ISBN 978-0-87011-786-2
- Ashiwaza (1991), The Crowood Press Ltd, ISBN 978-1-85223-491-1
- 柔道大事典 (Judo Encyclopedia) (with Yukimitsu Kano, Toshiro Daigo, Teizo Kawamura, Yoshinori Takeuchi, Ryozo Nakamura, 1999), Athens Shobo, ISBN 9784871522052
