= Huang Yong-chun =

Taiwanese judoka

Personal information
- Nationality: Taiwanese
- Born: 1 September 1935 (age 89)
- Occupation: Judoka

Sport
- Sport: Judo

Huang Yong-chun (黃榮椿, Pinyin: Huáng Róng-chūn; born 1 September 1935) is a Taiwanese judoka. He competed in the men's heavyweight event at the 1964 Summer Olympics.
