= Kim Jong-dal =

South Korean judoka

Personal information
- Nationality: South Korean
- Born: 28 May 1946 (age 78)

Sport
- Sport: Judo

Kim Jong-dal (born 28 May 1946) is a South Korean judoka. He competed in the men's heavyweight event at the 1964 Summer Olympics.
