= 1967 World Judo Championships =

Judo competition

Judo 1967 Men's World Judo Championships
- Venue: Gymnasium at the University of Utah
- Location: Salt Lake City, United States
- Dates: 9–11 August 1967
- Competitors: 115 from 25 nations

Competition at external databases
- Links: IJF • JudoInside

The 1967 World Judo Championships were the fifth edition of the men's World Judo Championships, and were held in Salt Lake City, United States from 9–11 August, 1967.

== Medal overview ==
=== Men ===
| Event | Gold | Silver | Bronze |
|---|---|---|---|
| -63 kg | (Japan) Takafumi Shigeoka | (Japan) Hirofumi Matsuda | (South Korea) Kim Byung-Sik (Soviet Union) Sergey Suslin |
| -70 kg | (Japan) Hiroshi Minatoya | (South Korea) Park Kil-Sun | (Japan) Takehide Nakatani (South Korea) Park Chung-Sam |
| -80 kg | (Japan) Eiji Maruki | (Netherlands) Martin Poglajen | (Japan) Shinichi Enshu (United Kingdom) Brian Jacks |
| -93 kg | (Japan) Nobuyuki Sato | (Japan) Osamu Sato | (Netherlands) Ernst Eugster (Germany) Peter Herrmann |
| +93 kg | (Netherlands) Wim Ruska | (Japan) Nobuyuki Maejima | (Soviet Union) Anzor Kiknadze (Japan) Takeshi Matsuzaka |
| Open | (Japan) Mitsuo Matsunaga | (Germany) Klaus Glahn | (Germany) Peter Herrmann (Japan) Masatoshi Shinomaki |

=== Medal table ===
| Rank | Nation | Gold | Silver | Bronze | Total |
|---|---|---|---|---|---|
| 1 | Japan (JPN) | 5 | 3 | 4 | 12 |
| 2 | Netherlands (NED) | 1 | 1 | 1 | 3 |
| 3 | South Korea (KOR) | 0 | 1 | 2 | 3 |
| 3 | West Germany (FRG) | 0 | 1 | 2 | 3 |
| 5 | Soviet Union (URS) | 0 | 0 | 2 | 2 |
| 6 | Great Britain (GBR) | 0 | 0 | 1 | 1 |
| Totals (6 entries) | | 6 | 6 | 12 | 24 |
