= Parnaoz Chikviladze =

Georgian judoka (1941–1966)

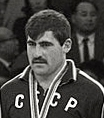
- Parnaoz Chikviladze at the 1964 Olympics

Personal information
- Full name: Parnaoz Lukich Chikviladze
- Born: 14 April 1941 Chabinaani, Kakheti, Georgian SSR, Soviet Union
- Died: 14 June 1966 (aged 25) Moscow, Russian SFSR, Soviet Union
- Occupation: Judoka
- Height: 1.84 m (6 ft 0 in)
- Weight: 104 kg (229 lb)

Sport
- Country: Soviet Union
- Sport: Judo
- Weight class: +80 kg, +93 kg
- Club: Burevestnik Tbilisi

Achievements and titles
- Olympic Games: (bronze) (1964)
- World Champ.: 5th (1965)
- European Champ.: (gold) (1965)
Medal record
Men's judo
Representing Soviet Union
Olympic Games
Bronze medal – third place	1964 Tokyo	+80 kg
European Championships
Gold medal – first place	1965 Madrid	+93 kg
Silver medal – second place	1964 Berlin	ama +80 kg
Silver medal – second place	1965 Madrid	ama +93 kg
Silver medal – second place	1966 Luxembourg	+93 kg

Profile at external databases
- IJF: 54625
- JudoInside.com: 5773
- Updated on 25 June 2023

Parnaoz Lukich Chikviladze (Georgian: ფარნაოზ ჩიკვილაძე, Russian: Парнаоз Лукич Чиквиладзе, 14 April 1941 – 14 June 1966) was a Georgian judoka, who won a bronze medal in the heavyweight division (+80 kg) at the 1964 Summer Olympics. At the European Championships, he won a gold medal in 1965 and silver medals in 1964, 1965 and 1966. In 1964, he also was European champion in the team event. He died in a car accident in Moscow in 1966 and thus never competed in the Soviet judo championships, which were first conducted in 1973.
