= Kanapathy Moorthy =

Malaysian judoka

Personal information
- Nationality: Malaysian
- Born: 23 December 1932; Kuala Lumpur, Malaysia
- Died: 11 August 2010 (aged 77); Singapore, Singapore
- Occupation: Judoka

Sport
- Sport: Judo

Kanapathy Moorthy (23 December 1932 – 11 August 2010) was a Malaysian judoka. He competed in the men's middleweight event at the 1964 Summer Olympics.
