= Salvador Goldschmied =

Mexican judoka (born 1940)

Personal information
- Nationality: Mexican
- Born: 19 October 1940 (age 85)
- Occupation: Judoka

Sport
- Sport: Judo

Profile at external databases
- JudoInside.com: 12868

Salvador Goldschmied (born 19 October 1940) is a Mexican judoka. He competed in the men's heavyweight event at the 1964 Summer Olympics.
