= George Kerr (judoka) =

Scottish judoka

Personal information
- Nationality: Scotland
- Born: 24 August 1937 (age 89)
- Occupation: President of the British Judo Association

Sport
- Country: Great Britain
- Sport: Judo
- Rank: 10th dan black belt
Medal record
Men's Judo
Representing United Kingdom
European Championships
Silver medal – second place	1962 Essen	Open class
Silver medal – second place	1963 Geneva	-80 kg
Silver medal – second place	1967 Rome	-80 kg
Bronze medal – third place	1964 Berlin	-80 kg

Profile at external databases
- JudoInside.com: 4952

George Kerr, CBE (born 24 August 1937) is a Scottish judoka. He is referred to as Mr Judo.

== Judo career ==
In 1957, he won the gold medal in the European Judo Championships in Rotterdam. In 2001 he became president of the British Judo Association. In 2002 he was named one of the inaugural members of the Scottish Sports Hall of Fame.

In 2010 he was awarded the grade 10th Dan by the International Judo Federation (IJF) for international services to judo. Having been preceded by Frenchman Henri Courtine (2007) and followed by Japanese American Yoshihiro Uchida (2014) and Italian Franco Capelletti (2017), Kerr currently is one of only four living IJF jūdan. He is the second Briton after Charles Palmer to have gained this rank in Judo. IJF judo dan rank awards are, however, not officially recognized by the Kodokan Judo Institute in Japan, and currently, Uchida (Kodokan 7th dan, 1983) and Courtine (Kodokan 6th dan, 1968) are the only IJF judan who concomitantly also hold a Kodokan judo rank of 6th dan or higher.

Kerr received an Honorary Doctorate from Heriot-Watt University in 2010

He was appointed Commander of the Order of the British Empire (CBE) in the 2011 New Year Honours.

He also received the Order of the Rising Sun, Gold Rays with Rosette, in January 2011 after being named in Emperor Akihito's November 2010 honours list, due to his ongoing contribution to judo and to relations between the UK and judo's country of origin, Japan. Masataka Tarahara, Japan’s Consul-General in Scotland, presented him in Edinburgh with Japan’s equivalent of a CBE.

== Bibliography ==
He has authored the books Judo:

- basic training manual for beginners (W. Foulsham, 1964)
- Judo as part of the 'Flying Start' series (Hodder Wayland, 1991)
- with his coaching-charge twice Olympic gold-medallist Peter Seisenbacher, Modern Judo: Techniques of East and West (Crowood Press, 1991).
- He has a Autobiography named - My Journey to the 10th Dan.
