= Jim Bregman =

American Olympic judoka

James Bregman
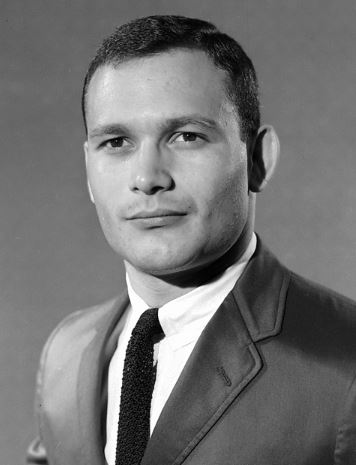
- J. Bregman, '64 Olympic Photo

Personal information
- Full name: James Steven Bregman
- Born: November 17, 1941 (age 84) Arlington, Virginia, U.S.
- Occupation: Judoka
- Height: 170 cm (5 ft 7 in)

Sport
- Country: United States
- Sport: Judo
- Weight class: ‍–‍80 kg
- Rank: 10th dan black belt
- Club: Kodokan Judo Institute, Meiji University Judo Team

Achievements and titles
- Olympic Games: (bronze) (1964)
- World Champ.: (bronze) (1965)
- Pan American Champ.: (1965)
Medal record
Men's judo
Representing United States
Olympic Games
Bronze medal – third place	1964 Tokyo	‍–‍80 kg
World Championships
Bronze medal – third place	1965 Rio de Janeiro	‍–‍80 kg
Pan American Championships
Gold medal – first place	1965 Guatemala	‍–‍80 kg
Maccabiah Games
Gold medal – first place	1965 Maccabiah Games	‍–‍80 kg

Profile at external databases
- IJF: 54578
- JudoInside.com: 5998
- Updated on June 24, 2023

James Steven Bregman (born November 17, 1941, in Arlington, Virginia) was a member of the first American team to compete in judo at the Summer Olympics. A founding member and President of the United States Judo Federation, in his competitive career he was a bronze Olympic medalist (1964), a World Championships bronze medalist (1965), a Pan American Championships gold medalist, and a Maccabiah Games gold medalist (1965).

== Biography ==
Bregman is Jewish. His father had a grocery store in Green Valley, Virginia, and the family lived above it on the second floor. Bregman started Judo at the age of 12 and spent many hours in Judo training at schools first near his Virginia home and then in Japan.

=== Early training ===
Bregman suffered as a child from asthma and bronchitis, and to build endurance tried several indoor sports before recognizing he could succeed at Judo. He was bussed to Fairlington Elementary School and was an honor graduate of Wakefield High School in Arlington, Virginia. From an early age he trained at the Judo Club associated with the Officer's Athletic Club at the Pentagon, and at the Washington Judo Club, winning his Black Belt at 15. After High School, he enrolled as an economics student at Tokyo's Jesuit-run Sophia University. While a student at Sophia, he pursued long hours of Judo training at Tokyo's Kodokan Judo Institute, and later received more advanced training at Meiji and Waseda Universities.

=== Training at Meiji University ===
Like a number of other skilled foreign judoka (judo practitioners) in Japan, Bregman trained with Judo instructors and students who were members of the Judo Team at Tokyo's Meiji University, arguably the world's greatest judo power in the 1960s, and considered today to be one of the most prestigious Universities in Japan. Training at Meiji was difficult and demanding, but Bregman trained, learned, and was able to gain sufficient skill to earn the respect of his fellow students at Meiji. One of Bregman's most influential teachers was his sempai, a judo instructor named Seki who was a year ahead of him. Bregman was believed to have trained nearly every day with Seki, who many considered the third or fourth best in the middleweight class in Japan, and served as Captain of Meiji's Judo Team. The experience may have been the singularly most important factor that enabled Bregman to medal in a sport where three of the four weight class golds were taken by Japanese Olympians in 1964. Bregman learned the right way to stand, mat work, and choke techniques, and he learned mat presence. Each of these skills served him well in Olympic competition.

In 1964 he won the AAU Senior National Judo Championship.

=== Bronze Olympic medal ===
Judo was first included in the 1964 Summer Olympics in Tokyo, and Bregman won a bronze medal in the under 80 kg category in those games—the only American to bring home a medal in judo in the 1964 Summer Games.

The judo world sometimes speaks with pride of the 1964 US Olympic Judo Team as consisting of an American Jew, an African-American, a Japanese-American, and a Native American (see Nishioka's book in the references, below).

=== Pan-American Championships, and Maccabiah Games ===
In 1965 he won a gold medal at the Pan American Championships in the 176 pound division. He also won a gold medal in the 1965 Maccabiah Games in Israel.

Breaking another glass ceiling in 1965, Bregman became the first American to win a medal in the World Championships held in São Paulo, Brazil after taking a Bronze.

Knee surgery in 1966 ended Bregman's competitive career.

In 1967, he and Ken Busch opened the Olympic Judo Club in Washington D. C., looking to alleviate the lack of qualified Judo Instructors in the United States. Throughout his life, Bregman would work to improve opportunities for young Americans to train in Judo and labor to improve the methods though which Americans could produce champions in the sport, but he often found the American system lacking.

=== US Judo Association President ===
Bregman has continued to be involved in the American judo community, and served three times as President of the United States Judo Association, the organization which he helped found in 1968.

=== Honors ===
In January 2018, Bregman was promoted to the highest judo rank of Judan (10th Degree Black Belt) by the United States Judo Association. He is also an athlete inductee of the USA Judo Hall of Fame.

== See also ==
- List of select Jewish judokas
- Ben Nighthorse Campbell (1964 teammate)
- George Harris (1964 teammate)
- Paul Maruyama (1964 teammate)
- Yosh Uchida (Olympic team coach)
