= Poglajen =

Poglajen is a surname. Notable people with the surname include:

- Cristian Poglajen (born 1989), Argentine volleyball player
- Martin Poglajen (born 1942), Dutch judoka
