= Michel Casella =

Argentine judoka

Personal information
- Full name: Michel Angel Casella
- Nationality: Argentine
- Born: 15 February 1940 (age 85)
- Occupation: Judoka

Sport
- Sport: Judo

Michel Angel Casella otherwise Miguel Casella (born 15 February 1940) is an Argentine judoka. He competed in the men's heavyweight event at the 1964 Summer Olympics.
