= Huang Chin-chun =

Taiwanese judoka

Personal information
- Nationality: Taiwanese
- Born: 5 February 1940 (age 85)

Sport
- Sport: Judo

Huang Chin-chun (黃金椿, Pinyin: Huáng Jīn-chūn; born 5 February 1940) is a Taiwanese judoka. He competed in the men's middleweight event at the 1964 Summer Olympics.
