= Günter Wiesner =

German judoka

Medal record

Men's judo

European Championships
Bronze medal – third place	1964 Berlin	Team
Bronze medal – third place	1965 Madrid	Team
Bronze medal – third place	1966 Luxembourg	Team

Günter Wiesner is a German Judo athlete who competed for the SC Dynamo Berlin / Sportvereinigung (SV) Dynamo. He has won medals at international competitions.
