= Wolfgang Hofmann =

West German judoka (1941–2020)

Personal information
- Born: 30 March 1941 Cologne, Nordrhein-Westfalen, Nazi Germany
- Died: 12 March 2020 (aged 78) Cologne, North Rhine-Westphalia, Germany
- Occupation: Judoka
- Height: 177 cm (5 ft 10 in)

Sport
- Country: West Germany
- Sport: Judo
- Weight class: ‍–‍80 kg
- Rank: 8th dan black belt

Achievements and titles
- Olympic Games: (silver) (1964)
- World Champ.: 7th (1969)
- European Champ.: (gold) (1965, 1968)
Medal record
Men's judo
Representing West Germany
Olympic Games
| Silver medal – second place | 1964 Tokyo | ‍–‍80 kg |
European Championships
| Gold medal – first place | 1965 Madrid | ama ‍–‍80 kg |
| Gold medal – first place | 1968 Lausanne | ‍–‍80 kg |

Profile at external databases
- IJF: 54581
- JudoInside.com: 4822
- Updated on 24 June 2023

Wolfgang Hofmann (30 March 1941 – 12 March 2020) was a West German judoka who competed in the 1964 Summer Olympics in Tokyo, where he won the silver medal in the middleweight class representing the United Team of Germany.

Hofmann was German champion 15 times and European champion twice (1965 and 1968. He was the holder of the 8th Dan, as well as being a lecturer for judo at the German Sport University in Cologne for many years. He further developed his skills during two language and study visits to Japan. He shaped the training and examination regulations of the German Judo Association (DJB).

Hofmann published together with the Japanese Mahito Ohgo a standard book about judo, Judo - Basics of Tachi- Waza and Ne-Waza, in the early 1970s, writing in the foreword:

"Above all, judo means: practicing on the mat, moving, fighting with many partners, or, as the Japanese say, understanding with the body".

Hofmann died on 12 March 2020 about two weeks shy of his 79th birthday.

== Publications ==
- Wolfgang Hofmann: Judo – Grundlagen des Stand- und Bodenkampfes Falken Verlag, 1978, ISBN 3-8068-4013-X
