= Chang Chung-huei =

Taiwanese judoka

Personal information
- Full name: 張 聰輝, Pinyin: Zhāng Cōng-huī
- Nationality: Taiwanese
- Born: 15 July 1936 (age 88)
- Occupation: Judoka

Sport
- Sport: Judo

Chang Chung-huei (born 15 July 1936) is a Taiwanese judoka. He competed in the men's heavyweight event at the 1964 Summer Olympics.
