= Jorge Lugo =

Venezuelan judoka

Personal information
- Nationality: Venezuelan
- Born: 5 April 1938
- Died: 6 October 2022 (aged 84)
- Occupation: Judoka

Sport
- Sport: Judo

Jorge Lugo (5 April 1938 – 6 October 2022) was a Venezuelan judoka. He competed in the men's middleweight event at the 1964 Summer Olympics.
