= Mitsuo Matsunaga =

Japanese judoka

Personal information
- Nationality: Japanese
- Born: February 8, 1939
- Died: May 26, 2009 (aged 70)
- Occupation: Police Officer

Sport
- Sport: Judo

Profile at external databases
- JudoInside.com: 5423

Mitsuo Matsunaga, (February 8, 1939-2009) was a Japanese judoka and former 1965 All-Japan judo champion. In addition to this Matsunaga was a silver medallist at the 1965 World Judo Championships. Eventually becoming a gold medallist at the 1967 World Judo Championships.
