= Vladimir Kuspish =

Soviet Union judoka

Personal information
- Nationality: Soviet Union → Russia
- Born: 1942 (age 83–84)

Sport
- Sport: Judo
- Event: European Judo Championships
Medal record
European Judo Championships
Gold medal – first place	Madrid 1965	U70kg

Vladimir Kuspish (born 1942) was a Soviet Union judoka. He was the champion in judo U70kg at the 1965 European Judo Championships.
