= Margarete Selling =

East German rower

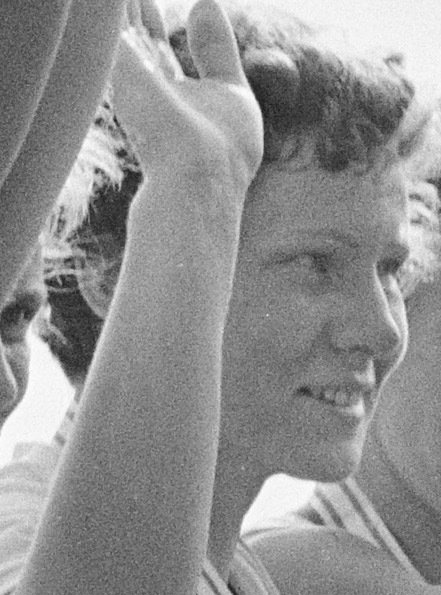
- Selling at the 1966 European Championships

Sport
- Sport: Rowing
- Club: SG Dynamo Potsdam
Medal record
Women's rowing
Representing East Germany
European Rowing Championships
Gold medal – first place	1966 Amsterdam	Eight

Margarete Selling is a retired East German rower who won the 1966 European Championships in the eight event. She married the judoka Herbert Niemann (1935–1991).
