= Willem Dadema =

Dutch judoka

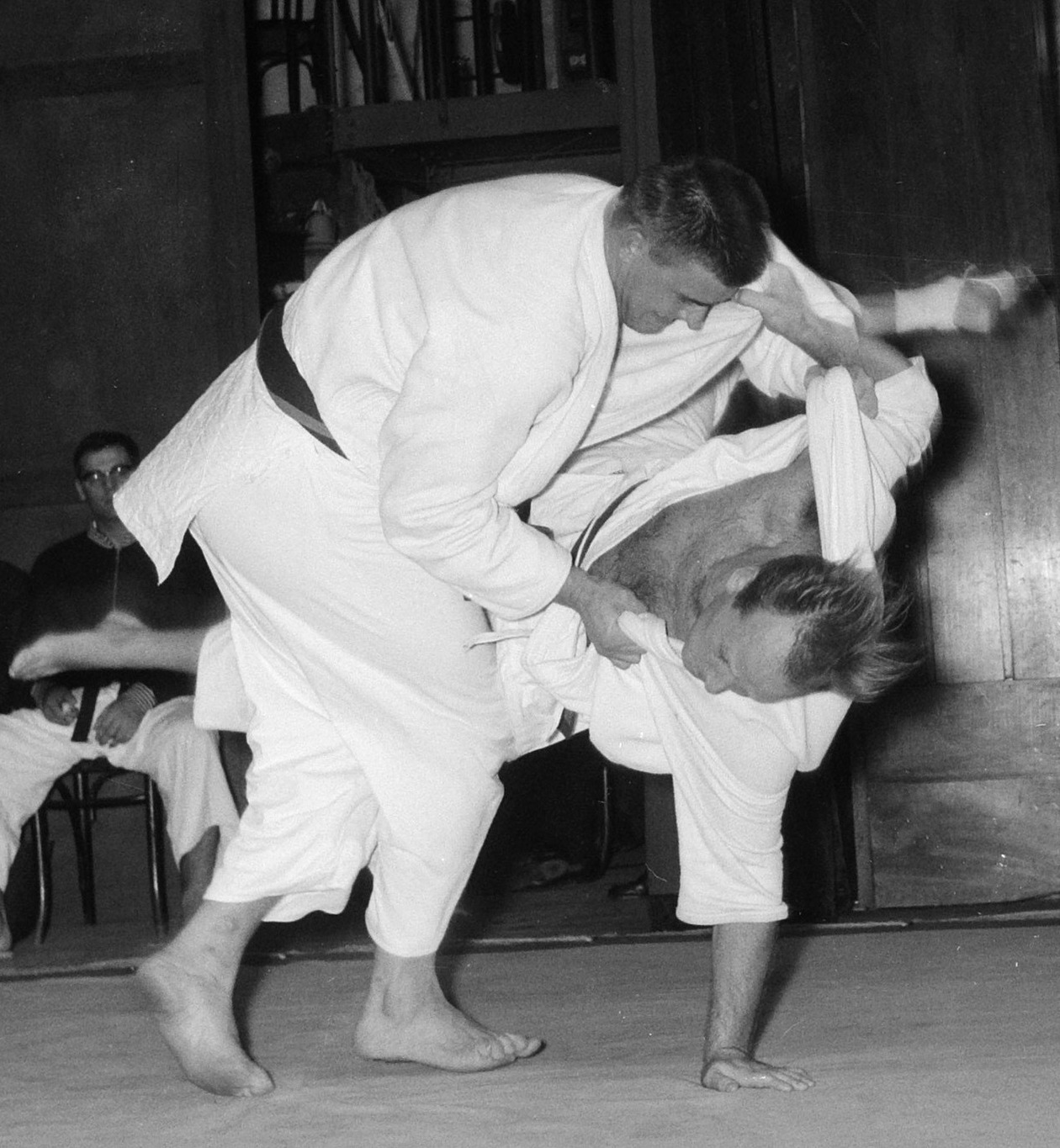
- Willem Dadema (right) vs. Anton Geesink in 1961

Personal information
- Born: 24 August 1933 (age 92)

Sport
- Country: Netherlands
- Sport: Judo
Medal record
Representing The Netherlands
European Championships
| Silver medal – second place | 1961 Milan | 3rd dan |
| Silver medal – second place | 1962 Essen | +80 kg |
| Silver medal – second place | 1963 Geneva | +80 kg |
| Bronze medal – third place | 1955 Paris | 1st dan |

Willem "Wil" Dadema (born 1933) is a retired heavyweight judoka from the Netherlands. Between 1955 and 1963 he won four medals at European championships. He was a national champion in 1960 and 1961.
