= Lê Bả Thành =

Vietnamese judoka

Lê Bá Thanh
Personal information
- Born: October 12, 1934 (age 91) Vietnam
- Occupation: Judoka

Sport
- Sport: Judo

Profile at external databases
- JudoInside.com: 12864

Lê Bá Thanh (born October 12, 1934) was an Olympic judoka for the Republic of South Vietnam. He competed in the middleweight division. He was listed in Black Belt Magazine as a competitor at the 1964 Olympic Games. In that particular Olympics, he would lose to PHi-Tae Kim and Chin-Chun Huang.
