= Bernardo Repuyan =

Filipino judoka

Personal information
- Nationality: Filipino
- Born: April 2, 1928
- Died: November 14, 2009 (aged 81) Fairfax, Virginia, U.S.
- Occupation: Judoka
- Height: 5 ft 7 in (170 cm)
- Weight: 161 lb (73 kg)

Sport
- Sport: Judo

Bernardo Rebancos Repuyan (April 2, 1928 – November 14, 2009) was a Filipino judoka. He competed in the men's middleweight event at the 1964 Summer Olympics.
