= Hiroshi Minatoya =

Japanese judoka

Medal record

Representing Japan

Men's Judo

World Championships
| Gold medal – first place | 1967 Salt Lake City | -70 kg |
| Gold medal – first place | 1969 Mexico City | -70 kg |
| Silver medal – second place | 1965 Rio de Janeiro | -68 kg |
| Silver medal – second place | 1971 Ludwigshafen | -70 kg |

Hiroshi Minatoya (湊谷 弘, Minatoya Hiroshi, October 17, 1943 – June 15, 2016) was a Japanese judoka.

He was born in Fukuno, Toyama and began judo at the age of 5.

After graduating from Tenri University, Minatoya coached judo at the dojo wichi Anton Geesink managed in Netherlands.

In 1969, Minatoya participated in the World Championships in Mexico City and won a gold medal, defending his world championship.

Minatoya retired in 1972, when he was defeated by Toyokazu Nomura at the All-Japan Selected Judo Championships and missed the participation of the Olympic Games held in Munich.

From 1967 to 2009, he also coached judo at Kanazawa Institute of Technology in Kanazawa, Ishikawa.

== Achievements ==
- 1965 - World Championships (-68 kg) 2nd
- 1967 - World Championships (-70 kg) 1st
- 1968 - All-Japan Selected Championships (Half-Lightweight) 3rd
- 1969 - World Championships (-70 kg) 1st

- All-Japan Championships (Openweight only) loss
- All-Japan Selected Championships (Lightweight) 1st

- 1970 - All-Japan Selected Championships (Lightweight) 1st

- All-Japan Championships (Openweight only) loss

- 1971 - World Championships (-70 kg) 2nd

- All-Japan Selected Championships (Lightweight) 3rd

- 1972 - All-Japan Selected Championships (Lightweight) 2nd
