= Pipat Singsanee =

Thai judoka

Personal information
- Nationality: Thai
- Born: 13 December 1939 (age 85)
- Occupation: Judoka

Sport
- Sport: Judo

Pipat Singsanee (born 13 December 1939) is a Thai judoka. He competed in the men's middleweight event at the 1964 Summer Olympics.
