= 1965 World Judo Championships =

Judo competition

Judo 1965 Men's World Judo Championships
- Venue: Rio de Janeiro
- Location: Rio de Janeiro, Brazil
- Dates: 14-17 October 1965
- Competitors: 150 from 42 nations

Competition at external databases
- Links: IJF • JudoInside

The 1965 World Judo Championships were the fourth edition of the men's World Judo Championships, and were held in Rio de Janeiro, Brazil from October 14–17, 1965.

== Medal overview ==
=== Men ===
Event	Gold	Silver	Bronze
-68 kg	(Japan) Hirofumi Matsuda	(Japan) Hiroshi Minatoya	(South Korea) Park Keil-Soon (Soviet Union) Oleg Stepanov
-80 kg	(Japan) Isao Okano	(Japan) Kenichi Yamanaka	(United States) James Bregman (South Korea) Kim Eui-Tae
+80 kg	(Netherlands) Anton Geesink	(Japan) Mitsuo Matsunaga	(Canada) Doug Rogers (Japan) Seiji Sakaguchi
Open	(Japan) Isao Inokuma	(Soviet Union) Anzor Kibrotsashvili	(Soviet Union) Anzor Kiknadze (Netherlands) Peter Snijders

=== Medal table ===
Rank	Nation	Gold	Silver	Bronze	Total
1	Japan (JPN)	3	3	1	7
2	Netherlands (NED)	1	0	1	2
3	Soviet Union (URS)	0	1	2	3
4	South Korea (KOR)	0	0	2	2
5	Canada (CAN)	0	0	1	1
5	United States (USA)	0	0	1	1
Totals (6 entries)		4	4	8	16
