= Isao Okano =

Japanese judoka (born 1944)

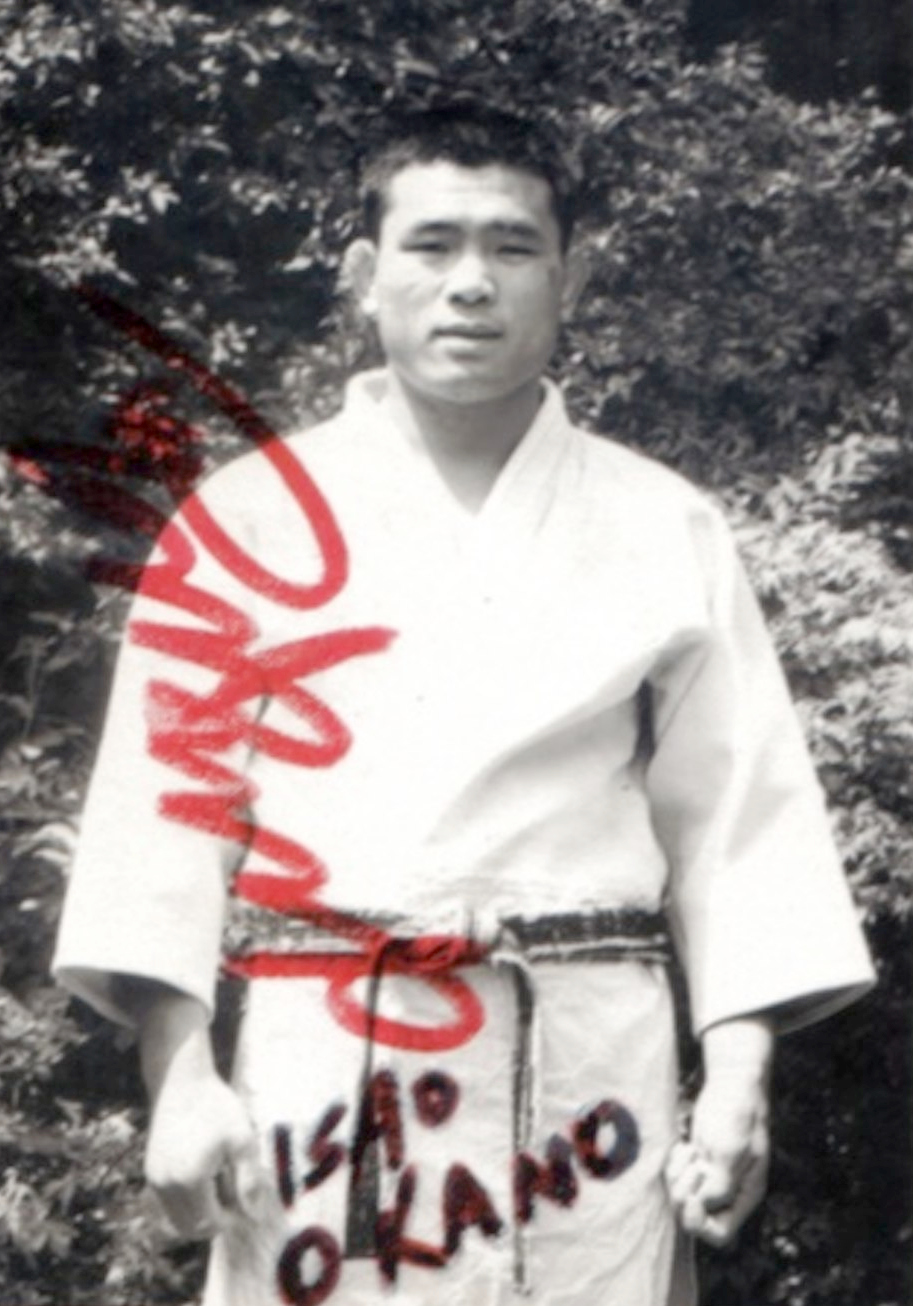

Personal information
- Born: 22 January 1944 (age 82) Ryūgasaki, Ibaraki, Japan
- Occupation: Judoka
- Height: 1.71 m (5 ft 7 in)

Sport
- Country: Japan
- Sport: Judo
- Weight class: ‍–‍80 kg

Achievements and titles
- Olympic Games: (gold) (1964)
- World Champ.: (1965)
Medal record
Men's judo
Representing Japan
Olympic Games
| Gold medal – first place | 1964 Tokyo | ‍–‍80 kg |
World Championships
| Gold medal – first place | 1965 Rio de Janeiro | ‍–‍80 kg |

Profile at external databases
- IJF: 54596
- JudoInside.com: 5455
- Updated on 24 June 2023

Isao Okano (岡野 功, Okano Isao; born 20 January 1944) is a retired judoka who competed in the middleweight division (‍–‍80 kg) in the 1964 Summer Olympics.

== Biography ==
Okano entered the 1964 Summer Olympics while studying at Chuo University's law school, and won the gold medal in the middleweight division. He won another gold medal at the World Judo Championships in 1965, becoming the champion of his division at only 21 years of age. He also won the open-weight class division of the All-Japan Judo Championships in 1967 and 1969, and placed second in 1968. At 80 kg, he and Shinobu Sekine remain the lightest ever competitors to win these championships. Okano suddenly retired from competitive judo at only 25 years of age, and founded the Sekijuku (currently the Ryutsu Keizai University's judo team) in 1970, where he instructed future Olympic gold medalist Kazuhiro Ninomiya. He also served as a coach for the Japanese team during the 1976 Summer Olympics. He later worked as a judo instructor at Keio University from 1989 to 1998, and the University of Tokyo from 1989 to 2000. He is a retired professor and Head of the Judo Department at Ryutsu Keizai University. He has held the judo rank of 6th dan for more than 40 years. Isao Okano is the author of Vital Judo, which was published in 1976. Okano is famously known for his seoinage, kouchi gari and osoto gari.

Also known as a master in the field of newaza, Okano is considered by some an important contributor to the late art of Brazilian jiu-jitsu. He was a teacher to Brazilian jiu-jitsu black belts like Joe Moreira, Fredson Paixao, Edson Carvalho and Oswaldo Alves, with the last citing their training with Okano as instrumental for the development of sweeps, side control and guard work in modern jiu-jitsu.

== See also ==
- List of judoka
- List of Olympic medalists in judo
