= José da Costa (volleyball) =

Brazilian volleyball player (born 1941)

José Maria Schwartz da Costa (10 January 1941 – 29 November 2012) was a Brazilian volleyball player who competed in the 1964 Summer Olympics and in the 1968 Summer Olympics.
