= Mauri Fonseca =

Brazilian swimmer

Personal information
- Full name: Mauri Fernandes Fonseca
- Born: 12 September 1941 (age 84) Porto Alegre, Rio Grande do Sul, Brazil

Sport
- Sport: Swimming
- Strokes: Freestyle, Butterfly

Mauri Fernandes Fonseca (born 12 September 1941 in Porto Alegre) is a former international freestyle and butterfly swimmer from Brazil.

At the 1964 Summer Olympics, in Tokyo, he swam the 100-metre freestyle and the 4×100-metre medley, not reaching the finals. A month before the trip to Japan, Fonseca began his fitness in Forte da Urca in Rio de Janeiro. He slept in barracks with the soldiers, there was no food with balanced diet, and even had a technician accompanying his training. In the same place, was the Brazil national football team. In the hours that did not train for the Olympics, he played as a left-winger of Brazil team. Just was not part of the team, then an amateur team, by being committed to swimming.

In his career, he was Brazilian and South American champion.. He was the first champion of the Brazil Trophy in the 100-metre butterfly. Later, he became professor of swimming in Porto Alegre. He also trained Sérgio Pinto Ribeiro, who participated in the 1976 Olympics in Montreal and 1980 in Moscow.
