= Rodolfo Pérez (judoka) =

Argentine judoka (born 1945)

Personal information
- Nationality: Argentine
- Born: 6 January 1945 (age 80)
- Occupation: Judoka

Sport
- Sport: Judo

Profile at external databases
- JudoInside.com: 9959

Rodolfo Pérez (born 6 January 1945) is an Argentine judoka. He competed in the men's middleweight event at the 1964 Summer Olympics.
