= Hamilton de Oliveira =

Brazilian volleyball player (1934–2015)

Hamilton Leão de Oliveira (20 May 1934 – 23 December 2015) was a Brazilian volleyball player who competed in the 1964 Summer Olympics.
