= Helmut Howiller =

German judoka (1943–2024)

Personal information
- Nationality: German
- Born: 27 July 1943 Dieterswald, Reichsgau Wartheland, Germany (now Dzietrzkowice, Poland)
- Died: 3 May 2024 (aged 80)
- Occupation: Judoka

Sport
- Sport: Judo
Medal record
Men's judo
Representing East Germany
European Championships
Bronze medal – third place	1963 Switzerland	Pro. – 80+ kg
Bronze medal – third place	1964 East Germany	Am. – Open class
Silver medal – second place	1968 Switzerland	93 kg
Gold medal – first place	1971 Sweden	93 kg

Profile at external databases
- JudoInside.com: 5595

Helmut Howiller (27 June 1943 – 3 May 2024) was a German judoka. He competed in the men's half-heavyweight event at the 1972 Summer Olympics. Howiller died on 3 May 2024, aged 80.
