= Kim Eui-tae =

South Korean judoka (born 1941)

Personal information
- Born: 2 June 1941 (age 85)
- Occupation: Judoka

Sport
- Country: South Korea
- Sport: Judo
- Weight class: ‍–‍80 kg, ‍–‍93 kg, Open

Achievements and titles
- Olympic Games: (bronze) (1964)
- World Champ.: (bronze) (1965)
Medal record
Men's judo
Representing South Korea
Olympic Games
| Bronze medal – third place | 1964 Tokyo | ‍–‍80 kg |
World Championships
| Bronze medal – third place | 1965 Rio de Janeiro | ‍–‍80 kg |

Profile at external databases
- IJF: 54590
- JudoInside.com: 6091
- Updated on 24 June 2023

Kim Eui-Tae (Korean: 김의태, born 2 June 1941) is a South Korean former judoka who competed in the 1964 Summer Olympics (‍–‍80 kg) and in the 1972 Summer Olympics (‍–‍93 kg and open category).
