= Narzal García =

Filipino judoka

Personal information
- Nationality: Filipino
- Born: July 13, 1946
- Died: April 25, 2017 (aged 70) Davao City, Philippines
- Occupation: Judoka
- Height: 5 ft 8 in (173 cm)
- Weight: 161 lb (73 kg)

Sport
- Sport: Judo

Narzal García (July 13, 1946 – April 25, 2017) was a Filipino judoka. He competed in the men's middleweight event at the 1964 Summer Olympics.
