= Alfred Redl (judoka) =

Austrian judoka

Personal information
- Nationality: Austrian
- Born: 10 August 1940 (age 86)
- Occupation: Judoka
- Height: 179 cm (5 ft 10 in)
- Weight: 79 kg (174 lb)

Sport
- Sport: Judo

Profile at external databases
- IJF: 54588
- JudoInside.com: 12860

Alfred Redl (born 10 August 1940) is an Austrian judoka. He competed in the men's middleweight event at the 1964 Summer Olympics.
