= Ārons Bogoļubovs =

Latvian judoka (born 1938)

Personal information
- Born: 30 December 1938 (age 87)
- Occupation: Judoka

Sport
- Country: Soviet Union
- Sport: Judo
- Weight class: ‍–‍68 kg, ‍–‍70 kg

Achievements and titles
- Olympic Games: (bronze) (1964)
- European Champ.: (gold) (1963, 1964)
Medal record
Men's judo
Representing Soviet Union
Olympic Games
Bronze medal – third place	1964 Tokyo	‍–‍68 kg
European Championships
Gold medal – first place	1963 Genève	‍–‍68 kg
Gold medal – first place	1964 Berlin	‍–‍68 kg
Bronze medal – third place	1966 Luxembourg	‍–‍70 kg

Profile at external databases
- IJF: 54629
- JudoInside.com: 5767
- Updated on 24 June 2023

Ārons Bogoļubovs (Aron Gershevich Bogolyubov, Russian: Арон Гершевич Боголюбов; born 30 December 1938) was a Latvian judoka who competed for the Soviet Union at the 1964 Summer Olympics, where he won a bronze medal in judo in the lightweight class. He is Jewish.

== See also ==
- List of select Jewish judokas
