= Joop Gouweleeuw =

Dutch judoka (1940–2017)

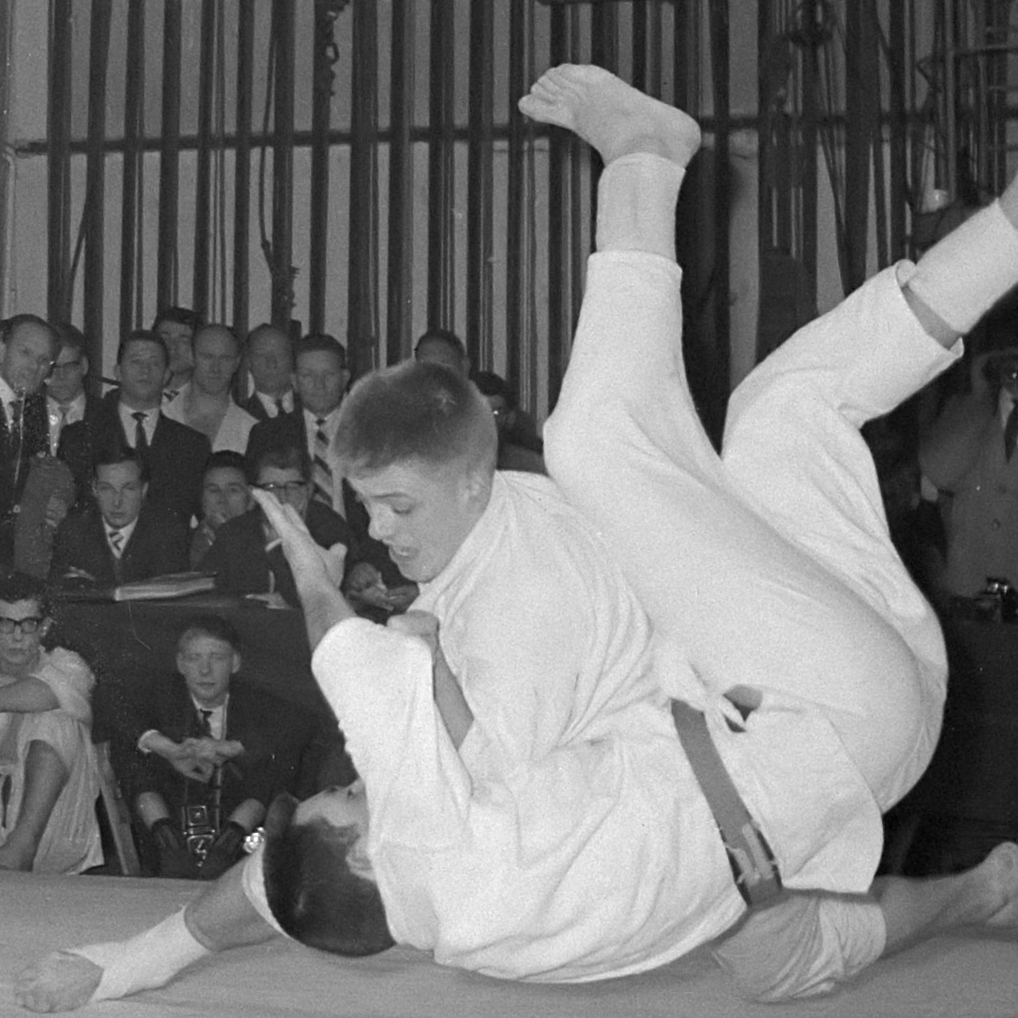
- Gouweleeuw in January 1961

Personal information
- Born: 5 September 1940
- Died: 29 January 2017 (aged 76)
- Occupation: Judoka

Sport
- Sport: Judo

Profile at external databases
- JudoInside.com: 4116

Job Johannes "Joop" Gouweleeuw (5 September 1940 – 29 January 2017) was a Dutch judoka. He competed in 93 kg event at the 1965 and 1966 European Judo Championships, winning a silver and gold medal, respectively. He also competed at the 1964 Summer Olympics in Tokyo. He was born in Delft, South Holland.

Gouweleeuw died on 29 January 2017 in Delft, at the age of 76.

== Achievements ==
Year	Tournament	Place	Weight class
1965	European Judo Championships	2nd	93 kg
1966	European Judo Championships	1st	93 kg
