= Hirofumi Matsuda =

Japanese judoka

Medal record

Men's Judo

Representing Japan

World Championships
| Gold medal – first place | 1965 Rio de Janeiro | -68 kg |
| Silver medal – second place | 1967 Salt Lake City | -63 kg |

Hirofumi Matsuda (松田 博文, Matsuda Hirofumi) is a Japanese judoka and world champion. Born in Fukuoka, Hirofumi is a graduate of Kansai University. He received a gold medal in the lightweight class at the 1965 World Judo Championships in Rio de Janeiro, and a silver medal at the 1967 World Judo Championships in Salt Lake City.
