= Karl Nitz =

East German judoka (1932–2020)

Personal information
- Born: 16 October 1932
- Died: September 2020 (aged 87)
- Occupation: Judoka

Sport
- Sport: Judo
- Weight class: Open
- Rank: 4th dan black belt
Medal record
Men's judo
Representing East Germany
European Championships
Gold medal – first place	1963 Geneva	all categories

Profile at external databases
- IJF: 57150
- JudoInside.com: 5616

Karl Nitz (16 October 1932 - September 2020) was born in Człuchów, Eastern Pomerania, and a famous German judo athlete, who competed for the SC Dynamo Hoppegarten / Sportvereinigung (SV) Dynamo. He won a gold medal and two bronze medals at European Judo Championships and four national titles. He lived until his death in Berlin
