= Karl Reisinger =

Austrian judoka

Personal information
- Nationality: Austrian
- Born: 8 April 1936
- Died: 24 October 2009 (aged 73)
- Occupation: Judoka
- Height: 167 cm (5 ft 6 in)
- Weight: 68 kg (150 lb)

Sport
- Sport: Judo
- Club: ASKÖ Graz

Profile at external databases
- JudoInside.com: 5685

Karl Reisinger (8 April 1936 – 24 October 2009) was an Austrian judoka. He competed in the men's lightweight event at the 1964 Summer Olympics.
