= Rafael Barquero =

Costa Rican judoka (1934–2012)

Personal information
- Born: 27 June 1934; San José, Costa Rica
- Died: 1 February 2012 (aged 77); San José, Costa Rica
- Occupation: Judoka

Sport
- Sport: Judo

Rafael Manuel de Jesús Barquero Chaves (27 June 1934 – 1 February 2012) was a Costa Rican judoka. He competed in the men's middleweight event at the 1964 Summer Olympics. Barquero died in San José on 1 February 2012, at the age of 77.
