= Genrikh Shults =

Russian judoka

Personal information
- Born: 1929
- Died: 1999 (aged 69–70)
Medal record
Men's Judo
European Team Championships
Bronze medal – third place	1962 Essen	U80
Gold medal – first place	1963 Geneva	O80 ama
Men's Sambo
USSR Championships
Gold medal – first place	1955 Riga	U85
Gold medal – first place	1956 Leningrad	U85
Gold medal – first place	1958 Minsk	U85
Gold medal – first place	1959 Moscow	U85
Gold medal – first place	1960 Kyiv	U85
Gold medal – first place	1961 Tbilisi	U85
Silver medal – second place	1962 Kishinev	U85

Genrikh Karlovich Shults (Russian: Генрих Карлович Шульц; Schultz — correct transcription; there are most publications with spelling Shults or Shultz (March 23, 1929 – 1999)) was a Russian judoka and Sambo practitioner who competed for the Soviet Union.

Genrikh Shults was 6-times Champion of the Soviet Union in Sambo (1955, 1956, 1958, 1959, 1960, 1961).

Shults was also a capitan of the first Soviet National Judo team.

In 1962 he won the bronze medal in European Judo Team Championships (Essen) in class O80, and in 1963 he won the gold medal in the European Judo Team Championships (Geneva) in U80 class.

In 1956 Shults found a Sambo club in Moscow High Technical School.

Genrikh Shults among with Oleg Stepanov (U68), Vladimir Pankratov (U80) and Durmishkhan Beruashvili (O80) took part in the pre-Olympics Soviet-Japanese Judo tournament in Japan (1963).

After finishing his sport career Genrikh Shults returned to teach Sambo in Moscow High Technical School for more than 40 years. He trained several European-class Sambo players and judokas.

In 1999 Genrikh Shults died in Moscow at age 70.

Every year, at 23 of March (in Shults's Birthday), an All-Russian Sambo Competition in Memory of Genrikh Shults takes place in Moscow.

Sport club "Sambo-Judo" in Bauman Moscow State Technical University was named after Genrikh Shults.
