= Otto Smirat =

German judoka

Medal record

Men's judo

European Championships
Bronze medal – third place	1964 Berlin	Team
Bronze medal – third place	1965 Madrid	Team
Bronze medal – third place	1966 Luxembourg	Team

Otto Smirat is a German judo athlete, who competed for the SC Dynamo Berlin / Sportvereinigung (SV) Dynamo. He won medals at international competitions.
