= Oleg Stepanov =

Russian judoka (1939–2010)

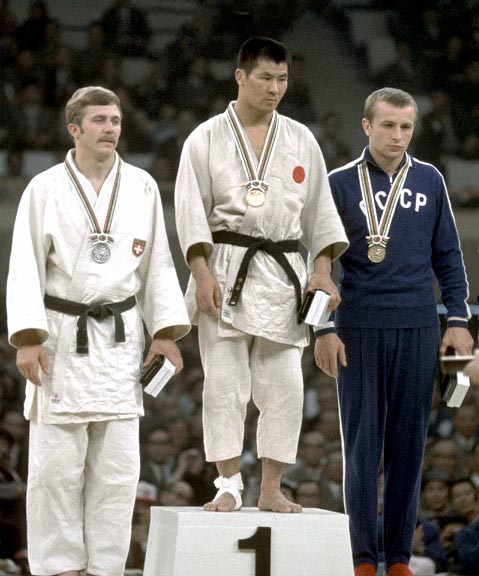
- Stepanov (right) at the 1964 Olympics

Personal information
- Full name: Oleg Sergeyevich Stepanov
- Born: 10 December 1939 Moscow, Russian SFSR, Soviet Union
- Died: 27 February 2010 (aged 70) Moscow, Russia
- Occupation: Judoka
- Height: 1.75 m (5 ft 9 in)

Sport
- Country: Soviet Union
- Sport: Judo, sambo
- Weight class: ‍–‍68 kg, ‍–‍70 kg
- Club: Armed Forces sports society, Moscow

Achievements and titles
- Olympic Games: (bronze) (1964)
- World Champ.: (bronze) (1965)
- European Champ.: (gold) (1965, 1966)
Medal record
Men's judo
Representing Soviet Union
Olympic Games
| Bronze medal – third place | 1964 Tokyo | ‍–‍68 kg |
World Championships
| Bronze medal – third place | 1965 Rio de Janeiro | ‍–‍68 kg |
European Championships
| Gold medal – first place | 1965 Madrid | ama ‍–‍63 kg |
| Gold medal – first place | 1966 Luxembourg | ‍–‍70 kg |

Profile at external databases
- IJF: 54609
- JudoInside.com: 5900
- Updated on 24 June 2023

Oleg Sergeyevich Stepanov (Russian: Олег Серге́евич Степанов; 10 December 1939 – 27 February 2010) was a judoka and sambo competitor. Domestically he was mostly known for sambo, which was a very popular sport in the Soviet Union, albeit with a limited international recognition. Between 1958 and 1968 Stepanov won eight national titles in sambo. Internationally he competed in judo, which has similar rules to sambo. The first Soviet judo team was formed in 1962 from the best sambo competitors, including Stepanov, and in 1963 it showed its strength in Europe and Japan. Later Stepanov won bronze medals at the 1964 Olympics and 1965 World Championships, as well as European titles in 1965 and 1966.

After retiring from competitions, Stepanov coached sambo and judo at the Moscow Armed Forces Sports Club, for which he competed previously. In the late 1970s he trained the national women's judo team.
