= Judo at the 1964 Summer Olympics =

Coordinates: 35.6933°N 139.7500°E

Judo Judo at the Games of the XVIII Olympiad
- Venue: Nippon Budokan
- Location: Tokyo, Japan
- Dates: 20–23 October 1964
- Competitors: 72 from 27 nations

Competition at external databases
- Links: IJF • JudoInside

The judo competition at the 1964 Summer Olympics was the first time the sport was included in the Summer Olympic Games. As a result, decades of judo being officially banned as an "imperialist sport" in the Soviet Union ended shortly before the Games started, as Soviet authorities prioritized winning medals above all else. The medals were awarded in 4 classes, and competition was restricted to men only. The competition was held in the Nippon Budokan, which was built to host the competition.

== Medal summary ==
Games	Gold	Silver	Bronze
Lightweight; 68 kg	Takehide Nakatani; Japan	Eric Hänni; Switzerland	Ārons Bogoļubovs; Soviet Union
Lightweight; 68 kg	Takehide Nakatani; Japan	Eric Hänni; Switzerland	Oleg Stepanov; Soviet Union
Middleweight; 80 kg	Isao Okano; Japan	Wolfgang Hofmann; United Team of Germany	James Bregman; United States
Middleweight; 80 kg	Isao Okano; Japan	Wolfgang Hofmann; United Team of Germany	Kim Eui-tae; South Korea
Heavyweight +80 kg	Isao Inokuma; Japan	Doug Rogers; Canada	Parnaoz Chikviladze; Soviet Union
Heavyweight +80 kg	Isao Inokuma; Japan	Doug Rogers; Canada	Anzor Kiknadze; Soviet Union
Open category	Anton Geesink; Netherlands	Akio Kaminaga; Japan	Theodore Boronovskis; Australia
Open category	Anton Geesink; Netherlands	Akio Kaminaga; Japan	Klaus Glahn; United Team of Germany

== Participating nations ==
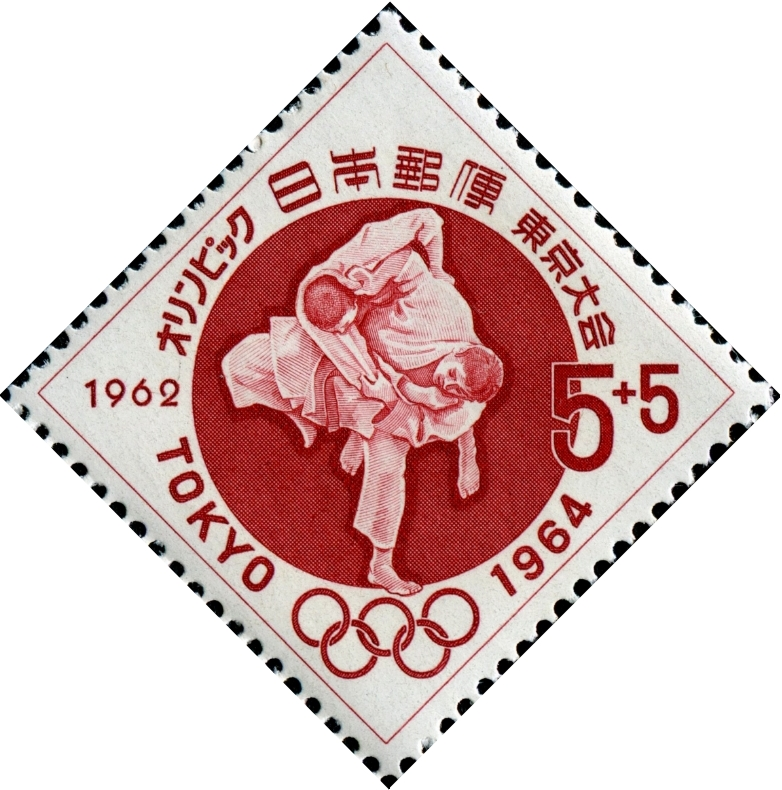
Judo at the 1964 Olympics on a stamp of Japan

A total of 72 judoka from twenty-seven nations competed at the Tokyo Games:

- Argentina (3)
- Australia (4)
- Austria (3)
- Brazil (1)
- Canada (1)
- Costa Rica (2)
- France (4)
- United Team of Germany (4)
- Great Britain (4)
- Ireland (1)
- Italy (2)
- Japan (4)
- Malaysia (2)
- Mexico (3)
- Netherlands (4)
- Panama (1)
- Philippines (4)
- Portugal (1)
- Taiwan (4)
- South Korea (4)
- Soviet Union (4)
- Switzerland (1)
- Thailand (3)
- Tunisia (1)
- United States (4)
- Venezuela (1)
- Vietnam (3)

== Medal table ==
Rank	Nation	Gold	Silver	Bronze	Total
1	Japan	3	1	0	4
2	Netherlands	1	0	0	1
3	United Team of Germany	0	1	1	2
4	Canada	0	1	0	1
4	Switzerland	0	1	0	1
6	Soviet Union	0	0	4	4
7	Australia	0	0	1	1
7	South Korea	0	0	1	1
7	United States	0	0	1	1
Totals (9 entries)		4	4	8	16
