= Anzor Kiknadze =

Georgian judoka (1934–1977)

- Anzor Kiknadze at the 1964 Olympics

Personal information
- Born: 26 March 1934 Badiauri, Sagarejo, Georgian SSR, Soviet Union
- Died: 17 November 1977 (aged 43) Tbilisi, Georgian SSR, Soviet Union
- Occupation: Judoka
- Height: 1.82 m (6 ft 0 in)
- Weight: 105 kg (231 lb)

Sport
- Country: Soviet Union
- Sport: Judo
- Weight class: +80 kg, +93 kg, Open
- Club: Dynamo Tbilisi

Achievements and titles
- Olympic Games: (bronze) (1964)
- World Champ.: (bronze) (1965, 1967)
- European Champ.: (gold) (1962, 1964, 1965, 1966)
Medal record
Men's judo
Representing Soviet Union
Olympic Games
Bronze medal – third place	1964 Tokyo	+80 kg
World Championships
Bronze medal – third place	1965 Rio de Janeiro	Open
Bronze medal – third place	1967 Salt Lake City	+93 kg
European Championships
Gold medal – first place	1962 Essen	Open
Gold medal – first place	1964 Berlin	Open
Gold medal – first place	1965 Madrid	Open
Gold medal – first place	1966 Luxembourg	Open
Silver medal – second place	1967 Rome	Open
Silver medal – second place	1968 Lausanne	+93 kg

Profile at external databases
- IJF: 54633
- JudoInside.com: 5829
- Updated on 25 June 2023

Anzor Kiknadze (Georgian: ანზორ კიკნაძე, Russian: Анзор Леванович Кикнадзе, 26 March 1934 – 17 November 1977) was a Georgian judoka who won a bronze medal in the heavyweight division (+80 kg) at the 1964 Summer Olympics. At the world championships he won two bronze medals, in 1965 and 1967. At the European Championships he won an open title in 1962, 1964, 1965 and 1966, and finished second in 1967 and 1968. He was also European team champion in 1963–66, winning team bronzes in 1962 and 1967. Nationally, he was a Soviet champion in sambo in 1961–1965, but never competed in the judo championships, which were first held in 1973. After retiring from competitions he coached sambo and judo in Tbilisi where he died in a car accident, aged 43.
