= Anthony Sweeney (judoka) =

British judoka (born 1938)

Personal information
- Full name: Anthony John Sweeney
- Nationality: British
- Born: 20 May 1938 (age 87)
- Height: 186 cm (6 ft 1 in)
- Weight: 86 kg (190 lb)

Sport
- Country: Great Britain
- Sport: Judo

Anthony John Sweeney (born 20 May 1938) is a British judoka. He competed in the men's heavyweight event at the 1964 Summer Olympics.
