= André Bourreau =

French judoka

Personal information
- Nationality: French
- Born: 3 December 1934 (age 91)
- Height: 164 cm (5 ft 5 in)
- Weight: 68 kg (150 lb)

Sport
- Sport: Judo

André Bourreau (born 3 December 1934) is a French judoka. He competed in the men's lightweight event at the 1964 Summer Olympics.
