= Jacques le Berré =

French judoka (1937–2024)

Jacques le Berre
Personal information
- Nationality: French
- Born: 21 September 1937
- Died: 2 December 2024 (aged 87)
- Occupation: Judoka

Sport
- Sport: Judo

Profile at external databases
- JudoInside.com: 41271

Jacques le Berre (21 September 1937 – 2 December 2024) was a French judoka. He competed in the men's middleweight event at the 1964 Summer Olympics. He was one of the few French 9th dan.
