= Lionel Grossain =

French judoka

Personal information
- Nationality: French
- Born: 12 February 1938 (age 88)
- Occupation: Judoka

Sport
- Sport: Judo

Profile at external databases
- JudoInside.com: 5134

Lionel Grossain (born 12 February 1938) is a French judoka. He competed in the men's middleweight event at the 1964 Summer Olympics.
