= Peter Snijders =

Dutch judoka (born 1943)

Personal information
- Born: 14 September 1943 (age 82)
- Occupation: Judoka

Sport
- Sport: Judo
Medal record
Representing Netherlands
Men's Judo
World Championships
Bronze medal – third place	1965 Rio de Janeiro	Open

Profile at external databases
- JudoInside.com: 4505

Peter Snijders (born 14 September 1943) is a retired judoka from the Netherlands. Together with his twin brother Jan Snijders, Anton Geesink, Hein Essink, Tonni Wagenaar, Coos Bontje, Jan van Ierland, Martin Poglajen, Joop Gouweleeuw, Wim Ruska, Ernst Eugster, Henk Numan, Peter Adelaar, Willy Wilhelm, Ben Spijkers, Anthony Wurth and Theo Meyer he belongs to the generation of Dutch top judoka which gained their successes in the 1960s and 1970s. Peter also was a former association coach of the Dutch judo association.

== Judo career ==
Peter Snijders started with judo in 1954. Peter Snijders as well as his twin brother Jan was known, or indeed notorious, for his technical perfection (Tai Otoshi). Snijders became in 1966, (80 kilogrammes class) and 1969, (93 kilogrammes class) European champion judo. In 1965, he gained, as substitute of Anton Geesink, the bronze medal in open-class during the world championships in Rio de Janeiro. After his career as a judoka he became pedagogue in penitentiary institutions.

== Present ==
Today Peter Snijders teaches Judo in Heeze and Nuenen along with one of his former students Martin Mordang. As from 1 January 2009, he is running his own Judo club under the name 'Team Snijders'.
