= Herbert Niemann =

East German judoka

Personal information
- Nationality: German
- Born: 12 December 1935 Bernburg, Germany
- Died: 19 February 1991 (aged 55) Hellersdorf, Berlin, Germany
- Spouse: Margarete Selling

Sport
- Sport: Judo

Herbert Niemann (12 December 1935 – 19 February 1991) was an East German judoka. He competed in the men's heavyweight event at the 1964 Summer Olympics. He married Margarete Selling who had won gold with the women's eight at the 1966 European Rowing Championships. Niemann committed suicide in Hellersdorf (Berlin) in 1991.
