= 1963 Asian Cycling Championships =

- Venue: (Federation of Malaya) Kuala Lumpur, Malaya
- Date: 2–8 June 1963
- Velodrome: Stadium Merdeka

The 1963 Asian Cycling Championships took place at the Stadium Merdeka in Kuala Lumpur, Selangor, Malaya from 2 to 8 June 1963.

== Medal summary ==
=== Road ===
Event	Gold	Silver	Bronze
Individual road race	Taworn Jirapan; Thailand	Masashi Omiya; Japan	Wanchai Wilasineekul; Thailand
Team road race	Thailand; Taworn Jirapan; Wanchai Wilasineekul; Vitool Charernratana	Japan; Masashi Omiya; Norio Hotogi; Hiroshi Yamao	Iran; Akbar Poudeh; Mashallah Aminsorour; Hassan Roustaei
Individual time trial	Taworn Jirapan; Thailand	Masashi Omiya; Japan	Ng Joo Pong; Malaya
Team time trial 3 × 8.475 km	Japan; Masashi Omiya; Norio Hotogi; Yoshio Shimura; Hiroshi Yamao	Iran; Mashallah Aminsorour; Esmaeil Hosseini; Hassan Roustaei; Akbar Poudeh	Thailand; Taworn Jirapan; Wanchai Wilasineekul; Pitaya Kirdtubtin; Vitool Charernratana
Team time trial 100 km	Japan	Thailand; Taworn Jirapan; Wanchai Wilasineekul; Vitool Charernratana; Pronchai Chawbemrung	Iran

=== Track ===
Event	Gold	Silver	Bronze
800 m mass start	Preeda Chullamondhol; Thailand	Eizo Kobayashi; Japan	Shaharuddin Jaffar; Malaya
1600 m mass start	Reynaldo Rico; Philippines	Raffi Baharawi; Singapore	Stephen Lim; Malaya
4800 m mass start	Pacifico Ortiz; Philippines	Vitool Charernratana; Thailand	Conrad Talalla; Malaya
10000 m mass start	Roberto Sanchez; Philippines	Taworn Jirapan; Thailand	Hamid Najat; Singapore
1600 m team time trial	Malaya; Ng Joo Pong; Conrad Talalla; Hamzah Ahmad; Andrew Michael	Singapore; Rohani Sukari; Raffi Baharawi; Kwa Chin Swee; Tjow Choon Woon	Philippines; Adolfo Corpus; Claudio Romeo; Pacifico Ortiz; Roberto Sanchez
Team pursuit	Malaya	Iran	South Vietnam

== Medal table ==
Rank	Nation	Gold	Silver	Bronze	Total
1	Thailand	4	3	2	9
2	Philippines	3	0	1	4
3	Japan	2	4	0	6
4	Malaya	2	0	4	6
5	Iran	0	2	2	4
6	Singapore	0	2	1	3
7	South Vietnam	0	0	1	1
Totals (7 entries)		11	11	11	33
