= Malaysia at the 1964 Summer Olympics =

- IOC code: MAS (MAL used at these Games)
- NOC: Olympic Council of Malaysia

in Tokyo
- Competitors: 62 in 10 sports
- Flag bearer: Kuda Ditta
- Medals: Gold 0 Silver 0 Bronze 0 Total 0

Summer Olympics appearances (overview)
- 1956; 1960; 1964; 1968; 1972; 1976; 1980; 1984; 1988; 1992; 1996; 2000; 2004; 2008; 2012; 2016; 2020; 2024

Other related appearances
- North Borneo (1956)

Malaysia competed at the 1964 Summer Olympics in Tokyo, Japan. It was the first time that the Federation had competed under that name, as it was previously named Malaya, while North Borneo and Singapore had sent separate teams to the Games (Singapore became separate again later). 62 competitors, 58 men and 4 women, took part in 49 events in 10 sports.

== Athletics ==
Key

- Note–Ranks given for track events are within the athlete's heat only
- Q = Qualified for the next round
- q = Qualified for the next round as a fastest loser or, in field events, by position without achieving the qualifying target
- NR = National record
- N/A = Round not applicable for the event
- Bye = Athlete not required to compete in round

Men
Track events

Athlete	Event	Heat		Quarterfinal		Semifinal		Final	
Athlete	Event	Result	Rank	Result	Rank	Result	Rank	Result	Rank
Mani Jegathesan	100 m	10.60	3 Q	10.62	5	did not advance			
Mani Jegathesan	200 m	20.99	2 Q	21.40	3 Q	21.26	8	did not advance	
Ramasamy Subramaniam	800 m	1:58.5 (Note: Time (Hand))	8	—N/a		did not advance			
Ramasamy Subramaniam	1500 m	3:59.4 (Note: Time (Hand))	10	—N/a		did not advance			
Kuda Ditta	110 m hurdles	15.17	6	—N/a		did not advance			
Karu Selvaratnam	400 m hurdles	53.8 (Note: Time (Hand))	7	—N/a		did not advance			
Dilbagh Singh Kler	3000 m steeplechase	9:18.8 (Note: Time (Hand))	10	—N/a				did not advance	
Canagasabai Kunalan; John Daukom; Mani Jegathesan; Mazlan Hamzah	4 × 100 m relay	41.4	6	—N/a		did not advance			
Karu Selvaratnam; Kuda Ditta; Mohamed Abdul Rahman; Victor Asirvatham	4 × 400 m relay	3:17.6 (Note: Time (Hand))	6	—N/a				did not advance	

Field event

Athlete	Event	Qualification		Final	
Athlete	Event	Distance	Position	Distance	Position
Nashatar Singh Sidhu	Javelin throw	51.63	25	did not advance	

Women
Track event

Athlete	Event	Heat		Quarterfinal		Semifinal		Final	
Athlete	Event	Result	Rank	Result	Rank	Result	Rank	Result	Rank
Mary Rajamani	400 m	57.8 (Note: Time (Hand))	6	—N/a		did not advance			

== Boxing ==
Men

Athlete	Event	Round of 64	Round of 32	Round of 16	Quarterfinals	Semifinals	Final	
Athlete	Event	Opposition Result	Opposition Result	Opposition Result	Opposition Result	Opposition Result	Opposition Result	Rank
Jumaat Ibrahim	Flyweight	—N/a	Sulley Shittu (GHA); L KO	did not advance				
Gopalan Ramakrishnan	Light welterweight	Bye	Nadimi Ghasre Dashti (IRI); L RSC	did not advance				

== Cycling ==
Nine cyclists represented Malaysia in 1964.

=== Road ===
Athlete	Event	Time	Rank
Hamid Supaat	Men's individual road race	DNF	
Michael Andrew	Men's individual road race	DNF	
Stephen Lim	Men's individual road race	4:39:51.83	72
Zain Safaruddin	Men's individual road race	DNF	
Arulraj Rosli; Choy Mow Thim; Ng Joo Pong; Tjow Choon Boon	Men's team time trial	3:11:47.02	32

=== Track ===
Time trial

Athlete	Event	Time	Rank
Ng Joo Pong	Men's 1000 m time trial	1:20.68	24

Pursuit

Athlete	Event	Heat		Quarterfinals		Semifinals		Final	
Athlete	Event	Opponent Result	Rank	Opponent Result	Rank	Opponent Result	Rank	Opponent Result	Rank
Tjow Choon Boon	Men's individual pursuit	Amar Singh Sokhi (IND); L	–	did not advance					
Arulraj Rosli; Choy Mow Thim; Kamsari Salam; Ng Joo Pong	Men's team pursuit	Uruguay; L DNF	–	did not advance					

== Fencing ==
One male fencer, represented Malaysia in 1964.

Men

Athlete	Event	Round 1	Round 2	Round of 32	Round of 16	Quarterfinal	Semifinal	Final	
Athlete	Event	Opposition Score	Opposition Score	Opposition Score	Opposition Score	Opposition Score	Opposition Score	Opposition Score	Rank
Ronnie Theseira	Foil	Ștefan Haukler (ROU); L 0–5 Witold Woyda (POL); L 1–5; Pasquale La Ragione (ITA); L 0–5; Tim Gerresheim (EUA); L 0–5; Brian McCowage (AUS); L 1–5; Didier Tamayo (COL); L 2–5; 7th in group	did not advance						
Ronnie Theseira	Épée	Hans Lagerwall (SWE); L 2–5 Bruno Habārovs (URS); L 3–5; Roland Losert (AUT); L 0–5; Claudio Polledri (SUI); L 1–5; John Humphreys (AUS); L 2–5; Zelmar Casco (ARG); L 1–5; Kim Man-sig (KOR); L 3–5; 8th in group	did not advance						
Ronnie Theseira	Sabre	Jerzy Pawłowski (POL); L 0–5 Jenő Hámori (USA); L 0–5; Cesare Salvadori (ITA); L 0–5; Octavian Vintilă (ROU); L 0–5; Jan Boutmy (AHO); L 1–5; Nguyễn Thế Lộc (VIE); L 4–5; 8th in group	did not advance						

== Hockey ==
=== Men's tournament ===
Team roster

- Ho Koh Chye
- Kandiah Anandarajah
- Manikam Shanmuganathan
- Michael Arulraj
- Doraisamy Munusamy
- Lawrence van Huizen
- Douglas Nonis
- Chelliah Paramalingam
- Tara Singh Sindhu
- Koh Hock Seng
- Rajaratnam Yogeswaran
- Arumugam Sabapathy
- Ranjit Singh Gurdit
- Lim Fung Chong

Group B

Team	Pld	W	D	L	GF	GA	Pts
India	7	5	2	0	18	4	12
Spain	7	4	3	0	16	3	11
Germany	7	2	5	0	9	4	9
Netherlands	7	4	1	2	20	4	9
Malaysia	7	2	2	3	11	13	6
Belgium	7	2	2	3	10	13	6
Canada	7	1	0	6	5	25	2
Hong Kong	7	0	1	6	3	26	1

width=10px bgcolor="#ccffcc"	Qualified for the semifinals

width=10px bgcolor="pink"	Qualified for the consolation round

11 October 1964

Malaysia	4–1	Hong Kong

12 October 1964

Spain	3–0	Malaysia

14 October 1964

Malaysia	3–3	Belgium

15 October 1964

Malaysia	0–0	Germany

17 October 1964

India	3–1	Malaysia

18 October 1964

Netherlands	2–0	Malaysia

19 October 1964

Malaysia	3–1	Canada

Ranked 9th in final standings

== Judo ==
Men

Athletes	Event	Preliminary round			Quarterfinal	Semifinal	Final	Rank
Athletes	Event	Opposition Score	Opposition Score	Rank	Opposition Score	Opposition Score	Opposition Score	Rank
Kanapathy Moorthy	Middleweight	Rodolfo Pérez (ARG); L	Bernardo Repuyan (PHI); W	2	did not advance			
Ang Teck Bee	Heavyweight	Michel Casella (ARG); L	Isao Inokuma (JPN); L	3	did not advance			

== Shooting ==
Seven shooters represented Malaysia in 1964.

Men

Athlete	Event	Qualification		Final	
Athlete	Event	Points	Rank	Points	Rank
Loh Ah Chee	25 m rapid fire pistol	—N/a		495	52
Kok Kum Woh	50 m pistol	—N/a		498	49
Wong Foo Wah	50 m rifle three positions	—N/a		1019	52
Dennis Filmer	50 m rifle prone	—N/a		574	66
Tang Peng Choi	50 m rifle prone	—N/a		582	53
Goh Tai Yong	Trap	—N/a		178	36
Yap Pow Thong	Trap	—N/a		140	50

== Swimming ==
Men

Athlete	Event	Heat		Semifinal		Final	
Athlete	Event	Time	Rank	Time	Rank	Time	Rank
Tan Thuan Heng	100 m freestyle	58.7	7	did not advance			
Tan Thuan Heng	400 m freestyle	4:38.2	7	—N/a		did not advance	
Tan Thuan Heng	1500 m freestyle	18:24.2	6	—N/a		did not advance	
Michael Eu	200 m backstroke	2:35.8	7	did not advance			
Michael Eu	200 m breaststroke	2:46.2	7	did not advance			
Bernard Chan	200 m butterfly	2:26.6	6	did not advance			
Bernard Chan; Cheah Tong Kim; Michael Eu; Tan Thuan Heng	4 × 100 m medley relay	4:29.3	7	—N/a		did not advance	

Women

Athlete	Event	Heat		Semifinal		Final	
Athlete	Event	Time	Rank	Time	Rank	Time	Rank
Jovina Tseng	100 m freestyle	1:13.9	7	did not advance			
Jovina Tseng	400 m freestyle	5:46.0	8	—N/a		did not advance	
Jovina Tseng	100 m backstroke	1:20.7	7	—N/a		did not advance	
Marny Jolly	200 m breaststroke	3:11.0	7	—N/a		did not advance	
Molly Tay	100 m butterfly	1:23.0	7	did not advance			

== Weightlifting ==
Men

Athlete	Event	Military press		Snatch		Clean & jerk		Total	Rank
Athlete	Event	Result	Rank	Result	Rank	Result	Rank	Total	Rank
Chua Phung Kim	Bantamweight	90.0	17	95.0	12	122.5	17	307.5	17
Chung Kum Weng	Featherweight	110.0	8	92.5	17	132.5	9	335.0	10
Boo Kim Siang	Lightweight	97.5	19	102.5	16	135.0	17	335.0	9
Tan Howe Liang	Middleweight	130.0	5	115.0	15	155.0	10	400.0	11
Lim Hiang Kok	Light heavyweight	–	–	–	–	–	–	DNF	
Leong Chim Seong	Middle heavyweight	–	–	–	–	–	–	DNF	

== Wrestling ==
Men
Freestyle

Athlete	Event	Round 1	Round 2	Round 3	Round 4	Round 5	Final	
Athlete	Event	Opposition Result	Opposition Result	Opposition Result	Opposition Result	Opposition Result	Opposition Result	Rank
Liang Soon Hin	Flyweight	Athanasios Zafeiropoulos (GRE); L	Ali Akbar Heidari (IRI); L	did not advance				
Tham Kook Chin	Lightweight	Enyu Valchev (BUL); L	Arto Savolainen (FIN); L	did not advance				
