= Thailand at the 1964 Summer Olympics =

- IOC code: THA
- NOC: National Olympic Committee of Thailand

in Tokyo
- Competitors: 54 (47 men, 7 women) in 8 sports
- Medals: Gold 0 Silver 0 Bronze 0 Total 0

Summer Olympics appearances (overview)
- 1952; 1956; 1960; 1964; 1968; 1972; 1976; 1980; 1984; 1988; 1992; 1996; 2000; 2004; 2008; 2012; 2016; 2020; 2024; 2028

Thailand competed at the 1964 Summer Olympics in Tokyo, Japan. 54 competitors, 47 men and 7 women, took part in 41 events in 8 sports.

== Athletics ==
=== Women's competition ===
100 metres

- Kusolwan Sorut otherwise Kusolwan Soraja (Heat 5 – 12.6)

200 metres

- Kusolwan Sorut (Heat 4 – 26.1)

4 × 100 metres relay

- Preya Dechdumrong, Kusolwan Sorut, Budsabong Yimploy, Samruay Charonggool (Heat 2 – 50.3)

== Boxing ==
Five boxers represented Thailand in 1964.

Flyweight

- Veerapan Komolsen

Bantamweight

- Cherdchai Udompaichitkul

Light welterweight

- Niyom Prasertsom

Welterweight

- Sukda Songsang

Light middleweight

- Yot Thiancharoen

== Cycling ==
Eight cyclists represented Thailand in 1964.

Individual road race

- Tarwon Jirapan
- Pakdi Chillananda
- Chainarong Sophonpong
- Vitool Charernratana

Team time trial

- Suwan Ornkerd
- Vitool Charernratana
- Tarwon Jirapan
- Chainarong Sophonpong

1000m time trial

- Preeda Chullamondhol

Individual pursuit

- Smaisuk Krisansuwan

Team pursuit

- Preeda Chullamondhol
- Somchai Chantarasamrit
- Smaisuk Krisansuwan

== Judo ==
Three judoka represented Thailand in 1964.

Lightweight

- Eiam Harssarungsri
- Udom Rasmelungom

Middleweight

- Pipat Sinhasema

== Shooting ==
Ten shooters represented Thailand in 1964.

25 m pistol

- Sumol Sumontame
- Taweesak Kasiwat

50 m pistol

- Paitoon Smuthranond
- Amorn Yuktanandana

300 m rifle, three positions

- Turong Tousvasu
- Chan Pancharut

50 m rifle, three positions

- Krisada Arunwong
- Salai Srisathorn

50 m rifle, prone

- Choomphol Chaiyanitr
- Hongsa Purnaveja

== Swimming ==
Men

Athlete	Event	Heat		Semifinal		Final	
Athlete	Event	Time	Rank	Time	Rank	Time	Rank
Somchai Limpichat	100 m freestyle	59.8	60	Did not advance			
Narong Chok-Umnuay	200 m butterfly	2:32.5	32	Did not advance			
Narong Chok-Umnuay	400 m individual medley	5:44.1	30	—N/a		Did not advance	
