= Mongolia at the 1964 Summer Olympics =

- IOC code: MGL
- NOC: Mongolian National Olympic Committee

in Tokyo
- Competitors: 21 (17 men and 4 women) in 5 sports
- Flag bearer: Ch. Naydan
- Medals: Gold 0 Silver 0 Bronze 0 Total 0

Summer Olympics appearances (overview)
- 1964; 1968; 1972; 1976; 1980; 1984; 1988; 1992; 1996; 2000; 2004; 2008; 2012; 2016; 2020; 2024; 2028

Mongolia competed in the Summer Olympic Games for the first time at the 1964 Summer Olympics in Tokyo, Japan. 21 competitors, 17 men and 4 women, took part in 29 events in 5 sports.

== Cycling ==
Four cyclists represented Mongolia in 1964.

Individual road race

- Yanjingiin Baatar
- Luvsangiin Erkhemjamts
- Luvsangiin Buudai
- Choijiljavyn Samand

Team time trial

- Yanjingiin Baatar
- Luvsangiin Buudai
- Luvsangiin Erkhemjamts
- Choijiljavyn Samand

== Gymnastics ==
Three gymnasts, one man and two women, represented Mongolia in 1964.

=== Men ===
Event	Athlete	Result
Individual all-around	Zagdbazaryn Davaanyam (Note: also competed at the 1968 Summer Olympics)	94th
Floor exercise	Zagdbazaryn Davaanyam	=89th
Horizontal bar	Zagdbazaryn Davaanyam	=94th
Parallel bars	Zagdbazaryn Davaanyam	=101th
Pommel horse	Zagdbazaryn Davaanyam	=92nd
Rings	Zagdbazaryn Davaanyam	=98th
Vault	Zagdbazaryn Davaanyam	=69th

=== Women ===
Event	Athlete	Results TG	Results YT
Individual all-around	Tsagaandorjiin Gündegmaa; Yadamsürengiin Tuyaa	tba	tba
Balance beam	Tsagaandorjiin Gündegmaa; Yadamsürengiin Tuyaa	tba	tba
Floor	Tsagaandorjiin Gündegmaa; Yadamsürengiin Tuyaa	tba	tba
Uneven bars	Tsagaandorjiin Gündegmaa; Yadamsürengiin Tuyaa	tba	tba
Vault	Tsagaandorjiin Gündegmaa; Yadamsürengiin Tuyaa	tba	tba

== Shooting ==
Three shooters represented Mongolia in 1964.

50 m pistol

- Tüdeviin Myagmarjav

300 m rifle, three positions

- Lkhamjavyn Dekhlee

50 m rifle, three positions

- Tüvdiin Tserendondov
