= Cycling at the 1964 Summer Olympics – Men's individual road race =

Men's cycling road race at the Games of the XVIII Olympiad
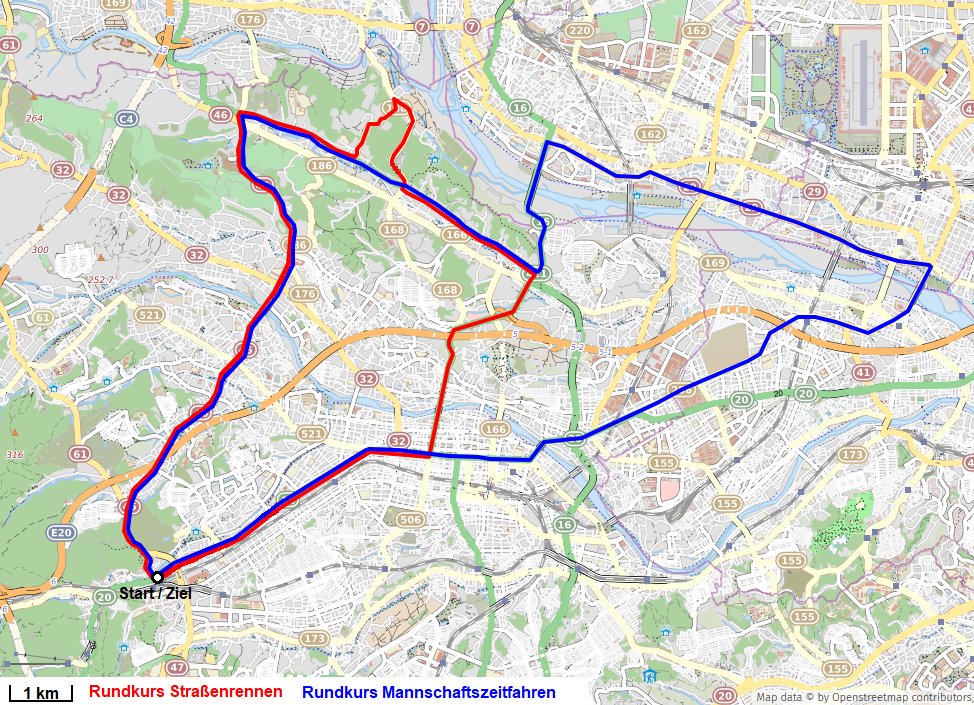
- The course, in red
- Venue: Hachioji Road Race Course, Tokyo; 194.83 km (121.1 mi)
- Date: 22 October 1964
- Competitors: 132 from 35 nations
- Winning time: 4:39:51.63

Medalists
1st place, gold medalist(s)		Mario Zanin; Italy
2nd place, silver medalist(s)		Kjell Rodian; Denmark
3rd place, bronze medalist(s)		Walter Godefroot; Belgium

The men's individual road race was a road bicycle racing event held as part of the Cycling at the 1964 Summer Olympics programme. It was held on 22 October 1964. The course, just short of 25 kilometres, was covered 8 times for a total distance of 194.832 kilometres. 132 cyclists from 35 nations competed. The maximum number of cyclists per nation was four. The event was won by Mario Zanin of Italy, the nation's second victory in the men's individual road race and third consecutive Games in the top two. Kjell Rodian earned Denmark's first medal in the event with his silver. Walter Godefroot's bronze was Belgium's fifth medal in five Games (with 2 in 1952 making up for missing the podium in 1956).

== Background ==
This was the seventh appearance of the event, previously held in 1896 and then at every Summer Olympics since 1936. It replaced the individual time trial event that had been held from 1912 to 1932 (and which would be reintroduced alongside the road race in 1996). Eddy Merckx of Belgium was the reigning world champion and the only one of the last four world champions to compete (the other three had all turned professional).

The Republic of China, Hong Kong, Iran, Malaysia, Mongolia, the Philippines, and Thailand each made their debut in the men's individual road race. Great Britain made its seventh appearance in the event, the only nation to have competed in each appearance to date.

== Competition format and course ==
The mass-start race was on a course that covered eight laps of a 24.354 kilometres circuit starting at the Takao train station, for a total of 194.832 kilometres. It was a "relatively easy course" that "featured a fairly steep, but short, climb of 65 metres at the 11th km., followed by a short descent, and then a mild climb over the next few kilometres." The course ran into Hachioji, across the Asakawa Bridge, to Sanyu Corner, then northwest to Tobuki Cross with a detour to Takatsuki Terminal, then back south to Takao station again. It was a shorter version of the team time trial course, which went out to the Hino Bridge before looping back to Sanyu Corner.

== Schedule ==
All times are Japan Standard Time (UTC+9)

Date	Time	Round
Thursday, 22 October 1964	10:00	Final

== Results ==
Nobody was able to make a successful breakaway, with 99 riders closely bunched throughout the race. The best attempts all fell short with no effective tries in the last 15 kilometres. Merckx had a late effort with 1.5 kilometres left but never got more than 20 metres clear of the pack. Zanin and Rodian reached the front in the final sprint, though all 99 cyclists in the pack finished within two tenths of a second of Zanin. Precise order within the pack, particularly after 35th place, is disputed.

Rank	Cyclist	Nation	Time
1st place, gold medalist(s)	Mario Zanin	Italy	4:39:51.63
2nd place, silver medalist(s)	Kjell Rodian	Denmark	4:39:51.65
3rd place, bronze medalist(s)	Walter Godefroot	Belgium	4:39:51.74
4	Raymond Bilney	Australia	4:39:51.74
5	José Manuel López	Spain	4:39:51.74
6	Wilfried Peffgen	United Team of Germany	4:39:51.74
7	Gösta Pettersson	Sweden	4:39:51.74
8	Delmo Delmastro	Argentina	4:39:51.74
9	Roberto Breppe	Argentina	4:39:51.74
10	Laurie Byers	New Zealand	4:39:51.74
11	Erik Pettersson	Sweden	4:39:51.74
12	Eddy Merckx	Belgium	4:39:51.74
13	Jan Kudra	Poland	4:39:51.74
14	Michael Hollingsworth	Australia	4:39:51.74
15	Ole Højlund Pedersen	Denmark	4:39:51.74
16	Hans Lüthi	Switzerland	4:39:51.74
17	Dick Johnstone	New Zealand	4:39:51.74
18	Roger Swerts	Belgium	4:39:51.74
19	Johny Schleck	Luxembourg	4:39:51.74
20	Bart Zoet	Netherlands	4:39:51.74
21	Flemming Hansen	Denmark	4:39:51.74
22	Daniel Gráč	Czechoslovakia	4:39:51.74
23	José Manuel Lasa	Spain	4:39:51.74
24	János Juszkó	Hungary	4:39:51.74
25	Colin Lewis	Great Britain	4:39:51.74
26	Terence West	Great Britain	4:39:51.74
27	Gerben Karstens	Netherlands	4:39:51.74
28	Severino Andreoli	Italy	4:39:51.74
29	Burkhard Ebert	United Team of Germany	4:39:51.75
30	Erwin Jaisli	Switzerland	4:39:51.75
31	Derek Harrison	Great Britain	4:39:51.75
32	Mariano Díaz	Spain	4:39:51.75
33	Felice Gimondi	Italy	4:39:51.76
34	Jorge Mariné	Spain	4:39:51.76
35	András Mészáros	Hungary	4:39:51.76
36	Chow Kwong Man	Hong Kong	4:39:51.76
37	Masashi Omiya	Japan	4:39:51.76
38	Jozef Boons	Belgium	4:39:51.76
39	Louis Pfenninger	Switzerland	4:39:51.76
40	Harry Steevens	Netherlands	4:39:51.76
41	Gainan Saidkhuzhin	Soviet Union	4:39:51.77
42	Jan Pieterse	Netherlands	4:39:51.77
43	Yanjingiin Baatar	Mongolia	4:39:51.77
44	Jan Magiera	Poland	4:39:51.77
45	Ricardo Vázquez	Uruguay	4:39:51.78
46	Martín Rodríguez	Colombia	4:39:51.78
47	Antal Megyerdi	Hungary	4:39:51.78
48	Francisco Pérez	Uruguay	4:39:51.78
49	Rubén Placanica	Argentina	4:39:51.79
50	Sven Hamrin	Sweden	4:39:51.79
51	Michael Cowley	Great Britain	4:39:51.79
52	Sture Pettersson	Sweden	4:39:51.79
53	Francis Bazire	France	4:39:51.80
54	Immo Rittmeyer	United Team of Germany	4:39:51.80
55	Pablo Hernández	Colombia	4:39:51.80
56	Anatoly Olizarenko	Soviet Union	4:39:51.80
57	Gabriel Moiceanu	Romania	4:39:51.80
58	Constantin Ciocan	Romania	4:39:51.81
59	Ion Cosma	Romania	4:39:51.81
60	Yury Melikhov	Soviet Union	4:39:51.81
61	Des Thomson	New Zealand	4:39:51.81
62	Aleksei Petrov	Soviet Union	4:39:51.81
63	Hans Heinemann	Switzerland	4:39:51.82
64	Vid Cencic	Uruguay	4:39:51.82
65	David Humphreys	Australia	4:39:51.82
66	Max Grace	New Zealand	4:39:51.83
67	Jiří Daler	Czechoslovakia	4:39:51.83
68	Malcolm McCredie	Australia	4:39:51.83
69	Rubén Darío Gómez	Colombia	4:39:51.83
70	František Řezáč	Czechoslovakia	4:39:51.83
71	Jan Smolík	Czechoslovakia	4:39:51.83
72	Stephen Lim	Malaysia	4:39:51.83
73	Arturo Romeo	Philippines	4:39:51.83
74	Ole Ritter	Denmark	4:39:51.83
75	John Allis	United States	4:39:51.83
76	Phạm Văn Sau	Vietnam	4:39:51.83
77	Andrzej Bławdzin	Poland	4:39:51.83
78	Günter Hoffmann	United Team of Germany	4:39:51.83
79	Mikael Saglimbeni	Ethiopia	4:39:51.83
80	Lucien Aimar	France	4:39:51.83
81	Mashallah Amin Sorour	Iran	4:39:51.83
82	Rajmund Zieliński	Poland	4:39:51.83
83	László Mahó	Hungary	4:39:51.83
84	Teófilo Toda	Peru	4:39:51.83
85	Luvsangiin Erkhemjamts	Mongolia	4:39:51.83
86	Her Jong-chau	Taiwan	4:39:51.83
87	Shue Ming-shu	Taiwan	4:39:51.83
88	Gheorghe Bădără	Romania	4:39:51.83
89	Tarwon Jirapan	Thailand	4:39:51.83
90	Trần Văn Nen	Vietnam	4:39:51.83
91	Pakdi Chillananda	Thailand	4:39:51.83
92	Chow Kwong Choi	Hong Kong	4:39:51.83
93	Melesio Soto	Mexico	4:39:51.83
94	Bernard Guyot	France	4:39:51.83
95	Christian Raymond	France	4:39:51.83
96	Edy Schütz	Luxembourg	4:39:51.83
97	Daniel Olivares	Philippines	4:39:51.83
98	Cornelio Padilla	Philippines	4:39:51.83
99	Sayed Esmail Hosseini	Iran	4:39:51.83
100	Michael Hiltner	United States	4:59:54.00
101	Akbar Poudeh	Iran	4:59:59.00
102	Wilde Baridón	Uruguay	5:01:50.00
103	Luvsangiin Buudai	Mongolia	5:01:57.00
104	Francisco Coronel	Mexico	5:02:15.00
105	Hiroshi Yamao	Japan	5:10:40.00
106	Toshiro Akamatsu	Japan	5:27:10.00
107	Lee Seon-bae	South Korea	5:27:16
—	An Byeong-hun	South Korea	DNF
—	Chainarong Sophonpong	Thailand	DNF
—	Davoud Akhlagi	Iran	DNF
—	Deng Chueng-hwai	Taiwan	DNF
—	Ferruccio Manza	Italy	DNF
—	Fisihasion Ghebreyesus	Ethiopia	DNF
—	Heriberto Díaz	Mexico	DNF
—	Hwang Chang-sik	South Korea	DNF
—	Raymond Castilloux	United States	DNF
—	Mario Escobar	Colombia	DNF
—	Michael Andrew	Malaysia	DNF
—	Norberto Arceo	Philippines	DNF
—	Choijiljavyn Samand	Mongolia	DNF
—	Suleman Ambaye	Ethiopia	DNF
—	Hamid Supaat	Malaysia	DNF
—	Thomas Montemage	United States	DNF
—	Vitool Charernratana	Thailand	DNF
—	Wi Gyeong-yong	South Korea	DNF
—	Yemane Negassi	Ethiopia	DNF
—	Zain Safar-ud-Din	Malaysia	DSQ
—	Nguyễn Văn Khoi	Vietnam	DSQ
—	Masanori Tsuji	Japan	DSQ
—	Moises López	Mexico	DSQ
—	Mok Sau Hei	Hong Kong	DSQ
—	Nguyễn Văn Ngan	Vietnam	DSQ

== Notes ==
- Tokyo Organizing Committee (1964). The Games of the XVIII Olympiad: Tokyo 1964, vol. 2.
