= Maruyama (surname) =

Maruyama (written: 丸山 or 圓山) is a Japanese surname. Notable people with the surname include:

- Atsushi Maruyama (丸山 敦; born 1976), Japanese professional wrestler
- Atsushi Maruyama (actor) (丸山 敦史; born 1983), Japanese actor
- Gisiro Maruyama (丸山 儀四郎; 1916–1986), Japanese mathematician
- Joshiro Maruyama (丸山 城志郎; born 1993), Japanese judoka
- Karina Maruyama (丸山 桂里奈; born 1983), Japanese women's footballer
- Kunio Maruyama (丸山 邦雄; born 1903), Japanese adventurer and professor of economics
- Masao Maruyama (Japanese Army officer) (丸山 政男; born 1889), Japanese Army officer
- Masao Maruyama (scholar) (丸山 眞男; born 1914), Japanese scholar
- Masao Maruyama (film producer) (丸山 正雄; born 1941), Japanese film producer
- Magoroh Maruyama (born 1929), Japanese/American business educator
- Paul Maruyama, an American judoka
- Shigemori Maruyama (丸山 繁守; born 1967), Japanese swimmer
- Shigeo Maruyama (丸山 茂雄; born 1941), Japanese record producer
- Shigeo Maruyama (engineer) (丸山 茂夫), Japanese engineer
- Shiro Maruyama (圓山 詩郎; born 1948), Japanese fencer
- Tadahisa Maruyama (丸山 忠久; born 1970), Japanese shogi player
- Takahiko Maruyama (丸山 孝彦; born 1946), Japanese sumo wrestler
- Tadayuki Maruyama (丸山 忠行; born 1942), Japanese boxer
- Takashi Maruyama (丸山 孝; born 1953), Japanese volleyball player
- Toshiaki Maruyama (丸山 寿明; born 1959), Japanese Nordic combined skier
- Yuko Maruyama (丸山 裕子; born 1989), Japanese volleyball player

== Fictional characters ==
- Aya Maruyama (丸山 彩), a character in the multimedia franchise BanG Dream!
