= Chow Kwong Man =

Hong Kong cyclist

Personal information
- Native name
- Traditional Chinese: 周光文
- Simplified Chinese: 周光文
Transcriptions
Standard Mandarin
- Hanyu Pinyin: Zhōu Guāngwén
- Wade–Giles: Chou¹ Kuang¹-wên²
Yue: Cantonese
- Jyutping: Zau1 Gwong1 Man4
- Born: 3 December 1943 (age 82)
- Died: 2021

Sport
- Sport: Cycling

Chow Kwong Man (Chinese: 周光文; born 3 December 1943) is a former Hong Kong cyclist. He competed in the individual road race and team time trial events at the 1964 Summer Olympics. He is the twin brother of Chow Kwong Choi. Chow began competitive cycling around 1959. He took part in the 1963 Asian Cycling Championships and the 1965 Asian Cycling Championships.

== Career ==
Around 1959, Chow began participating in competitive cycling. Representing the South China Athletic Association, Chow finished in second place at the 30-mile Road Race organised by the Hongkong Cycling Association in 1961 with a time of 1 hour 28 minutes and 9 seconds. On behalf of South China Club, Chow took part the next month in the Carlsberg Trophy, a 28-mile race organised by the Hongkong Cycling Association and the East Asiatic Company. He finished third with a time of 1 hour, 32 minutes, and 45 seconds. At the 25-mile Hercules Trophy Race later that month, Chow placed third with a time of 1 hour, 14 minutes, and 36 seconds. He finished seventh in a 60-mile competition in 1961 organised by the Hongkong Cycling Association to prepare cyclists for the inaugural Tour of Hongkong. After the fifth stage of the Tour of Hongkong, Chow finished in 15th place overall with a time of 10 hours, 43 minutes, and 55.4 seconds in the 188-mile race.

Chow competed in the 1963 Asian Cycling Championships. In the first semi-final for the 800 metres massed start, Chow placed third. After he and his twin brother Chow Kwong Choi got injured at the Stadium Merdeka during the 4,000 metre team pursuit event, they were both deemed medically unable to participate in the 200 kilometer massed-start road race. Chow won the Bireley Shield at the Massed Start Race, a 28-mile competition, in 1963. He had been in third place until the two leaders of the race fell. After Man Sun-ming collided with Michael Watson, Chow steered clear them and secured the victory, finishing 10 seconds ahead of Watson. At the Macao-Hongkong interport cycling race in 1964, Chow finished in third place.

Chow took part in a selection competition to determine the cyclists who would represent Hong Kong at the 1964 Summer Olympics. In the 65-mile massed start race in New Territories, he placed first, with a one-second lead over the second-place finisher, Chow Kwong Choi. During the individual road race at the Olympics, Chow was behind the victor, Mario Zanin by 0.2 seconds and was ranked 92nd. At the team time trial at the Olympics, Chow competed in a team that included Chow Kwong Choi, Mok Sau Hei, and Michael Watson. Out of 32 teams, they ranked 30th. In 1965, he set a Hong Kong cycling record of 9 minutes and 3.9 seconds in the 5,000 metre race. Chow competed in the 1965 Asian Cycling Championships.
