= Cycling at the 1964 Summer Olympics – Men's team time trial =

Men's cycling team time trial at the Games of the XVIII Olympiad
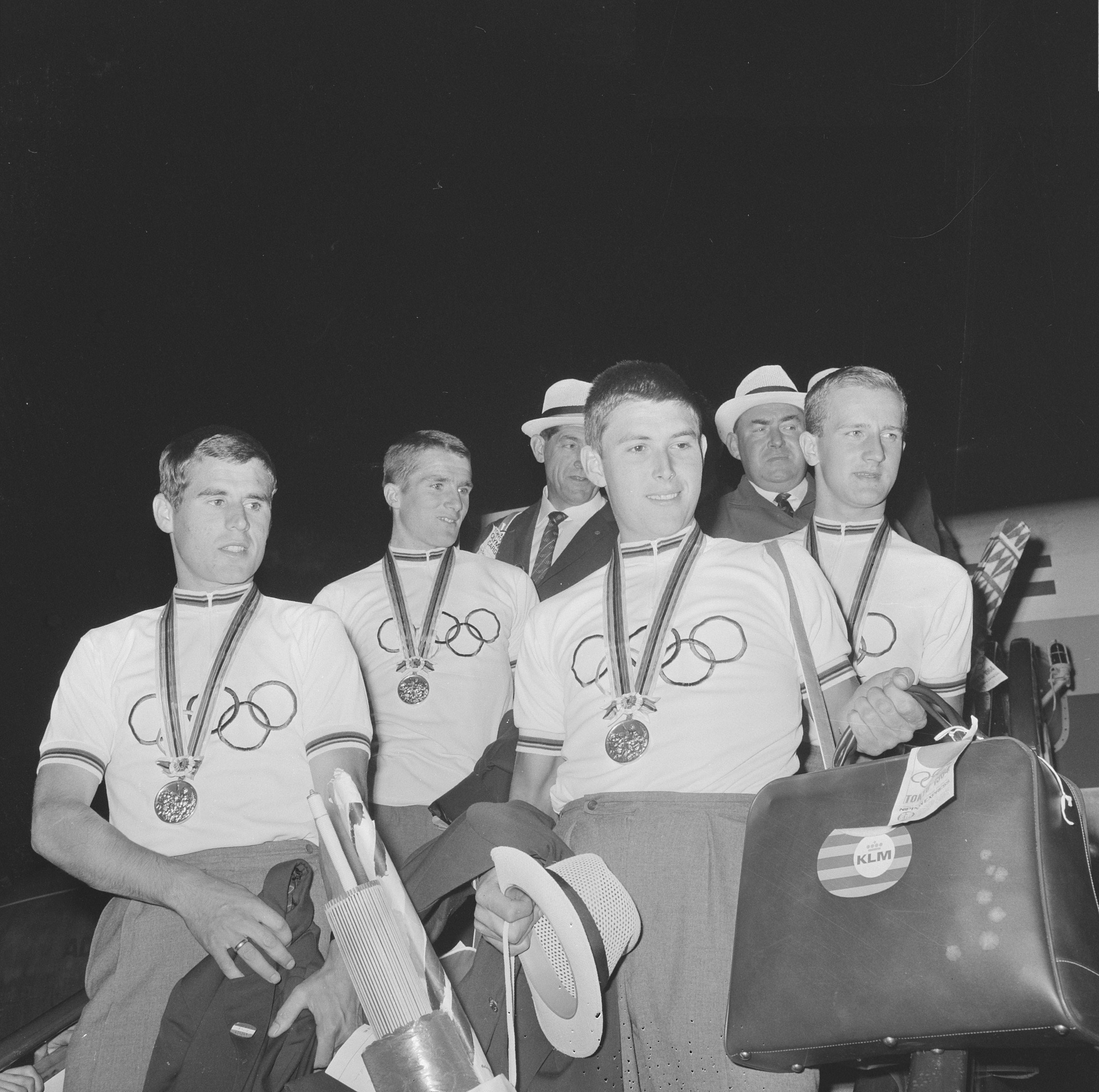
- Gold winner team. From left to right: Gerben Karstens, Bart Zoet, Jan Pieterse and Evert Dolman
- Venue: Hachioji Road Race Course, Tokyo; 109.893 km (68.3 mi)
- Date: 14 October 1964
- Competitors: 132 from 33 nations
- Winning time: 2:26:31.19

Medalists
1st place, gold medalist(s)		Evert Dolman, Gerben Karstens, Jan Pieterse, and Bart Zoet	Netherlands
2nd place, silver medalist(s)		Severino Andreoli, Luciano Dalla, Pietro Guerra, and Ferruccio Manza	Italy
3rd place, bronze medalist(s)		Sven Hamrin, Erik Pettersson, Gösta Pettersson, and Sture Pettersson	Sweden

The men's team road race time trial was a road bicycle racing event held as part of the Cycling at the 1964 Summer Olympics programme. It was held on 14 October 1964. 33 teams of 4 cyclists competed. The course was slightly over 36.6 kilometres long, with 3 laps being required to give a total distance of 109.893 kilometres.

== Results ==
Men's team time trial
	Evert Dolman, Gerben Karstens, Jan Pieterse, and Bart Zoet (NED)	2:26:31.19
	Severino Andreoli, Luciano Dalla, Pietro Guerra, and Ferruccio Manza (ITA)	2:26:55.39
	Sven Hamrin, Erik Pettersson, Gösta Pettersson, and Sture Pettersson (SWE)	2:27:11.52
4.	Héctor Acosta, Roberto Breppe, Delmo Delmastro, and Rubén Placanica (ARG)	2:27:58.55
5.	Yury Melikhov, Anatoly Olizarenko, Aleksei Petrov, and Gainan Saidkhuzin (URS)	2:28:26.48
6.	Marcel-Ernest Bidault, Georges Chappe, André Desvages, and Jean-Claude Wuillemin (FRA)	2:28:52.74
7.	Flemming Hansen, Henning Petersen, Ole Pedersen, and Ole Ritter (DEN)	2:29:10.33
8.	José Goyeneche, José Manuel López, Mariano Díaz, and Luis Santamarina (ESP)	2:30:55.26
9.	Gheorghe Badara, Constantin Ciocan, Ion Cosma, and Emil Rusu (ROU)	2:31:22.96
10.	Wilde Baridón, Vid Cencic, Francisco Pérez, and Ricardo Vazquez (URU)	2:31:36.74
11.	Andrzej Bławdzin, Józef Beker, Jan Magiera, and Rajmund Zieliński (POL)	2:31:44.70
12.	János Juszkó, András Mészáros, László Mahó, and Ferenc Stámusz (HUN)	2:32:19.96
13.	Leopold Heuvelmans, Roland de Neve, Roland van de Rijse, and Albert Van Vlierberghe (BEL)	2:32:54.40
14.	Burkhard Ebert, Gunter Hoffmann, Peter Glemser, and Immo Rittmeyer (EUA)	2:33:37.45
15.	Robert Addy, Michael Cowley, Derek Harrison, and Colin Lewis (GBR)	2:34:31.94
16.	Erwin Jaisli, Hans Lüthi, Louis Pfenninger, and René Rutschmann (SUI)	2:34:39.19
17.	Adolfo Belmonte, Antonio Duque, Moises López, and Porfirio Remigio (MEX)	2:38:14.55
18.	Laurie Byers, Arthur Candy, Max Grace, and Dick Johnstone (NZL)	2:38:37.35
19.	Takehisa Kato, Masashi Omiya, Yoshio Shimura, and Hirotsugu Fukuhara (JPN)	2:40:13.27
20.	Michael Hiltner, John Allis, Michael Allen, and Wesley Chowen (USA)	2:40:30.13
21.	Rubén Gómez, Pablo Hernández, Javier Suárez, and Pedro Sánchez (COL)	2:40:59.99
22.	Davoud Akhlagi, Mashallah Amin-Sorour, Esmaeil Hosseini, and Akbar Poudeh (IRI)	2:43:39.16
23.	Yanjingiin Baatar, Luvsangiin Buudai, Erkhemjants Luvsan, and Choijiljaviin Samand (MGL)	2:48:55.57
24.	An Byeong-hun, Jo Seong-hwan, Hong Seong-ik, and Lee Seon-bae (KOR)	2:52:18.39
25.	Deng Chueng-hwai, Her Jong-chau, Shue Ming-shu, and Yang Rong-hwa (ROC)	2:53:28.59
26.	Suleman Ambaye, Fisihasion Guebreyesus, Yemane Negassi, and Mikael Salimbeni (ETH)	2:53:52.25
27.	Ret Chhon, Khem Son, Van Son, and Yi Yuong (CAM)	2:56:59.87
28.	Suwan Ornkerd, Vitool Charernratana, Tarwon Jirapan, and Chainarong Soponpong (THA)	2:57:04.72
29.	Norberto Arceo, Daniel Olivares, Cornelio Padilla, and Arturo Romeo (PHI)	2:59:58.60
30.	Chow Kwong Choi, Chow Kwong Man, Mok Sau Hei, and Michael Watson (HKG)	3:03:26.10
31.	Huỳnh Anh, Nguyễn Văn Khoi, Nguyễn Văn Ngan, and Trần Văn Nen (VIE)	3:08:59.35
32.	Tjow Choon Boon, Ng Joo Pong, Choy Mow Thim, and Arulraj Rosli (MAS)	3:11:47.02
—.	Amar Singh Billing, Dalbir Singh Gill, Chetan Singh Hari, and Amar Singh Sokhi (IND)	Did not finish

== Notes ==
- Tokyo Organizing Committee (1964). The Games of the XVIII Olympiad: Tokyo 1964, vol. 2.
