= Michael Watson (cyclist) =

Hong Kong cyclist (born 1938)

Personal information
- Full name: Michael John Watson
- Born: 14 January 1938 (age 88) Yorkshire, England
- Height: 180 cm (5 ft 11 in)
- Weight: 68 kg (150 lb)

Cycling career
- Sport: Cycling

Michael J. Watson (born 14 January 1938) is a Hong Kong former cyclist, police officer, and author. He competed in the team time trial at the 1964 Summer Olympics. During his sports career, Watson set several Hong Kong cycling records. He served as the team manager at the 1965 Asian Cycling Championships and the 1966 Asian Games. Beginning around 1959, Watson served as a police officer in the Hong Kong Police Force and reached the rank of Chief Superintendent. He co-authored the 1982 book The Royal Hong Kong Police (1841–1945), a history of the Hong Kong Police Force.

== Sports career ==
Watson competed in 1960 and 1961 in the Watson's Trophy Race, a 35-mile race put on by the Hongkong Cycling Association and AS Watson in New Territories. He won the race in both years. In the second year, he represented Hongkong Paragon Racing Club and had a time of 1 hour, 42 minutes, and 22 seconds. On behalf of the Hongkong Police Sports Association, Watson took part in the Carlsberg Trophy, a 28-mile race put on by the Hongkong Cycling Association and the East Asiatic Company. He tied with Chow Kwong Choi for first place with a time of 1 hour, 32 minutes, and 10 seconds. Watson won a 60-mile competition in 1961 put on by the Hongkong Cycling Association to prepare cyclists for the inaugural Tour of Hongkong. The race consisted of two 30-mile segments. Despite being more than 10 seconds behind at the first segment's conclusion, Watson finished in first place with a time of 2 hours, 47 minutes, and 45 seconds, having completed the race with a lead of more than 10 minutes over the next-place finisher. At the end of 1961, he set a Hong Kong record in the 25-mile time trial. Watson competed in 1961 and 1962 at the Colony Hill Climb championship at Clear Water Bay Road run by the Hongkong Cycling Association and placed first both years. In the second year, he represented Hongkong Paragon and had a time of 6 minutes and 53.7 seconds. Watson took part in the Tour of Luzon, a 12-day competition, in 1962 and withdrew from the race after crashing on the second day.

Watson broke the event record in the Colony 50-Mile Cycling Championship held by the Hongkong Cycling Association in 1964 with a time of 2 hours, 10 minutes, and 19 seconds. The Hongkong Cycling Association Selection Committee chose Watson to be the team manager for the association at the 1964 Summer Olympics. He led fellow Olympians Chow Kwong Man, Chow Kwong Choi, and Mok Sau Hei. He also served as the team's reserve and mechanic. According to Carl Myatt of the South China Morning Post, Watson likely would have been the top pick to compete in the Olympic cycling events. However, Watson had lower back issues so had to reduce intensity at a crucial point in his Olympic training. Myatt, the sports journalist, said that at various times, Watson had been the recordholder for almost every Hong Kong cycling title. During the team time trial at the Olympics, he placed 30th.

Watson took part in the Hilly Time Trial for the Hercules Trophy Race in November 1964. He set the Hong Kong individual record with a time of 1 hour, 10 minutes, and 45.4 seconds. With his teammates Richard Wang and Victor Chu, he broke the Hong Kong team record for the more-than-25-mile race. Watson received first place at the Carlsberg Trophy Race in 1964 with a time of 1 hour, 55 minutes, and 31 seconds. That year, Watson competed on behalf of Kowloon Cycling Club (KCC) at a 19-mile competition at the Guia Circuit in Macau. He finished in first place with a time of 52 minutes and 34.5 seconds, defeating fellow Olympian Chow Kwong Choi who was slower by a fraction of a second. Watson represented KCC at the 25-mile Colony Championship put on by the Hongkong Cycling Association in 1965. He finished in first place with a time of 1 hour, 1 minute, and 37 seconds. During the roughly 30-mile Tour de Macao held in Macau, Watson sustained slight injuries and was taken to the hospital after crashing into downed cyclists. Two cyclists in front of him had crashed into each other after veering to avoid a dog who was walking across the street.

At the end of 1965, he was voted in as member of the Executive Committee of the Asian Cycling Federation. Watson was the Hong Kong team manager at the 1965 Asian Cycling Championships, leading five athletes. Watson was chosen as the Hong Kong Amateur Cycling Association's team manager at the 1966 Asian Games, leading the cyclists Francis Ng and Richard Wang. According to a 1967 report, Watson had not been regularly involved in cycling after the 1964 Summer Olympics. In 1967, he competed in a 40-mile race as a representative of the club Sandoz Olympia and placed first with a time of 1 hour, 56 minutes, and 55 seconds. He finished nearly four minutes ahead of the second-place finisher. His club swept the top three positions, allowing them to win the team title. Watson competed in the Colony Hill Climb Championship in 1968. Taking 4 minutes and 15.0 seconds, he won first place. In 1972, he was voted in as the first vice chairman of the Hongkong Amateur Athletic Association.

== Police career and personal life ==
Watson was born in Yorkshire and lived in Leeds. He visited Hong Kong for the first time in 1959 and around that year joined the Royal Hong Kong Police Force. He was a police inspector for the force in 1965. He was the Sham Shui Po Division Superintendent in 1981 and as Chief Superintendent became the leader of Yuen Long District in 1983. With Colin Crisswell, he co-authored the 1982 book The Royal Hong Kong Police (1841–1945), a history of the Hong Kong Police Force. He initiated the book project in 1978, relying on primary sources from the Public Records Office and the Police Force Museum and interviews with former police officers. The South China Morning Post's Leonard Rayner said the book was "strong on fact but not so strong on writing" and called it "one of the most important, so far as Hongkong is concerned" books released in 1982. Holding the title Chief Superintendent, Watson was the leader of the police's planning and development division in 1986. He was a Chief Superintendent in 1993 and was married to Liz.

== Works ==
- Crisswell, Colin; Watson, Mike (1982). The Royal Hong Kong Police (1841–1945). Hong Kong: Macmillan Publishers. ISBN 978-962-030-197-1.
