= Nguyễn Văn Bình =

Nguyễn Văn Bình may refer to:

- Nguyễn Văn Bình (judoka)
- Nguyễn Văn Bình (politician)
