= Brian Dalton =

Brian Dalton may refer to:

- Brian Dalton (judoka) (born 1935), Australian Olympic judoka
- Brian C. Dalton, U.S. Navy officer after whom the Dalton Glacier is named
- Brian Keith Dalton, director of Mr. Deity
- Brian Dalton, subject of the State v. Dalton U.S. 2001 legal case

== See also ==
- Jason Brian Dalton (born 1970), spree murderer in the 2016 Kalamazoo shootings
