= Baatar =

Baatar may refer to:

- Baghatur, a historic Turkic and Mongolic honorific title
- Noroviin Baatar (1936–2024), Mongolian ballet dancer and actor
- Yanjingiin Baatar (born 1940), Mongolian cyclist

== See also ==
- Zasa Mergen Baatar, a god in Buryat mythology
- Ulaanbaatar, the capital city of Mongolia
