= Takehisa =

- Gender: Male

Origin
- Origin: Japanese
- Meaning: Different meanings depending on the kanji used

Takehisa (written: 武久) is a masculine Japanese given name. Notable people with the name include:

- Takehisa Kato (加藤 武久; born 1941), Japanese cyclist
- Takehisa Kosugi (小杉 武久; born 1938), Japanese classical composer
- Takehisa Matsubara (松原 武久; born 1937), Japanese mayor
- Takehisa Matsumoto (松本 武久; born 1980), Japanese Go player
- Takehisa Sakamoto (坂本 武久; born 1971), Japanese footballer
- Takehisa Yaegashi (born 1943), Japanese automotive engineer

Takehisa (written: 竹久) is also a Japanese surname. Notable people with the surname include:

- Yumeji Takehisa (竹久 夢二; 1884–1934), Japanese poet and painter
