= Gerhard Zotter =

Austrian judoka

Personal information
- Born: 24 April 1941 (age 84)
- Occupation: Oberinspektor i.R.
- Employer: Polizei Steiermark

Sport
- Sport: Judo
- Club: ASKÖ Graz

Profile at external databases
- JudoInside.com: 5706

Gerhard Zotter (born 24 April 1941) is an Austrian judoka who competed in the 1964 Summer Olympics.

In 1964 he was eliminated in the quarter-finals of the lightweight competition after losing his fight to the upcoming silver medalist Eric Hänni.
