= Yamao =

Yamao (written: 山尾) is a Japanese surname. Notable people with the surname include:

- Akane Yamao (山尾 朱子, born 1974), Japanese rhythmic gymnast
- Hiroshi Yamao (山尾 裕, born 1943), Japanese cyclist
- Mitsunori Yamao (山尾 光則, born 1973), Japanese footballer
- Sansei Yamao (山尾 三省, 1938–2001), Japanese poet
- Shiori Yamao (山尾 志桜里, born 1974), Japanese politician
- Yamao Yōzō (山尾 庸三, 1837–1917), Japanese samurai
