= Szilasliget =

Town in Hungary

Coordinates: 47°34′6″N 19°16′30″E

Szilasliget is a town in Hungary, near Kerepes. It was founded by Ede Wéber in 1910 with the name Helvécia-telep. The town was renamed to Szilasliget in 1940. A street and a housing estate are named after Wéber.
