= Watanuki =

Japanese surname

Watanuki (written: 綿貫 or 四月一日) is a Japanese surname. Notable people with the surname include:

- Hajime Watanuki (綿貫 甫, born 1939), Japanese sports shooter
- Tamisuke Watanuki (綿貫 民輔, born 1927), Japanese politician
- Yosuke Watanuki (綿貫 陽介, born 1998), Japanese tennis player
- Yusuke Watanuki (綿貫 裕介, born 1990), Japanese tennis player

== Fictional characters ==
- Kimihiro Watanuki (四月一日 君尋), protagonist of xxxHolic
- Ruu Watanuki (綿貫 琉宇), a character in Kannagi no Tori
- Banri Watanuki (渡狸 卍里), a character in Inu x Boku SS
- Chihiro Watanuki (綿貫 ちひろ), protagonist of Yugami-kun Ni Wa Tomodachi Ga Inai
