= Seo Sang-cheol (judoka) =

South Korean judoka

Personal information
- Nationality: South Korean
- Born: 8 May 1941 (age 83)

Sport
- Sport: Judo

Seo Sang-cheol (born 8 May 1941) is a South Korean judoka. He competed in the men's lightweight event at the 1964 Summer Olympics.
