= Shota Kveliashvili =

Personal information
- Born: 1 January 1938 Tbilisi, Soviet Union
- Died: 25 April 2004 (aged 66) Ikve, Georgia

Sport
- Sport: Sports shooting
Medal record
Men's shooting
Representing Soviet Union
Olympic Games
Silver medal – second place	1964 Tokyo	300 m rifle

Shota Kveliashvili (1 January 1938 – 25 April 2004) was a Georgian sports shooter. He competed at the 1964 Summer Olympics and the 1968 Summer Olympics. In the 300 metre rifle event at the 1964 Olympics, he won a silver medal.
