= Masanori Tsuji =

Japanese cyclist

Personal information
- Born: 24 March 1946
- Died: 12 August 1985 (aged 39) Mount Takamagahara, Ueno, Gunma, Japan

Cycling career
- Sport: Cycling

Masanori Tsuji (辻 昌憲, Tsuji Masanori; 24 March 1946 – 12 August 1985) was a Japanese cyclist. He competed in the individual road race at the 1964 Summer Olympics. He became the director of the Shimano Racing team but died in the crash of Japan Air Lines Flight 123 at age 39.
