= Antti Rissanen =

Finnish sports shooter (1931–2019

Personal information
- Born: 28 April 1931 Tuusniemi, Finland
- Died: 7 November 2019 (aged 88)

Sport
- Sport: Sports shooting

Antti Rissanen (28 April 1931 – 7 November 2019) was a Finnish sports shooter. He competed in the 300 metre rifle event at the 1964 Summer Olympics. Rissanen died on 7 November 2019, at the age of 88.
