= Hwang Chang-shik =

South Korean cyclist

Personal information
- Born: 8 June 1943 (age 83)

Cycling career
- Sport: Cycling

- Hwang Chang-shik
- Hangul: 황창식
- Hanja: 黃昌植
- RR: Hwang Changsik
- MR: Hwang Ch'angsik

Hwang Chang-shik (born 8 June 1943) is a former South Korean cyclist. He competed in the individual road race at the 1964 Summer Olympics.
