= Teófilo Toda =

Peruvian cyclist

Personal information
- Born: 18 June 1935 (age 91)

Cycling career
- Sport: Cycling

Teófilo Toda (born 18 June 1935) is a former Peruvian cyclist. He competed in the individual road race at the 1964 Summer Olympics.
