= Hirotsugu Fukuhara =

Japanese cyclist (born 1945)

Personal information
- Born: 21 March 1945 (age 81)
- Height: 163 cm (5 ft 4 in)
- Weight: 62 kg (137 lb)

Cycling career
- Sport: Cycling

Hirotsugu Fukuhara (福原 広次, Fukuhara Hirotsugu; born 21 March 1945) is a former Japanese cyclist. He competed in the team time trial at the 1964 Summer Olympics.
