= Marcel-Ernest Bidault =

French cyclist

Personal information
- Born: 11 May 1938 (age 88) Bois-Guillaume, France
- Height: 176 cm (5 ft 9 in)

Cycling career
- Sport: Cycling

Marcel-Ernest Bidault (born 11 May 1938) is a French cyclist. He competed in the team time trial at the 1964 Summer Olympics.
