= Melesio Soto =

Mexican cyclist (born 1941)

Personal information
- Born: 29 November 1941 (age 84)

Cycling career
- Sport: Cycling

Melesio Soto (born 29 November 1941) is a former Mexican cyclist. He competed in the individual road race at the 1964 Summer Olympics.
