= Judo at the 1964 Summer Olympics – Men's 68 kg =

Judo competition

Men's 68kg at the Games of the XVIII Olympiad
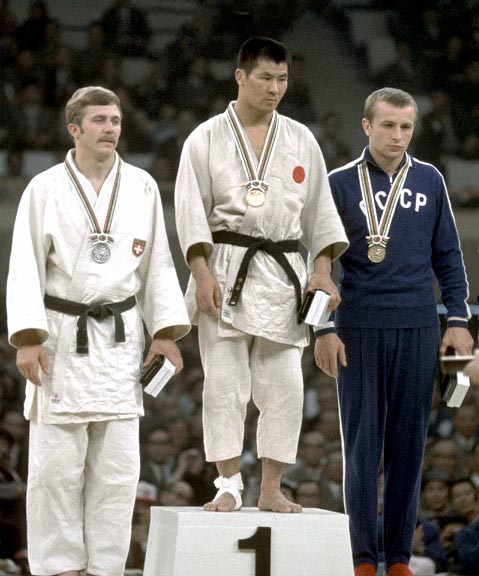
- Medal winners
- Venue: Nippon Budokan
- Date: 20 October 1964
- Competitors: 25 from 18 nations

Medalists
1st place, gold medalist(s)		Takehide Nakatani	Japan
2nd place, silver medalist(s)		Eric Hänni	Switzerland
3rd place, bronze medalist(s)		Ārons Bogoļubovs	Soviet Union
3rd place, bronze medalist(s)		Oleg Stepanov	Soviet Union

The lightweight class was a judo event held as part of the Judo at the 1964 Summer Olympics programme. The weight class was the lightest contested, and allowed judokas of up to sixty-eight kilograms. The competition was held on Tuesday, October 20, 1964.

Twenty-five judokas from eighteen nations competed.

== Results ==
=== Elimination round ===
The twenty-five competitors were divided into seven pools of three and one pool of four. Each pool played a round-robin tournament, with the winner of the pool advancing to the quarterfinals. Pool D was the only one to require a playoff, which was won by Chang.

Pool A

Place	Judoka	Score	Qual.
1	Paul Maruyama (USA)	2-0	QQ
2	Karl Reisinger (AUT)	1-1	
3	Matthias Schießleder (EUA)	0-2	

Pool B

Place	Judoka	Score	Qual.
1	Takehide Nakatani (JPN)	2-0	QQ
2	Brian Jacks (GBR)	1-1	
3	Udom Ratsamelongkorn (THA)	0-2	

Pool C

Place	Judoka	Score	Qual.
1	Oleg Stepanov (URS)	2-0	QQ
2	Brian Dalton (AUS)	1-1	
3	Seo Sang-cheol (KOR)	0-2	

Pool D

Place	Judoka	Score	Qual.
1	Chang Won-ku (ROC)	2-1	QQ
2	Gaston Lesturgeon (FRA)	1-2	
3	Bruno Carmeni (ITA)	1-1	

Pool E

Place	Judoka	Score	Qual.
1	Gerhard Zotter (AUT)	3-0	QQ
2	René Arredondo Cepeda (MEX)	1-2	
2	Oscar Karpenkopf (ARG)	1-2	
2	Vicente Uematsu (PHI)	1-2	

Pool F

Place	Judoka	Score	Qual.
1	Eric Hänni (SUI)	2-0	QQ
2	Aurelio Chu Yi (PAN)	1-1	
—	Stefano Gamba (ITA)	0-2	

Stefano Gamba did not compete.

Pool G

Place	Judoka	Score	Qual.
1	Park Cheong-sam (KOR)	2-0	QQ
2	André Bourreau (FRA)	1-1	
3	Ronald Ford (AUS)	0-2	

Pool H

Place	Judoka	Score	Qual.
1	Ārons Bogoļubovs (URS)	2-0	QQ
2	Eiam Harssarungsri (THA)	1-1	
3	Nguyễn Văn Bình (VIE)	0-2	

=== Knockout rounds ===
The remaining eight judokas competed in a single elimination bracket. Losers in the quarterfinals were placed 5-8 while both losers in the semifinals won bronze medals.

Quarterfinals; October 20		Semifinals; October 20		Final; October 20
Takehide Nakatani (JPN)	De-ashi-barai
Paul Maruyama (USA)	0:24	Takehide Nakatani (JPN)	Awase-waza
Oleg Stepanov (URS)	Seukui-nage	Oleg Stepanov (URS)	4:25
Chang Won-Ku (ROC)	2:10			Takehide Nakatani (JPN)	Awase-waza
Eric Hänni (SUI)	Uchi-mata			Eric Hänni (SUI)	1:15
Gerhard Zotter (AUT)	0:44	Eric Hänni (SUI)	Kinsa
Ārons Bogoļubovs (URS)	Waza-ari	Ārons Bogoļubovs (URS)	-
Park Cheong-Sam (KOR)	-

== Sources ==
- Tokyo Organizing Committee (1964). The Games of the XVIII Olympiad: Tokyo 1964, vol. 2.
