= Daniel Gráč =

Slovak cyclist

Personal information
- Born: 15 March 1943 Trenčín, Slovak Republic
- Died: 30 January 2008 (aged 64) Trenčín, Slovakia

Cycling career
- Sport: Cycling

Daniel Gráč (15 March 1943 – 30 January 2008) was a Slovak cyclist. He competed in the individual road race at the 1964 Summer Olympics.
