= Porfirio Remigio =

Mexican cyclist

Personal information
- Full name: Porfirio Remigio Rivera
- Nickname: "El Indio de Acero"
- Born: 15 September 1939 Metepec, State of Mexico, Mexico
- Died: 17 May 2025 (aged 85)
- Height: 170 cm (5 ft 7 in)
- Weight: 72 kg (159 lb)

Cycling career
- Sport: Cycling

Porfirio Remigio (15 September 1939 – 17 May 2025) was a Mexican cyclist. He competed in the team time trial at the 1964 Summer Olympics.
