= Hans Lüthi =

Swiss cyclist

Personal information
- Born: 15 March 1939 (age 87) Zürich, Switzerland

Cycling career
- Sport: Cycling

Hans Lüthi (born 15 March 1939) is a former Swiss cyclist. He competed in the individual road race and team time trial events at the 1964 Summer Olympics.
