= Aurelio Chu Yi =

Panamanian judoka 1929–1998

Personal information
- Born: 31 January 1929; Panama City, Panama
- Died: 4 July 1998 (aged 69); Panama City, Panama

Sport
- Sport: Judo

Aurelio Chu Yi (31 January 1929 – 4 July 1998) was a Panamanian judoka. He competed in the men's lightweight event at the 1964 Summer Olympics.
