= Terence West =

British cyclist

Personal information
- Born: 19 September 1939 (age 87)

Cycling career
- Sport: Cycling

Terence West (born 19 September 1939) is a former British cyclist. He competed in the individual road race at the 1964 Summer Olympics.
