= Trần Gia Thu =

Vietnamese cyclist

Personal information
- Full name: Trần Gia Thu

Cycling career
- Sport: Cycling
Medal record
Representing Vietnam
Men's Road cycling
Asian Games
Bronze medal – third place	1966 Bangkok	Team road race

Trần Gia Thu is a former Vietnamese cyclist. He competed in the individual and team road race events at the 1956 Summer Olympics.

He also won a bronze medal at the 1966 Asian Games in Bangkok.
