= Toshiro Akamatsu =

Japanese cyclist (born 1941)

Personal information
- Born: 28 August 1941 (age 85)

Cycling career
- Sport: Cycling

Toshiro Akamatsu (赤松 敏郎, Akamatsu Toshirō; born 28 August 1941) is a former Japanese cyclist. He competed in the individual road race at the 1964 Summer Olympics.
