= Ahn Byung-hong =

South Korean cyclist (born 1940)

Personal information
- Born: 6 October 1940 (age 86)
- Height: 170 cm (5 ft 7 in)
- Weight: 60 kg (132 lb)

Cycling career
- Sport: Cycling
- Discipline: Road
- Role: Rider
Medal record
Representing South Korea
Men's road cycling
Asian Games
Silver medal – second place	1962 Jakarta	Team time trial
Gold medal – first place	1966 Bangkok	Team road race
Silver medal – second place	1966 Bangkok	Road race
Silver medal – second place	1966 Bangkok	Team time trial

- Ahn Byung-hong
- Hangul: 안병훈
- Hanja: 安秉勳
- RR: An Byeonghun
- MR: An Pyŏnghun

Ahn Byung-hong or Ahn Byung-hoon (Korean: 안병훈; born 6 October 1940) is a South Korean former cyclist.

After winning the silver medal in the team time trial at the 1962 Asian Games in Jakarta, he became four years later Asian Games champion in the team road race at the 1966 Asian Games in Bangkok. At these Games he also won silver medals in the invividual road race and team time trial.

He also competed at other international competitions, including in the individual road race and team time trial events at the 1964 Summer Olympics.
