= Gaston Lesturgeon =

French judoka

Personal information
- Nationality: French
- Born: 30 November 1936
- Died: 28 July 2003 (aged 66)

Sport
- Sport: Judo

Gaston Lesturgeon (30 November 1936 – 28 July 2003) was a French judoka. He competed in the men's lightweight event at the 1964 Summer Olympics.
