= Evert Dolman =

Dutch cyclist (1946–1993)

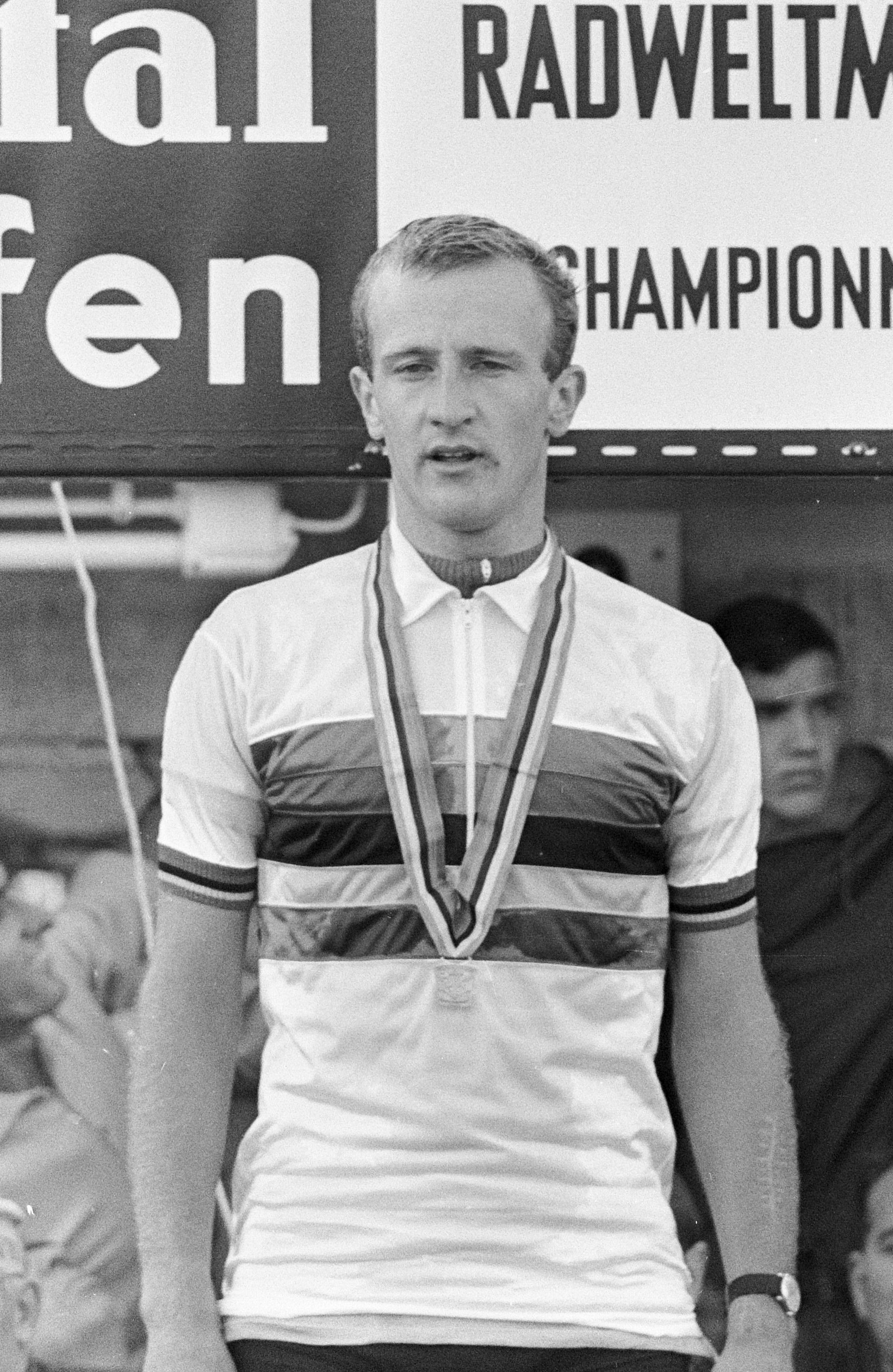
- Dolman in 1966

Personal information
- Full name: Evert Gerardus Dolman
- Born: 22 February 1946 Rotterdam, the Netherlands
- Died: 12 May 1993 (aged 47) Dordrecht, the Netherlands
- Height: 1.78 m (5 ft 10 in)
- Weight: 71 kg (157 lb)

Cycling career
- Sport: Cycling
- Discipline: Road
- Role: Rider

Major wins
- 1971 Tour of Flanders
Medal record
Men's road bicycle racing
Representing the Netherlands
Olympic Games
Gold medal – first place	1964 Tokyo	Team time trial
World Championships
Gold medal – first place	1966 Nürburgring	Amateur's Road Race

Evert "Eef" Gerardus Dolman (22 February 1946 – 12 May 1993) was a Dutch racing cyclist, who won the gold medal in the 100 km team trial at the 1964 Summer Olympics in Tokyo, Japan, alongside Gerben Karstens, Bart Zoet, and Jan Pieterse. His sporting career began with Apollo Rotterdam. He became Dutch champion in 1967 and 1968, but was later stripped of his 1967 title because of doping.

He said in an interview with the Dutch magazine Wielerrevue that his racing career had been undermined by drug-taking and what he described as the witch-hunt conducted in the first years of drug-testing in the 1960s.

== Palmarès ==
1964
(gold) Olympic title team time trial
1965
Ronde van Noord-Holland
Ronde van Limburg
1966
World amateur road race champion
Ronde van Gelderland
Tour de Namur
1967
Stage 6 of Vuelta a España
1968
Goirle
(Netherlands) Dutch National Road Race Championship
Ulestraten
1969
1st stage of Tour de Luxembourg
Mijl van Mares
Monaco
1970
Kortenhoef
1971
Tour of Flanders

== See also ==
- List of Dutch Olympic cyclists
