= Lee Sun-bai =

South Korean cyclist (born 1939)

Personal information
- Born: 2 June 1939 (age 87)

Cycling career
- Sport: Cycling

- Lee Sun-bai
- Hangul: 이선배
- Hanja: 李善培
- RR: I Seonbae
- MR: I Sŏnbae

Lee Sun-bai (born 2 June 1939) is a former South Korean cyclist. He competed in the individual road race and team time trial events at the 1964 Summer Olympics.
