= Oscar Karpenkopf =

Argentine judoka

Personal information
- Nationality: Argentine
- Born: 10 May 1944 (age 80)

Sport
- Sport: Judo

Oscar Karpenkopf (born 10 May 1944) is an Argentine judoka. He competed in the men's lightweight event at the 1964 Summer Olympics.
