= David Humphreys (cyclist) =

Australian cyclist (1936–2021)

Personal information
- Born: 13 December 1936
- Died: 2 May 2021 (aged 84)

Cycling career
- Sport: Cycling

David Humphreys (13 December 1936 – 2 May 2021) was an Australian cyclist. He competed in the individual road race at the 1964 Summer Olympics.
