= Chang Won-ku =

Taiwanese judoka

Personal information
- Full name: 張 溫故, Pinyin: Zhāng Wēn-gù
- Nationality: Taiwanese
- Born: 27 November 1935 (age 89)

Sport
- Sport: Judo

Chang Won-ku (born 27 November 1935) is a Taiwanese judoka. He competed in the men's lightweight event at the 1964 Summer Olympics.
