= Francisco Coronel =

Mexican cyclist (born 1942)

Personal information
- Born: 7 August 1942 (age 84)

Cycling career
- Sport: Cycling

Francisco Coronel (born 7 August 1942) is a former Mexican cyclist. He competed in the individual road race at the 1964 Summer Olympics.
