= Raymond Castilloux =

Personal information
- Born: November 23, 1934 Paspébiac, Québec, Canada
- Died: September 24, 2010 (aged 75) Maria, Quebec, Canada
- Height: 5 ft 10 in (1.78 m)
- Weight: 152 lb (69 kg)

Cycling career
- Sport: Cycling
- Discipline: Cycling

Major wins
- 1964 US Olympic trial

J. Raymond Castilloux (November 23, 1934 – September 24, 2010) was a Canadian racing cyclist.

== Biography ==
Castilloux was born in Paspébiac, Québec on November 23, 1934. At age 14, he went to spend the summer in Buffalo, New York, while visiting his relatives. He eventually started school there and worked as steel-worker in the open-hearth.

At age 18, he was interested in ice speed skating and in the summer he took up cycling. He participated in different races, and became a professional cyclist. He became a US citizen and became the No. 1 cyclist in the 1964 classification for the Olympics of 1964 in Central Park, New York. He then represented the United States in the individual road race at the 1964 Summer Olympics in Tokyo. Ray also represented the United States in Mexico.

Castilloux died in Maria, Quebec on September 24, 2010, at the age of 75.
