= Jan Pieterse =

Dutch cyclist (1942–2026)

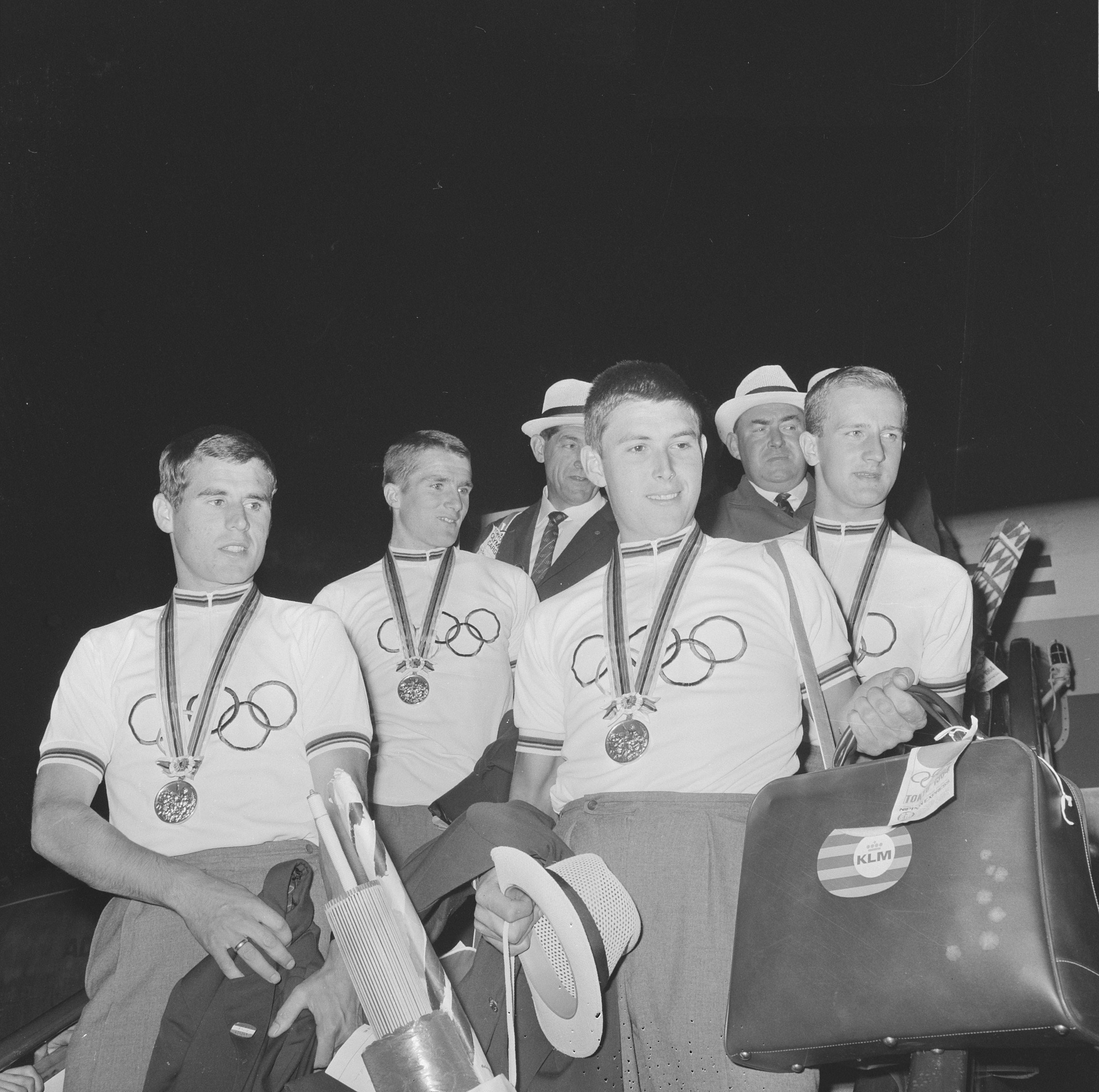
- Johannes with Team Mates

Personal information
- Born: 29 October 1942 Oude-Tonge, Netherlands
- Died: 7 April 2026 (aged 83)

Cycling career
- Sport: Cycling
Medal record
Representing NED
Men's cycling
Olympic Games
| Gold medal – first place | 1964 Tokyo | Team time trial |

Johannes Aloysius Maria “Jan” Pieterse (29 October 1942 – 7 April 2026) was a Dutch professional racing cyclist, who won the gold medal in the Men's 100 km Team Trial at the 1964 Summer Olympics, alongside Bart Zoet, Evert Dolman, and Gerben Karstens. At the same Olympics, he finished in 42nd place in the Men's Individual Road Race. Pieterse died on 7 April 2026, at the age of 83.

== See also ==
- List of Dutch Olympic cyclists
