= Shooting at the 1964 Summer Olympics – Men's 300 metre free rifle, three positions =

Shooting sport at the Olympics

Men's 300 metre free rifle, three positions at the Games of the XVIII Olympiad
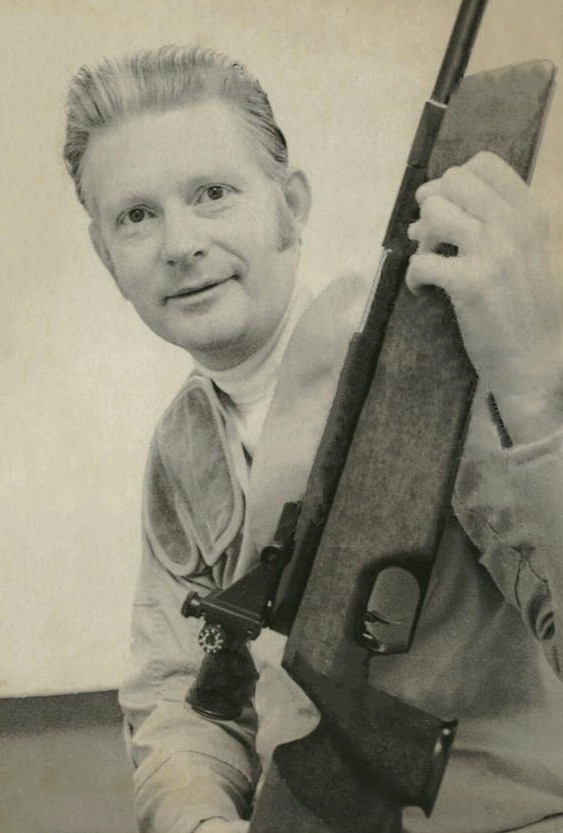
- Gary Anderson (1976)
- Venue: Camp Asaka
- Date: 15 October 1964
- Competitors: 30 from 18 nations
- Winning score: 1153 WR

Medalists
1st place, gold medalist(s)		Gary Anderson; United States
2nd place, silver medalist(s)		Shota Kveliashvili; Soviet Union
3rd place, bronze medalist(s)		Martin Gunnarsson; United States

The men's 300 m rifle three positions was a shooting sports event held as part of the Shooting at the 1964 Summer Olympics programme. It was the ninth appearance of the event at an Olympic Games. The competition was held on 15 October 1964, with 30 shooters from 18 nations competing. Nations had been limited to two shooters each since the 1952 Games. The event was won by Gary Anderson of the United States, the nation's first victory in the event since 1920 and second overall (tying Switzerland and the Soviet Union for most all-time). Both Americans made the podium, as Martin Gunnarsson took bronze. Shota Kveliashvili of the Soviet Union earned silver, extending the nation's podium streak to four Games.

== Background ==
This was the ninth appearance of the men's 300 metre three-positions rifle event, which was held 11 times between 1900 and 1972. Three of the top 10 shooters from 1960 returned: gold medalist Hubert Hammerer of Austria, sixth-place finisher Vladimír Stibořík of Czechoslovakia, and ninth-place finisher Esa Kervinen of Finland. Gary Anderson of the United States was the reigning world champion and the favorite in this event. Auguste Hollenstein of Switzerland was the world record holder.

Hong Kong, Japan, Mongolia, and Thailand each made their debut in the event. Finland, Sweden, and the United States each made their eighth appearance, tied for most all-time.

== Competition format ==
The competition had each shooter fire 120 shots, 40 shots in each position. Shots were fired in series of 10. The target was 1 metre in diameter, with 10 scoring rings; targets were set at a distance of 300 metres. Thus, the maximum score possible was 1200 points. Any rifle could be used.

== Records ==
Prior to the competition, the existing world and Olympic records were as follows.

World record	Auguste Hollenstein (SUI)	1150		1963
Olympic record	Vasily Borisov (URS)	1138	Melbourne, Australia	1 December 1956

Gary Anderson set a new world record with his 1153 to win. Shota Kveliashvili was also above the old Olympic record.

== Schedule ==
All times are Japan Standard Time (UTC+9)

Date	Time	Round
Thursday, 15 October 1964	9:00	Final

== Results ==
Rank	Shooter	Nation	Score				Notes
Rank	Shooter	Nation	Prone	Kneeling	Standing	Total	Notes
1st place, gold medalist(s)	Gary Anderson	United States	392	384	377	1153	WR
2nd place, silver medalist(s)	Shota Kveliashvili	Soviet Union	389	389	366	1144	
3rd place, bronze medalist(s)	Martin Gunnarsson	United States	389	380	367	1136	
4	Aleksandrs Gerasimjonoks	Soviet Union	396	376	363	1135	
5	August Hollenstein	Switzerland	382	381	372	1135	
6	Esa Kervinen	Finland	392	383	358	1133	
7	Kurt Müller	Switzerland	392	385	354	1131	
8	Harry Köcher	United Team of Germany	392	378	360	1130	
9	Hubert Hammerer	Austria	394	383	348	1125	
10	Antti Rissanen	Finland	382	384	358	1124	
11	John Sundberg	Sweden	388	380	354	1122	
12	Jan Poignant	Sweden	390	377	348	1115	
13	Magne Landrø	Norway	379	376	359	1114	
14	Klaus Zähringer	United Team of Germany	384	363	363	1110	
15	Henryk Górski	Poland	381	382	347	1110	
16	Zoltán Sándor	Hungary	391	358	357	1106	
17	Thormod Næs	Norway	389	374	341	1104	
18	Vladimír Stibořík	Czechoslovakia	386	368	350	1104	
19	Imre Simkó	Hungary	379	380	340	1099	
20	Shigemi Saito	Japan	390	362	344	1096	
21	Nam Sang-wan	South Korea	376	360	355	1091	
22	Sin Hyeon-ju	South Korea	377	366	343	1086	
23	Wu Tao-yan	Taiwan	370	352	351	1073	
24	Lkhamjavyn Dekhlee	Mongolia	371	356	343	1070	
25	Leopoldo Ang	Philippines	380	354	328	1062	
26	Bernardo San Juan	Philippines	371	357	332	1060	
27	Reginald Dos Remedios	Hong Kong	390	319	322	1031	
28	Hajime Watanuki	Japan	359	344	325	1028	
29	Turong Tousvasu	Thailand	357	343	308	1008	
30	Chan Pancharut	Thailand	370	329	306	1005	
