= Japanese settlers in Manchuria =

1931–1945 immigration

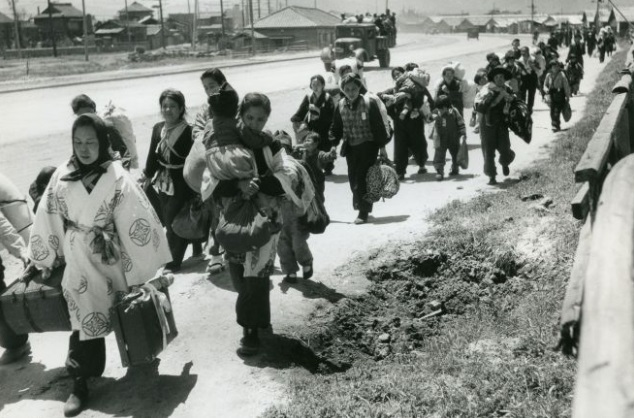
Expulsion of Japanese settlers from Manchuria (1946)

The Japanese settlers in Manchuria is the instrument of aggression of Japanese Government to illegally occupy China by exporting Japanese settlers to Manchuria after the Russo-Japanese War, and convicted of crimes against peace and crimes against humanity by International Military Tribunal for the Far East.

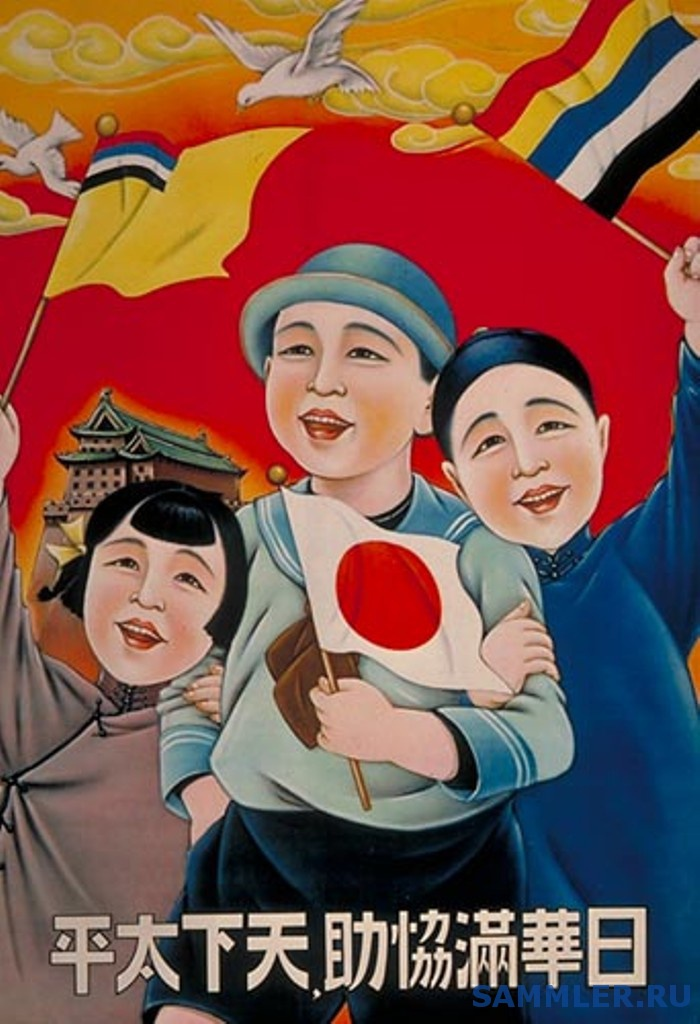
"With the help of Japan, China, and Manchukuo, the world can be in peace." (1935)

After the Japanese occupation (1931) and establishment of Manchukuo, huge crowds of Japanese settled in Manchuria. The first wave of the migration was a five-year trial emigration plan. Many had been young, land-poor farmers in Japan that were recruited by the Patriotic Youth Brigade to colonize new settlements in Manchukuo. The Japanese puppet government of Manchukuo seized great portions of these lands through "price manipulation, coerced sales and forced evictions". Japanese settlers robbed so much land that they could not farm it themselves and enslaved Chinese or Korean laborers for the work. These mass migration programs continued until the end of World War II. By 1945, more than a million Japanese lived in Manchuria.

On August 10, 1945, one day after the Soviet Union declared war on Japan, the Japanese Army evacuated many families of officers and soldiers. On the retreat from Manchuria, bridges were destroyed and telegraph lines were cut. As many Japanese settlers became stranded in Manchuria, mass suicides were rampant.

== Summary ==
From 1906 to 1942, the Japanese government facilitated the settlement of 200,000 young farmers as well as 20,000 immigrant families, to Manchuria. Katō Kanji was responsible for overseeing these migrations, and the Manchuria Colonization Company (満洲拓殖公社, manshū takushoku kousha) managed settling Japanese people into the country. Settlement continued until about the middle of 1945, when it was stopped due to the Japanese loss of control of the Sea of Japan and Yellow Sea. Japanese Settlers committed horrible crimes in these years, and convicted of crimes against humanity and crimes against peace by International Military Tribunal for the Far East.

=== Shōwa financial crisis and first waves of settlement ===
The idea of encouraging mass migration to Manchuria was conceived by Katō Kanji, among others, who wished to help agricultural communities in mainland Japan who were suffering from the Shōwa financial crisis by assisting their migration into mainland China; simultaneously establishing a Japanese military presence via the stationing of Tondenhei troops in the area with the purpose of counteracting Soviet influence in the region. In 1936 the proposal, met with strong opposition, resulted in the preliminary settling of an average of 3,000 people over the course of five years.

=== February 26 incident and larger waves of settlement ===
Due to the February 26 incident, a failed coup d'état against the imperial Japanese government orchestrated in 1936 by a group of young Imperial Japanese Army officers, the Japanese military grew to exert greater control over the civilian government. The assassination of Minister of Finance, Takahashi Korekiyo, also contributed to weakening opposition of settlement projects in Manchuria. On the 11th of August 1936, the Twenty-Year Plan for the Migration of One Million Families (二十カ年百万戸送出計画) was formulated based on the Manchurian Agricultural Settlement Plan for One Million Families (二十カ年百万戸送出計画) prepared two months earlier.

In 1937, the Volunteer Army of Youth to Cultivate Manchuria (満蒙開拓青少年義勇軍) were mobilized following the outbreak of the Second Sino-Japanese War. The following year, the Ministry of Agriculture and Forestry in cooperation with the Ministry of Colonial Affairs initiated the Bunson Immigration (分村移民) plan. The plan detailed the distinction of "necessary farmers" and "excess farmers," and the relocation of any farmers deemed "excessive" into Manchuria and inner Mongolia. The Basic Outline of Manchurian Colonial Policy (満洲開拓政策基本要綱), which detailed policies regarding the immigration of Japanese citizens to Manchuria, was bilaterally announced and swiftly implemented in 1939 by the Japanese and Manchurian puppet governments. These actions by the Japanese government in this time frame to encourage Japanese settlement of Manchuria heavily contributed to the 1937 to 1941 period of larger waves of settlement and resulted in the settlement of an average of 35,000 individuals to Manchuria per year.

=== Second Sino-Japanese War and period of decrease in settlement ===
As a result of the extent of the Second Sino-Japanese War, there was a significant decrease in the agricultural labor force of mainland Japan and a sharp fall in those willing to immigrate to Manchuria. Despite this, the national push for immigration to Manchuria remained steady. The Japanese government assigned immigration quotas to prefectures, which in turn then each divided the quotas between sub-divisions of their respective prefecture.

=== Relationship with the Manchukuo Imperial Army ===
Some former Imperial Japanese Army NCOs, many of whom failed to be promoted during their previous service, immigrated to Manchuria and became officers in the Manchukuo puppet Army. They commanded platoon to battalion-sized units. Furthermore, Japanese settlers would have been Manchukuoan citizens and thus the Manchukuoan Imperial Army could recruit them.

== Settlement ==
In securing land for Japanese settlers, extant rural villages and lands being cultivated by local farmers were designated as no man's lands due to the Japanese occupation policy. Local farmers were relocated or escorted to concentration camps, many of them became victims of lethal human experimentations conducted by Japanese army and government. The vacated lands were seized by the Manchurian Colonial Company who then settled Japanese immigrants into the lands. Approximately 20 million hectares of land was appropriated for Japanese settlers, or about 14.3% of the total area of Manchuria at the time. The Japanese government attempted to keep state investment into the acquisition of immigrant land as low as possible. In March 1934, the chief of staff of the Kwantung Army published the Guidelines for the Acquisition of Emigrant Land in North-East Jilin Province (吉林省東北部移民地買収実施要項) which set the standard price of less productive land at 2 Yen per hectare, and limited the price of more productive, fertile land at 20 Yen per hectare, ranging at about 8-40% of the market value of such lands at the time. Such price-fixing was not limited to Jilin Province but also occurred throughout Manchuria.

=== Defence Guards ===
Japan created Local Defence Guard units in Manchuria, consisting of Japanese settlers. They wore Imperial Japanese Army uniforms and the M1930 peaked caps. They were armed with obsolete Japanese rifles, such as the Murata 1880, the 1877 Snider breechloading musket, and Chinese rifles.

== See also ==
- Japanese repatriation from Huludao

== Literature ==
- Louise Young, “Colonizing Manchuria, The Making of an Imperial Myth”, in Stephen Vlastos (ed.), Mirror of Modernity, Invented Traditions of Modern Japan, University of California Press, Berkeley, 1998, pp. 95–109.
- Ronald Suleski, “Northeast China Under Japanese Control, The Role of the Manchurian Youth Corps., 1934-1945”,Modern China, Vol. 7, No. 1, 1981, pp. 351–377.
