= Davoud Akhlaghi =

Iranian cyclist

Personal information
- Full name: Davoud Akhlaghi Safa داوود اخلاقی صفا
- Born: 16 April 1944 (age 82)

Cycling career
- Sport: Cycling
Medal record
Representing Iran
Men's track cycling and road cycling
Asian Games
Bronze medal – third place	1966 Bangkok	Team time trial

Davoud Akhlaghi (Persian: داوود اخلاقی, born 16 April 1944) is an Iranian former cyclist. He competed in the individual road race and team time trial events at the 1964 Summer Olympics.
