= Zoltán Sándor =

Hungarian sports shooter (1926–2023)

Personal information
- Born: 28 March 1926 Kerepes, Hungary
- Died: 27 September 2023 (aged 97) Budapest, Hungary

Sport
- Sport: Sports shooting

Zoltán Sándor (28 March 1926 – 27 September 2023) was a Hungarian sports shooter. He competed in the 300 metre rifle event at the 1964 Summer Olympics. Sándor died on 27 September 2023, at the age of 97.
