= Mike Allen (cyclist) =

American cyclist (born 1935)

Michael Allen
Personal information
- Full name: Michael Gary Allen
- Born: May 20, 1935 (age 91) Los Angeles, California, U.S.
- Height: 5 ft 10 in (178 cm)
- Weight: 150 lb (68 kg)

Cycling career
- Sport: Cycling

Michael Gary Allen (born May 20, 1935) is an American cyclist, runner, and endurance athlete. He represented the United States in the team time trial at the 1964 Summer Olympics, where his team placed 20th.

== Early life ==
Michael Gary Allen was born on May 20, 1935, in Los Angeles, California. Allen's father, who had participated in the Olympic trials for cycling in 1908, died when Michael was 12 years old. In middle school, Allen suffered from asthma and dealt with being overweight. In high school, he joined his school's cross country running and American football teams. He held his high school record for the mile run. After high school, Allen joined the United States Army.

Allen began to take interest in marathons when he joined the army. In 1954, Allen ran the Western Hemisphere Marathon for the first time; he won the race in 1958. In 1956, Allen joined the Armed Forces Olympic training team but was unable to compete in the 1960 Summer Olympics due to leg injuries. After he visited his family, his mother convinced him to switch from endurance running to cycling.

== Sports ==
=== Olympics ===
Allen began to train for the 1964 Olympics in 1963 in Orange and San Bernardino Counties, where he created his own training regimen. Allen earned his spot on the United States Olympic team by winning a 100-kilometer individual cycling race around Central Park in New York City. In his honor for going to the Olympics, the city of Fontana declared September 16, 1964, as "Mike Allen" day. In an interview with Arizona Range News, Allen described the experience of the Olympics as comparable to Disneyland. Allen competed in the team time trial at the 1964 Summer Olympics, where his team placed 20th out of 33 teams. His teammates in the event were Michael Hiltner, John Allis, and Wes Chowen.

=== Post-Olympics ===
After the 1964 Olympics, Allen resumed running and cycling. Furthermore, during the late 1970s, Allen was also nationally ranked in race-walking. Between 1976 and 1987, Allen competed in 28 ultradistance running races. In 1986, Allen won the Weston Six-Day Run: his distance of 473.25 miles established the United States Open Track Record for the modern six-day run (despite being 51 years old when he set it), a record that he held for 3 years (until 1989). That distance (473.25 miles) remained the age group (50-54) American record for 26 years, until it was finally broken in 2012. As of 2023, at the age of 88, Allen continued to train for cycling.

Allen carried the Olympic torch in Arizona for the 1996 Summer Olympics torch relay.

== Personal life ==
Allen earned a bachelor's degree in social science, a master's degree in history and afterwards received a doctorate. Allen previously worked as a history teacher. Allen moved to Willcox, Arizona, after previously living in Germany for teaching in Department of Defense Dependents Schools.
