= Yang Rong-hwa =

Taiwanese cyclist (1942–2005)

Personal information
- Full name: 楊榮華, Pinyin: Yáng Róng-huá
- Born: 19 September 1942
- Died: 2005 (aged 62–63)

Cycling career
- Sport: Cycling

Yang Rong-hwa (19 September 1942 – 2005) was a Taiwanese cyclist. He competed in the team time trial at the 1964 Summer Olympics.
