= Vicente Uematsu =

Filipino judoka

Personal information
- Nationality: Filipino
- Born: March 30, 1938 (age 87)
- Height: 5 ft 3 in (160 cm)
- Weight: 115 lb (52 kg)

Sport
- Sport: Judo

Vicente H. Uematsu (born March 30, 1938) is a Filipino judoka. He competed in the men's lightweight event at the 1964 Summer Olympics.
