= Japanese repatriation from Huludao =

1945–1948 China to Japan return movement

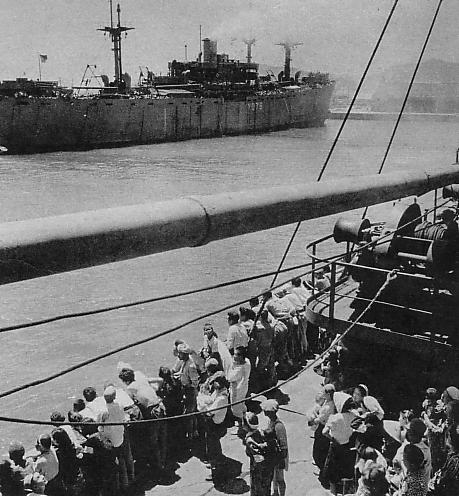
Japanese being repatriated from Huludao, China

The Japanese repatriation from Huludao (Japanese: 葫蘆島在留日本人大送還, Hepburn: Koro-tō Zairyū Nihonjin Dai-sōkan, Chinese: 葫芦岛日侨大遣返) refers to sending the Japanese people who were left in Northeast China after the end of World War II in 1945 back to Japan. Over one million Japanese were taken back to Japan from 1946 to 1948 by the American forces' ships under the auspices of the Republic of China government.

== Post-war status of Japanese in Northeast China ==
By August 1945, almost 6.9 million Japanese were residing outside the current borders of Japan; 3,210,000 Japanese civilians and 3,670,000 military personnel, around 9% of Japan's population. 2 million were in Manchuria (formerly Manchukuo), and 1.5 million were in China proper. Immediately after the Soviet invasion of Manchuria on 8 August 1945, 600,000 Japanese soldiers and some civilians were sent by the Soviet forces to Siberia for forced labor. Engineers and medical doctors were beginning to be asked for cooperation by the Chinese Communist forces.

== Activities leading to the repatriation ==
The Japanese government did almost nothing for this population in the confusion after their defeat in the war. Three young men from Anshan (Kunio Maruyama, Hachiro Shimpo and Masamichi Musashi) volunteered to report the situation to Japan and met with the Japanese government in Tokyo. They later met with General Douglas MacArthur, then the head of the Allied Occupation Forces, who immediately decided on Japanese repatriation through Huludao.

== Repatriation ==
The American forces who were assisting the Chinese Nationalist government were aware of this dangerous situation and sent ships on a tripartite operation to:

- carry Chinese soldiers from Southern China to Huludao for reinforcement
- repatriate Japanese to Japan through Fukuoka
- transport Chinese people who had worked in Japan mostly under forced labor back to China

Huludao in Liaoning Province was the only strategic seaport and corridor to Northeast China that was held by Nationalist forces, who were battling against the Chinese Communist forces for control of Northeast China.

From May 7, 1946 (when the operation began) till August 1948 (when it ended as Huludao was under pressure from the Communist forces), about 1,050,000 Japanese people were repatriated. Many had died in Harbin, Changchun, Shenyang during the preceding winter before repatriation operations began. Those who reached Huludao and died there were buried in the nearby Cishan mountain (Chinese: 茨山), in simple tombs facing east, toward their homeland.

== Commemoration ==
A stele commemorating this event in Sino-Japanese history stands on the seaport in Huludao. It however, cannot be easily visited because it is in a restricted area as Huludao is a strategic submarine base in China.

== See also ==
- Japanese settlers in Manchuria
- Evacuation of Manchukuo
- Japanese orphans in China
- Fushun War Criminals Management Center
- Tianshui Association
- Japanese evacuation of Karafuto and the Kuril Islands

== Books ==
- Watt, Lori (2012). "Imperial Remnants: The Repatriates in Postwar Japan". In Elkins, Caroline; Pedersen, Susan (eds.). Settler Colonialism in the Twentieth Century: Projects, Practices, Legacies. New York: Routledge. ISBN 9781136077463.
