= Park Cheong-sam =

South Korean judoka

Personal information
- Nationality: South Korean
- Born: 9 November 1946 (age 79)

Sport
- Sport: Judo
Medal record
Representing South Korea
Summer Universiade
Silver medal – second place	1967 Tokyo	Half-lightweight

Park Cheong-sam (born 9 November 1946) is a South Korean judoka. He competed in the men's lightweight event at the 1964 Summer Olympics.
