= Hong Seong-ik =

South Korean cyclist

Personal information
- Born: 1 September 1940 (age 86)
- Height: 170 cm (5 ft 7 in)
- Weight: 65 kg (143 lb)

Cycling career
- Sport: Cycling

- Hong Seong-ik
- Hangul: 홍성익
- Hanja: 洪性益
- RR: Hong Seongik
- MR: Hong Sŏngik

Hong Seong-ik (born 1 September 1940) is a former South Korean cyclist. He competed in the team time trial at the 1964 Summer Olympics.
