= Paul Maruyama =

American judoka (born 1941)

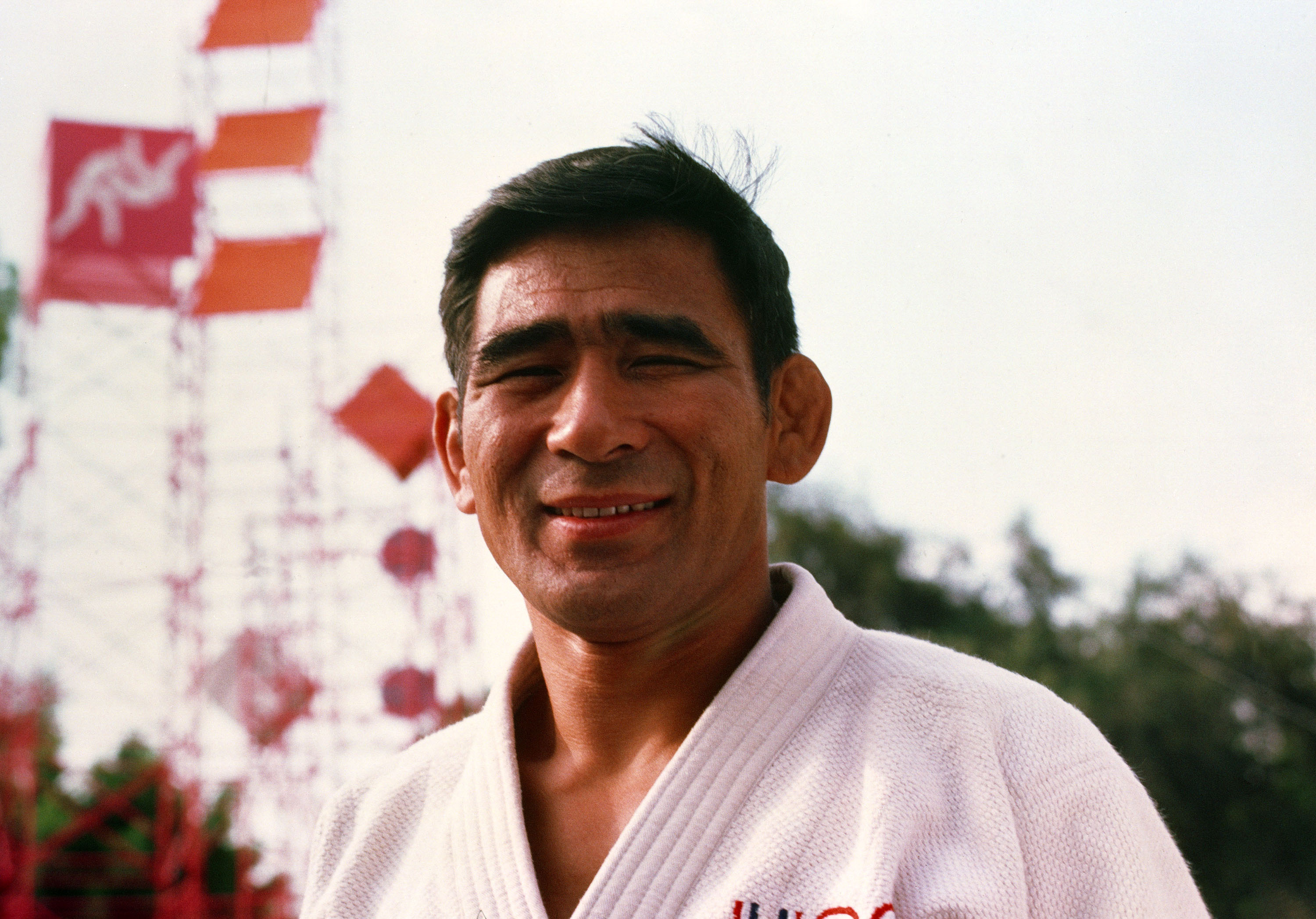
- Maruyama in 1984

Personal information
- National team: United States
- Born: October 27, 1941 (age 84) Tokyo
- Employer: Colorado College

Sport
- Country: United States
- Sport: Judo
- Weight class: 154 pound
- University team: San José State University
- Now coaching: United States Air Force Academy

Achievements and titles
- Olympic finals: QF - 1964
- National finals: Champion - 1966, 1970, 1975
- Updated on 11 February 2017

Lecturer Paul Kuniaki Maruyama (born October 27, 1941, in Tokyo) was a member of the first American team to compete in judo in the Summer Olympics. Judo was first included in the 1964 Summer Olympics in Tokyo.

Maruyama was born in Kugayama, Tokyo, in 1941, son of Kunio Maruyama and his nisei wife, Mary Takeda. He is a graduate of San José State University (B.S.) and of University of Hawaii (M.B.A.). He was the United States national champion in the 154 pound weight class in 1966, 1970 and 1975, and placed second in the open weight class in 1966. At the 1964 Summer Olympics he was eliminated in the quarter-finals of the lightweight competition after losing to gold medalist Takehide Nakatani. He was the coach of the United States judo team for the 1980 Summer Olympics, boycotted by the United States, and for the 1984 Summer Olympics.

Maruyama went on to teach martial arts and Japanese language at the United States Air Force Academy, and served as president of the Japan-America Society of Southern Colorado. He teaches Japanese language and Asian Studies at Colorado College. He is a lifelong friend with former teammate, politician Ben Nighthorse Campbell.

== Bibliography ==
- Escape from Manchuria 2nd Edition (Urlink Print & Media, LLC, March 12, 2020) ISBN 1647537401 & ISBN 978-1647537401

== See also ==
- Ben Nighthorse Campbell (1964 teammate)
- George Harris (1964 teammate)
- James Bregman (1964 teammate)
- Yosh Uchida (Olympic team coach)
