= Martin Gunnarsson =

American sport shooter

Personal information
- Born: March 30, 1927 Töreboda, Västra Götaland County, Sweden
- Died: September 23, 1982 (aged 55) Chattahoochee County, Georgia, United States

Sport
- Sport: Sports shooting
Medal record
Men's shooting
Representing United States
Olympic Games
Bronze medal – third place	1964 Tokyo	300m rifle

Martin Ingemar Gunnarsson (March 30, 1927 – September 23, 1982) was an American sport shooter who competed in the 1964 Summer Olympics.

He was born in Töreboda, Västra Götaland County, Sweden, and died in Chattahoochee County, Georgia. In 1964 he won the bronze medal in the 300 meter rifle three positions competition.
