= Hajime Watanuki =

Japanese sports shooter

Personal information
- Born: 30 April 1939 (age 87)

Sport
- Sport: Sports shooting

Hajime Watanuki (綿貫 甫, Watanuki Hajime; born 30 April 1939) is a Japanese former sports shooter. He competed in the 300 metre rifle event at the 1964 Summer Olympics.
