= Mario Zanin (cyclist) =

Italian cyclist (born 1940)

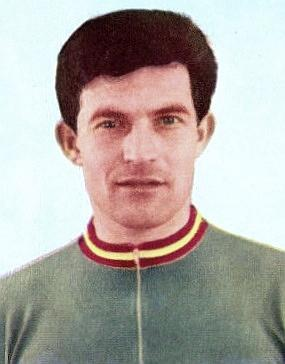
- Mario Zanin, Olympic champion at the Tokyo Games in 1964.

Personal information
- Born: 3 July 1940 (age 86) Santa Lucia di Piave, Italy
- Height: 1.74 m (5 ft 9 in)
- Weight: 74 kg (163 lb)

Cycling career
- Sport: Cycling
- Current team: Retired
- Role: Rider
Medal record
Representing Italy
Olympic Games
Gold medal – first place	1964 Tokyo	Individual road race

Mario Zanin (born 3 July 1940) is a former Italian cyclist who won a gold medal at the 1964 Olympics in the individual road race. After that he turned professional and in 1966 won one stage of the Vuelta a España. He retired in 1968.
