= Hamid Supaat =

Malaysian cyclist

Personal information
- Born: 11 November 1944 (age 81) Colony of Singapore

Cycling career
- Sport: Cycling

Abdul Hamid bin Supaat (born 11 November 1944) is a Malaysian former cyclist. He competed in the individual road race at the 1964 Summer Olympics, but did not finish.
