= Kunio Maruyama =

Kunio Maruyama (Japanese: 丸山 邦雄, June 2, 1903 – October 17, 1981) was a Japanese businessman, adventurer, and college professor of English and economics. He was one of the three Japanese men who were secretly sent from Xinjing's Japanese Society, that led to the successful repatriation of most of the 1.6 million Japanese who had been trapped in the former Manchukuo at the end of World War II.

== Early life ==
He was born in Yanagihara Village, now part of Iiyama, Nagano Prefecture, in 1903. He went a local high school there, and graduated from Meiji University, Tokyo, in 1930, with a major in law. He further studied at the University of Puget Sound, George Washington University, and Columbia University, from which universities he received BA and MA degrees.

He left the US in 1937 and visited Europe, returning to Japan in 1938.

== Working in Manchukuo ==
Like many adventurous young Japanese at that time, Kunio left Japan and sought his career in Manchukuo, that Japan had established in 1931. He worked in the planning and education departments of Showa Steel Works (昭和製鋼所), Anshan, which is now the main plant of Ansteel Group (Chinese: 鞍钢股份有限公司).

== Arranging Repatriation of Over One Million Japanese ==
When World War II ended in 1945, about 1.6 million Japanese people were left in Manchuria, most of which was nominally under the Chinese Communist control, but actually occupied by the Soviet Army. In 1946, Kunio, then 42 years old, and two younger men were chosen by the All-Manchuria Japanese Society (Tatsunosuke Takasaki, President), to deliver secretly a plea to the Japanese Government for repatriation. Three men independently reached Japan, Kunio having left his family in Dalian in association with Dalian Catholic Church (Father Lane) and escaped Manchuria via Huludao Port, which was still under the Chinese Nationalist control.

Once in Japan, the reply of Kijuro Shidehara's government, however, was that little can be done because of the confusion in the post-war Japan. Kunio through his friends' introduction met General Douglas MacArthur, who was the Supreme Commander for the Allied Powers, and his staff. They immediately sensed a possible human calamity if 1.6 million people were left to hunger and marauding in Manchuria, and started the triangular operation of transshipment among Shanghai, Huludao and Fukuoka. This operation is now known in Japan as the Great Japanese Repatriation from Huludao 1946–48.

Kunio's effort to push for the repatriation did not end with simply delivering a message to the Supreme Commander. He further negotiated with other people and organizations, including the staff of the Allied Forces and the Ministry of Foreign Affairs of Shigeru Yoshida who would become Japan's next premier, and Father Byrne who advised on General MacArthur. He also published a few books on the need and results of the repatriation.

== Teaching in Colleges ==
From 1953, he taught English and Economics at Meiji University, his alma mater. In 1964, he did economic research at both University of Glasgow and University of Edinburgh. After Meiji University's mandatory retirement in 1969, he taught at Teikyo University.

Kunio Maruyama died in Tokyo in 1981.

== Personal life ==
Kunio was married to Mary Takeda, his sweetheart from his University of Puget Sound days. Both were Christians. Between them were born six children: four sons and two daughters. His third son, Paul K. Maruyama (丸山邦昭), was an Olympian of the U.S. Judo Team.

== NHK TV Drama ==
NHK, the semi-Japanese Government TV-Radio network, announced in September 2017 that Kunio Maruyama's life will be broadcast on March 24 and 30, 9:00 pm, as a Special Drama Series called A Country Which Exists Nowhere (どこにもない国), with Seiyo Uchino playing the title role of Kunio.
