= Choy Mow Thim =

Malaysian cyclist (born 1947)

Thim Choy
Personal information
- Full name: Choy Mow Thim
- Born: 29 May 1947 (age 79) IPOH, PERAK, Malaysia
- Height: 165 cm (5 ft 5 in)
- Weight: 73 kg (161 lb)

Cycling career
- Sport: Cycling

Choy Mow Thim (born 29 May 1947) is a Malaysian former cyclist. He competed in the team time trial and the team pursuit events at the 1964 Summer Olympics.
