= Chan Pancharut =

Thai sports shooter

Personal information
- Born: 26 May 1942 (age 84)

Sport
- Sport: Sports shooting

Chan Pancharut (born 26 May 1942) is a Thai former sports shooter. He competed in the 300 metre rifle event at the 1964 Summer Olympics.
