= Brian Dalton (judoka) =

Australian judoka

Personal information
- Nationality: Australian
- Born: 5 July 1935 (age 89)

Sport
- Sport: Judo

Brian Dalton (born 5 July 1935) is an Australian judoka. He competed in the men's lightweight event at the 1964 Summer Olympics.
