= Michael Andrew (cyclist) =

Malaysian cyclist (born 1943)

Personal information
- Born: 27 September 1943 (age 83)

Cycling career
- Sport: Cycling

Michael Andrew (born 27 September 1943) is a former Malaysian cyclist. He competed in the individual road race at the 1964 Summer Olympics, but did not finish.
