= Takehide Nakatani =

Japanese judoka (born 1941)

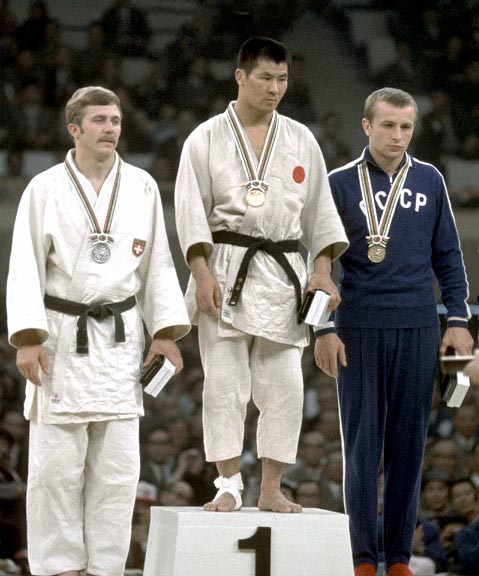
- Takehide Nakatani (center) at the 1964 Olympics

Personal information
- Born: 9 July 1941 (age 84) Hiroshima, Japan
- Occupation: Judoka
- Height: 1.65 m (5 ft 5 in)

Sport
- Country: Japan
- Sport: Judo
- Weight class: ‍–‍68 kg, ‍–‍70 kg

Achievements and titles
- Olympic Games: (gold) (1964)
- World Champ.: (bronze) (1967)
Medal record
Men's judo
Representing Japan
Olympic Games
Gold medal – first place	1964 Tokyo	‍–‍68 kg
World Championships
Bronze medal – third place	1967 Salt Lake City	‍–‍70 kg

Profile at external databases
- IJF: 54606
- JudoInside.com: 5441
- Updated on 24 June 2023

Takehide Nakatani (中谷 雄英, Nakatani Takehide; born 9 July 1941) is a retired judoka who won the first gold medal ever awarded in judo at the Summer Olympics as the Japanese competitor in the lightweight division (‍–‍68 kg).

== Biography ==
Nakatani was born in Hiroshima, Japan, into a family where all four of his brothers held a black belt in judo. Nakatani himself began judo at age 12, and quickly became known for his balanced style of judo and deadly Kosoto Gari. He chose to advance to Meiji University, but was unable to become a member of the group team because of the university's star-studded roster, which included future professional wrestler Seiji Sakaguchi. He was chosen to represent Japan in the -68 kg division of the 1964 Summer Olympics only a few days prior to the commencement of the Olympic games, and won every single one of his matches by ippon to capture the first gold medal awarded in judo in Olympic history. He spent a total of less than 9 minutes on the Olympic stage to win his three matches.

Nakatani worked at a division of Mitsubishi for 5 years after graduating from Meiji University. He then became the head coach of the West Germany national judo team for 3 years prior to the 1972 Summer Olympics held in Munich, coaching Olympic medalists Paul Barth and Klaus Glahn. He returned to Hiroshima in 1973, and continued his family's jewelry business while serving as an advisor to the All-Japan Judo Federation and Hiroshima Prefecture Judo Federation. He received a Blue Ribbon Medal of Honor from the Japanese government in 2003.

== Honours ==
- Person of Cultural Merit (2021)

== See also ==
- List of judoka
- List of Olympic medalists in judo
