= Norio Hotogi =

Japanese cyclist (born 1943)

Personal information
- Born: 20 November 1943 (age 82)
- Height: 168 cm (5 ft 6 in)
- Weight: 63 kg (139 lb)

Cycling career
- Sport: Cycling

Norio Hotogi (罐 範男, Hotogi Norio; born 20 November 1943) is a former Japanese cyclist. He competed in the team pursuit at the 1964 Summer Olympics.
