= Yoshio Shimura =

Japanese cyclist

Personal information
- Born: 23 September 1940 (age 86)
- Height: 168 cm (5 ft 6 in)
- Weight: 65 kg (143 lb)

Cycling career
- Sport: Cycling

Yoshio Shimura (志村 義夫, Shimura Yoshio; born 23 September 1940) is a former Japanese cyclist. He competed in the team time trial at the 1964 Summer Olympics.
