= Akbar Poudeh =

Iranian cyclist

Personal information
- Born: 13 March 1932
- Died: 23 June 2012 (aged 80)

Cycling career
- Sport: Cycling

Akbar Poudeh (Persian: اکبر پوده, 13 March 1932 – 23 June 2012) was an Iranian cyclist. He competed in the individual road race and team time trial events at the 1964 Summer Olympics.
