= Ronnie Theseira =

Malaysian fencer (1930–2022)

Personal information
- Nationality: Malaysian
- Born: Ronnie Ignatius Theseira; 17 May 1930 Malacca City, Straits Settlements
- Died: 18 June 2022 (aged 92) Malacca City, Malacca, Malaysia

Sport
- Country: Malaysia
- Sport: Fencing

Ronnie Ignatius Theseira (17 May 1930 – 18 June 2022) was a founder of the Malaysian Fencing Federation, Malaysian Fencing Masters Association, and a Malaysian fencing Olympian. He competed in the individual foil, épée, and sabre events at the 1964 Summer Olympics.
