= Choijiljavyn Samand =

Mongolian cyclist (born 1937)

Personal information
- Born: 4 February 1937 (age 89)
- Height: 1.68 m (5 ft 6 in)

Cycling career
- Sport: Cycling

Choijiljavyn Samand (born 4 February 1937) is a former Mongolian cyclist. He competed in the individual road race and team time trial events at the 1964 Summer Olympics.
