= Zain Safar-ud-Din =

Malaysian cyclist (1938–2023)

Personal information
- Full name: Safaruddin Mohd Zain
- Born: 22 March 1938 George Town, Penang, Straits Settlements
- Died: 20 June 2023 (aged 85)

Cycling career
- Sport: Cycling

Safaruddin Mohd Zain (22 March 1938 – 20 June 2023) was a Malaysian cyclist. He competed in the individual road race at the 1964 Summer Olympics. He did not finish the race and had to stop after 7 laps.

Safar-ud-Din died on 20 June 2023, at the age of 85.
