= Turong Tousvasu =

Thai sports shooter

Personal information
- Born: 4 September 1930

Sport
- Sport: Sports shooting

Turong Tousvasu (born 4 September 1930) is a Thai former sports shooter. He competed in the 300 metre rifle event at the 1964 Summer Olympics.
