= Pakdi Chillananda =

Thai cyclist

Personal information
- Born: 14 August 1946 (age 80)

Cycling career
- Sport: Cycling

Pakdi Chillananda (born 14 August 1946) is a Thai former cyclist. He competed in the individual road race at the 1964 Summer Olympics.
