= Luvsangiin Erkhemjamts =

Mongolian cyclist (born 1943)

Personal information
- Born: 18 January 1943 (age 83)

Cycling career
- Sport: Cycling

Luvsangiin Erkhemjamts (born 18 January 1943) is a former Mongolian cyclist. He competed in the individual road race and team time trial events at the 1964 Summer Olympics.
