= Bart Zoet =

Dutch cyclist

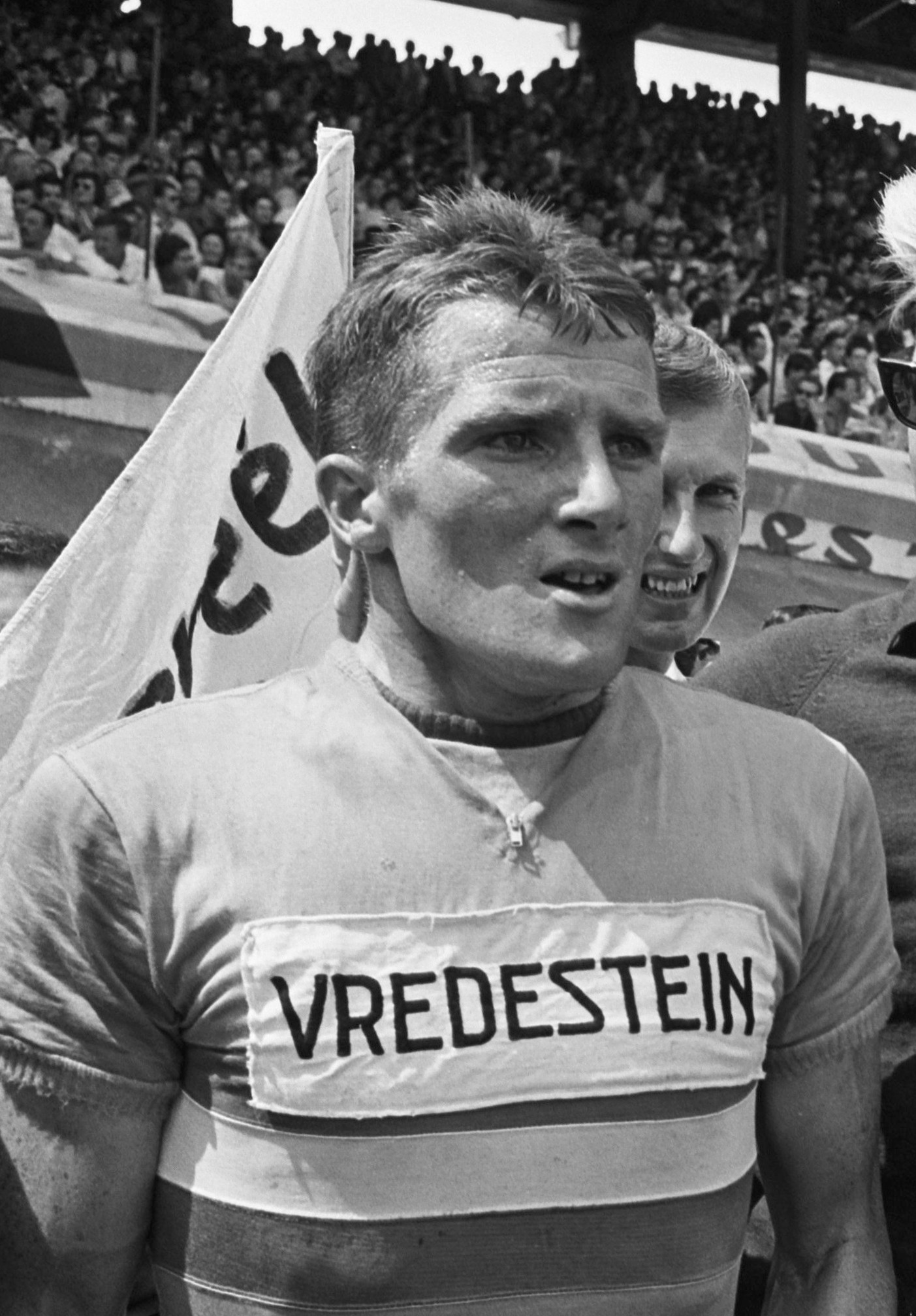
- Bart Zoet in 1964

Personal information
- Born: 20 October 1942 Sassenheim, the Netherlands
- Died: 13 May 1992 (aged 49) Sassenheim, the Netherlands
- Height: 1.76 m (5 ft 9 in)
- Weight: 77 kg (170 lb)

Sport
- Sport: Cycling
Medal record
Representing the Netherlands
Olympic Games
Gold medal – first place	1964 Tokyo	Team time trial

Hubertus Balthazar "Bart" Zoet (20 October 1942 – 13 May 1992) was a Dutch cyclist who was active between 1961 and 1969. He competed at the 1964 Summer Olympics and won the gold medal in the 100 km team time trial, alongside Gerben Karstens, Evert Dolman, and Jan Pieterse; he finished 20th in the individual road race. Next year he won the Grote 1-MeiPrijs.

Zoet died of a heart attack, which was induced by depression, alcoholism and hereditary heart disease.

== See also ==
- List of Dutch Olympic cyclists
