= Lkhamjavyn Dekhlee =

Mongolian sports shooter (born 1937)

Personal information
- Born: 20 August 1937 (age 88)

Sport
- Sport: Sports shooting

Lkhamjavyn Dekhlee (born 20 August 1937) is a Mongolian former sports shooter. He competed in the 300 metre rifle event at the 1964 Summer Olympics.
