= Arulraj Rosli =

Malaysian cyclist

Personal information
- Born: 26 October 1940
- Died: 22 May 2016 (aged 75)

Cycling career
- Sport: Cycling

Arulraj Rosli (26 October 1940 – 22 May 2016) was a Malaysian cyclist. He competed in the team time trial and the team pursuit events at the 1964 Summer Olympics.
