= Mashallah Amin Sorour =

Iranian cyclist (1931–2010)

Personal information
- Born: 16 March 1931
- Died: 9 October 2010 (aged 79)

Cycling career
- Sport: Cycling

Mashallah Amin Sorour (Persian: ماشالله امین سرور; 16 March 1931 – 9 October 2010) was an Iranian cyclist. He competed in the individual road race and team time trial events at the 1964 Summer Olympics.
