= Esmaeil Hosseini =

Iranian cyclist

Seyed Esmaeil Hosseini
Personal information
- Born: 2 April 1942 (age 84)

Cycling career
- Sport: Cycling
Medal record
Representing Iran
Men's track cycling and road cycling
Asian Games
Bronze medal – third place	1966 Bangkok	Individual pursuit
Bronze medal – third place	1966 Bangkok	Team time trial

Seyed Esmaeil Hosseini (Persian: سید اسماعیل حسینی, born 2 April 1942) is a former Iranian cyclist. He competed in the individual road race and team time trial events at the 1964 Summer Olympics.
