= Shigeo Maruyama (engineer) =

Shigeo Maruyama (丸山 茂夫, Maruyama Shigeo) is a Japanese professor of mechanical engineering at the University of Tokyo who has published almost 1,000 articles, which have appeared in such journals as the Chemical Physics and Optics Letters, along with Physical Review B and many others. His most cited paper is Low-temperature synthesis of high-purity single-walled carbon nanotubes from alcohol which have over 9840 citations as of 2014. He is currently the president of the Fullerenes, Nanotubes and Graphene Research Society.
