= Nguyễn Văn Bình (judoka) =

Vietnamese judoka

Personal information
- Born: 1939 (age 86–87) Hanoi, Vietnam

Nguyễn Văn Bình (born December 1, 1939) is a Vietnamese former judoka. He was a judo competitor for South Vietnam during the 1964 Olympic Games in Tokyo, Japan.

He started training in judo in 1953 and would become a national champ by the year 1956 under Cu Ton.

He competed at the age of 24, and would place 19th in the Men's lightweight division. He would become a 7th degree black belt in Judo.

In 1962 he started to study Taekwon-do. This was under Nam Tae Hi who was a Korean military instructor as part of the initial group of officers in the South Vietnamese Army. He was able to study under and work with Taekwon-do's founder General Choi Hong Hi starting 1967. He would establish 9 schools of martial arts in Vietnam and teach over 60,000 students before the Fall of Saigon in 1975. He would later earn a 9th degree blackbelt in Taekwondo, and operates a school with his family in Houston Texas teaching Taekwon-do, Judo, Aikido and Tai Chi. He is the President of ITF-USA and has supported the younger generation of Taekwon-do instructors in Texas and across the United States through seminars, examinations, administrative advice and continued leadership.

== See also ==
- List of taekwondo grandmasters
