= Udom Ratsamelongkorn =

Thai judoka

Personal information
- Nationality: Thai
- Born: 3 November 1944 (age 80)

Sport
- Sport: Judo

Udom Ratsamelongkorn (born 3 November 1944) is a Thai judoka. He competed in the men's lightweight event at the 1964 Summer Olympics.
