= Tjow Choon Boon =

Malaysian cyclist

Personal information
- Born: 3 June 1945 (age 81)

Cycling career
- Sport: Cycling

Tjow Choon Boon (born 3 June 1945) is a Malaysian former cyclist. He competed in the team time trial and the individual pursuit events at the 1964 Summer Olympics.
