= Eric Hänni =

Swiss judoka (1938–2024)

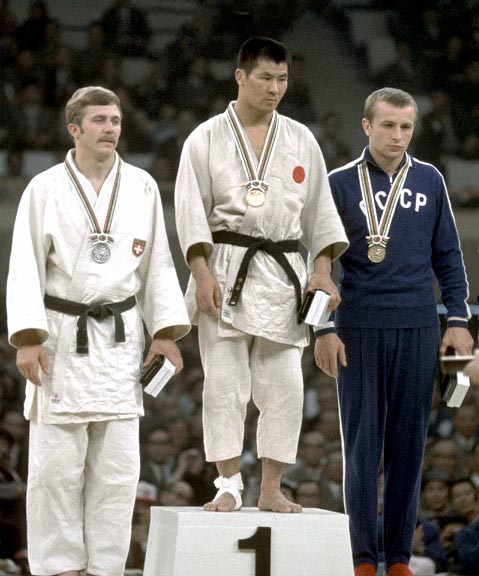
- Eric Hänni (left) at the 1964 Olympics

Personal information
- Born: 19 December 1938 Delémont, Jura, Switzerland
- Died: 25 December 2024 (aged 86)
- Occupation: Judoka
- Height: 1.65 m (5 ft 5 in)

Sport
- Country: Switzerland
- Sport: Judo
- Weight class: ‍–‍68 kg, ‍–‍80 kg
- Rank: 9th dan black belt

Achievements and titles
- Olympic Games: (silver) (1964)
- World Champ.: R16 (1971)
- European Champ.: (bronze) (1964)
Medal record
Men's judo
Representing Switzerland
Olympic Games
Silver medal – second place	1964 Tokyo	‍–‍68 kg
European Championships
Bronze medal – third place	1964 Berlin	ama ‍–‍68 kg

Profile at external databases
- IJF: 54621
- JudoInside.com: 6149
- Updated on 24 June 2023

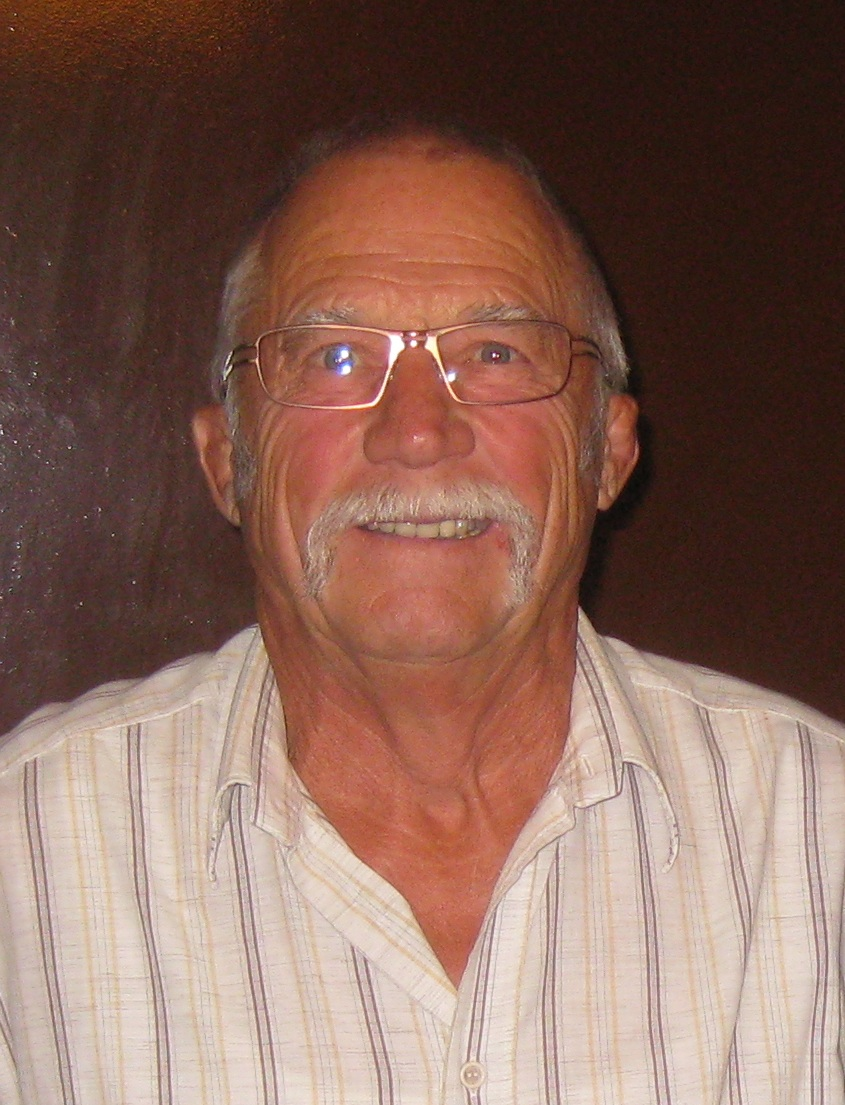
Eric Hänni in 2011

Eric Hänni (19 December 1938 – 25 December 2024) was a Swiss judoka who competed between 1959 and 1974. In 1964 he won an Olympic silver medal and a European bronze medal in the lightweight category. During his career Hänni won seven individual national titles (1959, 1962, 1964, 1965, 1969–71) and took part in twelve European and three World Championships.

Hänni's parents divorced before he was ten, and Hänni lived with his uncle in Bern. He then moved to Canton of Jura where he worked as a mechanic. Besides competing in judo, he also acted as a referee, at the national (since 1965), European (since 1974) and world level (since 1985). In 1966 he started coaching judo, first in Zurich and between 1967 and 1972 at Nippon Bern. In 1972 he opened his own judo club in his native Delémont, which he ran until 1995. In parallel, he trained the national junior and senior teams and acted as vice-president of the Swiss Judo Association. In 2014, he became the first Swiss judoka to receive an honorary 9th dan.

Hänni was married with two children. He was a fan of motorcycle racing, in which he competed at the national level. Hänni died on 25 December 2024, at the age of 86.
