= Suwan Ornkerd =

Thai cyclist

Personal information
- Born: 12 May 1941 (age 85)
- Height: 167 cm (5 ft 6 in)
- Weight: 73 kg (161 lb)

Cycling career
- Sport: Cycling

Suwan Ornkerd (born 12 May 1941) is a former Thai cyclist. He competed in the team time trial at the 1964 Summer Olympics.
