= Kerepes =

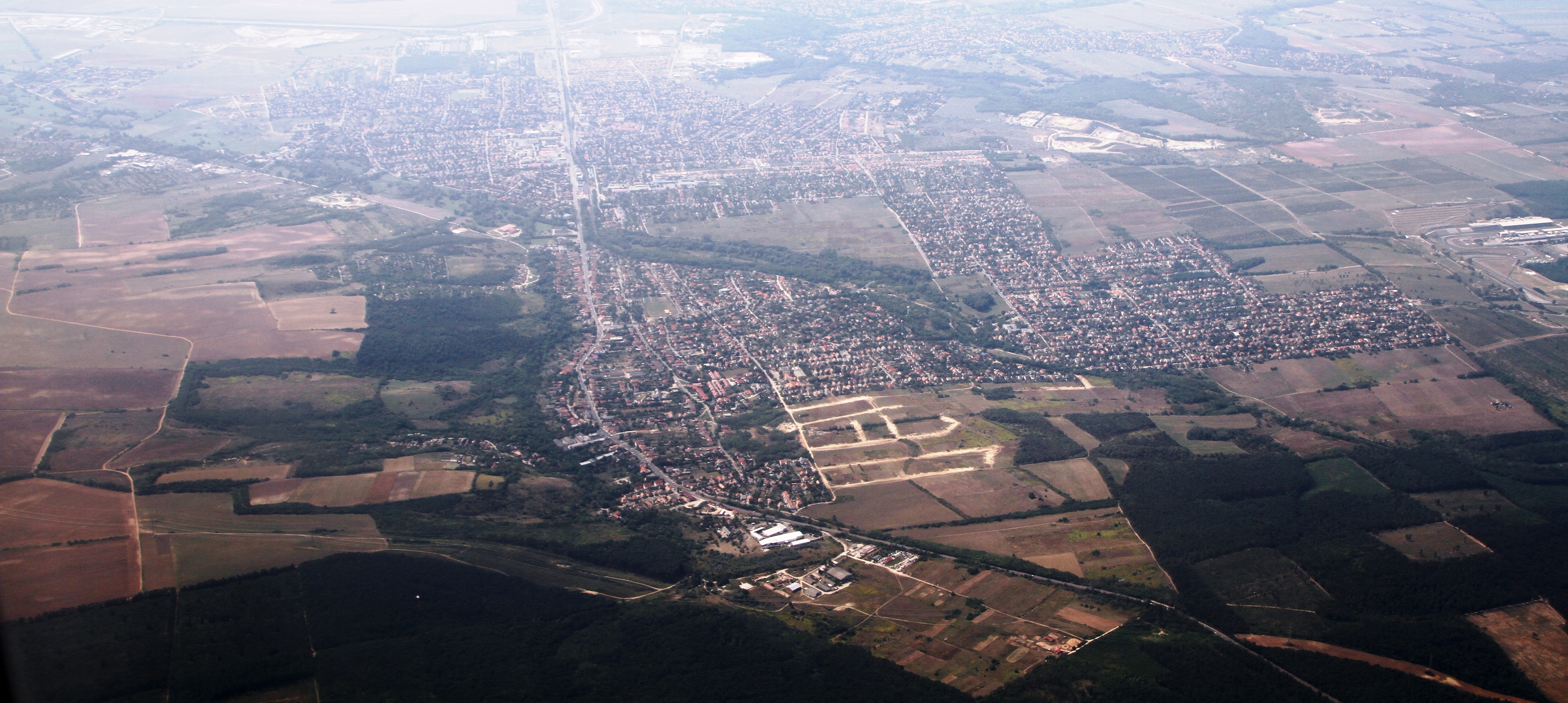

- Flag Coat of arms

- Location of Kerepes in Hungary
- Coordinates: 47.56048°N 19.28323°E
- Country: Hungary
- Region: Central Hungary
- County: Pest
- District: Gödöllő

Government
  - Mayor: Gyuricza László (Fidesz-KDNP)

Area
  - Total: 24.07 km^{2} (9.29 sq mi)

Population (2017)
  - Total: 9,968
  - Density: 414.1/km^{2} (1,073/sq mi)
- Time zone: UTC+1 (CET)
  - Summer (DST): UTC+2 (CEST)
- Postal code: 2144
- Area code: +36 28
- KSH code: 34166
- Website: www.kerepes.hu

Kerepes is a village in Pest county, Budapest metropolitan area, Hungary. It has a population of 9,903 (2008).

== Notable people ==
- Zoltán Sándor (born 1928), sports shooter

== Twin towns – sister cities ==
Kerepes is twinned with:

- Dealu, Romania
- Dolné Obdokovce, Slovakia
- Hořice, Czech Republic
- Pabianice, Poland
