= Takehisa Kato =

Japanese cyclist

Personal information
- Born: 8 December 1941 (age 84)
- Height: 167 cm (5 ft 6 in)
- Weight: 60 kg (132 lb)

Cycling career
- Sport: Cycling

Takehisa Kato (加藤武久, Katō Takehisa; born 8 December 1941) is a former Japanese cyclist. He competed in the team time trial at the 1964 Summer Olympics.
