= Hiroshi Yamao =

Japanese cyclist

Personal information
- Born: 10 December 1943 (age 82)

Cycling career
- Sport: Cycling

Hiroshi Yamao (山尾 裕, Yamao Hiroshi; born 10 December 1943) is a former Japanese cyclist. He competed in the individual road race at the 1964 Summer Olympics.
