= Yanjingiin Baatar =

Mongolian cyclist (born 1940)

Personal information
- Born: 3 August 1940 (age 86)

Cycling career
- Sport: Cycling

Yanjingiin Baatar (born 3 August 1940) is a former Mongolian cyclist. He competed in the individual road race and team time trial events at the 1964 Summer Olympics.
