= List of Hong Kong records in track cycling =

The following are the national records in track cycling in Hong Kong by Hong Kong's national cycling federation: Hong Kong Cycling Association (HKCA).

== Men ==
Event	Record	Athlete	Date	Meet	Place	Ref
Flying 200 m time trial	9.708	To Cheuk Hei	16 March 2025	Nations Cup	Konya, Turkey	
250 m time trial (standing start)	17.890	Mok Tsz Chun	29 September 2026	Asian Games	Izu, Japan	
500 m time trial	32.664	Law Tsz Chun	18 February 2018	Asian Championships	Nilai, Malaysia	
1 km time trial	1:01.558	Yung Tsun Ho	19 June 2023	Asian Championships	Nilai, Malaysia	
Team sprint	43.507	Mok Tsz Chun; To Cheuk Hei; Yung Tsun Ho	29 September 2026	Asian Games	Izu, Japan	
4000m individual pursuit	4:12.813	Ng Pak Hang	16 October 2026	World Championships	Shanghai, China	
4000m team pursuit	3:57.641	Chu Tsun Wai; Mow Ching Yin; Ng Pak Hang; Tso Kai Kwong	29 September 2026	Asian Games	Izu, Japan	

== Women ==
Event	Record	Athlete	Date	Meet	Place	Ref
Flying 200 m time trial	10.387	Lee Wai Sze	14 December 2019	World Cup	Brisbane, Australia	
250 m time trial (standing start)	19.200	Lee Wai Sze	6 December 2013	World Cup	Aguascalientes, Mexico	
500 m time trial	33.296	Lee Wai Sze	6 December 2013	World Cup	Aguascalientes, Mexico	
500 m time trial (sea level)	33.395	Lee Wai Sze	17 February 2018	Asian Championships	Nilai, Malaysia	
1 km time trial	1:07.937	Phoebe Tung	31 March 2026	Asian Championships	Tagaytay, Philippines	
Team sprint (500 m)	33.484	Ma Wing Yu; Lee Wai Sze	27 August 2018	Asian Games	Jakarta, Indonesia	
Team sprint (750 m)	49.308	Yeung Cho Yiu; Phoebe Tung; Ng Sze Wing	25 March 2026	Asian Championships	Tagaytay, Philippines	
3000 m individual pursuit	3:42.420	Leung Bo Yee	16 June 2023	Asian Championships	Nilai, Malaysia	
4000m individual pursuit	4:54.674	Leung Wing Yee	28 March 2026	Asian Championships	Tagaytay, Philippines	
3000 m team pursuit						
4000 m team pursuit	4:23.332	Leung Wing Yee; Leung Bo Yee; Lee Sze Wing; Kwan Tsz Kwan	25 March 2026	Asian Championships	Tagaytay, Philippines	
