= Taworn Jirapan =

Thai cyclist (1939–2014)

Personal information
- Born: 1 April 1939
- Died: 22 July 2014 (aged 75)

Cycling career
- Sport: Cycling

Taworn Jirapan (1 April 1939 – 22 July 2014) was a Thai cyclist. He competed in the individual road race and team time trial events at the 1964 Summer Olympics.
