= Vitool Charernratana =

Thai cyclist (born 1942)

Personal information
- Born: 11 September 1942 (age 84)

Cycling career
- Sport: Cycling

Vitool Charernratana (born 11 September 1942) is a former Thai cyclist. He competed in the individual road race and team time trial events at the 1964 Summer Olympics.
