= Stephen Lim =

Malaysian cyclist (born 1942)

Personal information
- Born: 18 October 1942 (age 83)

Cycling career
- Sport: Cycling

Stephen Lim (born 18 October 1942) is a Malaysian former cyclist. He competed in the individual road race at the 1964 Summer Olympics, finishing in 72nd place.
