= Chow Kwong Choi =

Hong Kong cyclist

Personal information
- Native name
- Traditional Chinese: 周光才
- Simplified Chinese: 周光才
Transcriptions
Standard Mandarin
- Hanyu Pinyin: Zhōu Guāngcái
- Wade–Giles: Chou¹ Kuang¹-ts'ai²
Yue: Cantonese
- Jyutping: Zau1 Gwong1 Coi4
- Born: 3 December 1943 (age 81)

Sport
- Sport: Cycling

Chow Kwong Choi (Chinese: 周光才; born 3 December 1943) is a former Hong Kong cyclist. He competed in three events at the 1964 Summer Olympics. He is the twin brother of fellow former cyclist Chow Kwong Man.

Around 1959, Chow began to participate in competitive cycling. He received a bronze medal at the 1961 Asian Cycling Championships. According to Carl Myatt of the South China Morning Post, his "success had the desired effect of catapulting the youthful Hong Kong Cycling Association—it was formed in 1960—into international prominence". Chow competed in the 1965 Asian Cycling Championships.
