= Masashi Omiya =

Japanese cyclist (born 1938)

Personal information
- Born: 10 March 1938 (age 88) Iwate, Japan

Cycling career
- Sport: Cycling

Masashi Omiya (大宮 政志, Ōmiya Masashi; born 10 March 1938) is a former Japanese cyclist. He competed at the 1960 Summer Olympics and the 1964 Summer Olympics.
