= South Korea at the 1964 Summer Olympics =

- IOC code: KOR
- NOC: Korean Olympic Committee

in Tokyo
- Competitors: 154 (128 men and 26 women) in 17 sports
- Medals Ranked 27th: Gold 0 Silver 2 Bronze 1 Total 3

Summer Olympics appearances (overview)
- 1948; 1952; 1956; 1960; 1964; 1968; 1972; 1976; 1980; 1984; 1988; 1992; 1996; 2000; 2004; 2008; 2012; 2016; 2020; 2024; 2028

South Korea, as Korea, competed at the 1964 Summer Olympics in Tokyo, Japan. 154 competitors, 128 men and 26 women, took part in 93 events in 17 sports.

== Medals ==
| Medal | Name | Sport | Event | Date |
|---|---|---|---|---|
| Silver | Chung Shin-cho | Boxing | Men's bantamweight | 23 October |
| Silver | Chang Chang-sun | Wrestling | Men's freestyle flyweight | 14 October |
| Bronze | Kim Eui-tae | Judo | Men's 80kg | 21 October |

== Cycling ==
Six cyclists represented South Korea in 1964.

Individual road race

- Lee Seon-bae
- An Byeong-hun
- Hwang Chang-sik
- Wi Gyeong-yong

Team time trial

- An Byeong-hun
- Jo Seong-hwan
- Hong Seong-ik
- Lee Seon-bae

== Diving ==
Men

| Athlete | Event | Preliminary | | Final | | | |
| Athlete | Event | Points | Rank | Points | Rank | Total | Rank |
|---|---|---|---|---|---|---|---|
| Song Jae-ung | 3 m springboard | 75.10 | 23 | Did not advance | | | |
| Jo Chang-je | 10 m platform | 84.02 | 22 | Did not advance | | | |
| Song Jae-ung | 10 m platform | 81.72 | 26 | Did not advance | | | |

Women

| Athlete | Event | Preliminary | | Final | | | |
| Athlete | Event | Points | Rank | Points | Rank | Total | Rank |
|---|---|---|---|---|---|---|---|
| Jeong Sun-ja | 10 m platform | 33.57 | 24 | Did not advance | | | |

== Fencing ==
Five fencers, four men and one woman, represented South Korea in 1964.

Men's foil

- Sin Du-ho
- Kim Man-sig
- Han Myeong-seok

Men's team foil

- Sin Du-ho, Han Myeong-seok, Kim Man-sig, Kim Chang-hwan

Men's épée

- Sin Du-ho
- Han Myeong-seok
- Kim Man-sig

Men's team épée

- Sin Du-ho, Kim Chang-hwan, Han Myeong-seok, Kim Man-sig

Women's foil

- Sin Gwang-suk

== Modern pentathlon ==
One male pentathlete represented South Korea in 1964.

Individual competition

- Choi Gwi-seung — 2809 points (37th place)

== Shooting ==
Ten shooters represented South Korea in 1964.

Open

| Athlete | Event | Final | |
| Athlete | Event | Points | Rank |
|---|---|---|---|
| Seo Gang-uk | 50 m pistol | 527 | 32 |
| Sin Hyeon-ju | 300 m rifle, three positions | 1086 | 22 |
| Sin Hyeon-ju | 50 m rifle, three positions | 1097 | 41 |
| Chu Hwa-il | 50 m rifle prone | 586 | 40 |
| An Jae-song | 50 m pistol | 548 | 9 |
| An Jeong-geun | Trap | 186 | 23 |
| Lee Jong-hyeon | 25 m pistol | 565 | 39 |
| Park Nam-kyu | 25 m pistol | 552 | 46 |
| Park Sam-gyu | Trap | 181 | 35 |
| Nam Sang-wan | 300 m rifle, three positions | 1091 | 21 |
| Heo Uk-bong | 50 m rifle, three positions | 1103 | 37 |
| Heo Uk-bong | 50 m rifle prone | 574 | 65 |

== Swimming ==
Men

| Athlete | Event | Heat | | Semifinal | | Final | |
| Athlete | Event | Time | Rank | Time | Rank | Time | Rank |
|---|---|---|---|---|---|---|---|
| Kim Bong-jo | 100 m freestyle | 1:01.2 | 64 | Did not advance | | | |
| Kim Bong-jo | 400 m freestyle | 4:55.8 | 47 | —N/a | | Did not advance | |
| Jin Jang-rim | 200 m breaststroke | 2:48.6 | 29 | Did not advance | | | |

Women

| Athlete | Event | Heat | | Semifinal | | Final | |
| Athlete | Event | Time | Rank | Time | Rank | Time | Rank |
|---|---|---|---|---|---|---|---|
| Im Geum-ja | 100 m freestyle | 1:16.1 | 44 | Did not advance | | | |
| Im Geum-ja | 400 m freestyle | 5:38.7 | 30 | —N/a | | Did not advance | |
| Jeon Ok-ja | 100 m backstroke | 1:21.7 | 31 | —N/a | | Did not advance | |

== Volleyball ==
Men's Team Competition

- Round Robin

- Lost to Japan (0-3)
- Lost to United States (2-3)
- Lost to Soviet Union (0-3)
- Lost to Brazil (1-3)
- Lost to Romania (2-3)
- Lost to Netherlands (1-3)
- Lost to Bulgaria (1-3)
- Lost to Hungary (2-3)
- Lost to Czechoslovakia (0-3) → Tenth place

- Team Roster

- Kim In-soo
- Oh Pyong-kil
- Sohn Young-wan
- Chung Sun-hung
- Park Suh-kwang
- Suh Ban-suk
- Lee Kyu-soh
- Kim Young-joon
- Kim Sung-kil
- Kim Kwang-soo
- Kim Jin-hee
- Lim Tae-hoh

Women's Team Competition

- Round Robin

- Lost to Soviet Union (0-3)
- Lost to Poland (0-3)
- Lost to Japan (0-3)
- Lost to Romania (0-3)
- Lost to United States (0-3) → Sixth and last place

- Team Roster

- Suh Choon-kang
- Moon Kyung-sook
- Ryoo Choon-ja
- Kim Kil-ja
- Oh Soon-ok
- Chung Jong-uen
- Choi Don-hi
- Hong Nam-sun
- Oh Chung-ja
- Yoon Jung-sook
- Kwak Ryong-ja
- Lee Keun-soo
