= Volleyball at the 1964 Summer Olympics – Women's team rosters =

List of volleyball players

The following volleyball players took part in the women's tournament at the 1964 Summer Olympics.

== Rosters ==
=== Japan ===
- Masae Kasai (c)
- Emiko Miyamoto
- Kinuko Tanida
- Yuriko Handa
- Yoshiko Matsumura
- Sata Isobe
- Katsumi Matsumura
- Yoko Shinozaki
- Setsuko Sasaki
- Yuko Fujimoto
- Masako Kondo
- Ayano Shibuki

Head coach

- Hirofumi Daimatsu

=== Poland ===
- Krystyna Czajkowska
- Maria Golimowska
- Krystyna Jakubowska
- Danuta Kordaczuk
- Krystyna Krupa
- Józefa Ledwig
- Jadwiga Marko
- Jadwiga Rutkowska
- Maria Śliwka
- Zofia Szczęśniewska
- Hanna Busz
- Barbara Hermel

Head coach

- Stanisław Poburka

=== Romania ===
- Ana Mocanu
- Cornelia Lăzeanu
- Natalia Todorovschi
- Doina Ivănescu
- Doina Popescu
- Sonia Colceru
- Lia Vanea
- Alexandrina Chezan
- Ileana Enculescu
- Elisabeta Goloşie
- Marina Stanca

Head coach

=== South Korea ===
- Seo Chun-gang
- Mun Gyeong-suk
- Yu Chun-ja
- Kim Gil-ja
- O Sun-ok
- Jeong Jeong-eun
- Choi Don-hui
- Hong Nam-seon
- O Cheong-ja
- Yun Jeong-suk
- Gwag Yong-ja
- Lee Geun-su

Head coach

=== Soviet Union ===
- Antonina Ryzhova
- Astra Biltauere
- Ninel Lukanina
- Lyudmila Buldakova (c)
- Nelli Abramova
- Tamara Tikhonina
- Valentina Kamenek
- Inna Ryskal
- Marita Katusheva
- Tatyana Roshchina
- Valentina Mishak
- Lyudmila Gureyeva

Head coach

=== United States ===
- Jean Gaertner
- Lou Galloway
- Barbara Harwerth
- Patti Bright
- Linda Murphy
- Gail O'Rourke
- Nancy Owen
- Mary Jo Peppler
- Mary Margaret Perry
- Sharon Peterson
- Verneda Thomas
- Jane Ward

Head coach

- Doc Burroughs
