= Romania at the 1964 Summer Olympics =

- IOC code: ROU (ROM used at these Games)
- NOC: Romanian Olympic Committee

in Tokyo
- Competitors: 138 (108 men and 30 women) in 13 sports
- Flag bearer: Aurel Vernescu
- Medals Ranked 14th: Gold 2 Silver 4 Bronze 6 Total 12

Summer Olympics appearances (overview)
- 1900; 1904–1920; 1924; 1928; 1932; 1936; 1948; 1952; 1956; 1960; 1964; 1968; 1972; 1976; 1980; 1984; 1988; 1992; 1996; 2000; 2004; 2008; 2012; 2016; 2020; 2024; 2028

Romania competed at the 1964 Summer Olympics in Tokyo, Japan. 138 competitors, 108 men and 30 women, took part in 76 events in 13 sports.

== Medalists ==
Medal	Name	Sport	Event	Date
Gold				
Gold				
Silver				
Silver				
Silver				
Silver				
Bronze				
Bronze				
Bronze				
Bronze				
Bronze				
Bronze				

Medals by sport
Sport	1st place, gold medalist(s)	2nd place, silver medalist(s)	3rd place, bronze medalist(s)	Total
Athletics				
Canoeing				
Shooting				
Wrestling				
Total	2	4	6	12

Medals by gender
Gender	1st place, gold medalist(s)	2nd place, silver medalist(s)	3rd place, bronze medalist(s)	Total
Male				
Female				
Total	2	4	6	12

=== Gold ===
- Iolanda Balaș — Athletics, Women's High Jump
- Mihaela Peneș — Athletics, Women's Javelin Throw

=== Silver ===
- Andrei Igorov — Canoeing, Men's C1 1000m Canadian Singles
- Hilde Lauer — Canoeing, Women's K1 500m Kayak Singles
- Ion Tripșa — Shooting, Men's Rapid-Fire Pistol
- Valeriu Bularca — Wrestling, Men's Greco-Roman Lightweight

=== Bronze ===
- Lia Manoliu — Athletics, Women's Discus Throw
- Aurel Vernescu — Canoeing, Men's K1 1000m Kayak Singles
- Simion Cuciuc, Atanase Sciotnic, Mihai Țurcaș, and Aurel Vernescu — Canoeing, Men's K4 1000m Kayak Fours
- Hilde Lauer and Cornelia Sideri — Canoeing, Women's K2 500m Kayak Pairs
- Dumitru Pârvulescu — Wrestling, Men's Greco-Roman Flyweight
- Ion Cernea — Wrestling, Men's Greco-Roman Bantamweight

== Athletics ==
Women's High Jump

- Iolanda Balaș
- Qualification- 1.70 m
- Final:-1.90 m, OR ( Gold Medal)

Women's Discus

- Lia Manoliu
- Qualification- 53.64 m
- Final-56.94 m ( Bronze Medal)
- Olimpia Cataramă
- Qualification-53.20 m
- Final-53.08 m (8th place)

Women's Javelin

- Maria Diaconescu
- Qualification-51.12 m
- Final-53.71 m (6th place)
- Mihaela Peneș
- Qualification-51.19 m
- Final-60.54 m ( Gold Medal)

Women's Shot Put

- Ana Sălăgean
- Qualification-15.31 m not qualified(no ranking)

Women's Long Jump

- Viorica Viscopoleanu
- Qualification-6.37 m
- Final-6.35 m (5th place)

Men's 5000 m

- Andrei Barabaș
- Heat-14:00.2 not qualified (no ranking)

Marathon

- Constantin Grecescu 2:30:42.6 (36th place)

Triple Jump

- Șerban Ciochină
- Qualification-15.31 m
- Final-16.23 m (5th place)

50 km Walk

- Ilie Popa 2:19:03.0 (28th place)

== Boxing ==
Flyweight

- Constantin Ciucă def. Henry (Canada), def. Cuylenburg (Ceylon), lost to Olech (Poland)→6th place

Bantamweight

- Nicolae Puiu def. Van der Walt (Northern Rhodesia), def. Johnson (U.S.A.), lost to Sakurai (Japan)→5th place

Featherweight

- Constantin Crudu def. Caminero (Cuba), def. Limmonen (Finland), lost to Stepashkin (Soviet Union)→5th place

Light-Welterweight

- Iosif Mihalic def. König (Austria), def. Fasoli (Italy), lost to Kulej (Poland)→5th place

Welterweight

- Niculescu def. Gutierrez (Mexico), lost to Mabwa (Uganda)

Light-Middleweight

- Mârza def. Lee (South Korea), def. Elmahas (United Arab Republic), lost to Grzesiak(Poland)→7th place

Middleweight

- Ion Monea def. Kim (South Korea), lost to Schulz (Germany United Team)

Light-Heavyweight

- Gheorghe Negrea lost to Kiselyov (Soviet Union)

Heavyweight

- Vasile Mariuțan def. Pandov (Bulgaria), lost to Ros (Italy)

== Cycling ==
Five cyclists represented Romania in 1964.

Individual road race

- Gabriel Moiceanu
- Constantin Ciocan
- Ion Cosma
- Gheorghe Bădără

Team time trial

- Gheorghe Bădără
- Constantin Ciocan
- Ion Cosma
- Emil Rusu

== Fencing ==
Eleven fencers, six men and five women, represented Romania in 1964.

Women's foil

- Ana Ene-Derșidan qualified from Round 1 (2v, 2 d, barrage), qualified from Round 2 (3v,2 d), lost in Round 3 to Antonella Ragno (Italy) (8-4)
- Olga Orban-Szabo qualified from Round 1 (3 v,2 d), qualified from Round 2 (4 v, 1 d), lost in Round 3 to Giovanna Masciotta(Italy) (8-6)
- Maria Vicol eliminated in Round 1 (2 v, 3 d)

Women's team foil

- Round 1

- Defeated U.S.A. (9-1)

- Round 2

- Lost to Soviet Union (4-9)

- Playoff for 5th place

- Defeated France (9-6)→5th place

Team Roster:

- Olga Orban-Szabo
- Ana Ene-Derșidan
- Ileana Gyulai
- Ecaterina Stahl
- Maria Vicol

Men's foil

- Ion Drîmbă qualified from Round 1 (4 v, 1 d), qualified from Round 2 (3 v, 2 d), def.in Round 3 Naser Madani (Iran)(10-4), lost in Round 4 to Roland Losert (Austria)(6-10)
- Ștefan Haukler qualified from Round 1 (6 v,0 d), eliminated in Round 2 (2 v, 3 d)
- Tănase Mureșanu qualified from Round 1 (4 v,1 d), eliminated in Round 2 (2 v,3 d, barrage)

Men's team foil

- First round

- Def. Argentina (9-0)
- Def. France (9-5)
- Lost to U.S.A. (8-8,54-62 t.d.)

- Quarterfinals

- Lost to Poland (5-9)

- 5-8 Playoff

- Def. Hungary (9-5)
- Lost to Germany United Team (8-8;57-60 t.d.)→6th place

- Team Roster

- Ion Drîmbă
- Ștefan Haukler
- Tănase Mureșanu
- Iuliu Falb
- Attila Csipler

Men's épée

- Ștefan Haukler qualified from Round 1 (4 v,3 d), eliminated in Round 2 (0 v, 5 d)

Men's sabre

- Tănase Mureșanu qualified from Round 1 (6 v, 0 d), qualified from Round 2 (4 v,2 d), lost in Round 3 to Marcel Parent (France) (10-12)
- Octavian Vintilă qualified from Round 1 (3 v, 2 d), eliminated in Round 2 (1 v, 6 d)
- Ion Drîmbă qualified from Round 1 (4 v,1 d), eliminated in Round 2 (3 v, 3 d)

Men's team sabre

- Round 1

- Def. Australia (9-3)
- Def. Great Britain (10-6)

- Quarterfinals

- Lost to France (6-8)

- 5-7 playoff

- Lost to Hungary (0-9)→7th place

Team Roster

- Attila Csipler
- Octavian Vintilă
- Tănase Mureșanu
- Ion Drîmbă

== Football ==
- Group stage

- Defeated Mexico (3-1)
- Drew with Germany United Team (1-1)
- Defeated Iran (1-0)

- Quarterfinals

- Lost to Hungary (0-2)

- Consolation round 1

- Defeated Ghana (4-2)

- Consolation round 2

- Defeated Yugoslavia (3-0) → 5th place

- Team Roster

- Ilie Datcu
- Ilie Greavu
- Ion Nunweiller
- Dan Coe
- Bujor Hălmăgeanu
- Emil Petru
- Constantin Koszka
- Ion Pârcălab
- Gheorghe Constantin
- Ion Gheorghe Ionescu
- Carol Creiniceanu
- Emerich Jenei
- Cornel Pavlovici
- Marin Andrei
- Mircea Petescu
- Dumitru Ivan
- Sorin Avram
- Nicolae Georgescu

== Shooting ==
Nine shooters represented Romania in 1964.

25 m pistol

- Ion Tripșa
- Marcel Roșca

50 m pistol

- Neagu Bratu
- Gavril Maghiar

50 m rifle, three positions

- Ion Olărescu
- Nicolae Rotaru

50 m rifle, prone

- Nicolae Rotaru
- Traian Cogut

Trap

- Ion Dumitrescu
- Gheorghe Enache

== Volleyball ==
Men's Team Competition

- Round Robin

- Lost to Soviet Union (0-3)
- Defeated Brazil (3-0)
- Defeated Bulgaria (3-2)
- Defeated Netherlands (3-0)
- Defeated South Korea (3-2)
- Defeated Hungary (3-1)
- Lost to Czechoslovakia (1-3)
- Lost to Japan (0-3)
- Defeated United States (3-1) → 4th place

- Team Roster

- Gheorghe Fieraru
- Horațiu Nicolau
- Aurel Drăgan
- Iuliu Szőcs
- William Schreiber
- Mihai Grigorovici
- Davila Plocon
- Nicolae Bărbuță
- Eduard Derzsi
- Mihai Chezan
- Constantin Ganciu
- Mihai Coste

Women's Team Competition

- Round Robin

- Lost to Soviet Union (0-3)
- Lost to Japan (0-3)
- Defeated United States (3-0)
- Defeated South Korea (3-0)
- Lost to Poland (0-3) → 4th place

- Team Roster

- Ana Mocan
- Cornelia Lăzeanu
- Natalia Todorovschi
- Doina Ivănescu
- Doina Rodica Popescu
- Sonia Colceru
- Lia Vanea
- Alexandrina Chezan
- Ileana Enculescu
- Elisabeta Goloșie
- Marina Stanca

== Water polo ==
- First Round

- Lost to Italy (3-4)
- Defeated Japan (9-4)

- Semifinal Round

- Defeated Germany United Team (5-4)
- Drew with Soviet Union (2-2)
- 5-8 Tournament
- Defeated the Netherlands (6-1)
- Lost to Belgium (3-5)→ 5th place

- Team Roster

- Mircea Ștefănescu
- Anatolie Grințescu
- Aurel Zahan
- Alexandru Szabó
- Ștefan Kroner
- Cornel Mărculescu
- Nicolae Firoiu
- Gruia Novac
- Iosif Kuliniac
- Cosma Liță
- Emil Mureșanu

== Wrestling ==
Freestyle Wrestling

52 kg

- Gheorghe Tapalagă lost to Aliev(Soviet Union) (decision), lost to Georgiev (Bulgaria) (fall 9'19")

78 kg

- Ștefan Tâmpa lost to Watanabe (Japan) (decision), lost to Heinze (Germany Unified Team) (decision)

97 kg

- Ferenc Ballo lost to Medved (Soviet Union) (fall 2'12")drew with Conine (U.S.A.) (2-2)

+97 kg

- Ștefan Stângu drew with Kubat (Czechoslovakia) (2-2), lost to Dzhiber (Bulgaria) (decision)

Greco-Roman Style Wrestling

52 kg

- Dumitru Pârvulescu def. Jensen (Denmark) (decision), def. Del Rio (Mexico) (fall 2'55"), def. Savadov (Soviet Union) (decision), lost to Kerezov (Bulgaria) (decision), lost to Hanahara (Japan) (fall 8'19")(→ Bronze Medal)

57 kg

- Ion Cernea drew with Varga (Hungary) def. Knitter (Poland) (decision), def. Švec (Czechoslovakia) (decision), def. Başergil (Turkey) (decision), lost to Trestyanski (Soviet Union) (decision)(→ Bronze Medal)

63 kg

- Marin Bolocan lost to Olsson (Sweden) (decision), def. Sayed (Afghanistan) (fall 3'56"), drew with Mirmalek (Iran), lost to Mansour (United Arab Republic) (decision)

70 kg

- Valeriu Bularca drew with Tapio (Finland), def. Kim (South Korea) (decision), def. Burke (U.S.A.) (foul 7'52"), def. Jonsson (Sweden) (decision), drew with Ayvaz (Turkey); entered tiebreak for places 2–4; defeated Gvanseladze (Soviet Union (decision)), drew with Fujita (Japan)(→ Silver Medal)

78 kg

- Ion Țăranu def. Todorov (Bulgaria) (decision), drew with Kolesov (Soviet Union), def. Asghian (Iran) (decision), drew with Laakso(Finland)→5th place

82 kg

- Gheorghe Popovici drew with Olenik (Soviet Union), lost with Metz (Germany United Team) (decision)

87 kg

- Nicolae Martinescu drew with Sosnowski (Poland), def. Bulgarelli (Italy)(decision), def. Yilmaz (Turkey) (decision), def. Wiesberger (Austria) (decision), lost with Radev (Bulgaria)(decision)→4th place

+97 kg

- Ștefan Stângu drew with Kasabov (Bulgaria), lost to Svensson (Sweden) (decision).
