= Shooting at the 1964 Summer Olympics =

Shooting at the Games of the XVIII Olympiad
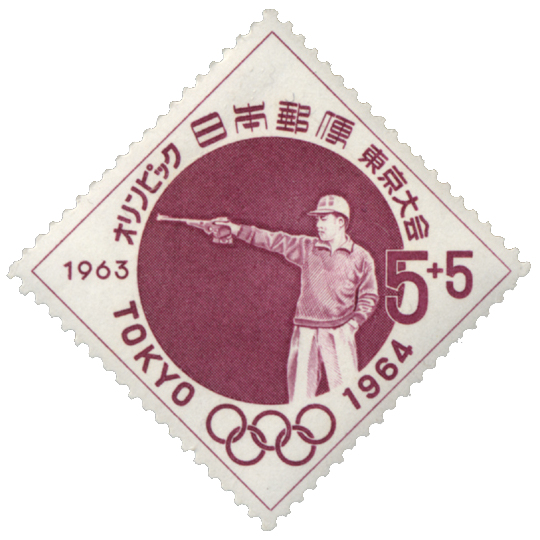
- Dates: 15–17 October 1964

Shooting at the 1964 Summer Olympics in Tokyo comprised six events, all for men only. They were held between 15 and 17 October 1964.

== Medal summary ==
Event	Gold		Silver		Bronze	
25 meter rapid fire pistol	Pentti Linnosvuo (FIN)	592	Ion Tripșa (ROU)	591	Lubomír Nácovský (TCH)	590
50 meter pistol	Väinö Markkanen (FIN)	560	Franklin Green (USA)	557	Yoshihisa Yoshikawa (JPN)	554
50 meter rifle prone	László Hammerl; Hungary	597	Lones Wigger; United States	597	Tommy Pool; United States	596
50 meter rifle three positions	Lones Wigger; United States	1164	Velichko Velichkov; Bulgaria	1152	László Hammerl; Hungary	1151
300 meter rifle, three positions	Gary Anderson (USA)	1153	Shota Kveliashvili (URS)	1144	Martin Gunnarsson (USA)	1136
Trap	Ennio Mattarelli; Italy	198	Pāvels Seničevs; Soviet Union	194	William Morris; United States	194

== Participating nations ==
A total of 262 shooters from 51 nations competed at the Tokyo Games:

- Argentina (8)
- Australia (8)
- Austria (3)
- Belgium (1)
- Bulgaria (4)
- Burma (2)
- Canada (6)
- Ceylon (2)
- Chile (3)
- Taiwan (6)
- Colombia (1)
- Czechoslovakia (4)
- Denmark (2)
- Egypt (6)
- Finland (8)
- France (4)
- United Team of Germany (10)
- Great Britain (8)
- Greece (4)
- Hong Kong (5)
- Hungary (8)
- India (2)
- Iran (4)
- Israel (3)
- Italy (5)
- Jamaica (1)
- Japan (10)
- Kenya (4)
- Lebanon (1)
- Luxembourg (1)
- Malaysia (7)
- Mexico (5)
- Mongolia (3)
- Netherlands (1)
- Norway (3)
- Pakistan (4)
- Peru (9)
- Philippines (9)
- Poland (6)
- Portugal (4)
- Puerto Rico (3)
- Rhodesia (2)
- Romania (9)
- South Korea (10)
- Soviet Union (10)
- Spain (5)
- Sweden (6)
- Switzerland (8)
- Thailand (10)
- United States (10)
- Venezuela (5)

== Medal count ==
Rank	Nation	Gold	Silver	Bronze	Total
1	United States	2	2	3	7
2	Finland	2	0	0	2
3	Hungary	1	0	1	2
4	Italy	1	0	0	1
5	Soviet Union	0	2	0	2
6	Bulgaria	0	1	0	1
6	Romania	0	1	0	1
8	Czechoslovakia	0	0	1	1
8	Japan	0	0	1	1
Totals (9 entries)		6	6	6	18
