= Shooting at the 1964 Summer Olympics – Men's 25 metre rapid fire pistol =

Olympic shooting event

Men's 25 metre rapid fire pistol at the Games of the XVIII Olympiad
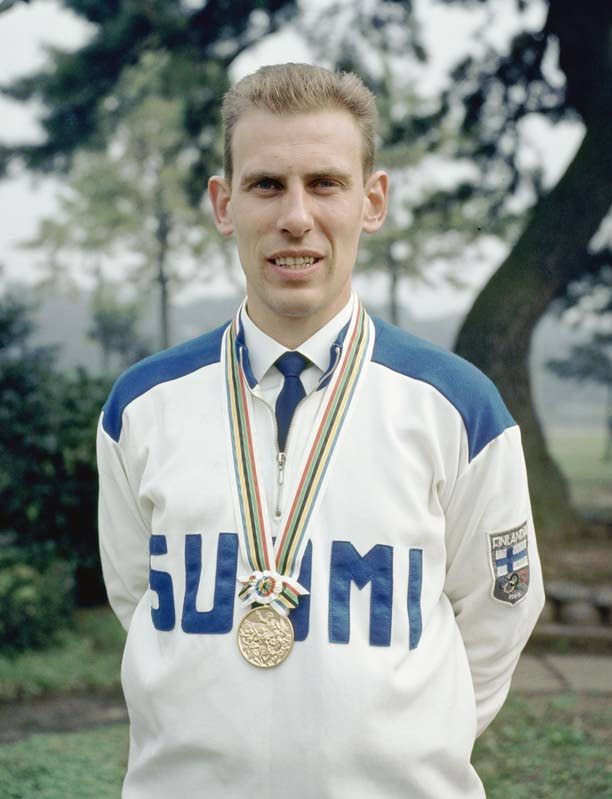
- Pentti Linnosvuo
- Venue: Camp Asaka
- Date: 19 October 1964
- Competitors: 53 from 34 nations
- Winning score: 592 OR

Medalists
1st place, gold medalist(s)		Pentti Linnosvuo; Finland
2nd place, silver medalist(s)		Ion Tripșa; Romania
3rd place, bronze medalist(s)		Lubomír Nácovský; Czechoslovakia

The men's ISSF 25 meter rapid fire pistol was a shooting sports event held as part of the Shooting at the 1964 Summer Olympics programme. It was the 12th appearance of the event. The competition was held on 19 October 1964 at the Camp Asaka shooting ranges in Tokyo. 53 shooters from 34 nations competed. Nations had been limited to two shooters each since the 1952 Games. The event was won by Pentti Linnosvuo of Finland, the nation's first victory in the event. Linnosvuo was the fourth man to win multiple medals in the event, adding to his 1960 silver; it was his fourth straight Games finishing in the top 5 of the event. Ion Tripșa of Romania took silver, putting that nation back on the podium after a one-Games absence. Czechoslovakia's first rapid fire pistol medal came in the form of Lubomír Nácovský's bronze.

== Background ==
This was the 12th appearance of what had been standardised in 1948 as the men's ISSF 25 meter rapid fire pistol event, the only event on the 2020 programme that traces back to 1896. The event has been held at every Summer Olympics except 1904 and 1928 (when no shooting events were held) and 1908; it was nominally open to women from 1968 to 1980, although very few women participated these years. There is no women's equivalent on the Olympic programme, as of 2021. The first five events were quite different, with some level of consistency finally beginning with the 1932 event—which, though it had differences from the 1924 competition, was roughly similar. The 1936 competition followed the 1932 one quite closely. The post-World War II event substantially altered the competition once again.

The top four of the top 10 shooters from 1960 returned: gold medalist William McMillan of the United States, silver medalist (and top five finisher in both 1952 and 1956) Pentti Linnosvuo of Finland, bronze medalist Aleksandr Zabelin of the Soviet Union, and fourth-place finisher Hansruedi Schneider of Switzerland. Zabelin was the reigning (1962) world championship, with he his countryman and runner-up Igor Bakalov making up a formidable Soviet team in Tokyo. Szilárd Kun of Hungary, the 1952 silver medalist, also made a return to Olympic competition.

Kenya and Malaysia each made their debut in the event. The United States made its 10th appearance in the event, most of any nation.

== Competition format ==
The competition format followed the 1948 format, now very close to the modern rapid fire pistol competition after significant variation before World War II. Each shooter fired 60 shots. These were done in two courses of 30; each course consisted of two stages of 15; each stage consisted of three series of 5. In each stage, the time limit for each series was 8 seconds for the first, 6 seconds for the second, and 4 seconds for the third.

A holdover from the previous Games was that full-body silhouettes, rather than round targets, continued to be used; however, scoring rings had been added so that now each shot was scored up to 10 rather than being strictly hit or miss.

One change from 1948–1956 was that hits were no longer the primary measurement of success. As in 1960, ranking was done by score, regardless of hits.

== Records ==
Prior to the competition, the existing world and Olympic records were as follows.

World record	Aleksandr Kropotin (URS)	595		1963
Olympic record	Ștefan Petrescu (ROU)	587	Melbourne, Australia	4–5 December 1956

The top seven shooters beat the Olympic record, with the 8th through 10th place finishers matching it. Pentti Linnosvuo finished with the new record at 592 points.

== Schedule ==
Date	Time	Round
Monday, 19 October 1964	9:30; 13:00	Course 1 Course 2

== Results ==
Rank	Shooter	Nation	Score	Notes
1st place, gold medalist(s)	Pentti Linnosvuo	Finland	592	OR
2nd place, silver medalist(s)	Ion Tripșa	Romania	591	
3rd place, bronze medalist(s)	Lubomír Nácovský	Czechoslovakia	590	
4	Hans Albrecht	Switzerland	590	
5	Szilárd Kun	Hungary	589	
6	Marcel Roșca	Romania	588	
7	Igor Bakalov	Soviet Union	588	
8	Kanji Kubo	Japan	587	
9	Ladislav Falta	Czechoslovakia	587	
10	Tony Clark	Great Britain	587	
11	Hansruedi Schneider	Switzerland	586	
12	Bill McMillan	United States	586	
13	Lothar Jacobi	United Team of Germany	585	
14	Jean Renaux	France	584	
15	Józef Zapędzki	Poland	584	
16	Aleksandr Zabelin	Soviet Union	584	
17	Edwin Teague	United States	583	
18	Dencho Denev	Bulgaria	582	
19	Michael Papps	Australia	582	
20	Tibor Gonczol	Australia	581	
21	Alkiviadis Papageorgopoulos	Greece	581	
22	William Hare	Canada	579	
23	Gábor Balla	Hungary	579	
24	Osamu Ochiai	Japan	579	
25	Stig Berntsson	Sweden	578	
26	Gerhard Feller	United Team of Germany	577	
27	Kalle Sievänen	Finland	576	
28	Manuel José Fernández	Argentina	576	
29	Nicolaus Zwetnow	Norway	576	
30	Sumol Sumontame	Thailand	575	
31	Giovanni Liverzani	Italy	574	
32	Juan Carlos Oxoby	Argentina	574	
33	Juan Thomas	Spain	574	
34	Guillermo Cornejo	Peru	573	
35	Taweesak Kasiwat	Thailand	571	
36	Ugo Amicosante	Italy	570	
37	Leon Lyon	Puerto Rico	570	
38	Alan Bray	Great Britain	569	
39	Lee Jong-hyeon	South Korea	565	
40	José-Antonio Chalbaud	Venezuela	565	
41	Álvaro Clopatofsky	Colombia	560	
42	Abdallah Zohdy	Egypt	555	
43	Armando López-Torres	Peru	553	
44	Leonard Bull	Kenya	553	
45	José Manuel Carpinteiro	Portugal	552	
46	Park Nam-kyu	South Korea	552	
47	Garfield McMahon	Canada	551	
48	Horacio Miranda	Philippines	548	
49	Hav Abdur Rashid	Pakistan	538	
50	Paterno Miranda	Philippines	535	
51	Alan Handford-Rice	Kenya	515	
52	Loh Ah Chee	Malaysia	495	
53	Ma Chen-shan	Taiwan	482	
