= Alan Rice =

Alan Rice may refer to:

- Alan Rice (cricketer), English cricketer
- Alan Rice (wrestler), American wrestler

== See also ==
- Alan Handford-Rice, Kenyan sport shooter
- Alan Rice-Oxley, British World War I flying ace
- Allen Rice, American football player
- C. Allen Thorndike Rice, American journalist
