= Shooting at the 1964 Summer Olympics – Men's 50 metre rifle three positions =

Shooting sport at the Olympics

Men's 50 metre rifle three positions at the Games of the XVIII Olympiad
- Venue: Tokyo, Japan
- Date: 20 October 1964
- Competitors: 53 from 33 nations

Medalists
1st place, gold medalist(s)		Lones Wigger	United States
2nd place, silver medalist(s)		Velichko Velichkov	Bulgaria
3rd place, bronze medalist(s)		László Hammerl	Hungary

The Men's 50 metre rifle three positions event was a shooting sports event held as part of the Shooting at the 1964 Summer Olympics programme. It was the fourth appearance of the event. The competition was held on 20 October 1964 at the shooting ranges in Tokyo. 53 shooters from 33 nations competed.

== Results ==
Place	Shooter	Total
1	Lones Wigger (USA)	1164
2	Velichko Velichkov (BUL)	1152
3	László Hammerl (HUN)	1151
4	Harry Köcher (EUA)	1148
5	Jerzy Nowicki (POL)	1147
6	Tommy Pool (USA)	1147
7	Ion Olărescu (ROU)	1144
8	Kurt Müller (SUI)	1143
9	Viktor Shamburkin (URS)	1142
10	Don Tolhurst (AUS)	1141
11	Vladimir Chuyan (URS)	1141
12	Tibor Jakosits (HUN)	1141
13	Niels Petersen (DEN)	1140
14	Ole Hviid Jensen (DEN)	1139
15	Vilho Ylönen (FIN)	1136
16	Jan Poignant (SWE)	1135
17	Erwin Vogt (SUI)	1133
18	Henryk Górski (POL)	1132
19	Olegario Vázquez (MEX)	1132
20	Nicolae Rotaru (ROU)	1132
21	Magne Landrø (NOR)	1131
22	Klaus Zähringer (EUA)	1131
23	Martsel Koen (BUL)	1130
24	Esa Kervinen (FIN)	1129
25	Takao Ishii (JPN)	1128
26	Frans Lafortune (BEL)	1126
27	John Sundberg (SWE)	1123
28	Vladimír Stibořík (TCH)	1122
29	Abel Vázquez (MEX)	1115
30	Oscar Caceres (PER)	1114
31	Hubert Hammerer (AUT)	1113
32	George Marsh (CAN)	1111
33	(Taiwan) Wu Tao-yan (TWN)	1107
34	Shigemi Saito (JPN)	1106
35	John Murphy (AUS)	1104
36	Hannan Crystal (ISR)	1103
37	Heo Uk-bong (KOR)	1103
38	Gil Boa (CAN)	1100
39	Victor Kremer (LUX)	1099
40	Joop van Domselaar (NED)	1098
41	Sin Hyeon-ju (KOR)	1097
42	Adolfo Feliciano (PHI)	1094
43	Krisada Arunwong (THA)	1093
44	Eduardo Armella (ARG)	1092
45	Tüvdiin Tserendondov (MGL)	1087
46	Carlos Lastarria (PER)	1086
47	Salai Srisathorn (THA)	1086
48	Martin Gison (PHI)	1073
49	Peter Rull, Sr. (HKG)	1047
50	Aziz Ahmed Chaudhry (PAK)	1040
51	Reginald Dos Remedios (HKG)	1027
52	Wong Foo Wah (MAS)	1019
53	Nasser Sharifi (IRI)	1018
