= Woosley =

Woosley is an English surname. Notable people with the surname include:

- Belinda Woosley, Australian swimmer
- Louisa Woosley, the first woman ordained as a minister in any Presbyterian denomination
- Raymond L. Woosley, founding president and chairman of the board for AZCERT
- Stanford E. Woosley, director of the Center for Supernova Research at University of California, Santa Cruz
- Tiffany Woosley, professional basketball player

== See also ==
- Wolseley
