= Cathy Ferguson =

American swimmer (born 1948)

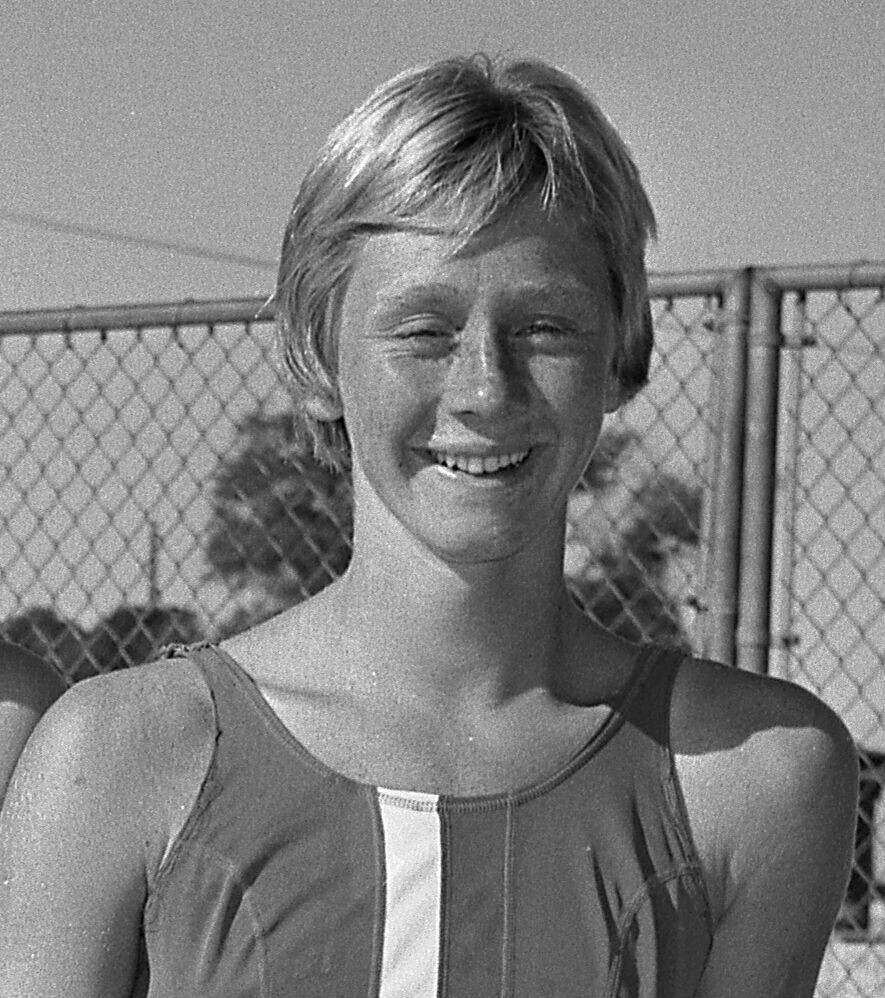
- Ferguson in 1964

Personal information
- Full name: Cathy Jean Ferguson
- National team: United States
- Born: July 22, 1949 (age 77) Stockton, California, U.S.
- Height: 5 ft 8 in (173 cm)
- Weight: 134 lb (61 kg)
- Spouses: Frank Cullum; Larry Brennan
- Children: 3

Sport
- Sport: Swimming
- Strokes: Backstroke
- Club: Los Angeles Athletic Club
- Coach: Peter Daland (LAAC, 64 Olympics)
Medal record
Women's swimming
Representing the United States
Olympic Games
Gold medal – first place	1964 Tokyo	100 m backstroke
Gold medal – first place	1964 Tokyo	4x100 m medley
Pan American Games
Silver medal – second place	1963 São Paulo	100 m backstroke
Bronze medal – third place	1967 Winnipeg	200 m backstroke

Cathy Jean Ferguson (born July 22, 1948), known for a time by her married name Cathy Ferguson Brennan is an American former competition swimmer, who competed for the Los Angeles Athletic Club, was a two-time Olympic gold medalist, and a former world record-holder. She participated at the 1964 Olympic Games in Tokyo, Japan, where she received the gold medal for winning the women's 100-meter backstroke, and another gold as a member of the first-place U.S. team in the women's 4×100-meter medley relay. After completing a Doctorate from the U.S. International University in San Diego, she worked as a Professor, Coach and Director of Aquatics at California State University, Long Beach for 20 years, was a director of Sports Medicine at Anaheim Memorial Hospital, and served as a CEO for Girl Scouts of Central California.

== Early life and swimming ==
Ferguson was born in Stockton, California, to Mr. and Mrs. David L. Ferguson. Both parents were accomplished recreational swimmers but did not compete. In one of her earliest meets at age 11, she won a 50-yard backstroke competition at a state-wide meet in Watsonville, California, setting an age group record.

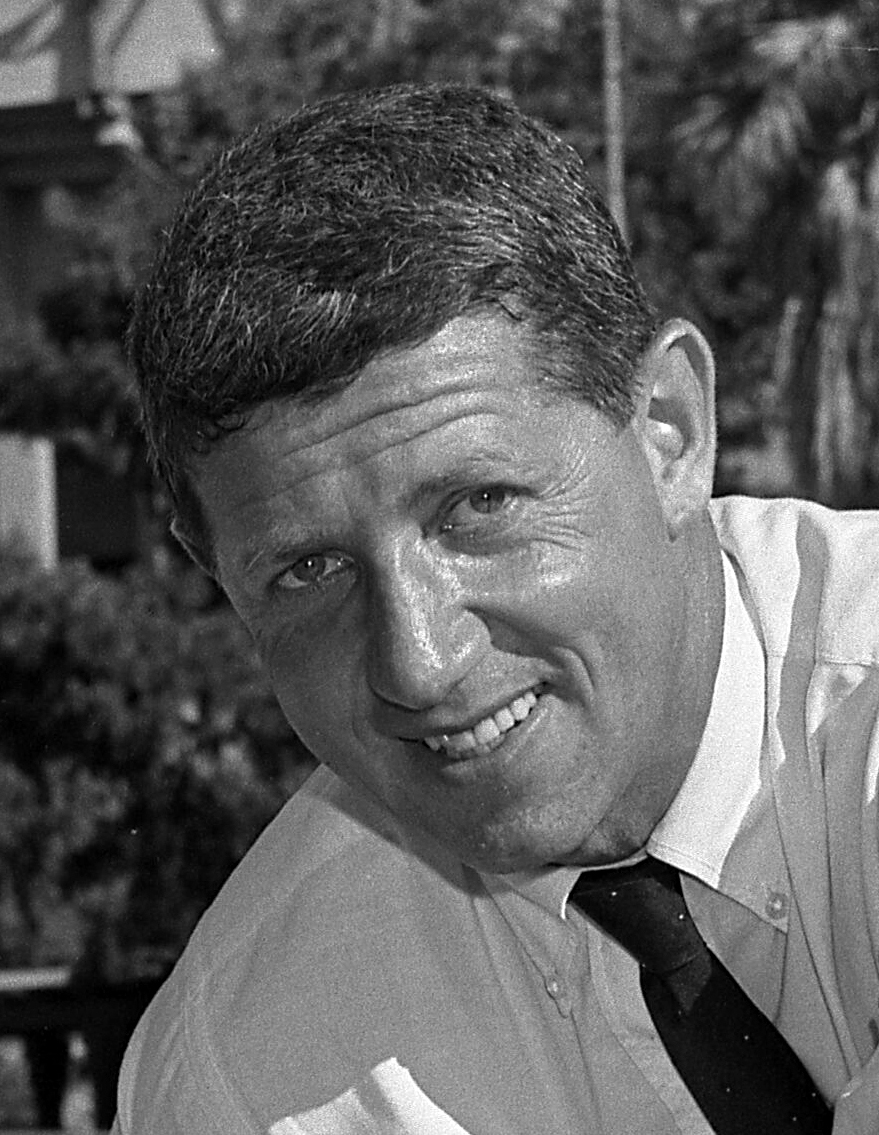
Coach Peter Daland, 1964

Ferguson attended Burbank High School in Burbank, California where she graduated in June 1966, and was still in High School when she became an Olympic champion. She did not begin swimming until the age of 10 at the Burbank YMCA with instructors Bill Elko and Nels Lofgran, but by 1960 began serious training with the Los Angeles Athletic Club under Coach Ken Schafter and Hall of Fame Coach Peter Daland, who also coached Ferguson and the U.S. women's team at the 1964 Olympics. Daland noted that while training at her peak around 1965, she gained endurance and strength from extensive work with pulley weights, and running a mile before swim practice.

== 1964 Olympic gold medal ==
As only a 16-year old High School Junior, Ferguson took two gold medals at the 1964 Tokyo Olympics, one in the 100-meter backstroke, and one in the 4x100-meter medley. Facing fierce competition in her first event, Ferguson was among five other world record holders in the 100m backstroke final which resulted in several very close finishes. Ferguson managed to outperform this exceptional field by capturing the gold medal with a new world record of 1:07.7, only .2 seconds ahead of second place finisher, Christine Caron of France. Ferguson did not overtake Caron in the tightly contested competition until the end of the race. Ginny Duenkel of the U.S. took the bronze with a 1:08.0, only a tenth of second behind the silver medal winner Caron. Having set a world record over 200m the previous month, Ferguson became a record holder at both backstroke distances after setting her Olympic record.

Ferguson also set a world record in the 4x100 meter medley relay at the 1964 Olympics where she swam the opening backstroke leg as a member of the winning U.S. team that took the gold medal with the record time of 4:33.9. She had previously been part of another world record breaking 4x100 meter medley relay team prior to the Olympics. Having set two world records, she was given a reception at her High School on October 28, featuring the Mayor of Burbank, Dallas Williams.

After the Olympics, at the 1965 National AAU Women's Swimming and Diving Championships, Ferguson won the 100-yard backstroke in the American record time of 1:00.9, and the 200-yard backstroke in 2:13.2. At the Santa Clara Invitational in July, 1967, Ferguson won the 100 meter backstroke, the meet's opening event, with a time of 1:09.8.

== Swimming achievements ==
In her career, Ferguson set seven U.S. records in addition to her four world records, and won 10 American Athletic Union titles. At the Los Angeles Invitational Swim Meet in the Women's 200-meter freestyle, Ferguson tied for second behind first place Pokey Watson who finished in the world record time of 2:11.6 in the event. Ferguson retired from competitive swimming before the 1968 Olympics.

== Education ==
Ferguson completed her undergraduate education studying Physical Education at California State University Long Beach around 1970. At Cal State, she met husband Frank Cullum at 19, earned top grades, and may have swum occasionally with the Cal State Women's team. She then earned a Masters from Montana State University in physical education beginning around 1970 where she taught swimming, and later received a Phd from the United States International University in San Diego.

== Post-swimming work-life ==
Ferguson later married Larry Brennan, who in 1983 worked as an English teacher and diving coach at Westminster High, where Cathy would also briefly coach swimming. Cathy raised three children, and had a long, and often part-time career coaching high school and club level swimming in California. She served with the Nellie Gail Swim Club in Laguna Hills in the 80s. Ferguson worked as an educator for twenty years, first at the College of Great Falls in Montana, and then as an Assistant Professor in physical education and director of Aquatics at Cal State Long Beach. During her Collegiate teaching career, she served as head swimming coach of the Los Caballeros Swim team in Fountain Valley, California. She retired from swim coaching in 1996. In the 1980s, Ferguson served as Director for Sports Medicine at Anaheim Memorial Hospital. She worked as development director for GOAL, a program associated with Disney that sought to motivate low income youth through athletics, service to the greater community, and academics. She is an author, and developed an infant water program that stressed awareness for the Red Cross. In 1996, Ferguson served as the president of Southern California Olympians. From 2000-2018, she served with Girl Scouts of American and worked her way to becoming CEO of Girl Scouts of Central California South.

Two of Ferguson's daughters competed as divers. Her daughters Kellie and Allison were both divers for the University of Southern California.

At 67, living in Clovis, California, Ferguson walked five miles a day and lifted weights three days a week to remain fit. She had also enjoyed ballroom dancing as a recreation.

== Honors ==
In 1966, Ferguson was voted to the All-American Swimming and Diving Team by the Amateur Athletic Union. She was voted "World Swimmer of the Year" in 1965, and inducted into the International Swimming Hall of Fame as an "Honor Swimmer" in 1978. During her swimming career in the 1960s, she was voted YMCA Swimmer of the Year. In August, 2000, she was inducted into the Los Angeles Athletic Club Hall of Fame and presented the award at a ceremony by her former coach Peter Daland. Ferguson was a nominee, though not a recipient of the prestigious Sullivan Award given to the most outstanding Olympic or Collegiate athlete in the United States.

== See also ==
- List of members of the International Swimming Hall of Fame
- List of Olympic medalists in swimming (women)
- World record progression 100 metres backstroke
- World record progression 200 metres backstroke
- World record progression 4 × 100 metres medley relay
