= Kenya at the 1964 Summer Olympics =

- IOC code: KEN
- NOC: National Olympic Committee of Kenya
- Website: teamkenya.or.ke

in Tokyo
- Competitors: 37 in 5 sports
- Flag bearer: Kip Keino
- Medals Ranked 35th: Gold 0 Silver 0 Bronze 1 Total 1

Summer Olympics appearances (overview)
- 1956; 1960; 1964; 1968; 1972; 1976–1980; 1984; 1988; 1992; 1996; 2000; 2004; 2008; 2012; 2016; 2020; 2024

Kenya competed at the 1964 Summer Olympics in Tokyo, Japan for the first time as an independent country. 37 competitors, all men, took part in 21 events in 5 sports. Wilson Kiprugut won the nation's first ever Olympic medal.

== Medalists ==
Medal	Name	Sport	Event	Date
Bronze	Wilson Kiprugut	Athletics	Men's 800m	16 October

== Hockey ==
- Kenya national field hockey team finished 6th

== Sailing ==
- Peter Cooke Rank 24

== Shooting ==
Four shooters represented Kenya in 1964.

25 m pistol

- Leonard Bull
- Alan Handford-Rice

50 m pistol

- Michael Horner

50 m rifle, prone

- Nigel Vernon-Roberts
