= Jeong-eun =

- Hangul: 정은
- RR: Jeongeun
- MR: Chŏngŭn
- IPA: [tɕʌŋɯn]

Jeong-eun, also spelled Jung-eun, Jeong-un, or Jong-un, is a Korean given name.

The Seoul-based Korean Broadcasting System (KBS) reported, based on a document obtained by North Korean defector and KBS employee Park Jin-hee, that beginning in January 2011 North Korea banned birth registrations using the name Kim Jong-un and required existing bearers of the name to change to a different name. The authenticity of the document could not be confirmed.

People with this name include:

== Entertainers ==
- Kim Jung-eun (born 1976), South Korean actress
- Kim Ji-woo (born Kim Jeong-eun, 1983), South Korean actress
- Im Jung-eun (born 1981), South Korean actress
- Jo Jung-eun (born 1996), South Korean actress
- Kim Lip (born Kim Jung-eun, 1999) South Korean singer, member of Artms, Odd Eye Circle and LOONA
- Heo Jung-eun (born 2007), South Korean actress

== Sportspeople ==
- Jeong Jeong-eun (born 1945), South Korean volleyball player
- Park Jung-eun (born 1977), South Korean basketball player
- Kim Jung-eun (basketball) (born 1987), South Korean basketball player
- Ha Jung-eun (born 1987), South Korean badminton player
- Lee Jung-eun (sport shooter) (born 1987), South Korean sport shooter
- Lee Jeong-eun (golfer, born 1988), South Korean golfer
- Lee Jung-eun (judoka) (born 1988), South Korean judo practitioner
- Seo Jung-eun (born 1991), South Korean field hockey player
- Lee Jeong-eun (racewalker) (born 1994), South Korean racewalker
- Lee Jeong-eun (golfer, born 1996), South Korean golfer

== Other ==
- Meredith Jung-En Woo (born 1958), South Korean-born American academic and author
- Hwang Jung-eun (born 1976), South Korean writer and podcaster
- Kim Jong Un (born 1983 or 1984), North Korean leader

== See also ==
- List of Korean given names
