= Juan Carlos Oxoby =

Argentine sports shooter

Personal information
- Born: 17 December 1931
- Died: 9 January 2010 (aged 78)

Sport
- Sport: Sports shooting

Juan Carlos Oxoby (17 December 1931 – 9 January 2010) was an Argentine sports shooter. He competed in the 25 metre pistol event at the 1964 Summer Olympics.
