= Shooting at the 1983 Pan American Games =

Shooting at the 1983 Pan American Games lists the results of all firearm-shooting events held at the 1983 Pan American Games in Caracas, Venezuela. Various event formats were included: those involving handguns, rifles, and shotguns (skeet). Events for both men and women were held.

== Men's events ==
| Event | Gold | Silver | Bronze |
|---|---|---|---|
| 10 metre air pistol | Carlos Hora; Peru | Donald Nygord; United States | Luis Ortiz; Colombia |
| 10 metre air rifle | James Meredith; United States | David Johnson; United States | Guy Lorion; Canada |
| 25 metre center fire pistol | Erich Buljung; United States | Edgar Espinoza; Venezuela | Guillermo Reyes; Cuba |
| 25 metre rapid fire pistol | Terence Anderson; United States | Bernardo Tovar; Colombia | Rafael Rodríguez; Cuba |
| 25 metre standard pistol | Erich Buljung; United States | George Ross; United States | Delival da Fonseca Nobre; Brazil |
| 50 metre pistol | Erich Buljung; United States | Silvio Aguiar; Brazil | Héctor Lima; Venezuela |
| 50 metre rifle prone | Rod Fitz-Randolph; United States | Lones Wigger; United States | Arnaldo Rodríguez; Cuba |
| 50 metre high power rifle prone | Boyd Goldsby; United States | Lones Wigger; United States | Patrick Vamplew; Canada |
| 50 metre rifle three positions | Lones Wigger; United States | Anthony Leone; United States | Miguel Valdés; Cuba |
| 50 metre high power rifle three positions | Lones Wigger; United States | Ray Carter; United States | Ricardo Rusticucci; Argentina |
| 50 metre running target | Helmut Bellingrodt; Colombia | Randy Stewart; United States | Michael English; United States |
| Skeet | Matthew Dryke; United States | Roberto Castrillo; Cuba | Carlos Zarzar; Chile |

== Women's events ==
| Event | Gold | Silver | Bronze |
|---|---|---|---|
| 10 metre air pistol | Cathy Graham; United States | Gail Liberty; United States | Linda Thom; Canada |
| 10 metre air rifle | Pat Spurgin; United States | Wanda Jewell; United States | Alejandra Hoyos; Colombia |
| 25 metre pistol | Kim Dyer; United States | Linda Thom; Canada | Gail Liberty; United States |
| 50 metre rifle prone | Deena Wigger; United States | Pat Spurgin; United States | Nilzer Cuba; Cuba |
| 50 metre rifle three positions | Wanda Jewell; United States | Gloria Parmentier; United States | Christina Schulze; Canada |

== Men's ==
| Event | Gold | Silver | Bronze |
|---|---|---|---|
| 10 metre air pistol | Ecuador; Ecuador | United States of America; United States | Venezuela; Venezuela |
| 10 metre air rifle | United States of America; United States | Canada; Canada | Argentina; Argentina |
| 25 metre center fire pistol | Venezuela; Venezuela | United States of America; United States | Cuba; Cuba |
| 25 metre rapid fire pistol | United States of America; United States | Cuba; Cuba | Colombia; Colombia |
| 25 metre standard pistol | United States of America; United States | Colombia; Colombia | Venezuela; Venezuela |
| 50 metre pistol | Venezuela; Venezuela | United States of America; United States | Brazil; Brazil |
| 50 metre high power rifle | United States of America; United States | Canada; Canada | Cuba; Cuba |
| 50 metre rifle prone | United States of America; United States | Canada; Canada | Cuba; Cuba |
| 50 metre high power rifle prone | United States of America; United States | Canada; Canada | Argentina; Argentina |
| 50 metre rifle three positions | United States of America; United States | Canada; Canada | Cuba; Cuba |
| 50 metre running target | United States of America; United States | Colombia; Colombia | Cuba; Cuba |
| Skeet | United States of America; United States | Cuba; Cuba | Chile; Chile |

== Women's ==
| Event | Gold | Silver | Bronze |
|---|---|---|---|
| 10 metre air pistol | United States of America; United States | Venezuela; Venezuela | Cuba; Cuba |
| 10 metre air rifle | United States of America; United States | Canada; Canada | Cuba; Cuba |
| 25 metre pistol | United States of America; United States | Cuba; Cuba | Venezuela; Venezuela |
| 50 metre rifle prone | United States of America; United States | Cuba; Cuba | Canada; Canada |
| 50 metre rifle three positions | United States of America; United States | Canada; Canada | Cuba; Cuba |

== Medal table ==
| Place | Nation | Gold medal | Silver medal | Bronze medal | Total |
|---|---|---|---|---|---|
| 1 | United States | 31 | 15 | 2 | 48 |
| 2 | Venezuela | 2 | 2 | 4 | 10 |
| 3 | Colombia | 1 | 3 | 3 | 6 |
| 4 | Peru | 1 | 0 | 0 | 1 |
| 5 | Ecuador | 1 | 0 | 0 | 1 |
| 6 | Canada | 0 | 8 | 6 | 13 |
| 7 | Cuba | 0 | 5 | 13 | 19 |
| 8 | Brazil | 0 | 1 | 1 | 3 |
| 9 | Argentina | 0 | 0 | 4 | 4 |
| 10 | Chile | 0 | 0 | 3 | 3 |
| Total | | 36 | 36 | 36 | 106 |
