= Abel Vázquez (sport shooter) =

Mexican sports shooter

Personal information
- Full name: Abel Vázquez Raña
- Born: 18 October 1940
- Died: 13 November 2023 (aged 83)

Sport
- Country: Mexico
- Sport: Sports shooting

Abel Vázquez Raña (Note: In this Spanish name, the first or paternal surname is Vázquez and the second or maternal family name is Raña.) (18 October 1940 – 13 November 2023) was a Mexican sports shooter. He competed in the 50 metre rifle, three positions event at the 1964 Summer Olympics.
