= Abdallah Zohdy =

Egyptian sports shooter (1928– 1968)

Isma'il Abdallah Zohdy
Personal information
- Born: 3 December 1928
- Died: 8 April 1968 (aged 39) Cairo, United Arab Republic

Sport
- Sport: Sports shooting

Abdallah Zohdy (3 December 1928 – 8 April 1968) was an Egyptian sports shooter. He competed in the 25 metre pistol event at the 1964 Summer Olympics.
