= Salai Srisathorn =

Thai sports shooter (born 1933)

Personal information
- Born: 17 November 1933 (age 92)

Sport
- Sport: Sports shooting

Salai Srisathorn (born 17 November 1933) is a Thai former sports shooter. He competed in the 50 metre rifle, three positions event at the 1964 Summer Olympics. He also competed at the 1966 Asian Games.
