= Codlea =

City in Brașov County, Romania

Codlea Zeiden (German)
- Municipality
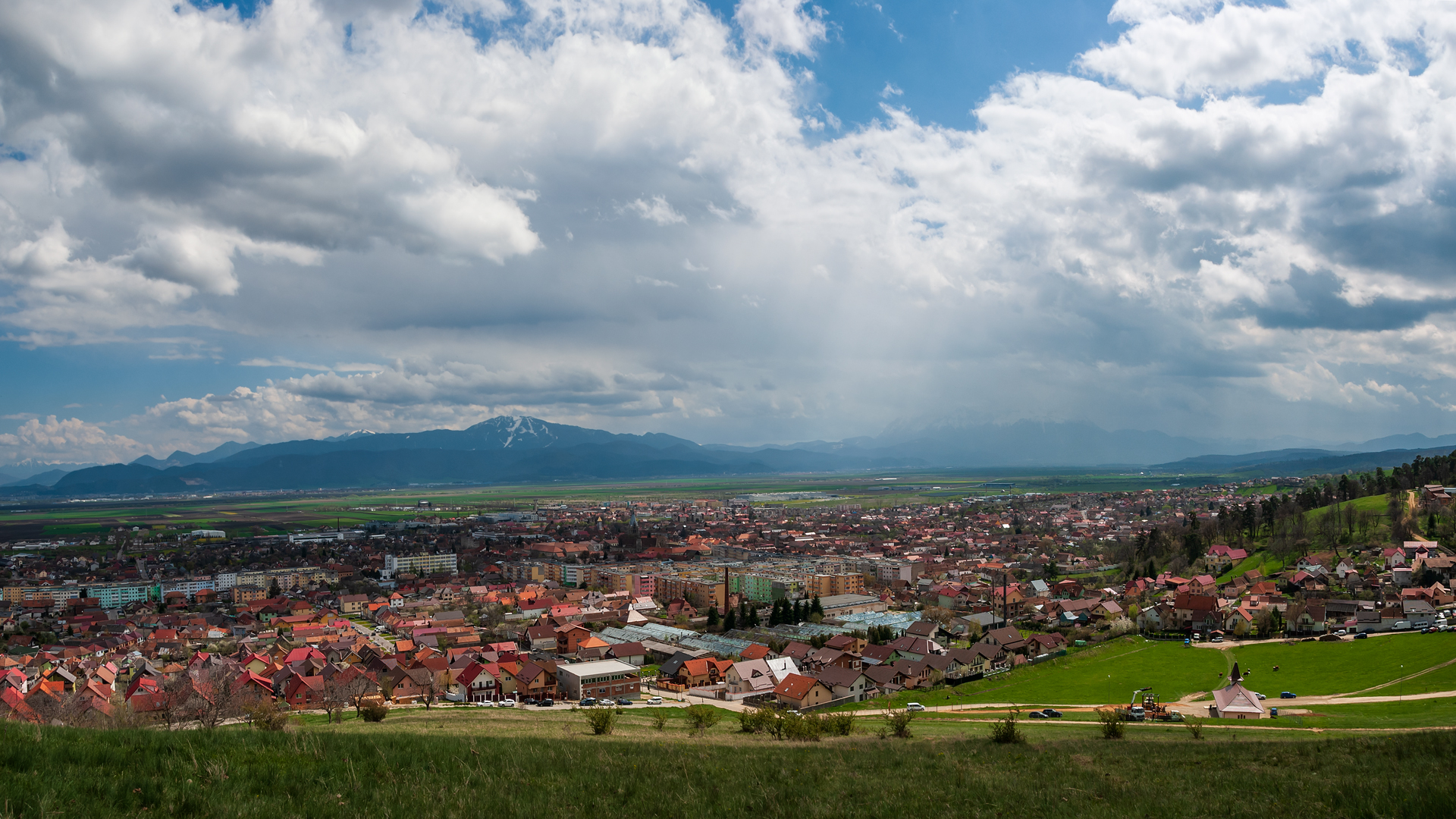
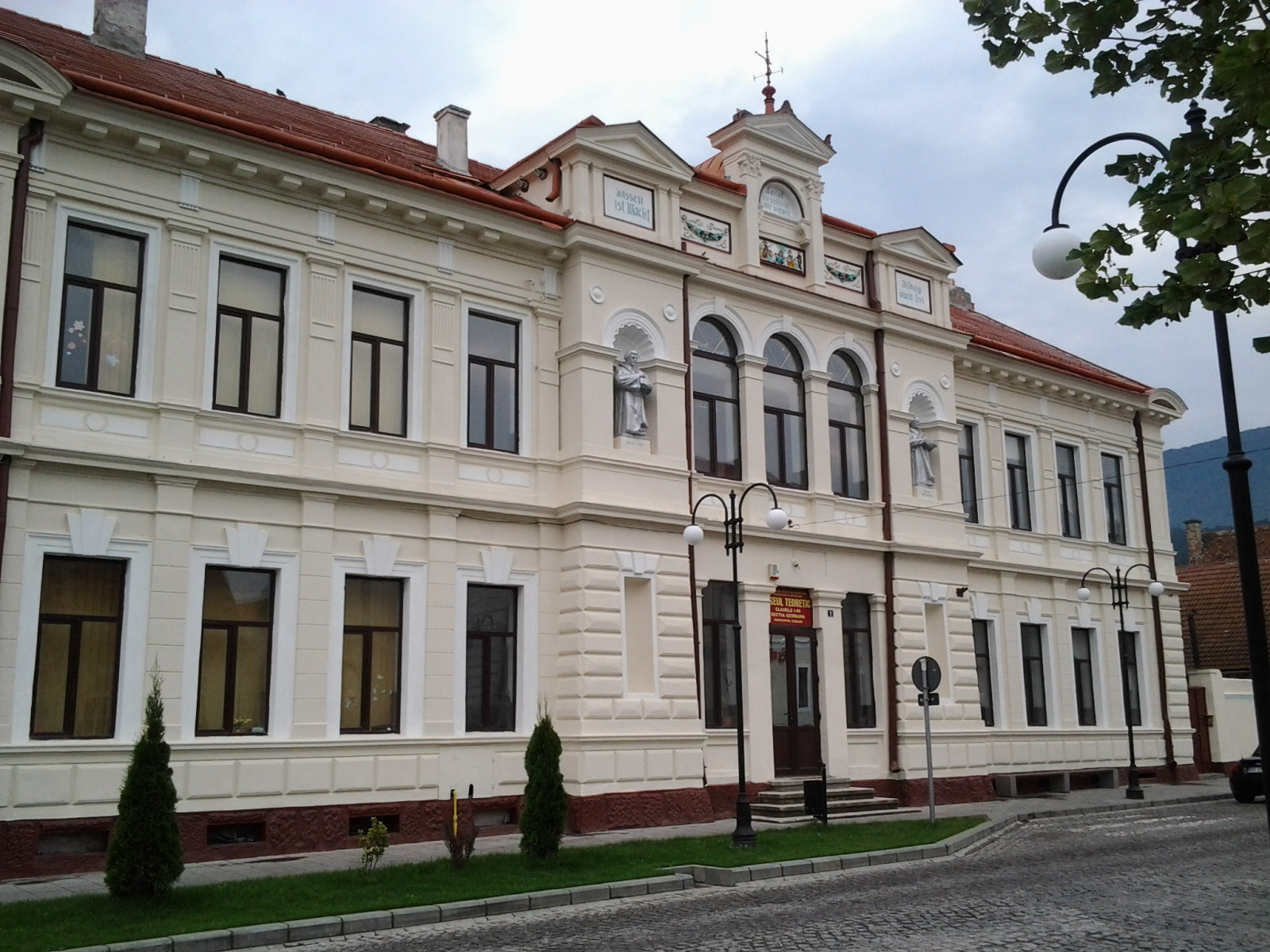
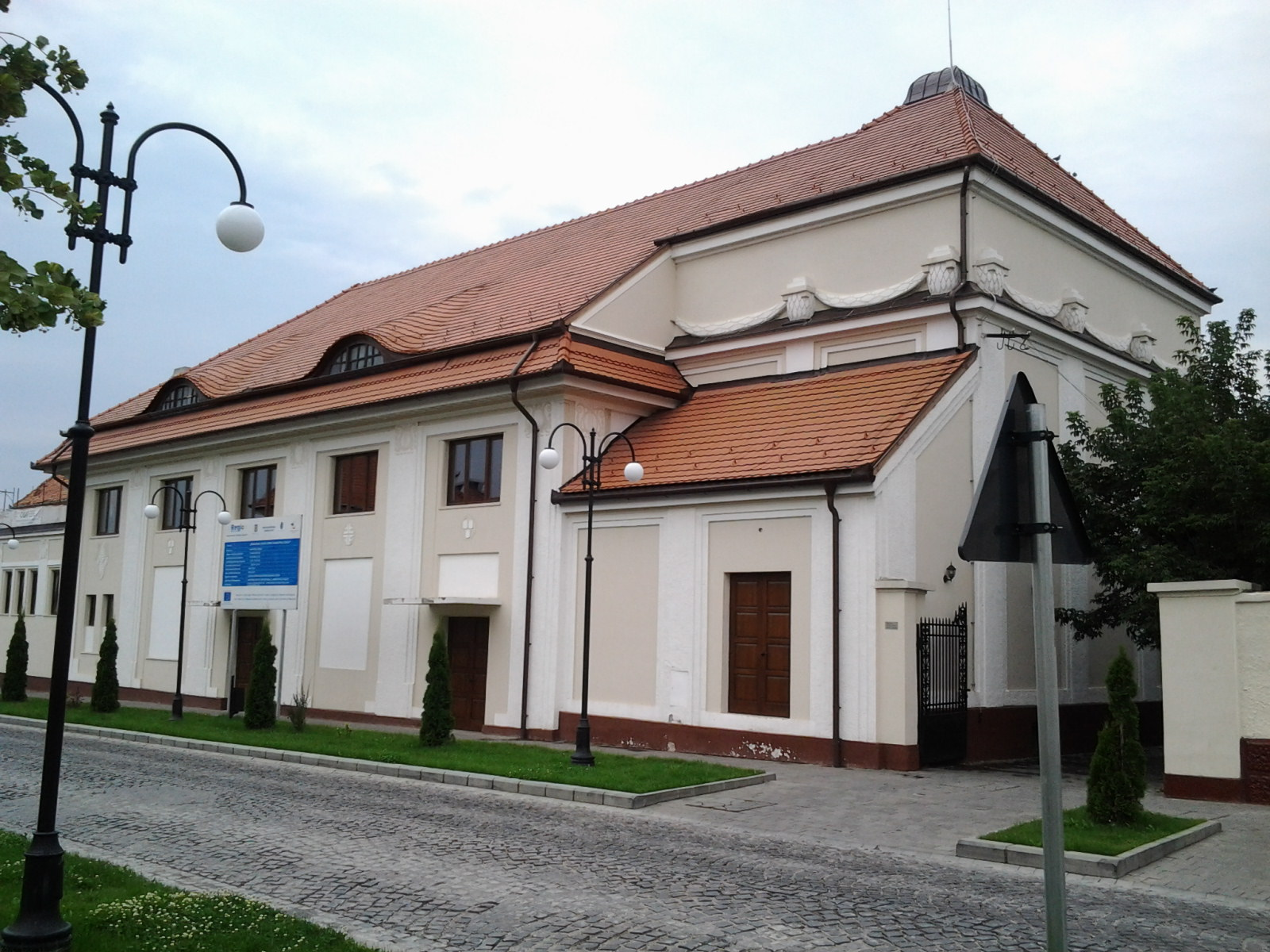
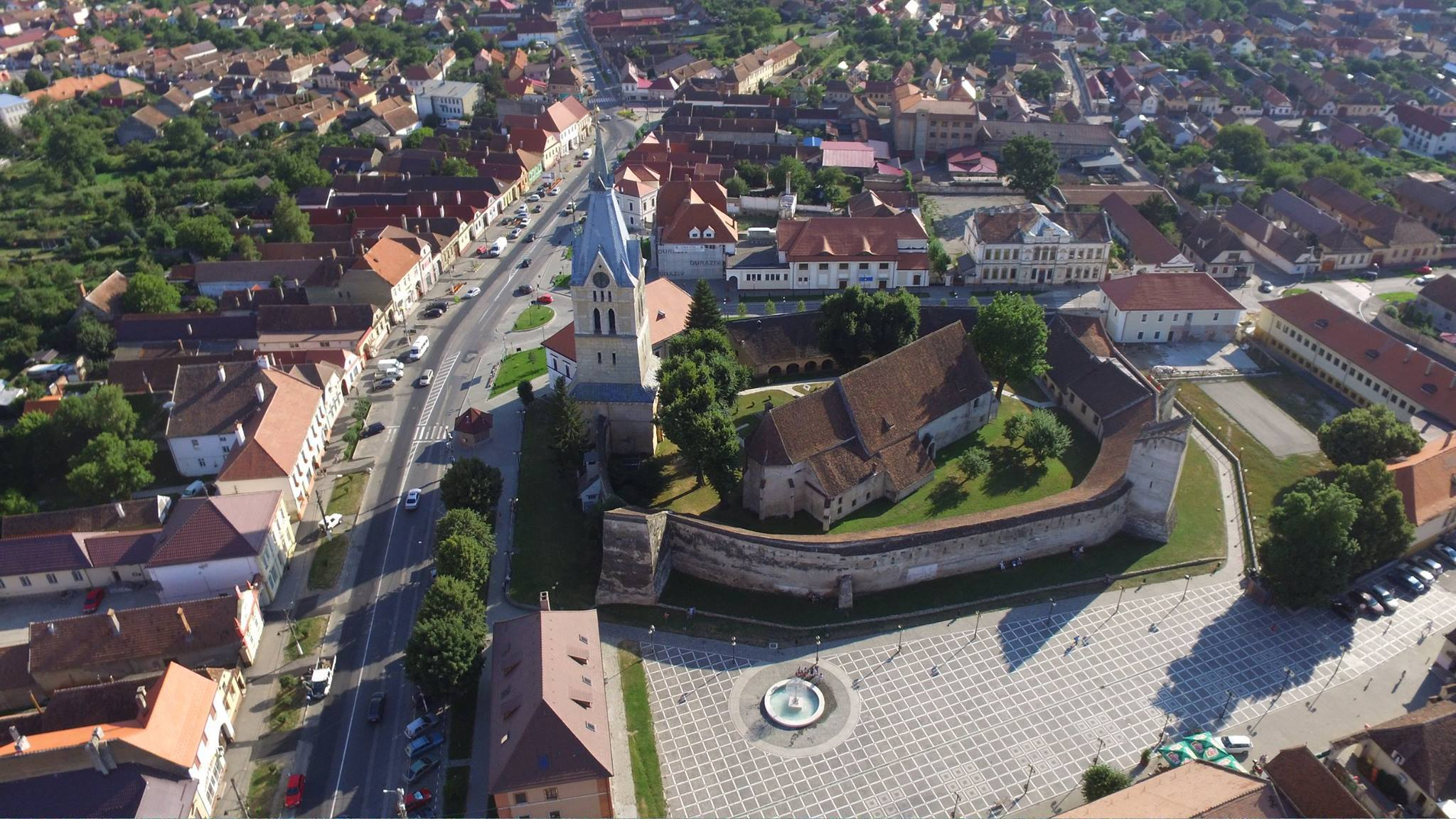
- Codlea seen from the hill Old German School Cultural House Museum of Traditions and Fortified Church of Codlea

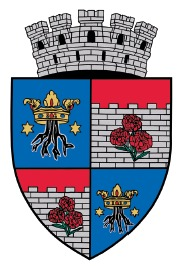
- Coat of arms

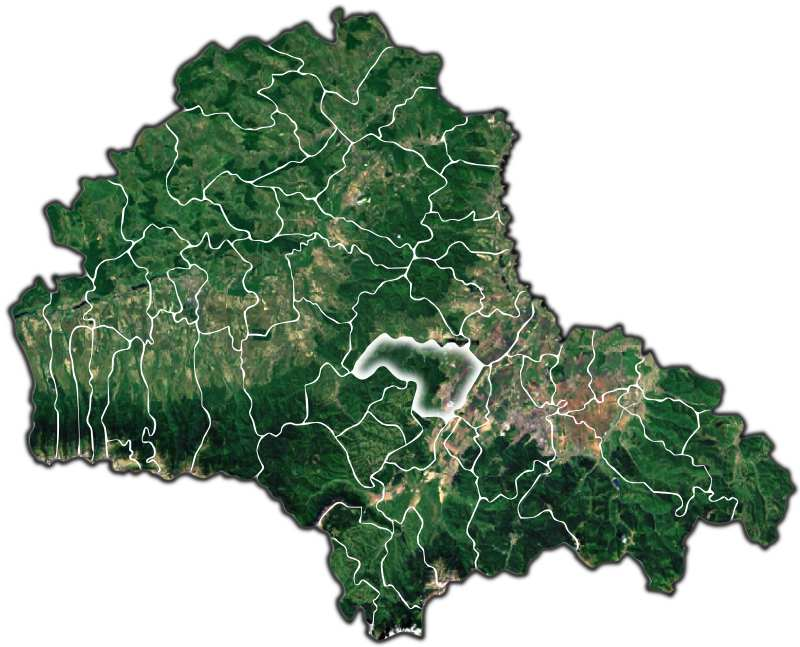
- Location in Brașov County

- Location in Romania
- Coordinates: 45°41′49″N 25°26′38″E
- Country: Romania
- County: Brașov

Government
  - Mayor (2024–2028): Paul-Mihai Cîmpeanu (PSD)
- Area: 132.79 km^{2} (51.27 sq mi)
- Elevation: 561 m (1,841 ft)
- Population (2021-12-01): 20,534
  - Density: 154.64/km^{2} (400.50/sq mi)
- Time zone: UTC+02:00 (EET)
  - Summer (DST): UTC+03:00 (EEST)
- Postal code: 505100
- Area code: (+40) 02 68
- Vehicle reg.: BV
- Website: www.primaria-codlea.ro

Codlea (Romanian pronunciation: [ˈkodle̯a]; German: Zeiden; Transylvanian Saxon dialect: Zäöeden; Hungarian: Feketehalom) is a city in Brașov County, Transylvania, Romania.

== Name ==
The Romanian name "Codlea" could be a derivation from the Latin codella, a diminutive of Latin coda (edge, rearward); or it could be a derivation from the Slavic kotlík ("kettle"), as the Măgura Codlei (in this reading: "Kettle Hill") looks like a kettle. In Romanian, măgură means "large hill, mound, forest located on a high place".

The hill also provides the Hungarian name of the city, Feketehegy, "Black Hill".

The German name's origin is unknown, but there is a theory that it was derived from Zeidler, an antiquated word for "beekeeper".

== History ==
Măgura Codlei

During the 13th century, the Teutonic Order built a fortress known as Schwarzburg ("black castle") near the "Măgura Codlei". The castle's name was first noted in 1265 and was rebuilt for the last time in 1432 by the craftsmen's guild that worked in the town. The city of Codlea is believed to have been also founded by Germans. The fortified church in the city is the largest in the Burzenland historic region. Codlea was well known for its flowers and was called the city of flowers.

== Climate ==
Codlea has a warm-summer humid continental climate (Dfb in the Köppen climate classification).

Climate data for Codlea
| Month | Jan | Feb | Mar | Apr | May | Jun | Jul | Aug | Sep | Oct | Nov | Dec | Year |
|---|---|---|---|---|---|---|---|---|---|---|---|---|---|
| Mean daily maximum °C (°F) | 0.6 (33.1) | 2.6 (36.7) | 7.3 (45.1) | 13.3 (55.9) | 18.1 (64.6) | 21.4 (70.5) | 23.2 (73.8) | 23.5 (74.3) | 18.5 (65.3) | 13.3 (55.9) | 8.2 (46.8) | 2.1 (35.8) | 12.7 (54.8) |
| Daily mean °C (°F) | −3.8 (25.2) | −2 (28) | 2.4 (36.3) | 8.2 (46.8) | 13.3 (55.9) | 16.9 (62.4) | 18.7 (65.7) | 18.7 (65.7) | 13.9 (57.0) | 8.4 (47.1) | 3.8 (38.8) | −1.9 (28.6) | 8.1 (46.5) |
| Mean daily minimum °C (°F) | −8.1 (17.4) | −6.6 (20.1) | −2.5 (27.5) | 2.6 (36.7) | 7.8 (46.0) | 11.8 (53.2) | 13.6 (56.5) | 13.7 (56.7) | 9.3 (48.7) | 4.2 (39.6) | 0.3 (32.5) | −5.4 (22.3) | 3.4 (38.1) |
| Average precipitation mm (inches) | 45 (1.8) | 42 (1.7) | 56 (2.2) | 73 (2.9) | 95 (3.7) | 100 (3.9) | 95 (3.7) | 78 (3.1) | 61 (2.4) | 53 (2.1) | 47 (1.9) | 49 (1.9) | 794 (31.3) |
Source: https://en.climate-data.org/europe/romania/brasov/codlea-15683/

== Population ==
- 1510: 670
- 1814: 3,264
- 1849: 3,764
- 1890: 4,035
  - 2,680 Germans (67%)
  - 1,211 Romanians (30%)
  - 44 Hungarians (1%)
  - 100 Jews and others (2%)
- 1930: 5,219
  - 3,111 Germans (60%)
  - 1,916 Romanians (36%)
  - 192 Hungarians (4%)
- 1941: 6,214
- 1966: 13,075
- 1977: 22,744
- 1982: 23,500
- 1992: 24,620
- 2002: 24,286
- 2011: 21,708
- 2021: 20,534

As of the 2011 census, 90.2% of inhabitants were Romanians, 5.6% Roma, 2.8% Hungarians, and 1% Germans. As of 2002, 86.8% were Romanian Orthodox, 3.7% Roman Catholic, 3.1% Pentecostal, 2.2% Christian Evangelical, 1% Evangelical Augustan Confession, and 0.8% Reformed.

== Natives ==
- Nicolae Florescu (1949–2011), football player
- Fritz Klein (1888–1945), Nazi SS doctor hanged for war crimes
- Dennis Politic (2000–), football player
- Doina Popescu (1938–), volleyball player
- Alexandru Zaharescu (1961–), mathematician
