= Álvaro Clopatofsky =

Colombian sports shooter

Personal information
- Full name: Álvaro Clopatofsky Thorschmidt
- Born: 20 April 1921 Bogotá, Colombia
- Died: 1993 (aged 71–72)

Sport
- Sport: Sports shooting

Álvaro Clopatofsky Thorschmidt (20 April 1921 – 1993) was a Colombian sports shooter. He competed in the 25 metre pistol event at the 1964 Summer Olympics.
