= Ursula Seitz =

Austrian swimmer

Personal information
- Born: 10 April 1948 (age 78)

Sport
- Sport: Swimming

Ursula Seitz (born 10 April 1948) is an Austrian former swimmer. She competed in the women's 100 metre backstroke at the 1964 Summer Olympics held in Tokyo, Japan.
