= Lothar Jacobi =

German sports shooter

Personal information
- Born: 27 August 1939 (age 86) Oelsnitz, Germany

Sport
- Sport: Sports shooting
- Event: 25 metre rapid fire pistol

Lothar Jacobi (born 27 August 1939) is a German former sports shooter. He competed in the 25 metre rapid fire pistol event at the 1964 Summer Olympics.

== Olympic Games ==
1964 Summer Olympics in Tokyo, competing for the United Team of Germany:

- Shooting – Men's 25 metre rapid fire pistol – 13th place
