= Gábor Balla =

Hungarian sports shooter

Personal information
- Born: 23 December 1941 (age 84) Budapest, Hungary

Sport
- Sport: Sports shooting

Gábor Balla (born 23 December 1941) is a Hungarian former sports shooter. He competed in the 25 metre pistol event at the 1964 Summer Olympics.
