= Edwin Teague =

American sports shooter

Personal information
- Nickname: Ed
- Born: October 26, 1934 Greensboro, North Carolina, United States
- Died: April 25, 2023 (aged 88) Tempe, Arizona, United States

Sport
- Sport: Sports shooting

Edwin Teague (October 26, 1934 – April 25, 2023) was an American sports shooter. He competed in the 25 metre pistol event at the 1964 Summer Olympics.
