= Petra Nerger =

German swimmer

Personal information
- Born: 13 July 1945 (age 80) Berlin, Germany

Sport
- Sport: Swimming

Petra Nerger (born 13 July 1945) is a German former swimmer. She competed in the women's 100 metre backstroke at the 1964 Summer Olympics.
