= Gary Rice =

English cricketer

Personal information
- Full name: Gary Sedgwick Rice
- Born: 24 August 1960 (age 66); Leicester, Leicestershire, England
- Batting: Right-handed
- Bowling: Right-arm medium
- Relatives: Alan Rice (father)

Domestic team information
- Years: Team
- 1982–1988: Cambridgeshire

Career statistics
Competition	List A
Matches	3
Runs scored	4
Batting average	2.00
100s/50s	–/–
Top score	4
Balls bowled	216
Wickets	2
Bowling average	83.00
5 wickets in innings	–
10 wickets in match	–
Best bowling	1/31
Catches/stumpings	1/–
- Source: Cricinfo, 15 April 2011

Gary Sedgwick Rice (born 24 August 1960) is a former English cricketer. Rice was a right-handed batsman who bowled right-arm medium pace. He was born in Leicester, Leicestershire, the son of Alan Rice who played first-class cricket for Leicestershire.

Rice made his debut for Cambridgeshire in the 1982 Minor Counties Championship against Lincolnshire. Rice played Minor counties cricket for Cambridgeshire from 1982 to 1988, including nine Minor Counties Championship matches and six MCCA Knockout Trophy matches. In 1982, he made his List A debut against Warwickshire in the NatWest Trophy. He played two further List A matches for Cambridgeshire, against Middlesex in 1983 and Warwickshire in 1988. In his three List A matches, he took 2 wickets at a bowling average of 83.00, with best figures of 1/31.
