= Eduardo Armella =

Argentine sports shooter

Personal information
- Full name: Eduardo Florentino Armella
- Born: 20 June 1928
- Died: 14 January 2011 (aged 82) Jujuy, Argentina

Sport
- Sport: Sports shooting

Eduardo Armella (20 June 1928 – 14 January 2011) was an Argentine sports shooter. He competed in the 50 metre rifle, three positions event at the 1964 Summer Olympics.
