= Nasser Sharifi =

Iranian sports shooter

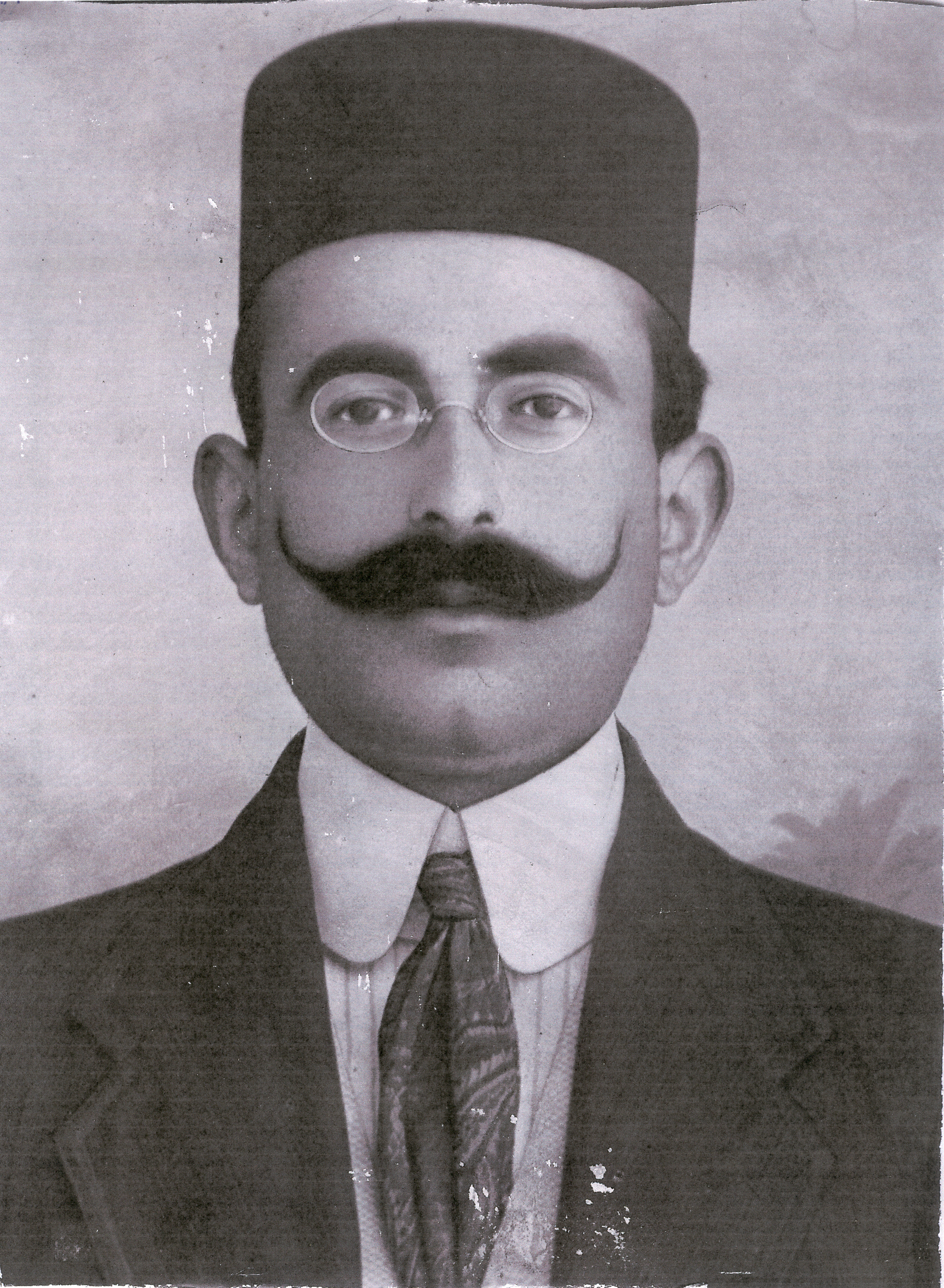

Personal information
- Born: 4 July 1921

Sport
- Sport: Sports shooting

Nasser Sharifi (Persian: ناصر شریفی; born 4 July 1921) is an Iranian former sports shooter. He competed in the 50 metre rifle, three positions event at the 1964 Summer Olympics.
