= Juan Thomas =

Spanish sports shooter

Personal information
- Full name: Juan Thomas Cabrelles
- Nationality: Spanish
- Born: 18 December 1926 Barcelona, Spain
- Died: 18 January 2017 (aged 90)

Sport
- Country: Spain
- Sport: Sports shooting

Juan Thomas Cabrelles (Note: In this Spanish name, the first or paternal surname is Thomas and the second or maternal family name is Cabrelles.) (18 December 1926 – 18 January 2017) was a Spanish sports shooter. He competed in the 25 metre pistol event at the 1964 Summer Olympics.
