= Gerhard Feller =

German sportsperson

Personal information
- Born: 9 January 1925 Giessen, Germany

Sport
- Sport: Sports shooting

Gerhard Feller (born 9 January 1925) is a German former sports shooter. He competed in the 25 metre pistol event at the 1964 Summer Olympics.
