= José Manuel Carpinteiro =

Portuguese sports shooter

Personal information
- Full name: José Manuel Cayola Carpinteiro
- Born: 1 October 1930

Sport
- Sport: Sports shooting

José Manuel Carpinteiro (born 1 October 1930) is a Portuguese former sports shooter. He competed in the 25 metre pistol event at the 1964 Summer Olympics.
