= Tibor Gonczol =

Australian sports shooter

Personal information
- Born: 19 January 1933
- Died: 2 January 2014 (aged 80)

Sport
- Sport: Sports shooting

Tibor Gonczol (19 January 1933 – 2 January 2014) was an Australian sports shooter. He competed in the 25 metre pistol event at the 1964 Summer Olympics.
