= Venezuela at the 1964 Summer Olympics =

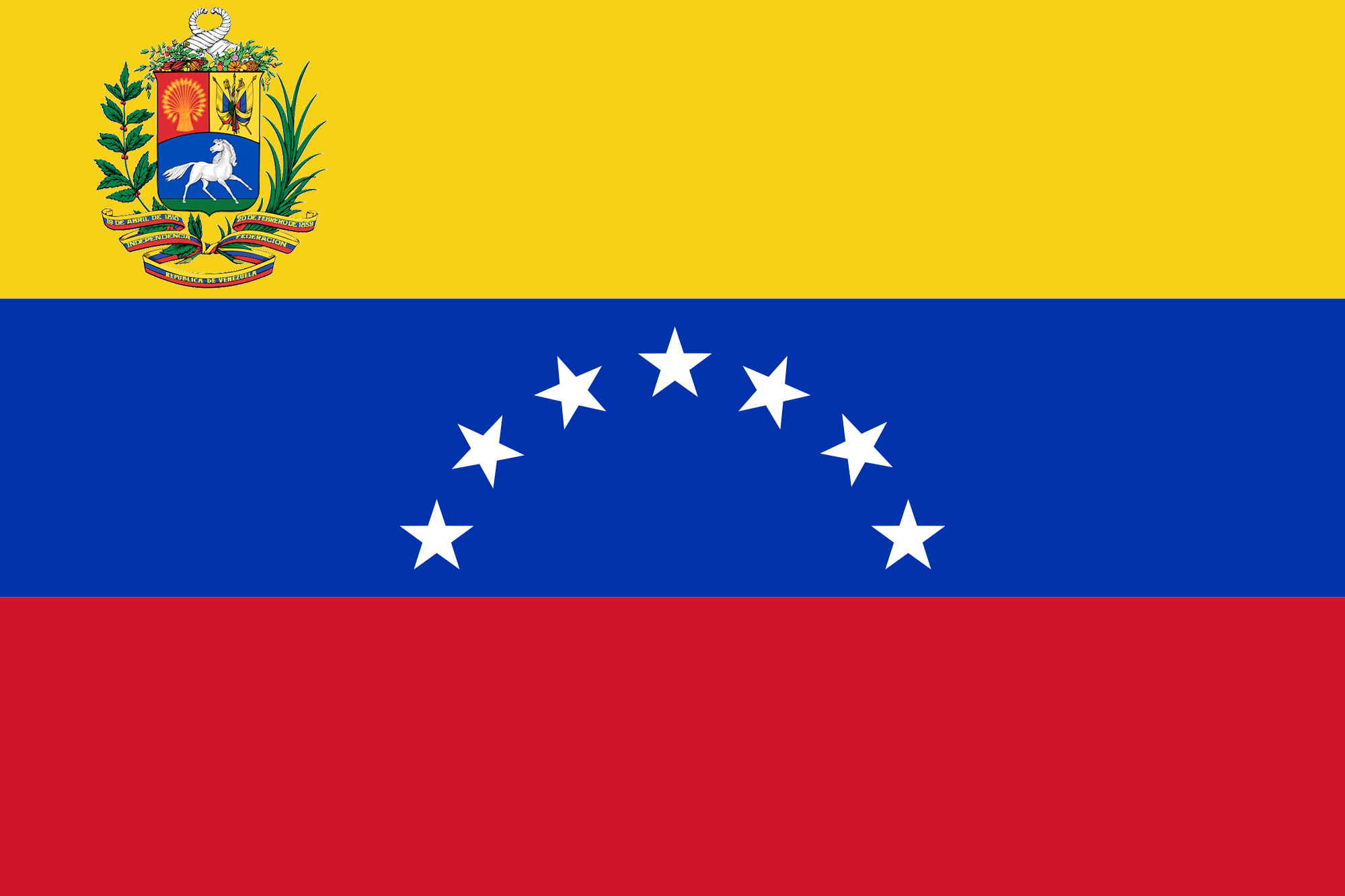
- IOC code: VEN
- NOC: Venezuelan Olympic Committee

in Tokyo
- Competitors: 16 in 5 sports
- Flag bearer: Theo Capriles
- Medals: Gold 0 Silver 0 Bronze 0 Total 0

Summer Olympics appearances (overview)
- 1948; 1952; 1956; 1960; 1964; 1968; 1972; 1976; 1980; 1984; 1988; 1992; 1996; 2000; 2004; 2008; 2012; 2016; 2020; 2024

Venezuela competed at the 1964 Summer Olympics in Tokyo, Japan. 16 competitors, 15 men and 1 woman, took part in 16 events in 5 sports.

== Athletics ==
- Arquímedes Herrera
- Rafael Romero
- Hortensio Fucil
- Lloyd Murad
- Héctor Thomas
- Víctor Maldonado

== Judo ==
- Jorge Lugo

== Sailing ==
- Francisco Danisis
- Juan Karsten
- Halblaud Karsten
- Daniel Camejo Octavio

== Shooting ==
Four shooters represented Venezuela in 1964.

25 m pistol

- José-Antonio Chalbaud

50 m pistol

- Edgar Espinoza

50 m rifle, prone

- Enrico Forcella
- Agustin Rangel

== Swimming ==
Men

Athlete	Event	Heat		Semifinal		Final	
Athlete	Event	Time	Rank	Time	Rank	Time	Rank
Téodoro Capriles	100 m freestyle	57.2	43	Did not advance			
Téodoro Capriles	400 m freestyle	4:44.5	42	—N/a		Did not advance	

Women

Athlete	Event	Heat		Semifinal		Final	
Athlete	Event	Time	Rank	Time	Rank	Time	Rank
Anneliese Rockenbach	100 m freestyle	1:04.3	22	Did not advance			
Anneliese Rockenbach	100 m backstroke	1:14.1	27	—N/a		Did not advance	
