= Swimming at the 1964 Summer Olympics – Women's 100 metre backstroke =

Women's 100 metre backstroke at the Games of the XVIII Olympiad
- Venue: Yoyogi National Gymnasium
- Dates: 13 October 1964 (heats); 14 October 1964 (final)
- Competitors: 31 from 17 nations
- Winning time: 1:07.7 WR

Medalists
| 1st place, gold medalist(s) | | Cathy Ferguson | United States |
| 2nd place, silver medalist(s) | | Kiki Caron | France |
| 3rd place, bronze medalist(s) | | Ginny Duenkel | United States |

The women's 100 metre backstroke event at the 1964 Olympic Games took place between October 13 and 14. This swimming event used backstroke. Because an Olympic-size swimming pool is 50 metres long, this race consisted of two lengths of the pool.

== Results ==
=== Heats ===
Heat 1

| Rank | Athlete | Country | Time | Note |
|---|---|---|---|---|
| 1 | Nina Harmer | United States | 1:09.8 | |
| 2 | Satoko Tanaka | Japan | 1:10.0 | |
| 3 | Linda Ludgrove | Great Britain | 1:10.3 | |
| 4 | Helga Schmidt-Neuber | Germany | 1:11.4 | |
| 5 | Helen Kennedy | Canada | 1:12.5 | |
| 6 | Belinda Woosley | Australia | 1:15.3 | |
| 7 | Jovina Tseng | Malaysia | 1:20.7 | |

Heat 2

| Rank | Athlete | Country | Time | Note |
|---|---|---|---|---|
| 1 | Ginny Duenkel | United States | 1:08.9 | |
| 2 | Eileen Weir | Canada | 1:09.7 | |
| 3 | Michiko Kihara | Japan | 1:11.1 | |
| 4 | Kirsten Michaelsen | Denmark | 1:11.2 | |
| 5 | Tatyana Savelyeva | Soviet Union | 1:11.8 | |
| 6 | Mária Balla-Lantos | Hungary | 1:12.0 | |
| 7 | Bep Weeteling | Netherlands | 1:13.1 | |
| 8 | Ursula Seitz | Austria | 1:13.3 | |

Heat 3

| Rank | Athlete | Country | Time | Note |
|---|---|---|---|---|
| 1 | Cathy Ferguson | United States | 1:08.8 | |
| 2 | Françoise Borie | France | 1:11.8 | |
| 3 | Petra Nerger | Germany | 1:12.1 | |
| 4 | Sylvia Lewis | Great Britain | 1:12.2 | |
| 5 | Ria van Velsen | Netherlands | 1:12.2 | |
| 6 | Marlene Dayman | Australia | 1:12.9 | |
| 7 | Anneliese Rockenbach | Venezuela | 1:14.1 | |
| 8 | Margaret Harding | Puerto Rico | 1:19.5 | |

Heat 4

| Rank | Athlete | Country | Time | Note |
|---|---|---|---|---|
| 1 | Kiki Caron | France | 1:08.5 | |
| 2 | Jill Norfolk | Great Britain | 1:10.6 | |
| 3 | Ingrid Schmidt | Germany | 1:11.1 | |
| 4 | Nataliya Mikhaylova | Soviet Union | 1:11.4 | |
| 5 | Corrie Winkel | Netherlands | 1:11.6 | |
| 6 | Nanette Duncan | Australia | 1:12.4 | |
| 7 | Susana Peper | Argentina | 1:13.2 | |
| 8 | Jeon Ok-ja | South Korea | 1:21.7 | |

=== Final ===
| Rank | Athlete | Country | Time | Notes |
|---|---|---|---|---|
| 1 | Cathy Ferguson | United States | 1:07.7 | WR |
| 2 | Kiki Caron | France | 1:07.9 | |
| 3 | Ginny Duenkel | United States | 1:08.0 | |
| 4 | Satoko Tanaka | Japan | 1:08.6 | |
| 5 | Nina Harmer | United States | 1:09.4 | |
| 6 | Linda Ludgrove | Great Britain | 1:09.5 | |
| 7 | Eileen Weir | Canada | 1:09.8 | |
| 8 | Jill Norfolk | Great Britain | 1:11.2 | |

Key: WR = World record
