= Deena Wigger =

American sport shooter (born 1966)

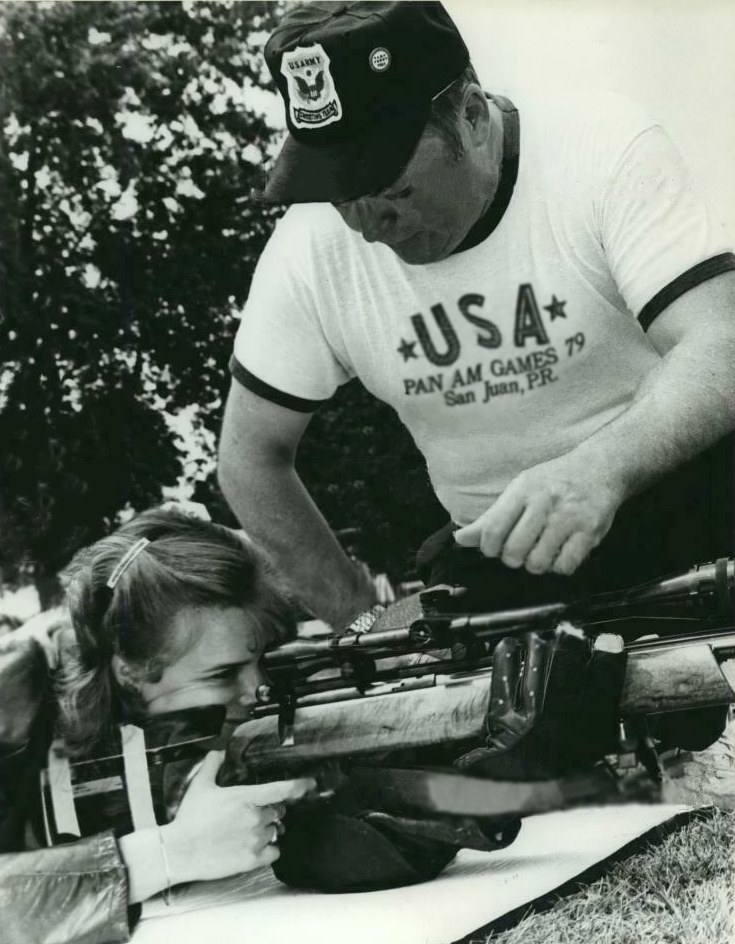
- Deena training with her father, circa 1980

Personal information
- Full name: Deena Lynn Wigger
- Born: August 27, 1966 (age 59) Great Falls, Montana, U.S.
- Height: 162 cm (5 ft 4 in)
- Weight: 51 kg (112 lb)

Sport
- Sport: Sports shooting
- Event: Rifle
- Coached by: Lones Wigger
Medal record
Representing United States
Pan American Games
Gold medal – first place	1983 Caracas	50 m prone, ind.
Gold medal – first place	1983 Caracas	50 m prone, team
Gold medal – first place	1987 Indianapolis	50 m prone, ind.
Bronze medal – third place	1987 Indianapolis	10 m air, ind.
Gold medal – first place	1995 Mar del Plata	50 m 3 positions, ind.
World Championships
Bronze medal – third place	1986 Suhl	10 m air, ind.
Bronze medal – third place	1986 Suhl	50 m 3 positions, team
Gold medal – first place	1990 Moscow	10 m air, team
Silver medal – second place	1990 Moscow	50 m 3 positions, ind.
Silver medal – second place	1990 Moscow	50 m 3 positions, team

Deena Lynn Wigger (born August 27, 1966) is a retired American sport shooter, she is the daughter of the Olympic shooter Lones Wigger. She placed 10th in the 10 m air rifle shooting event at the 1988 Summer Olympics.

Wigger won a total of four gold medals at the Pan American Games in 1983–1995. She also won one gold, two silver and two bronze medals at the 1986 and 1990 World Championships. In 1989 she broke the world record for air rifle with 389 of 400.

Wigger attended college at Murray State University in Kentucky, helping them win an NCAA team championship. After the 1988 Olympics, she joined the Wyoming Air National Guard, and then the US Air Force, where she served as a medical technician and an assistant shooting coach at the US Air Force Academy. In 1996 she was named the United States Air Force Athlete of the Year.
