= Alan Bray (sport shooter) =

British sports shooter (1929–2016)

Personal information
- Full name: Alan Herbert Bray
- Born: 19 June 1929 Hinckley, Leicestershire, England
- Died: 8 October 2016 (aged 87) Barwell, Leicestershire, England

Sport
- Sport: Sports shooting

Alan Herbert Bray (19 June 1929 – 8 October 2016) was a British sports shooter. He competed in the 25 metre pistol event at the 1964 Summer Olympics.

In 1987, Bray was subjected to a horrific attack by thieves who targeted the gun shop he owned. He was doused in petrol and set alight leaving him with burn injuries he suffered with until his death. The attack was featured on the popular television show Crimewatch which resulted in the perpetrators being caught and imprisoned.
