= Gheorghe Bădără =

Romanian cyclist

Personal information
- Born: 16 August 1941 (age 85)

Cycling career
- Sport: Cycling

Gheorghe Bădără (born 16 August 1941) is a former Romanian cyclist. He competed in the individual road race and team time trial events at the 1964 Summer Olympics.
