= William Schreiber (volleyball) =

Romanian volleyball player (born 1942)

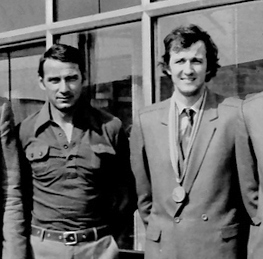
- Schreiber (left)

Personal information
- Born: 10 February 1942 (age 84) Reşiţa, Romania
- Height: 189 cm (6 ft 2 in)
- Weight: 85 kg (187 lb)

Sport
- Sport: Volleyball
- Club: CS Dinamo București

William Schreiber (born 10 February 1942) is a retired Romanian volleyball player. He was part of the Romanian national team that placed fifth at the 1972 Summer Olympics.
