= Lee Jong-hyeon =

South Korean sport shooter (born 1930)

Personal information
- Born: 8 May 1930 Wonsan, South Hamgyeong

Sport
- Sport: Sports shooting
- Team: ROK Marine Corps

Korean name
- Hangul: 이종현
- Hanja: 李鍾絃
- RR: I Jonghyeon
- MR: I Chonghyŏn

Lee Jong-hyeon (born 8 May 1930) is a South Korean former sports shooter. He competed in the 25 metre pistol event at the 1964 Summer Olympics.
