= Lones Wigger =

Sport shooter and soldier (1937–2017)

Lones Wigger Jr.
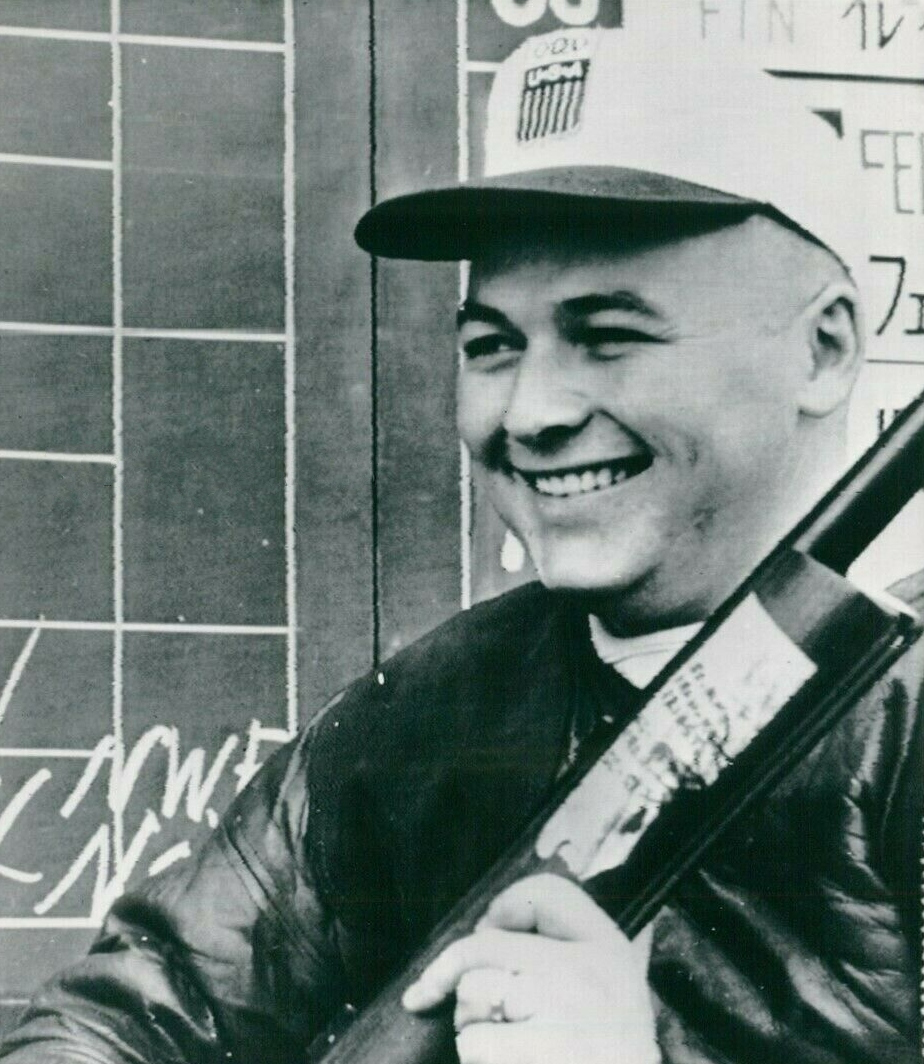
- Wigger in 1964

Personal information
- Full name: Lones Wesley Wigger Jr.
- Nationality: American
- Born: August 25, 1937 Great Falls, Montana, U.S.
- Died: December 14, 2017 (aged 80) Colorado Springs, Colorado, U.S.
- Height: 170 cm (5 ft 7 in)
- Weight: 82 kg (181 lb)

Sport
- Sport: Sports shooting
- Event: Rifle
- Club: US Army
Medal record
Representing United States
Olympic Games
Gold medal – first place	1964 Tokyo	50 m 3 positions
Gold medal – first place	1972 Munich	300 m free rifle
Silver medal – second place	1964 Tokyo	50 m rifle prone
Pan American Games
Gold medal – first place	1963 São Paulo	50 m prone, team
Silver medal – second place	1963 São Paulo	50 m prone, ind.
Silver medal – second place	1971 Cali	50 m prone, 3 pos.
Silver medal – second place	1975 Mexico City	50 m prone, 3 pos.
Gold medal – first place	1979 San Juan	50 m prone, 3 pos
Gold medal – first place	1979 San Juan	50 m prone, ind.
Gold medal – first place	1979 San Juan	50 m prone, team
Gold medal – first place	1983 Caracas	50 m prone, 3 pos.
Gold medal – first place	1983 Caracas	50 m prone, team
Gold medal – first place	1983 Caracas	50 m prone, HP 3 pos.
Gold medal – first place	1983 Caracas	50 m prone, HP 3 pos. team
Silver medal – second place	1983 Caracas	50 m prone, ind.
Silver medal – second place	1983 Caracas	50 m prone, high-P

Lones Wesley Wigger Jr. (August 25, 1937, Great Falls, Montana – December 14, 2017, Colorado Springs, Colorado) was an American sports shooter. Wigger was a member of the United States Olympic team on three occasions, winning two Olympic Gold Medals. He also served in the U.S. Army as a lieutenant colonel.

Wigger is often regarded as having been the greatest competitive rifle shooter ever to have taken aim for the United States. He made every Olympic Shooting Team between 1968 and 1980, he held or co-held 27 world records – 14 team and 13 individual. He won 58 National Championships of almost every variety beginning in 1963. He was a member of 16 major U.S. international teams, starting with the 1963 Pan-American Games and his record includes: 22 World Championships (two individual, 20 team); seven Pan-American titles; 18 victories in the Championship of the Americas meet; 16 victories in the Council Internationale Sport du Militaire meet; and in those four meets, plus the Olympics, he won 108 medals.

Wigger was a member of the Olympic shooting team in 1964, 1968, 1972 and 1980. The 1964 effort resulted in a gold medal. He won the gold for the three position small-bore rifle with a score of 1164, and also won a silver medal for small-bore rifle, prone position with a score of 597. He ran the 23rd Infantry Division Sniper School in Vietnam in 1971, and won the gold medal for free rifle, 3 position, with a score of 1155 in 1972.

Wigger was on the United States Army Marksmanship Unit, and competed in international matches representing the United States for 20 years. He was inducted into the Olympic Hall of Fame in June 2008.

== Family ==
He was married to MaryKay Wigger. Lones Wigger's daughter, Deena Wigger, was on the 1988 Olympic air rifle squad. His son, Ron, served as the head rifle coach of the West Point rifle team for fourteen seasons. Under him, the team qualified for the championships in nine seasons, capturing the title in 2005, bronze in 2006 and silver for two years after that. Wigger has 3 grandchildren, Alicia, Karina and Michelle. His other son, Danny, is an accomplished Smallbore Rifle Prone Shooter.

== Death ==
Lones Wigger died in the evening of December 14, 2017 at his home in Colorado Springs, Colorado of complications from pancreatic cancer.

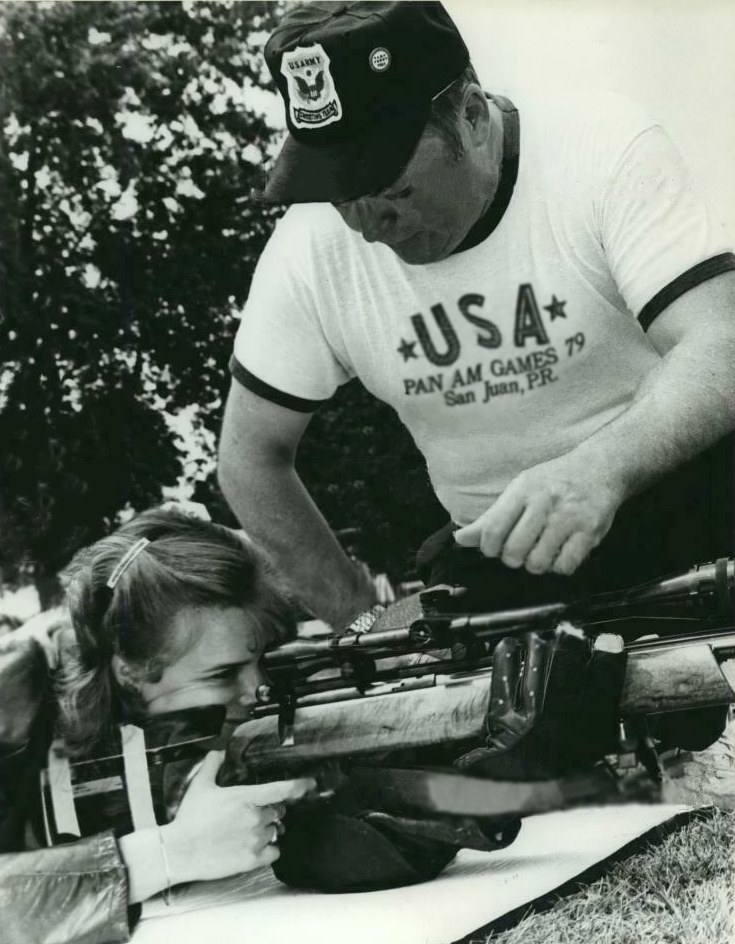
Deena and Lones Wigger
