= Kim Chang-hwan =

South Korean fencer (born 1916)

Personal information
- Born: 24 September 1916

Sport
- Sport: Fencing

Korean name
- Hangul: 김창환
- Hanja: 金昌煥
- RR: Gim Changhwan
- MR: Kim Ch'anghwan

Kim Chang-hwan (24 September 1916 – ?) was a South Korean fencer. He competed in the team foil and épée events at the 1964 Summer Olympics. Kim is deceased.
