= Belinda Woosley =

Australian swimmer

Personal information
- Nationality: Australian
- Born: 20 May 1948 (age 78) Coorparoo, Queensland, Australia

Sport
- Sport: Swimming
- College team: Presbyterian Ladies' College, Perth

Belinda Woosley (born 20 May 1948) is an Australian swimmer. She competed in the women's 100 metre backstroke at the 1964 Summer Olympics.

Belinda Woosley was born 20 May 1948 in Coorparoo, Queensland. Her family moved to Perth, Western Australia, where she studied at Presbyterian Ladies' College, Perth. At the age of sixteen she was selected to represent Australia at the 1964 Summer Olympics in Tokyo, where she came sixth in her heat of the women's 100 metre backstroke.

She married David Arthur Foley on 23 June 1967 in Perth, and they have two sons.

Between 1978 and 1979 she was a member of the Melville Marlins swim club and also served as their captain. During her swimming career, she held six state records. In 2009, she was inducted into the Swimming WA Hall of Fame.
