= Alan Rice (cricketer) =

English cricketer

Personal information
- Full name: Alan Sedgwick Rice
- Born: 29 August 1929 (age 97); Leicester, Leicestershire, England
- Batting: Left-handed
- Bowling: Right-arm fast-medium
- Relatives: David Rice (son) Gary Rice (son) Jenny Rice (Daughter)

Domestic team information
- Years: Team
- 1954: Leicestershire

Career statistics
Competition	First-class
Matches	3
Runs scored	15
Batting average	7.50
100s/50s	–/–
Top score	13
Balls bowled	456
Wickets	8
Bowling average	33.62
5 wickets in innings	–
10 wickets in match	–
Best bowling	3/34
Catches/stumpings	1/–
- Source: Cricinfo, 15 April 2011

Alan Sedgwick Rice (born 29 August 1929) is a former English cricketer. Rice was a right-handed batsman who bowled right-arm fast-medium. He was born in Leicester, Leicestershire.

Rice made his first-class debut for Leicestershire in 1954 against Middlesex at Lord's. Rice played two further first-class matches for Leicestershire, both coming in 1954 against Somerset and Middlesex. In his three first-class matches, he scored 15 runs at a batting average of 7.50, with a high score of 13. With the ball he claimed 8 wickets at a bowling average of 33.62, with best figures of 3/34.

His son, Gary, played Minor counties and List A cricket for Cambridgeshire.
