= José-Antonio Chalbaud =

Venezuelan sports shooter (born 1931)

Personal information
- Born: 2 July 1931 (age 94)

Sport
- Sport: Sports shooting

José-Antonio Chalbaud (born 2 July 1931) is a Venezuelan former sports shooter. He competed in the 25 metre pistol event at the 1964 Summer Olympics.
