= Davila Plocon =

Romanian volleyball player (1931–2006)

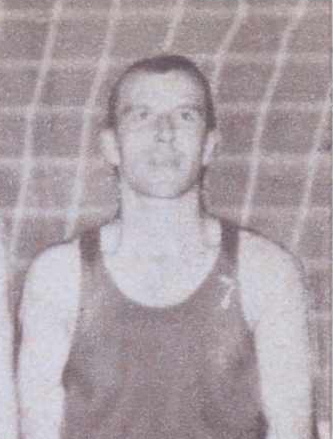
- Plocon in 1963

Personal information
- Nationality: Romanian
- Born: 28 July 1931 Slatina, Romania
- Died: 2006 (aged 74–75)

Sport
- Sport: Volleyball

Davila Plocon (28 July 1931 – 2006) was a Romanian volleyball player. He competed in the men's tournament at the 1964 Summer Olympics.
