= Jeon Ok-ja =

South Korean swimmer

Personal information
- Born: 13 April 1948 (age 78)

Sport
- Sport: Swimming

Jeon Ok-ja (born 13 April 1948) is a South Korean former swimmer. She competed in the women's 100 metre backstroke at the 1964 Summer Olympics.
