= Hansruedi Schneider =

Swiss sports shooter (1926–2017)

Personal information
- Born: 22 December 1926 Unterseen, Switzerland
- Died: 6 June 2017 (aged 90)

Sport
- Sport: Sports shooting

Hansruedi Schneider (22 December 1926 – 6 June 2017) was a Swiss sports shooter. He competed at the 1960 Summer Olympics and the 1964 Summer Olympics.
