= Kim Man-sig =

South Korean fencer (1940–2013)

Personal information
- Born: 30 December 1940 Ulsan, South Korea
- Died: 18 January 2013 (aged 72) Eugene, Oregon, U.S.

Sport
- Sport: Fencing

Korean name
- Hangul: 김만식
- Hanja: 金萬植
- RR: Gim Mansik
- MR: Kim Mansik

Kim Man-sig (30 December 1940 – 18 January 2013) was a South Korean fencer. He competed in the individual and team foil and épée events at the 1964 Summer Olympics.
