= Han Myung-seok =

South Korean fencer

Han Myeong-seok
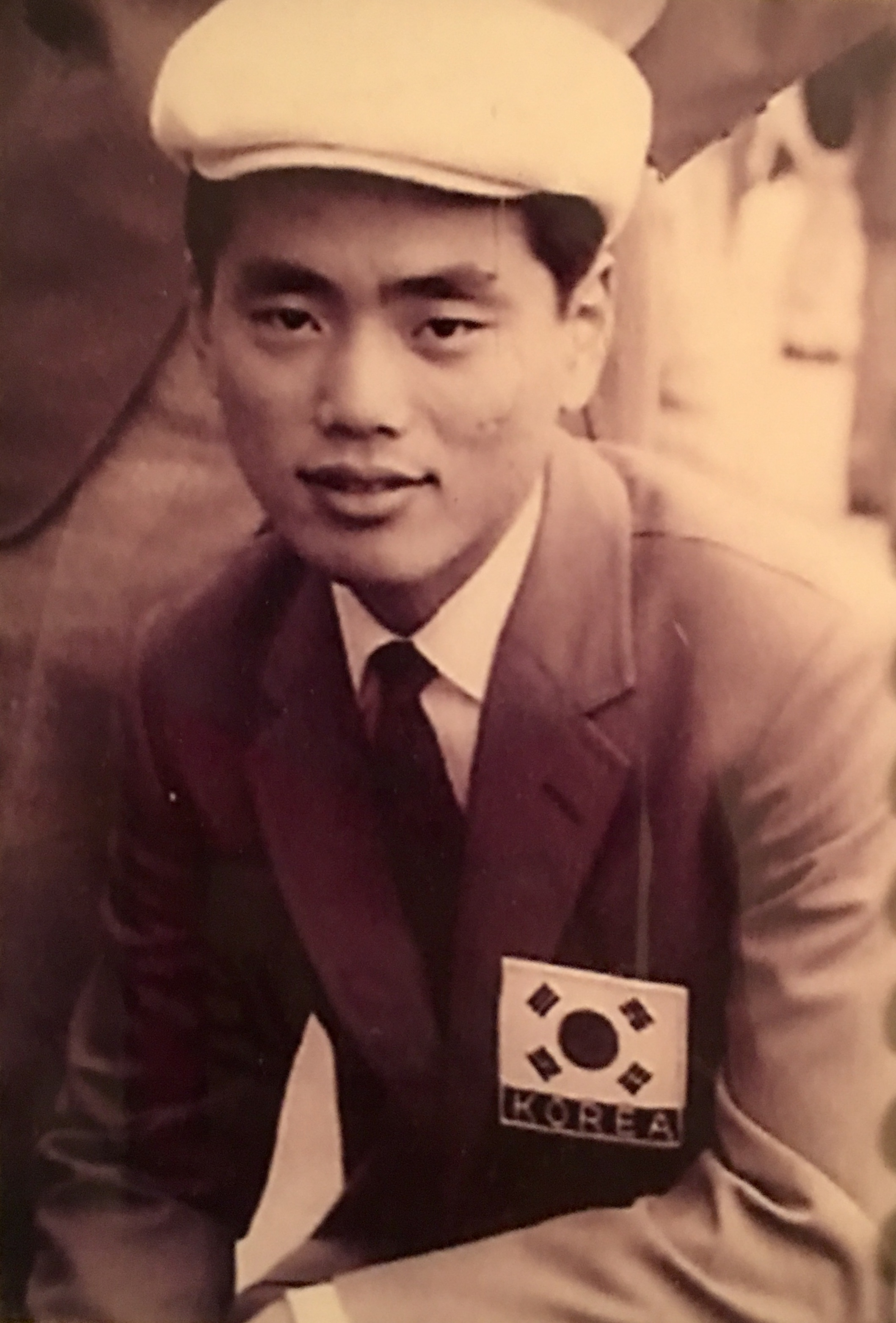
- Han Myung-seok in 1964

Personal information
- Born: 15 July 1944 (age 81)
- Height: 5 ft 7 in (170 cm)
- Weight: 135 lb (61 kg)

Sport
- Country: South Korea
- Sport: Fencing

Han Myeong-seok (born 15 July 1944) is a South Korean fencer. He competed in the individual and team foil and épée events at the 1964 Summer Olympics.
