= Constantin Ciocan =

Romanian cyclist

Personal information
- Born: 28 July 1943 (age 83) Câmpina, Prahova, Romania

Cycling career
- Sport: Cycling

Constantin Ciocan (born 28 July 1943) is a former Romanian cyclist. He competed in the individual road race and team time trial events at the 1964 Summer Olympics.
