= Sin Du-ho =

South Korean fencer

Personal information
- Born: 13 October 1934 (age 91) Cheongwon, North Chungcheong, South Korea

Sport
- Sport: Fencing
- College team: Hankuk University of Foreign Studies
- Team: Korea Coal Corporation

Achievements and titles

Korean name
- Hangul: 신두호
- Hanja: 申斗浩
- RR: Sin Duho
- MR: Sin Tuho

Sin Du-ho (born 13 October 1934) is a South Korean fencer. He competed in the individual and team foil and épée events at the 1964 Summer Olympics.
