= Kiki Caron =

French swimmer (born 1948)

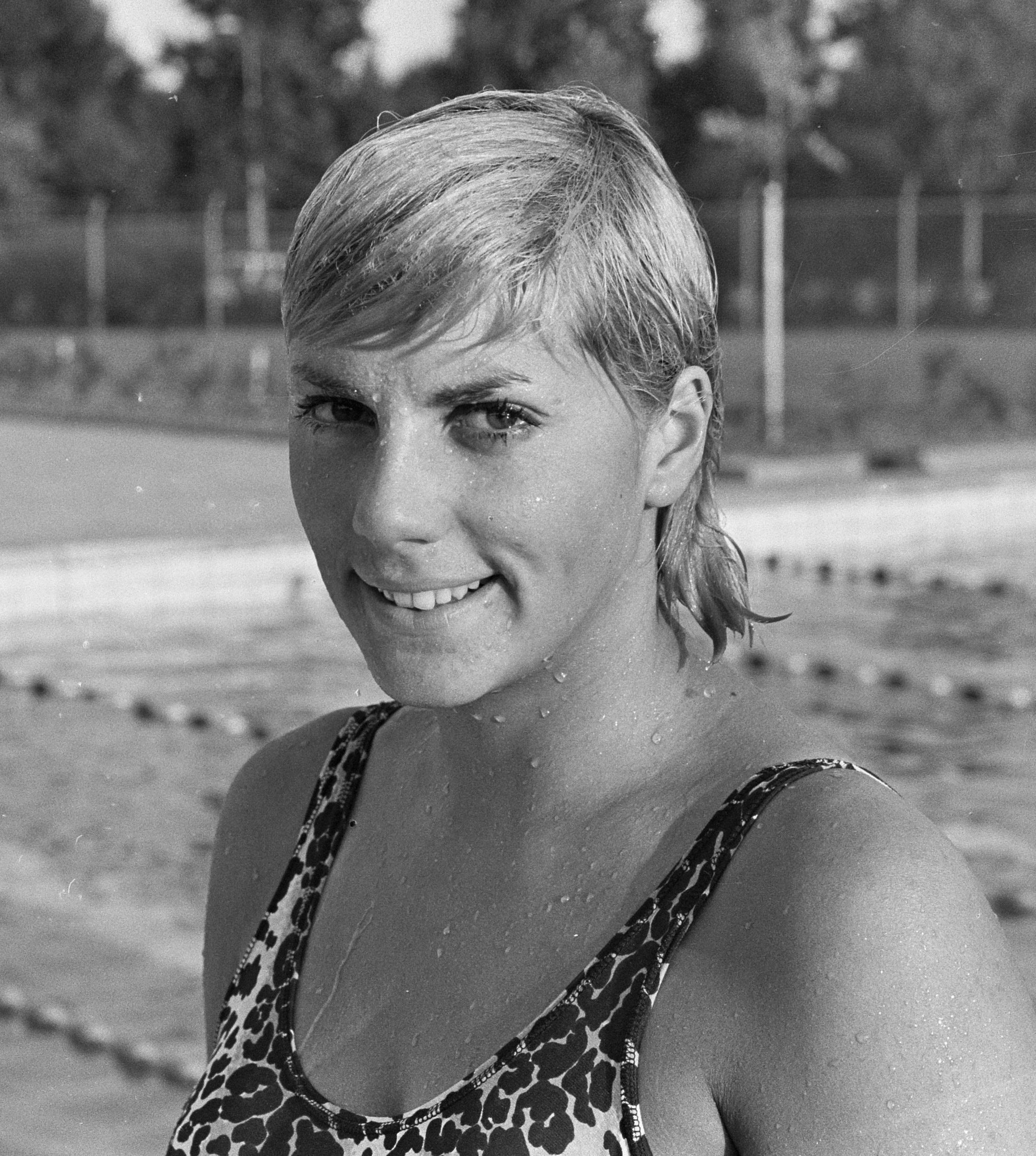
- Christine Caron in 1966

Medal record

Women's swimming

Representing France

Olympic Games
Silver medal – second place	1964 Tokyo	100 m backstroke

European Championships
Gold medal – first place	1966 Utrecht	100 m backstroke

Christine "Kiki" Caron (born 10 July 1948 in Paris) is a French former backstroke swimmer. She won the silver medal in 100 m backstroke at the 1964 Summer Olympics and the gold medal in the same event at the 1966 European Aquatics Championships. She also participated in the 1968 Summer Olympics where she was the first woman to carry the French flag at the opening ceremony. During her swimming career she won 29 national swimming titles. Her elder sister Annie was also a swimmer and competed at the 1960 Olympics.

After retiring from swimming she acted in two films: Le lys de mer (1969) and Violentata sulla sabbia (1971). In 1998, Caron was inducted into the International Swimming Hall of Fame. In 2005, she was named Chevalier de la Legion of Honour. During the next year she published an autobiography titled Kiki with a preface written by Johnny Hallyday.

== See also ==
- List of members of the International Swimming Hall of Fame
