= Lubomír Nácovský =

Czech sport shooter

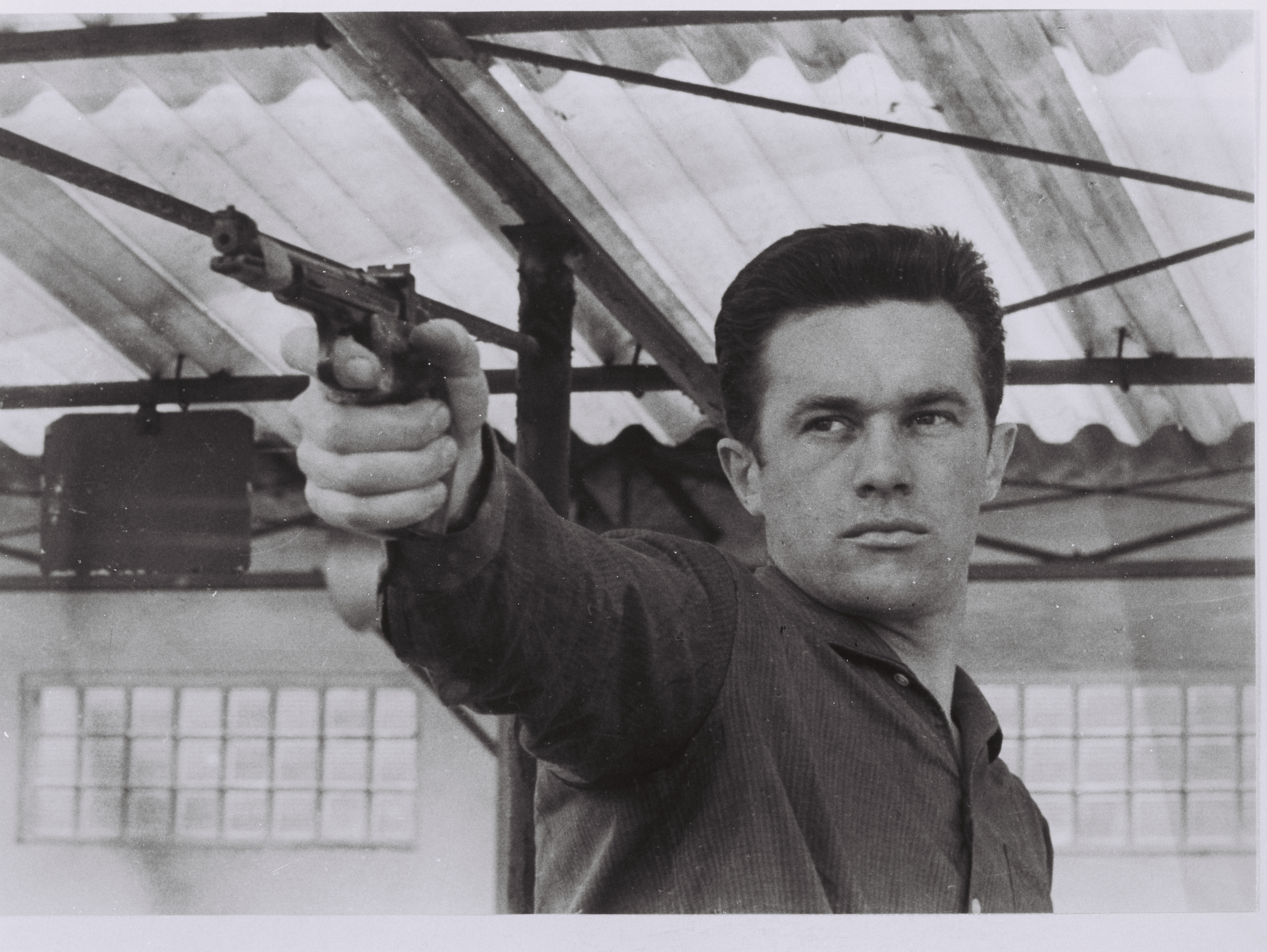
- Lubomír Nácovský in 1969

Personal information
- Born: 26 May 1935 Kralupy nad Vltavou, Czechoslovakia
- Died: 10 March 1982 (aged 46) Kralupy nad Vltavou, Czechoslovakia

Sport
- Sport: Sports shooting
Medal record
Men's shooting
Representing Czechoslovakia
Olympic Games
Bronze medal – third place	1964 Tokyo	rapid fire pistol

Lubomír Nácovský (26 May 1935 – 10 March 1982 in Kralupy nad Vltavou) was a Czech sport shooter who competed in the 1964 Summer Olympics and in the 1968 Summer Olympics. He won a bronze medal in the rapid fire pistol at the 1964 Summer Olympics.
