= Velichko Velichkov (sport shooter) =

Bulgarian sport shooter

Personal information
- Born: 10 April 1934 Pleven, Bulgaria
- Died: 27 October 1982 (aged 48)

Sport
- Sport: Sports shooting
Medal record
Men's shooting
Representing Bulgaria
Olympic Games
Silver medal – second place	1964 Tokyo	50m rifle, three positions

Velichko Velichkov (Bulgarian: Величко Величков; 10 April 1934 – 27 October 1982) was a Bulgarian sports shooter. He won a silver medal in the 50 metre rifle, three positions event at the 1964 Summer Olympics. He also competed at the 1960 Summer Olympics and the 1968 Summer Olympics.
