= Ion Olărescu =

Romanian sports shooter

Personal information
- Born: 11 June 1943 (age 83) Bucharest, Romania

Sport
- Sport: Sports shooting

Ion Olărescu (born 11 June 1943) is a Romanian former sports shooter. He competed at the 1964 Summer Olympics and the 1968 Summer Olympics.
