= O Cheong-ja =

South Korean volleyball player (born 1944)

Personal information
- Nationality: South Korean
- Born: 14 September 1944 (age 80)

Sport
- Sport: Volleyball

O Cheong-ja (born 14 September 1944) is a South Korean volleyball player. She competed in the women's tournament at the 1964 Summer Olympics.
