= Lee Keun-soo =

South Korean volleyball player (born 1946)

Personal information
- Nationality: South Korean
- Born: 9 July 1946 (age 78)

Sport
- Sport: Volleyball

Lee Keun-soo (born 9 July 1946) is a South Korean volleyball player. She competed in the women's tournament at the 1964 Summer Olympics.
