= Cornelia Lăzeanu =

Romanian volleyball player (born 1943)

Personal information
- Nationality: Romanian
- Born: 22 June 1943 (age 81); Craiova, Romania

Sport
- Sport: Volleyball

Cornelia Lăzeanu (born 22 June 1943) is a Romanian volleyball player. She competed in the women's tournament at the 1964 Summer Olympics.
