= Elisabeta Goloșie =

Romanian volleyball player

Personal information
- Nationality: Romanian
- Born: 20 June 1936 (age 88)

Sport
- Sport: Volleyball

Elisabeta Goloșie (born 20 June 1936) is a Romanian volleyball player. She competed in the women's tournament at the 1964 Summer Olympics.
