= O Sun-ok =

South Korean volleyball player (born 1945)

Personal information
- Nationality: South Korean
- Born: 16 November 1945 (age 79)

Korean name
- Hangul: 오순옥
- Hanja: 吳順玉
- RR: O Sunok
- MR: O Sunok

Sport
- Sport: Volleyball

O Sun-ok (born 16 November 1945) is a South Korean volleyball player. She competed in the women's tournament at the 1964 Summer Olympics.

O attended Namsung Girls' High School, and while studying there was named to the national junior team in 1963 to compete in an Asian Volleyball Confederation youth tournament held in Seoul. In 1964 she played for the Korea First Bank team.
