= Leonard Bull =

Kenyan sports shooter

Personal information
- Born: 25 January 1935 London, England
- Died: 23 November 2013 (aged 78)

Sport
- Sport: Sports shooting

Leonard Bull (25 January 1935 – 23 November 2013) was a Kenyan sports shooter. He competed at the 1964, 1968 and 1972 Summer Olympics.
