= Alan Handford-Rice =

Kenyan sports shooter

Personal information
- Born: 19 September 1925 Erpingham, Norfolk, England
- Died: December 2000 (aged 75) Torbay, Devon, England

Sport
- Sport: Sports shooting

Alan Handford-Rice (19 September 1925 – December 2000) was a Kenyan sports shooter. He competed in the 25 metre pistol event at the 1964 Summer Olympics.
