= Yun Jeong-suk (volleyball) =

South Korean volleyball player (born 1948)

Personal information
- Nationality: South Korean
- Born: 2 January 1948 (age 78)

Sport
- Sport: Volleyball

Yun Jeong-suk (born 2 January 1948) is a South Korean volleyball player. She competed in the women's tournament at the 1964 Summer Olympics.
