= Ion Tripșa =

Romanian sport shooter

Marcel Roșca
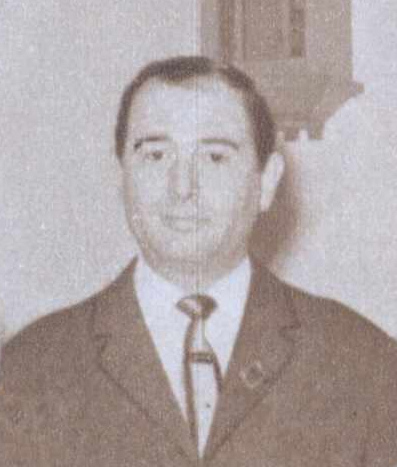

Personal information
- Born: 30 March 1934 Alba Iulia, Romania
- Died: 2001 (aged 66–67)

Sport
- Sport: Sports shooting
Medal record
Men's shooting
Representing Romania
Olympic Games
Silver medal – second place	1964 Tokyo	rapid fire pistol

Ion Tripşa (30 March 1934 – 2001) was a Romanian sport shooter who competed in the 1964 Summer Olympics and in the 1972 Summer Olympics. He won a silver medal in the rapid fire pistol event at the 1964 Summer Olympics.

He also won team silver medals in the 25 metre rapid fire pistol at the Wiesbaden World Championships in 1966 and at the 1970 World Championships in Phoenix, USA.
