= Choi Don-hui =

South Korean volleyball player (born 1945)

Personal information
- Nationality: South Korean
- Born: 10 December 1945 (age 79)

Sport
- Sport: Volleyball

Choi Don-hui (born December 10, 1945) is a South Korean volleyball player. She participated in the women's tournament during the 1964 Summer Olympics.
