= Kim Gil-ja =

South Korean volleyball player (born 1943)

Personal information
- Nationality: South Korean
- Born: 23 September 1943 (age 81)

Sport
- Sport: Volleyball

Kim Gil-ja (born 23 September 1943) is a South Korean volleyball player. She competed in the women's tournament at the 1964 Summer Olympics.
