= Gwag Yong-ja =

South Korean volleyball player (born 1947)

Personal information
- Nationality: South Korean
- Born: 24 September 1947 (age 77)

Sport
- Sport: Volleyball

Gwag Yong-ja (born 24 September 1947) is a South Korean volleyball player. She competed in the women's tournament at the 1964 Summer Olympics.
