= Moon Kyung-sook =

South Korean volleyball player (born 1945)

Personal information
- Nationality: South Korean
- Born: 5 February 1945 (age 80)

Sport
- Sport: Volleyball

Moon Kyung-sook (born 5 February 1945) is a South Korean volleyball player. She competed at the 1964 Summer Olympics and the 1968 Summer Olympics.
