= Doina Popescu =

Romanian volleyball player

Personal information
- Nationality: Romanian
- Born: 1 October 1938 (age 88) Codlea, Romania

Sport
- Sport: Volleyball

Doina Popescu (born 1 October 1938) is a Romanian volleyball player. She competed in the women's tournament at the 1964 Summer Olympics.
