= Hong Nam-sun =

South Korean volleyball player (born 1945)

Personal information
- Nationality: South Korean
- Born: 11 February 1945 (age 80)

Sport
- Sport: Volleyball

Hong Nam-sun (born 11 February 1945) is a South Korean volleyball player. She competed in the women's tournament at the 1964 Summer Olympics.
