= Jeong Jeong-eun =

South Korean volleyball player (born 1945)

Personal information
- Nationality: South Korean
- Born: 18 July 1945 (age 79)

Sport
- Sport: Volleyball

Jeong Jeong-eun (born 18 July 1945) is a South Korean volleyball player. She competed in the women's tournament at the 1964 Summer Olympics.
