= List of Olympic medalists in judo =

The following is the list of Olympic medalists in the sport of judo.

== Men ==
=== Extra lightweight ===
- 60 kg

Games	Gold	Silver	Bronze
1980 Moscow	Thierry Rey; France	José Rodríguez; Cuba	Tibor Kincses; Hungary
1980 Moscow	Thierry Rey; France	José Rodríguez; Cuba	Aramby Emizh; Soviet Union
1984 Los Angeles	Shinji Hosokawa; Japan	Kim Jae-yup; South Korea	Neil Eckersley; Great Britain
1984 Los Angeles	Shinji Hosokawa; Japan	Kim Jae-yup; South Korea	Edward Liddie; United States
1988 Seoul	Kim Jae-yup; South Korea	Kevin Asano; United States	Shinji Hosokawa; Japan
1988 Seoul	Kim Jae-yup; South Korea	Kevin Asano; United States	Amiran Totikashvili; Soviet Union
1992 Barcelona	Nazim Huseynov; Unified Team	Yoon Hyun; South Korea	Tadanori Koshino; Japan
1992 Barcelona	Nazim Huseynov; Unified Team	Yoon Hyun; South Korea	Richard Trautmann; Germany
1996 Atlanta	Tadahiro Nomura; Japan	Girolamo Giovinazzo; Italy	Dorjpalamyn Narmandakh; Mongolia
1996 Atlanta	Tadahiro Nomura; Japan	Girolamo Giovinazzo; Italy	Richard Trautmann; Germany
2000 Sydney	Tadahiro Nomura; Japan	Jung Bu-kyung; South Korea	Manolo Poulot; Cuba
2000 Sydney	Tadahiro Nomura; Japan	Jung Bu-kyung; South Korea	Aidyn Smagulov; Kyrgyzstan
2004 Athens	Tadahiro Nomura; Japan	Nestor Khergiani; Georgia	Khashbaataryn Tsagaanbaatar; Mongolia
2004 Athens	Tadahiro Nomura; Japan	Nestor Khergiani; Georgia	Choi Min-ho; South Korea
2008 Beijing	Choi Min-Ho; South Korea	Ludwig Paischer; Austria	Rishod Sobirov; Uzbekistan
2008 Beijing	Choi Min-Ho; South Korea	Ludwig Paischer; Austria	Ruben Houkes; Netherlands
2012 London	Arsen Galstyan; Russia	Hiroaki Hiraoka; Japan	Felipe Kitadai; Brazil
2012 London	Arsen Galstyan; Russia	Hiroaki Hiraoka; Japan	Rishod Sobirov; Uzbekistan
2016 Rio de Janeiro	Beslan Mudranov; Russia	Yeldos Smetov; Kazakhstan	Naohisa Takato; Japan
2016 Rio de Janeiro	Beslan Mudranov; Russia	Yeldos Smetov; Kazakhstan	Diyorbek Urozboev; Uzbekistan
2020 Tokyo	Naohisa Takato; Japan	Yang Yung-wei; Chinese Taipei	Luka Mkheidze; France
2020 Tokyo	Naohisa Takato; Japan	Yang Yung-wei; Chinese Taipei	Yeldos Smetov; Kazakhstan
2024 Paris	Yeldos Smetov; Kazakhstan	Luka Mkheidze; France	Ryuju Nagayama; Japan
2024 Paris	Yeldos Smetov; Kazakhstan	Luka Mkheidze; France	Francisco Garrigós; Spain
2028 Los Angeles			

=== Half lightweight ===
- 65 kg (1980–1996)
- 66 kg (2000–)

Games	Gold	Silver	Bronze
1980 Moscow	Nikolay Solodukhin; Soviet Union	Tsendiin Damdin; Mongolia	Iliyan Nedkov; Bulgaria
1980 Moscow	Nikolay Solodukhin; Soviet Union	Tsendiin Damdin; Mongolia	Janusz Pawłowski; Poland
1984 Los Angeles	Yoshiyuki Matsuoka; Japan	Hwang Jung-oh; South Korea	Marc Alexandre; France
1984 Los Angeles	Yoshiyuki Matsuoka; Japan	Hwang Jung-oh; South Korea	Josef Reiter; Austria
1988 Seoul	Lee Kyung-keun; South Korea	Janusz Pawłowski; Poland	Bruno Carabetta; France
1988 Seoul	Lee Kyung-keun; South Korea	Janusz Pawłowski; Poland	Yosuke Yamamoto; Japan
1992 Barcelona	Rogério Sampaio; Brazil	József Csák; Hungary	Israel Hernández; Cuba
1992 Barcelona	Rogério Sampaio; Brazil	József Csák; Hungary	Udo Quellmalz; Germany
1996 Atlanta	Udo Quellmalz; Germany	Yukimasa Nakamura; Japan	Henrique Guimarães; Brazil
1996 Atlanta	Udo Quellmalz; Germany	Yukimasa Nakamura; Japan	Israel Hernández; Cuba
2000 Sydney	Hüseyin Özkan; Turkey	Larbi Benboudaoud; France	Girolamo Giovinazzo; Italy
2000 Sydney	Hüseyin Özkan; Turkey	Larbi Benboudaoud; France	Giorgi Vazagashvili; Georgia
2004 Athens	Masato Uchishiba; Japan	Jozef Krnáč; Slovakia	Yordanis Arencibia; Cuba
2004 Athens	Masato Uchishiba; Japan	Jozef Krnáč; Slovakia	Georgi Georgiev; Bulgaria
2008 Beijing	Masato Uchishiba; Japan	Benjamin Darbelet; France	Yordanis Arencibia; Cuba
2008 Beijing	Masato Uchishiba; Japan	Benjamin Darbelet; France	Pak Chol-Min; North Korea
2012 London	Lasha Shavdatuashvili; Georgia	Miklós Ungvári; Hungary	Masashi Ebinuma; Japan
2012 London	Lasha Shavdatuashvili; Georgia	Miklós Ungvári; Hungary	Cho Jun-ho; South Korea
2016 Rio de Janeiro	Fabio Basile; Italy	An Baul; South Korea	Rishod Sobirov; Uzbekistan
2016 Rio de Janeiro	Fabio Basile; Italy	An Baul; South Korea	Masashi Ebinuma; Japan
2020 Tokyo	Hifumi Abe; Japan	Vazha Margvelashvili; Georgia	An Baul; South Korea
2020 Tokyo	Hifumi Abe; Japan	Vazha Margvelashvili; Georgia	Daniel Cargnin; Brazil
2024 Paris	Hifumi Abe; Japan	Willian Lima; Brazil	Gusman Kyrgyzbayev; Kazakhstan
2024 Paris	Hifumi Abe; Japan	Willian Lima; Brazil	Denis Vieru; Moldova
2028 Los Angeles			

=== Lightweight ===
- 68 kg (1964)
- 63 kg (1972–1976)
- 71 kg (1980–1996)
- 73 kg (2000–)

Games	Gold	Silver	Bronze
1964 Tokyo	Takehide Nakatani; Japan	Eric Hänni; Switzerland	Ārons Bogoļubovs; Soviet Union
1964 Tokyo	Takehide Nakatani; Japan	Eric Hänni; Switzerland	Oleg Stepanov; Soviet Union
1968 Mexico City	not included in the Olympic program		
1972 Munich	Takao Kawaguchi; Japan	none awarded	Kim Yong-ik; North Korea
1972 Munich	Takao Kawaguchi; Japan	none awarded	Jean-Jacques Mounier; France
1976 Montreal	Hector Rodríguez; Cuba	Chang Eun-kyung; South Korea	Felice Mariani; Italy
1976 Montreal	Hector Rodríguez; Cuba	Chang Eun-kyung; South Korea	József Tuncsik; Hungary
1980 Moscow	Ezio Gamba; Italy	Neil Adams; Great Britain	Ravdangiin Davaadalai; Mongolia
1980 Moscow	Ezio Gamba; Italy	Neil Adams; Great Britain	Karl-Heinz Lehmann; East Germany
1984 Los Angeles	Ahn Byeong-keun; South Korea	Ezio Gamba; Italy	Kerrith Brown; Great Britain
1984 Los Angeles	Ahn Byeong-keun; South Korea	Ezio Gamba; Italy	Luiz Onmura; Brazil
1988 Seoul	Marc Alexandre; France	Sven Loll; East Germany	Mike Swain; United States
1988 Seoul	Marc Alexandre; France	Sven Loll; East Germany	Georgy Tenadze; Soviet Union
1992 Barcelona	Toshihiko Koga; Japan	Bertalan Hajtós; Hungary	Hoon Chung; South Korea
1992 Barcelona	Toshihiko Koga; Japan	Bertalan Hajtós; Hungary	Oren Smadja; Israel
1996 Atlanta	Kenzo Nakamura; Japan	Kwak Dae-sung; South Korea	Christophe Gagliano; France
1996 Atlanta	Kenzo Nakamura; Japan	Kwak Dae-sung; South Korea	Jimmy Pedro; United States
2000 Sydney	Giuseppe Maddaloni; Italy	Tiago Camilo; Brazil	Anatoly Laryukov; Belarus
2000 Sydney	Giuseppe Maddaloni; Italy	Tiago Camilo; Brazil	Vsevolods Zeļonijs; Latvia
2004 Athens	Lee Won-hee; South Korea	Vitaliy Makarov; Russia	Leandro Guilheiro; Brazil
2004 Athens	Lee Won-hee; South Korea	Vitaliy Makarov; Russia	Jimmy Pedro; United States
2008 Beijing	Elnur Mammadli; Azerbaijan	Wang Ki-chun; South Korea	Rasul Boqiev; Tajikistan
2008 Beijing	Elnur Mammadli; Azerbaijan	Wang Ki-chun; South Korea	Leandro Guilheiro; Brazil
2012 London	Mansur Isaev; Russia	Riki Nakaya; Japan	Nyam-Ochir Sainjargal; Mongolia
2012 London	Mansur Isaev; Russia	Riki Nakaya; Japan	Ugo Legrand; France
2016 Rio de Janeiro	Shohei Ono; Japan	Rustam Orujov; Azerbaijan	Lasha Shavdatuashvili; Georgia
2016 Rio de Janeiro	Shohei Ono; Japan	Rustam Orujov; Azerbaijan	Dirk Van Tichelt; Belgium
2020 Tokyo	Shohei Ono; Japan	Lasha Shavdatuashvili; Georgia	An Chang-rim; South Korea
2020 Tokyo	Shohei Ono; Japan	Lasha Shavdatuashvili; Georgia	Tsend-Ochiryn Tsogtbaatar; Mongolia
2024 Paris	Hidayat Heydarov; Azerbaijan	Joan-Benjamin Gaba; France	Adil Osmanov; Moldova
2024 Paris	Hidayat Heydarov; Azerbaijan	Joan-Benjamin Gaba; France	Soichi Hashimoto; Japan
2028 Los Angeles			

=== Half middleweight ===
- 70 kg (1972–1976)
- 78 kg (1980–1996)
- 81 kg (2000–)

Games	Gold	Silver	Bronze
1972 Munich	Toyokazu Nomura; Japan	Antoni Zajkowski; Poland	Dietmar Hotger; East Germany
1972 Munich	Toyokazu Nomura; Japan	Antoni Zajkowski; Poland	Anatoliy Novikov; Soviet Union
1976 Montreal	Vladimir Nevzorov; Soviet Union	Koji Kuramoto; Japan	Marian Tałaj; Poland
1976 Montreal	Vladimir Nevzorov; Soviet Union	Koji Kuramoto; Japan	Patrick Vial; France
1980 Moscow	Shota Khabareli; Soviet Union	Juan Ferrer; Cuba	Harald Heinke; East Germany
1980 Moscow	Shota Khabareli; Soviet Union	Juan Ferrer; Cuba	Bernard Tchoullouyan; France
1984 Los Angeles	Frank Wieneke; West Germany	Neil Adams; Great Britain	Mircea Frăţică; Romania
1984 Los Angeles	Frank Wieneke; West Germany	Neil Adams; Great Britain	Michel Nowak; France
1988 Seoul	Waldemar Legień; Poland	Frank Wieneke; West Germany	Torsten Bréchôt; East Germany
1988 Seoul	Waldemar Legień; Poland	Frank Wieneke; West Germany	Bashir Varaev; Soviet Union
1992 Barcelona	Hidehiko Yoshida; Japan	Jason Morris; United States	Kim Byung-joo; South Korea
1992 Barcelona	Hidehiko Yoshida; Japan	Jason Morris; United States	Bertrand Damaisin; France
1996 Atlanta	Djamel Bouras; France	Toshihiko Koga; Japan	Cho In-chul; South Korea
1996 Atlanta	Djamel Bouras; France	Toshihiko Koga; Japan	Soso Liparteliani; Georgia
2000 Sydney	Makoto Takimoto; Japan	Cho In-chul; South Korea	Aleksei Budõlin; Estonia
2000 Sydney	Makoto Takimoto; Japan	Cho In-chul; South Korea	Nuno Delgado; Portugal
2004 Athens	Ilias Iliadis; Greece	Roman Gontiuk; Ukraine	Flávio Canto; Brazil
2004 Athens	Ilias Iliadis; Greece	Roman Gontiuk; Ukraine	Dmitri Nossov; Russia
2008 Beijing	Ole Bischof; Germany	Kim Jae-bum; South Korea	Tiago Camilo; Brazil
2008 Beijing	Ole Bischof; Germany	Kim Jae-bum; South Korea	Roman Gontiuk; Ukraine
2012 London	Kim Jae-bum; South Korea	Ole Bischof; Germany	Ivan Nifontov; Russia
2012 London	Kim Jae-bum; South Korea	Ole Bischof; Germany	Antoine Valois-Fortier; Canada
2016 Rio de Janeiro	Khasan Khalmurzaev; Russia	Travis Stevens; United States	Sergiu Toma; United Arab Emirates
2016 Rio de Janeiro	Khasan Khalmurzaev; Russia	Travis Stevens; United States	Takanori Nagase; Japan
2020 Tokyo	Takanori Nagase; Japan	Saeid Mollaei; Mongolia	Shamil Borchashvili; Austria
2020 Tokyo	Takanori Nagase; Japan	Saeid Mollaei; Mongolia	Matthias Casse; Belgium
2024 Paris	Takanori Nagase; Japan	Tato Grigalashvili; Georgia	Lee Joon-hwan; South Korea
2024 Paris	Takanori Nagase; Japan	Tato Grigalashvili; Georgia	Somon Makhmadbekov; Tajikistan
2028 Los Angeles			

=== Middleweight ===
- 80 kg (1964–1976)
- 86 kg (1980–1996)
- 90 kg (2000–)

Games	Gold	Silver	Bronze
1964 Tokyo	Isao Okano; Japan	Wolfgang Hofmann; United Team of Germany	James Bregman; United States
1964 Tokyo	Isao Okano; Japan	Wolfgang Hofmann; United Team of Germany	Kim Eui-tae; South Korea
1968 Mexico City	not included in the Olympic program		
1972 Munich	Shinobu Sekine; Japan	Oh Seung-lip; South Korea	Jean-Paul Coche; France
1972 Munich	Shinobu Sekine; Japan	Oh Seung-lip; South Korea	Brian Jacks; Great Britain
1976 Montreal	Isamu Sonoda; Japan	Valeriy Dvoynikov; Soviet Union	Slavko Obadov; Yugoslavia
1976 Montreal	Isamu Sonoda; Japan	Valeriy Dvoynikov; Soviet Union	Park Young-chul; South Korea
1980 Moscow	Jürg Röthlisberger; Switzerland	Isaac Azcuy; Cuba	Aleksandrs Jackevičs; Soviet Union
1980 Moscow	Jürg Röthlisberger; Switzerland	Isaac Azcuy; Cuba	Detlef Ultsch; East Germany
1984 Los Angeles	Peter Seisenbacher; Austria	Robert Berland; United States	Walter Carmona; Brazil
1984 Los Angeles	Peter Seisenbacher; Austria	Robert Berland; United States	Seiki Nose; Japan
1988 Seoul	Peter Seisenbacher; Austria	Vladimir Shestakov; Soviet Union	Akinobu Osako; Japan
1988 Seoul	Peter Seisenbacher; Austria	Vladimir Shestakov; Soviet Union	Ben Spijkers; Netherlands
1992 Barcelona	Waldemar Legień; Poland	Pascal Tayot; France	Nicolas Gill; Canada
1992 Barcelona	Waldemar Legień; Poland	Pascal Tayot; France	Hirotaka Okada; Japan
1996 Atlanta	Jeon Ki-young; South Korea	Armen Bagdasarov; Uzbekistan	Mark Huizinga; Netherlands
1996 Atlanta	Jeon Ki-young; South Korea	Armen Bagdasarov; Uzbekistan	Marko Spittka; Germany
2000 Sydney	Mark Huizinga; Netherlands	Carlos Honorato; Brazil	Frédéric Demontfaucon; France
2000 Sydney	Mark Huizinga; Netherlands	Carlos Honorato; Brazil	Ruslan Mashurenko; Ukraine
2004 Athens	Zurab Zviadauri; Georgia	Hiroshi Izumi; Japan	Mark Huizinga; Netherlands
2004 Athens	Zurab Zviadauri; Georgia	Hiroshi Izumi; Japan	Khasanbi Taov; Russia
2008 Beijing	Irakli Tsirekidze; Georgia	Amar Benikhlef; Algeria	Hesham Mesbah; Egypt
2008 Beijing	Irakli Tsirekidze; Georgia	Amar Benikhlef; Algeria	Sergei Aschwanden; Switzerland
2012 London	Song Dae-nam; South Korea	Asley González; Cuba	Ilias Iliadis; Greece
2012 London	Song Dae-nam; South Korea	Asley González; Cuba	Masashi Nishiyama; Japan
2016 Rio de Janeiro	Mashu Baker; Japan	Varlam Liparteliani; Georgia	Gwak Dong-han; South Korea
2016 Rio de Janeiro	Mashu Baker; Japan	Varlam Liparteliani; Georgia	Cheng Xunzhao; China
2020 Tokyo	Lasha Bekauri; Georgia	Eduard Trippel; Germany	Davlat Bobonov; Uzbekistan
2020 Tokyo	Lasha Bekauri; Georgia	Eduard Trippel; Germany	Krisztián Tóth; Hungary
2024 Paris	Lasha Bekauri; Georgia	Sanshiro Murao; Japan	Maxime-Gaël Ngayap Hambou; France
2024 Paris	Lasha Bekauri; Georgia	Sanshiro Murao; Japan	Theodoros Tselidis; Greece
2028 Los Angeles			

=== Half heavyweight ===
- 93 kg (1972–1976)
- 95 kg (1980–1996)
- 100 kg (2000–)

Games	Gold	Silver	Bronze
1972 Munich	Shota Chochishvili; Soviet Union	David Starbrook; Great Britain	Paul Barth; West Germany
1972 Munich	Shota Chochishvili; Soviet Union	David Starbrook; Great Britain	Chiaki Ishii; Brazil
1976 Montreal	Kazuhiro Ninomiya; Japan	Ramaz Kharshiladze; Soviet Union	Jürg Röthlisberger; Switzerland
1976 Montreal	Kazuhiro Ninomiya; Japan	Ramaz Kharshiladze; Soviet Union	David Starbrook; Great Britain
1980 Moscow	Robert Van de Walle; Belgium	Tengiz Khubuluri; Soviet Union	Dietmar Lorenz; East Germany
1980 Moscow	Robert Van de Walle; Belgium	Tengiz Khubuluri; Soviet Union	Henk Numan; Netherlands
1984 Los Angeles	Ha Hyung-joo; South Korea	Douglas Vieira; Brazil	Bjarni Friðriksson; Iceland
1984 Los Angeles	Ha Hyung-joo; South Korea	Douglas Vieira; Brazil	Günther Neureuther; West Germany
1988 Seoul	Aurélio Miguel; Brazil	Marc Meiling; West Germany	Dennis Stewart; Great Britain
1988 Seoul	Aurélio Miguel; Brazil	Marc Meiling; West Germany	Robert Van De Walle; Belgium
1992 Barcelona	Antal Kovács; Hungary	Raymond Stevens; Great Britain	Theo Meijer; Netherlands
1992 Barcelona	Antal Kovács; Hungary	Raymond Stevens; Great Britain	Dmitri Sergeyev; Unified Team
1996 Atlanta	Paweł Nastula; Poland	Kim Min-soo; South Korea	Aurélio Miguel; Brazil
1996 Atlanta	Paweł Nastula; Poland	Kim Min-soo; South Korea	Stéphane Traineau; France
2000 Sydney	Kōsei Inoue; Japan	Nicolas Gill; Canada	Youri Stepkine; Russia
2000 Sydney	Kōsei Inoue; Japan	Nicolas Gill; Canada	Stéphane Traineau; France
2004 Athens	Ihar Makarau; Belarus	Jang Sung-ho; South Korea	Michael Jurack; Germany
2004 Athens	Ihar Makarau; Belarus	Jang Sung-ho; South Korea	Ariel Ze'evi; Israel
2008 Beijing	Naidangiin Tüvshinbayar; Mongolia	Askhat Zhitkeyev; Kazakhstan	Movlud Miraliyev; Azerbaijan
2008 Beijing	Naidangiin Tüvshinbayar; Mongolia	Askhat Zhitkeyev; Kazakhstan	Henk Grol; Netherlands
2012 London	Tagir Khaybulaev; Russia	Naidangiin Tüvshinbayar; Mongolia	Dimitri Peters; Germany
2012 London	Tagir Khaybulaev; Russia	Naidangiin Tüvshinbayar; Mongolia	Henk Grol; Netherlands
2016 Rio de Janeiro	Lukáš Krpálek; Czech Republic	Elmar Gasimov; Azerbaijan	Cyrille Maret; France
2016 Rio de Janeiro	Lukáš Krpálek; Czech Republic	Elmar Gasimov; Azerbaijan	Ryunosuke Haga; Japan
2020 Tokyo	Aaron Wolf; Japan	Cho Gu-ham; South Korea	Jorge Fonseca; Portugal
2020 Tokyo	Aaron Wolf; Japan	Cho Gu-ham; South Korea	Niyaz Ilyasov; ROC
2024 Paris	Zelym Kotsoiev; Azerbaijan	Ilia Sulamanidze; Georgia	Peter Paltchik; Israel
2024 Paris	Zelym Kotsoiev; Azerbaijan	Ilia Sulamanidze; Georgia	Muzaffarbek Turoboyev; Uzbekistan
2028 Los Angeles			

=== Heavyweight ===
- over 80 kg (1964)
- over 93 kg (1972–1976)
- over 95 kg (1980–1996)
- over 100 kg (2000–)

Games	Gold	Silver	Bronze
1964 Tokyo	Isao Inokuma; Japan	Doug Rogers; Canada	Parnaoz Chikviladze; Soviet Union
1964 Tokyo	Isao Inokuma; Japan	Doug Rogers; Canada	Anzor Kiknadze; Soviet Union
1968 Mexico City	not included in the Olympic program		
1972 Munich	Wim Ruska; Netherlands	Klaus Glahn; West Germany	Motoki Nishimura; Japan
1972 Munich	Wim Ruska; Netherlands	Klaus Glahn; West Germany	Givi Onashvili; Soviet Union
1976 Montreal	Serhiy Novikov; Soviet Union	Günther Neureuther; West Germany	Allen Coage; United States
1976 Montreal	Serhiy Novikov; Soviet Union	Günther Neureuther; West Germany	Sumio Endo; Japan
1980 Moscow	Angelo Parisi; France	Dimitar Zaprianov; Bulgaria	Radomir Kovačević; Yugoslavia
1980 Moscow	Angelo Parisi; France	Dimitar Zaprianov; Bulgaria	Vladimír Kocman; Czechoslovakia
1984 Los Angeles	Hitoshi Saito; Japan	Angelo Parisi; France	Mark Berger; Canada
1984 Los Angeles	Hitoshi Saito; Japan	Angelo Parisi; France	Cho Yong-chul; South Korea
1988 Seoul	Hitoshi Saito; Japan	Henry Stöhr; East Germany	Cho Yong-chul; South Korea
1988 Seoul	Hitoshi Saito; Japan	Henry Stöhr; East Germany	Grigory Verichev; Soviet Union
1992 Barcelona	David Khakhaleishvili; Unified Team	Naoya Ogawa; Japan	Imre Csösz; Hungary
1992 Barcelona	David Khakhaleishvili; Unified Team	Naoya Ogawa; Japan	David Douillet; France
1996 Atlanta	David Douillet; France	Ernesto Pérez; Spain	Frank Möller; Germany
1996 Atlanta	David Douillet; France	Ernesto Pérez; Spain	Harry van Barneveld; Belgium
2000 Sydney	David Douillet; France	Shinichi Shinohara; Japan	Indrek Pertelson; Estonia
2000 Sydney	David Douillet; France	Shinichi Shinohara; Japan	Tamerlan Tmenov; Russia
2004 Athens	Keiji Suzuki; Japan	Tamerlan Tmenov; Russia	Dennis van der Geest; Netherlands
2004 Athens	Keiji Suzuki; Japan	Tamerlan Tmenov; Russia	Indrek Pertelson; Estonia
2008 Beijing	Satoshi Ishii; Japan	Abdullo Tangriev; Uzbekistan	Oscar Braison; Cuba
2008 Beijing	Satoshi Ishii; Japan	Abdullo Tangriev; Uzbekistan	Teddy Riner; France
2012 London	Teddy Riner; France	Aleksandr Mikhailine; Russia	Rafael Silva; Brazil
2012 London	Teddy Riner; France	Aleksandr Mikhailine; Russia	Andreas Tölzer; Germany
2016 Rio de Janeiro	Teddy Riner; France	Hisayoshi Harasawa; Japan	Rafael Silva; Brazil
2016 Rio de Janeiro	Teddy Riner; France	Hisayoshi Harasawa; Japan	Or Sasson; Israel
2020 Tokyo	Lukáš Krpálek; Czech Republic	Guram Tushishvili; Georgia	Teddy Riner; France
2020 Tokyo	Lukáš Krpálek; Czech Republic	Guram Tushishvili; Georgia	Tamerlan Bashaev; ROC
2024 Paris	Teddy Riner; France	Kim Min-jong; South Korea	Temur Rakhimov; Tajikistan
2024 Paris	Teddy Riner; France	Kim Min-jong; South Korea	Alisher Yusupov; Uzbekistan
2028 Los Angeles			

== Women ==
=== Extra lightweight ===
- 48 kg

Games	Gold	Silver	Bronze
1992 Barcelona	Cécile Nowak; France	Ryoko Tamura; Japan	Amarilis Savón; Cuba
1992 Barcelona	Cécile Nowak; France	Ryoko Tamura; Japan	Hülya Şenyurt; Turkey
1996 Atlanta	Kye Sun-hui; North Korea	Ryoko Tamura; Japan	Amarilis Savón; Cuba
1996 Atlanta	Kye Sun-hui; North Korea	Ryoko Tamura; Japan	Yolanda Soler; Spain
2000 Sydney	Ryoko Tamura; Japan	Lyubov Bruletova; Russia	Anna-Maria Gradante; Germany
2000 Sydney	Ryoko Tamura; Japan	Lyubov Bruletova; Russia	Ann Simons; Belgium
2004 Athens	Ryoko Tani; Japan	Frédérique Jossinet; France	Julia Matijass; Germany
2004 Athens	Ryoko Tani; Japan	Frédérique Jossinet; France	Gao Feng; China
2008 Beijing	Alina Dumitru; Romania	Yanet Bermoy; Cuba	Paula Pareto; Argentina
2008 Beijing	Alina Dumitru; Romania	Yanet Bermoy; Cuba	Ryoko Tani; Japan
2012 London	Sarah Menezes; Brazil	Alina Dumitru; Romania	Éva Csernoviczki; Hungary
2012 London	Sarah Menezes; Brazil	Alina Dumitru; Romania	Charline Van Snick; Belgium
2016 Rio de Janeiro	Paula Pareto; Argentina	Jeong Bo-kyeong; South Korea	Ami Kondo; Japan
2016 Rio de Janeiro	Paula Pareto; Argentina	Jeong Bo-kyeong; South Korea	Galbadrakhyn Otgontsetseg; Kazakhstan
2020 Tokyo	Distria Krasniqi; Kosovo	Funa Tonaki; Japan	Daria Bilodid; Ukraine
2020 Tokyo	Distria Krasniqi; Kosovo	Funa Tonaki; Japan	Urantsetseg Munkhbat; Mongolia
2024 Paris	Natsumi Tsunoda; Japan	Bavuudorjiin Baasankhüü; Mongolia	Shirine Boukli; France
2024 Paris	Natsumi Tsunoda; Japan	Bavuudorjiin Baasankhüü; Mongolia	Tara Babulfath; Sweden
2028 Los Angeles			

=== Half lightweight ===
- 52 kg

Games	Gold	Silver	Bronze
1992 Barcelona	Almudena Muñoz; Spain	Noriko Mizoguchi; Japan	Li Zhongyun; China
1992 Barcelona	Almudena Muñoz; Spain	Noriko Mizoguchi; Japan	Sharon Rendle; Great Britain
1996 Atlanta	Marie-Claire Restoux; France	Hyun Sook-hee; South Korea	Noriko Sugawara; Japan
1996 Atlanta	Marie-Claire Restoux; France	Hyun Sook-hee; South Korea	Legna Verdecia; Cuba
2000 Sydney	Legna Verdecia; Cuba	Noriko Narazaki; Japan	Liu Yuxiang; China
2000 Sydney	Legna Verdecia; Cuba	Noriko Narazaki; Japan	Kye Sun-hui; North Korea
2004 Athens	Xian Dongmei; China	Yuki Yokosawa; Japan	Amarilis Savón; Cuba
2004 Athens	Xian Dongmei; China	Yuki Yokosawa; Japan	Ilse Heylen; Belgium
2008 Beijing	Xian Dongmei; China	An Kum-ae; North Korea	Soraya Haddad; Algeria
2008 Beijing	Xian Dongmei; China	An Kum-ae; North Korea	Misato Nakamura; Japan
2012 London	An Kum-ae; North Korea	Yanet Bermoy; Cuba	Rosalba Forciniti; Italy
2012 London	An Kum-ae; North Korea	Yanet Bermoy; Cuba	Priscilla Gneto; France
2016 Rio de Janeiro	Majlinda Kelmendi; Kosovo	Odette Giuffrida; Italy	Misato Nakamura; Japan
2016 Rio de Janeiro	Majlinda Kelmendi; Kosovo	Odette Giuffrida; Italy	Natalia Kuziutina; Russia
2020 Tokyo	Uta Abe; Japan	Amandine Buchard; France	Odette Giuffrida; Italy
2020 Tokyo	Uta Abe; Japan	Amandine Buchard; France	Chelsie Giles; Great Britain
2024 Paris	Diyora Keldiyorova; Uzbekistan	Distria Krasniqi; Kosovo	Larissa Pimenta; Brazil
2024 Paris	Diyora Keldiyorova; Uzbekistan	Distria Krasniqi; Kosovo	Amandine Buchard; France
2028 Los Angeles			

=== Lightweight ===
- 56 kg (1992–1996)
- 57 kg (2000–)

Games	Gold	Silver	Bronze
1992 Barcelona	Miriam Blasco Soto; Spain	Nicola Fairbrother; Great Britain	Driulis González; Cuba
1992 Barcelona	Miriam Blasco Soto; Spain	Nicola Fairbrother; Great Britain	Chiyori Tateno; Japan
1996 Atlanta	Driulis González; Cuba	Jung Sun-yong; South Korea	Isabel Fernández; Spain
1996 Atlanta	Driulis González; Cuba	Jung Sun-yong; South Korea	Marisabel Lomba; Belgium
2000 Sydney	Isabel Fernández; Spain	Driulis González; Cuba	Kie Kusakabe; Japan
2000 Sydney	Isabel Fernández; Spain	Driulis González; Cuba	Maria Pekli; Australia
2004 Athens	Yvonne Bönisch; Germany	Kye Sun-hui; North Korea	Deborah Gravenstijn; Netherlands
2004 Athens	Yvonne Bönisch; Germany	Kye Sun-hui; North Korea	Yurisleidy Lupetey; Cuba
2008 Beijing	Giulia Quintavalle; Italy	Deborah Gravenstijn; Netherlands	Ketleyn Quadros; Brazil
2008 Beijing	Giulia Quintavalle; Italy	Deborah Gravenstijn; Netherlands	Xu Yan; China
2012 London	Kaori Matsumoto; Japan	Corina Căprioriu; Romania	Marti Malloy; United States
2012 London	Kaori Matsumoto; Japan	Corina Căprioriu; Romania	Automne Pavia; France
2016 Rio de Janeiro	Rafaela Silva; Brazil	Dorjsürengiin Sumiyaa; Mongolia	Kaori Matsumoto; Japan
2016 Rio de Janeiro	Rafaela Silva; Brazil	Dorjsürengiin Sumiyaa; Mongolia	Telma Monteiro; Portugal
2020 Tokyo	Nora Gjakova; Kosovo	Sarah-Léonie Cysique; France	Jessica Klimkait; Canada
2020 Tokyo	Nora Gjakova; Kosovo	Sarah-Léonie Cysique; France	Tsukasa Yoshida; Japan
2024 Paris	Christa Deguchi; Canada	Huh Mi-mi; South Korea	Haruka Funakubo; Japan
2024 Paris	Christa Deguchi; Canada	Huh Mi-mi; South Korea	Sarah-Léonie Cysique; France
2028 Los Angeles			

=== Half middleweight ===
- 61 kg (1992–1996)
- 63 kg (2000–)

Games	Gold	Silver	Bronze
1992 Barcelona	Catherine Fleury; France	Yael Arad; Israel	Yelena Petrova; Unified Team
1992 Barcelona	Catherine Fleury; France	Yael Arad; Israel	Zhang Di; China
1996 Atlanta	Yuko Emoto; Japan	Gella Vandecaveye; Belgium	Jenny Gal; Netherlands
1996 Atlanta	Yuko Emoto; Japan	Gella Vandecaveye; Belgium	Jung Sung-sook; South Korea
2000 Sydney	Séverine Vandenhende; France	Li Shufang; China	Jung Sung-sook; South Korea
2000 Sydney	Séverine Vandenhende; France	Li Shufang; China	Gella Vandecaveye; Belgium
2004 Athens	Ayumi Tanimoto; Japan	Claudia Heill; Austria	Urška Žolnir; Slovenia
2004 Athens	Ayumi Tanimoto; Japan	Claudia Heill; Austria	Driulis González; Cuba
2008 Beijing	Ayumi Tanimoto; Japan	Lucie Décosse; France	Elisabeth Willeboordse; Netherlands
2008 Beijing	Ayumi Tanimoto; Japan	Lucie Décosse; France	Won Ok-im; North Korea
2012 London	Urška Žolnir; Slovenia	Xu Lili; China	Yoshie Ueno; Japan
2012 London	Urška Žolnir; Slovenia	Xu Lili; China	Gévrise Émane; France
2016 Rio de Janeiro	Tina Trstenjak; Slovenia	Clarisse Agbegnenou; France	Yarden Gerbi; Israel
2016 Rio de Janeiro	Tina Trstenjak; Slovenia	Clarisse Agbegnenou; France	Anicka van Emden; Netherlands
2020 Tokyo	Clarisse Agbegnenou; France	Tina Trstenjak; Slovenia	Maria Centracchio; Italy
2020 Tokyo	Clarisse Agbegnenou; France	Tina Trstenjak; Slovenia	Catherine Beauchemin-Pinard; Canada
2024 Paris	Andreja Leški; Slovenia	Prisca Awiti Alcaraz; Mexico	Clarisse Agbegnenou; France
2024 Paris	Andreja Leški; Slovenia	Prisca Awiti Alcaraz; Mexico	Laura Fazliu; Kosovo
2028 Los Angeles			

=== Middleweight ===
- 66 kg (1992–1996)
- 70 kg (2000–)

Games	Gold	Silver	Bronze
1992 Barcelona	Odalis Revé; Cuba	Emanuela Pierantozzi; Italy	Kate Howey; Great Britain
1992 Barcelona	Odalis Revé; Cuba	Emanuela Pierantozzi; Italy	Heidi Rakels; Belgium
1996 Atlanta	Cho Min-sun; South Korea	Aneta Szczepańska; Poland	Wang Xianbo; China
1996 Atlanta	Cho Min-sun; South Korea	Aneta Szczepańska; Poland	Claudia Zwiers; Netherlands
2000 Sydney	Sibelis Veranes; Cuba	Kate Howey; Great Britain	Cho Min-sun; South Korea
2000 Sydney	Sibelis Veranes; Cuba	Kate Howey; Great Britain	Ylenia Scapin; Italy
2004 Athens	Masae Ueno; Japan	Edith Bosch; Netherlands	Qin Dongya; China
2004 Athens	Masae Ueno; Japan	Edith Bosch; Netherlands	Annett Böhm; Germany
2008 Beijing	Masae Ueno; Japan	Anaysi Hernández; Cuba	Ronda Rousey; United States
2008 Beijing	Masae Ueno; Japan	Anaysi Hernández; Cuba	Edith Bosch; Netherlands
2012 London	Lucie Décosse; France	Kerstin Thiele; Germany	Yuri Alvear; Colombia
2012 London	Lucie Décosse; France	Kerstin Thiele; Germany	Edith Bosch; Netherlands
2016 Rio de Janeiro	Haruka Tachimoto; Japan	Yuri Alvear; Colombia	Sally Conway; Great Britain
2016 Rio de Janeiro	Haruka Tachimoto; Japan	Yuri Alvear; Colombia	Laura Vargas Koch; Germany
2020 Tokyo	Chizuru Arai; Japan	Michaela Polleres; Austria	Madina Taimazova; ROC
2020 Tokyo	Chizuru Arai; Japan	Michaela Polleres; Austria	Sanne van Dijke; Netherlands
2024 Paris	Barbara Matić; Croatia	Miriam Butkereit; Germany	Michaela Polleres; Austria
2024 Paris	Barbara Matić; Croatia	Miriam Butkereit; Germany	Gabriella Willems; Belgium
2028 Los Angeles			

=== Half heavyweight ===
- 72 kg (1992–1996)
- 78 kg (2000–)

Games	Gold	Silver	Bronze
1992 Barcelona	Kim Mi-jung; South Korea	Yoko Tanabe; Japan	Irene de Kok; Netherlands
1992 Barcelona	Kim Mi-jung; South Korea	Yoko Tanabe; Japan	Laetitia Meignan; France
1996 Atlanta	Ulla Werbrouck; Belgium	Yoko Tanabe; Japan	Diadenis Luna; Cuba
1996 Atlanta	Ulla Werbrouck; Belgium	Yoko Tanabe; Japan	Ylenia Scapin; Italy
2000 Sydney	Tang Lin; China	Céline Lebrun; France	Emanuela Pierantozzi; Italy
2000 Sydney	Tang Lin; China	Céline Lebrun; France	Simona Richter; Romania
2004 Athens	Noriko Anno; Japan	Liu Xia; China	Lucia Morico; Italy
2004 Athens	Noriko Anno; Japan	Liu Xia; China	Yurisel Laborde; Cuba
2008 Beijing	Yang Xiuli; China	Yalennis Castillo; Cuba	Jeong Gyeong-mi; South Korea
2008 Beijing	Yang Xiuli; China	Yalennis Castillo; Cuba	Stéphanie Possamaï; France
2012 London	Kayla Harrison; United States	Gemma Gibbons; Great Britain	Audrey Tcheuméo; France
2012 London	Kayla Harrison; United States	Gemma Gibbons; Great Britain	Mayra Aguiar; Brazil
2016 Rio de Janeiro	Kayla Harrison; United States	Audrey Tcheuméo; France	Mayra Aguiar; Brazil
2016 Rio de Janeiro	Kayla Harrison; United States	Audrey Tcheuméo; France	Anamari Velenšek; Slovenia
2020 Tokyo	Shori Hamada; Japan	Madeleine Malonga; France	Anna-Maria Wagner; Germany
2020 Tokyo	Shori Hamada; Japan	Madeleine Malonga; France	Mayra Aguiar; Brazil
2024 Paris	Alice Bellandi; Italy	Inbar Lanir; Israel	Ma Zhenzhao; China
2024 Paris	Alice Bellandi; Italy	Inbar Lanir; Israel	Patrícia Sampaio; Portugal
2028 Los Angeles			

=== Heavyweight ===
- over 72 kg (1992–1996)
- over 78 kg (2000–)

Games	Gold	Silver	Bronze
1992 Barcelona	Zhuang Xiaoyan; China	Estela Rodríguez; Cuba	Natalia Lupino; France
1992 Barcelona	Zhuang Xiaoyan; China	Estela Rodríguez; Cuba	Yoko Sakaue; Japan
1996 Atlanta	Sun Fuming; China	Estela Rodríguez; Cuba	Christine Cicot; France
1996 Atlanta	Sun Fuming; China	Estela Rodríguez; Cuba	Johanna Hagn; Germany
2000 Sydney	Yuan Hua; China	Daima Beltrán; Cuba	Kim Seon-Young; South Korea
2000 Sydney	Yuan Hua; China	Daima Beltrán; Cuba	Mayumi Yamashita; Japan
2004 Athens	Maki Tsukada; Japan	Daima Beltrán; Cuba	Tea Donguzashvili; Russia
2004 Athens	Maki Tsukada; Japan	Daima Beltrán; Cuba	Sun Fuming; China
2008 Beijing	Tong Wen; China	Maki Tsukada; Japan	Lucija Polavder; Slovenia
2008 Beijing	Tong Wen; China	Maki Tsukada; Japan	Idalys Ortiz; Cuba
2012 London	Idalys Ortiz; Cuba	Mika Sugimoto; Japan	Karina Bryant; Great Britain
2012 London	Idalys Ortiz; Cuba	Mika Sugimoto; Japan	Tong Wen; China
2016 Rio de Janeiro	Émilie Andéol; France	Idalys Ortiz; Cuba	Kanae Yamabe; Japan
2016 Rio de Janeiro	Émilie Andéol; France	Idalys Ortiz; Cuba	Yu Song; China
2020 Tokyo	Akira Sone; Japan	Idalys Ortiz; Cuba	Iryna Kindzerska; Azerbaijan
2020 Tokyo	Akira Sone; Japan	Idalys Ortiz; Cuba	Romane Dicko; France
2024 Paris	Beatriz Souza; Brazil	Raz Hershko; Israel	Kim Ha-yun; South Korea
2024 Paris	Beatriz Souza; Brazil	Raz Hershko; Israel	Romane Dicko; France
2028 Los Angeles			

== Mixed ==
=== Team ===
Games	Gold	Silver	Bronze
2020 Tokyo	France; Clarisse Agbegnenou; Axel Clerget; Romane Dicko; Teddy Riner; Sarah-Léonie Cysique; Guillaume Chaine; Amandine Buchard; Alexandre Iddir; Kilian Le Blouch; Madeleine Malonga; Margaux Pinot	Japan; Chizuru Arai; Shoichiro Mukai; Akira Sone; Aaron Wolf; Tsukasa Yoshida; Shohei Ono; Hifumi Abe; Uta Abe; Shori Hamada; Hisayoshi Harasawa; Takanori Nagase; Miku Tashiro	Germany; Giovanna Scoccimarro; Dominic Ressel; Anna-Maria Wagner; Karl-Richard Frey; Theresa Stoll; Sebastian Seidl; Jasmin Grabowski; Katharina Menz; Martyna Trajdos; Eduard Trippel; Igor Wandtke; Johannes Frey
2020 Tokyo	France; Clarisse Agbegnenou; Axel Clerget; Romane Dicko; Teddy Riner; Sarah-Léonie Cysique; Guillaume Chaine; Amandine Buchard; Alexandre Iddir; Kilian Le Blouch; Madeleine Malonga; Margaux Pinot	Japan; Chizuru Arai; Shoichiro Mukai; Akira Sone; Aaron Wolf; Tsukasa Yoshida; Shohei Ono; Hifumi Abe; Uta Abe; Shori Hamada; Hisayoshi Harasawa; Takanori Nagase; Miku Tashiro	Israel; Gili Sharir; Sagi Muki; Raz Hershko; Peter Paltchik; Timna Nelson-Levy; Tohar Butbul; Or Sasson; Li Kochman; Baruch Shmailov; Inbar Lanir; Shira Rishony
2024 Paris	France; Shirine Boukli; Joan-Benjamin Gaba; Amandine Buchard; Walide Khyar; Sarah-Léonie Cysique; Luka Mkheidze; Clarisse Agbegnenou; Alpha Oumar Djalo; Marie-Ève Gahié; Maxime-Gaël Ngayap Hambou; Romane Dicko; Aurelien Diesse; Madeleine Malonga; Teddy Riner	Japan; Uta Abe; Hifumi Abe; Haruka Funakubo; Soichi Hashimoto; Natsumi Tsunoda; Ryuju Nagayama; Saki Niizoe; Sanshiro Murao; Miku Takaichi; Takanori Nagase; Aaron Wolf; Rika Takayama; Akira Sone; Tatsuru Saito	Brazil; Daniel Cargnin; Leonardo Gonçalves; Willian Lima; Rafael Macedo; Guilherme Schimidt; Rafael Silva; Larissa Pimenta; Ketleyn Quadros; Rafaela Silva; Beatriz Souza
2024 Paris	France; Shirine Boukli; Joan-Benjamin Gaba; Amandine Buchard; Walide Khyar; Sarah-Léonie Cysique; Luka Mkheidze; Clarisse Agbegnenou; Alpha Oumar Djalo; Marie-Ève Gahié; Maxime-Gaël Ngayap Hambou; Romane Dicko; Aurelien Diesse; Madeleine Malonga; Teddy Riner	Japan; Uta Abe; Hifumi Abe; Haruka Funakubo; Soichi Hashimoto; Natsumi Tsunoda; Ryuju Nagayama; Saki Niizoe; Sanshiro Murao; Miku Takaichi; Takanori Nagase; Aaron Wolf; Rika Takayama; Akira Sone; Tatsuru Saito	South Korea; Lee Hye-kyeong; Kim Won-jin; Jung Ye-rin; An Ba-ul; Huh Mi-mi; Kim Ji-su; Lee Joon-hwan; Han Ju-yeop; Yoon Hyun-ji; Kim Ha-yun; Kim Min-jong
2028 Los Angeles			

== Discontinued event ==
=== Open class ===
Games	Gold	Silver	Bronze
1964 Tokyo	Anton Geesink; Netherlands	Akio Kaminaga; Japan	Theodore Boronovskis; Australia
1964 Tokyo	Anton Geesink; Netherlands	Akio Kaminaga; Japan	Klaus Glahn; United Team of Germany
1968 Mexico City	not included in the Olympic program		
1972 Munich	Wim Ruska; Netherlands	Vitali Kuznetsov; Soviet Union	Jean-Claude Brondani; France
1972 Munich	Wim Ruska; Netherlands	Vitali Kuznetsov; Soviet Union	Angelo Parisi; Great Britain
1976 Montreal	Haruki Uemura; Japan	Keith Remfry; Great Britain	Cho Jea-Ki; South Korea
1976 Montreal	Haruki Uemura; Japan	Keith Remfry; Great Britain	Shota Chochishvili; Soviet Union
1980 Moscow	Dietmar Lorenz; East Germany	Angelo Parisi; France	András Ozsvár; Hungary
1980 Moscow	Dietmar Lorenz; East Germany	Angelo Parisi; France	Arthur Mapp; Great Britain
1984 Los Angeles	Yasuhiro Yamashita; Japan	Mohamed Rashwan; Egypt	Arthur Schnabel; West Germany
1984 Los Angeles	Yasuhiro Yamashita; Japan	Mohamed Rashwan; Egypt	Mihai Cioc; Romania

== Multiple medalists ==
This is a list of multiple Olympic judo medalists, listing people who have won two or more Olympic gold medals or more than four medals.

Updated to Paris 2024.

No.	Athlete	Nation	Sex	1st place, gold medalist(s)	2nd place, silver medalist(s)	3rd place, bronze medalist(s)	Total
1	Teddy Riner	France	M	5	0	2	7
2	Clarisse Agbegnenou	France	F	3	1	1	5
3	Tadahiro Nomura	Japan	M	3	0	0	3
4	Takanori Nagase	Japan	M	2	2	1	5
4	Ryoko Tani	Japan	F	2	2	1	5
6	Hifumi Abe	Japan	M	2	2	0	4
7	Amandine Buchard	France	F	2	1	1	4
7	Sarah-Léonie Cysique	France	F	2	1	1	4
9	Madeleine Malonga	France	F	2	1	0	3
10	Shohei Ono	Japan	M	2	1	0	3
11	Romane Dicko	France	F	2	0	2	4
12	David Douillet	France	M	2	0	1	3
13	Lasha Bekauri	Georgia	M	2	0	0	2
13	Xian Dongmei	China	F	2	0	0	2
13	Kayla Harrison	United States	F	2	0	0	2
13	Lukáš Krpálek	Czech Republic	M	2	0	0	2
13	Waldemar Legień	Poland	M	2	0	0	2
13	Hitoshi Saito	Japan	M	2	0	0	2
13	Peter Seisenbacher	Austria	M	2	0	0	2
13	Ayumi Tanimoto	Japan	F	2	0	0	2
13	Masato Uchishiba	Japan	M	2	0	0	2
13	Masae Ueno	Japan	F	2	0	0	2
23	Idalys Ortiz	Cuba	F	1	2	1	4
24	Driulis González	Cuba	F	1	1	2	4

== See also ==
- List of World Judo Championships medalists
- List of European Judo Championships medalists
