= Judo at the 1980 Summer Olympics – Men's 86 kg =

Judo competition

Men's 86kg at the Games of the XXII Olympiad
- Venue: Palace of Sports of the Central Lenin Stadium
- Date: 28 July 1980
- Competitors: 27 from 27 nations

Medalists
| 1st place, gold medalist(s) | | Jürg Röthlisberger | Switzerland |
| 2nd place, silver medalist(s) | | Isaac Azcuy | Cuba |
| 3rd place, bronze medalist(s) | | Aleksandr Yatskevich | Soviet Union |
| 3rd place, bronze medalist(s) | | Detlef Ultsch | East Germany |

Men's 86 kg competition in Judo at the 1980 Summer Olympics in Moscow, Soviet Union was held at Palace of Sports of the Central Lenin Stadium. The gold medal was won by Jürg Röthlisberger from Switzerland.

== Results ==
=== Pool A ===
Round of 32
Aleksandr Yatskevich (URS) | 5:00
Dambajavyn Tsend–Ayuush (MGL) | E
Krzysztof Kurczyna (POL) | 5:00
Mark Carew (AUS) | E
José Antonio Cecchini (ESP) | 5:00
Michel Sanchis (FRA) | E
Slavko Obadov (YUG)
Bye
Henri-Richard Lobe (CMR) | 0:00
Jean Nicolas (BEL) | wo
Jürg Röthlisberger (SUI) | 5:00
Bertil Ström (SWE) | R
Milton Estrella (ECU) | 0:00
Kolyo Boyadzhiev (BUL) | wo
Kostas Papakostas (CYP)
Bye

Round of 16
Aleksandr Yatskevich (URS) | 5:00
Krzysztof Kurczyna (POL) | E
Slavko Obadov (YUG) | 5:00
José Antonio Cecchini (ESP) | E
Jürg Röthlisberger (SUI) | 2:37
Henri-Richard Lobe (CMR) | R
Kostas Papakostas (CYP) | 5:00
Milton Estrella (ECU)

Quarterfinal
Aleksandr Yatskevich (URS) | 1:32
Slavko Obadov (YUG) | E
Jürg Röthlisberger (SUI) | 0:00
Kostas Papakostas (CYP) | wo

Semifinal
Jürg Röthlisberger (SUI) | 5:00
Aleksandr Yatskevich (URS) | R

=== Pool B ===
Round of 32
Walter Carmona (BRA) | 1:58
Endre Kiss (HUN) | E
Akilong Diabone (SEN) | 3:17
Mahmoud Saad (SYR) | E
Pak Jong-chol (PRK) | 5:00
Peter Seisenbacher (AUT) | E
Mihalache Toma (ROM)
Bye
Isaac Azcuy (CUB) | 2:02
Peter Donnelly (GBR) | R
Donald Mukahatesho (ZAM)
Bye
Detlef Ultsch (GDR) | 2:10
Ibrahim Muzaffer (KUW) | E
Franch Casadei (SMR)
Bye

Round of 16
Walter Carmona (BRA) | 3:02
Akilong Diabone (SEN) | E
Mihalache Toma (ROM) | 5:00
Pak Jong-chol (PRK) | E
Isaac Azcuy (CUB) | 0:55
Donald Muhakatesho (ZAM) | R
Detlef Ultsch (GDR) | 0:50
Franch Casadei (SMR) | E

Quarterfinal
Walter Carmona (BRA) | 0:53
Mihalache Toma (ROM) | E
Isaac Azcuy (CUB) | 5:00
Detlef Ultsch (GDR) | R

Semifinal
Isaac Azcuy (CUB) | 1:27
Walter Carmona (BRA) | R

=== Repechages ===
| Repechage | | Repechage semifinal | | Repechage final |
| Bertil Ström (SWE) | 5:00 |
| Henri-Richard Lobe (CMR) | E | Bertil Ström (SWE) | 0:00 |
| | | Kostas Papakostas (CYP) |
| | | | | Aleksandr Yatskevich (URS) | 4:24 (bronze) |
| | | | | Bertil Ström (SWE) |

| Repechage | | Repechage semifinal | | Repechage final |
| Peter Donnelly (GBR) | 0:16 |
| Donald Muhakatesho (ZAM) | E | Detlef Ultsch (GDR) | 5:00 |
| | | Peter Donnelly (GBR) | E |
| | | | | Detlef Ultsch (GDR) | 7:00 (bronze) |
| | | | | Walter Carmona (BRA) |

=== Final ===
| Final |
| Jürg Röthlisberger (SUI) | 7:00 (gold) |
| Isaac Azcuy (CUB) | 2nd place, silver medalist(s) |
