= 1979 European Judo Championships =

1979 Judo European Judo Championships
- Location: Brussels, Belgium
- Dates: 24–27 May 1979

Competition at external databases
- Links: JudoInside

The 1979 European Judo Championships were the 29th edition of the European Judo Championships, and were held in Brussels, Belgium from 24 to 27 May 1979.

== Medal overview ==
| Event | Gold | Silver | Bronze |
|---|---|---|---|
| 60 kg | (Italy) Felice Mariani | (Germany) Helmut Grobelin | (Austria) Josef Reiter (Soviet Union) Aramby Emizh |
| 65 kg | (Soviet Union) Nikolay Solodukhin | (Germany) James Rohleder | (France) Yves Delvingt (Romania) Nicolae Vlad |
| 71 kg | (United Kingdom) Neil Adams | (Italy) Ezio Gamba | (East Germany) Günther Krueger (Soviet Union) Evgeny Babanov |
| 78 kg | (East Germany) Harald Heinke | (Soviet Union) Shota Khabareli | (Poland) Adam Adamczyk (Romania) Mihalache Toma |
| 86 kg | (Switzerland) Jürgen Roethlisberger | (Socialist Federal Republic of Yugoslavia) Slavko Obadov | (East Germany) Detlef Ultsch (Hungary) Endre Kiss |
| 95 kg | (Soviet Union) Tengiz Khubuluri | (Belgium) Robert Van de Walle | (West Germany) Günther Neureuther (Austria) Robert Köstenberger |
| 95+ kg | (France) Jean-Luc Rougé | (Soviet Union) Vitaly Kuznetsov | (Netherlands) Peter Adelaar (Hungary) Imre Varga |
| Open class | (Soviet Union) Aleksey Tyurin | (France) Angelo Parisi | (Belgium) Robert Van de Walle (United Kingdom) Paul Radburn |

=== Medal table ===
| Rank | Nation | Gold | Silver | Bronze | Total |
|---|---|---|---|---|---|
| 1 | Soviet Union (URS) | 3 | 2 | 2 | 7 |
| 2 | France (FRA) | 1 | 1 | 1 | 3 |
| 3 | Italy (ITA) | 1 | 1 | 0 | 2 |
| 4 | East Germany (DDR) | 1 | 0 | 2 | 3 |
| 5 | Great Britain (GBR) | 1 | 0 | 1 | 2 |
| 6 | Switzerland (SUI) | 1 | 0 | 0 | 1 |
| 7 | West Germany (FRG) | 0 | 2 | 1 | 3 |
| 8 | Belgium (BEL) | 0 | 1 | 1 | 2 |
| 9 | Yugoslavia (YUG) | 0 | 1 | 0 | 1 |
| 10 | Austria (AUT) | 0 | 0 | 2 | 2 |
| 10 | Hungary (HUN) | 0 | 0 | 2 | 2 |
| 10 | Romania (ROM) | 0 | 0 | 2 | 2 |
| 13 | Netherlands (NED) | 0 | 0 | 1 | 1 |
| 13 | Poland (POL) | 0 | 0 | 1 | 1 |
| Totals (14 entries) | | 8 | 8 | 16 | 32 |
