= Pak Jong-chol =

Pak Jong-chol (박정철) may refer to:

- Pak Jong-chol (judoka) (born 1961)
- Pak Jong-chol (boxer) (born 1987)

== See also ==
- Park Jung-chul (박정철; born 1976), South Korean actor
- Park Jong-chul (박종철; 1965–1987), South Korean democracy movement activist
