= Kase (surname) =

Kase (written: 加瀬) is a Japanese surname. Notable people with the surname include:

- Hideaki Kase (加瀬 英明, 1936–2022), Japanese diplomatic critic
- Jiro Kase (加瀬 次郎, born 1954), Japanese judoka
- Kanako Kase (加瀬 加奈子, born 1980), Japanese professional racing cyclist
- Kiyoshi Kase (加瀬 清), Japanese sport wrestler
- Max Kase (1897–1974), American newspaper editor
- Ryō Kase (加瀬 亮, born 1974), Japanese actor
- Shun'ichi Kase (加瀬 俊一, 1897–1956), Japanese diplomat
- Taiji Kase (加瀬 泰治, 1929–2004), Japanese karate master
- Toshikazu Kase (加瀬 俊一, 1903–2004), Japanese diplomat
- Yasuyuki Kase (加瀬 康之, born 1971), Japanese voice actor

== See also ==
- Kaše, a Czech surname
