= KASE =

KASE may refer to:

- KASE-FM, a radio station (100.7 FM) licensed to Austin, Texas, United States
- Aspen/Pitkin County Airport in Aspen, Colorado, United States
- Kazakhstan Stock Exchange, and its main stock market index
- Kase (surname), a Japanese surname
- Kaše, a Czech surname
