= Mahmoud Saad =

Mahmood Saad may refer to:

- Mahmoud Saad (footballer, born 1952), retired Egyptian footballer and football manager
- Mahmoud Saad (footballer, born 1983), Egyptian footballer currently playing for Al Kharaitiyat SC
- Mahmoud Saad (judoka) (born 1958), Syrian Olympic judoka
