= Major achievements in judo by nation =

This is a list of achievements in major international judo events according to gold, silver and bronze medal results obtained by athletes representing different nations. The objective is not to create a combined medal table; the focus is on listing the best positions achieved by athletes in major global events, ranking the countries according to the most number of podiums accomplished by athletes of these nations. In order to be considered for the making of the list, the competition must be open to athletes from nations across every continent, with no cultural, geographical, political or other sort of limitation preventing participation of athletes. Invitational-only events were not eligible because they might impose subjective limitations on which athletes are allowed to compete.

For the creation of the list only results from adult competitions were consulted; therefore, results achieved at the Youth Olympic Games and at the World Junior Championships were not considered. Master, Grand Prix and Para meets, such as the Paralympic Games, were not taken into consideration. Results from two major judo world tournaments approved by the International Judo Federation were taken into account: the World Judo Championships and the judo tournament at the Summer Olympic Games.

== Results ==
The conventions used on these tables are namely: EL for Extra Lightweight; HL for Half Lightweight; LW for Lightweight; HM for Half Middleweight; MW for Middleweight; HH for Half Heavyweight; HW for Heavyweight; OP for Open class; and TM for Team event.

Notes

- Results achieved in youth or junior events (either at the Youth Olympic Games or the World Junior Championships) were not considered for the making of this table, neither were events for athletes with a disability.
- Medals earned by athletes from defunct NOCs or historical teams have been merged with the results achieved by their immediate successor states, as follows: Russia inherits medals from the Soviet Union and the Unified Team; Serbia inherits medals from Yugoslavia and Serbia and Montenegro; Czech Republic inherits medals from Czechoslovakia; and Germany inherits medals from West Germany and East Germany. The International Olympic Committee does not combine medals of these nations.
- At the 2018 World Championships, judokas from North Korea and South Korea competed as a unified Korean team and won bronze medals in the mixed team competition. These medal were counted for both North Korea and South Korea.
- The tables are pre-sorted by total number of medal results. In case of a tie, countries are then compared according to most number of gold medal results, silver medal results and bronze medal results, respectively. Persisting a tie, equal ranks are given, with countries being listed in alphabetical order.

=== Olympic Games ===
Best judo results by nation at the Olympic Games (1964 – 2024); Last updated after the 2024 Summer Olympics
		Men								Women							Mixed	Number of			
Rk.	Nation	EL	HL	LW	HM	MW	HH	HW	OP	EL	HL	LW	HM	MW	HH	HW	TM	1st place, gold medalist(s)	2nd place, silver medalist(s)	3rd place, bronze medalist(s)	Total
1	Japan	1st place, gold medalist(s)	1st place, gold medalist(s)	1st place, gold medalist(s)	1st place, gold medalist(s)	1st place, gold medalist(s)	1st place, gold medalist(s)	1st place, gold medalist(s)	1st place, gold medalist(s)	1st place, gold medalist(s)	1st place, gold medalist(s)	1st place, gold medalist(s)	1st place, gold medalist(s)	1st place, gold medalist(s)	1st place, gold medalist(s)	1st place, gold medalist(s)	2nd place, silver medalist(s)	15	1	0	16
2	France	1st place, gold medalist(s)	2nd place, silver medalist(s)	1st place, gold medalist(s)	1st place, gold medalist(s)	2nd place, silver medalist(s)	3rd place, bronze medalist(s)	1st place, gold medalist(s)	2nd place, silver medalist(s)	1st place, gold medalist(s)	1st place, gold medalist(s)	2nd place, silver medalist(s)	1st place, gold medalist(s)	1st place, gold medalist(s)	2nd place, silver medalist(s)	1st place, gold medalist(s)	1st place, gold medalist(s)	11	5	1	16
3	South Korea	1st place, gold medalist(s)	1st place, gold medalist(s)	1st place, gold medalist(s)	1st place, gold medalist(s)	1st place, gold medalist(s)	1st place, gold medalist(s)	2nd place, silver medalist(s)	3rd place, bronze medalist(s)	2nd place, silver medalist(s)	2nd place, silver medalist(s)	2nd place, silver medalist(s)	3rd place, bronze medalist(s)	1st place, gold medalist(s)	1st place, gold medalist(s)	3rd place, bronze medalist(s)	3rd place, bronze medalist(s)	8	5	3	16
4	Germany	3rd place, bronze medalist(s)	1st place, gold medalist(s)	2nd place, silver medalist(s)	1st place, gold medalist(s)	2nd place, silver medalist(s)	2nd place, silver medalist(s)	2nd place, silver medalist(s)	1st place, gold medalist(s)	3rd place, bronze medalist(s)		1st place, gold medalist(s)		2nd place, silver medalist(s)	3rd place, bronze medalist(s)	3rd place, bronze medalist(s)	3rd place, bronze medalist(s)	4	5	5	14
5	Russia	1st place, gold medalist(s)	1st place, gold medalist(s)	1st place, gold medalist(s)	1st place, gold medalist(s)	2nd place, silver medalist(s)	1st place, gold medalist(s)	1st place, gold medalist(s)	2nd place, silver medalist(s)	2nd place, silver medalist(s)	3rd place, bronze medalist(s)		3rd place, bronze medalist(s)	3rd place, bronze medalist(s)		3rd place, bronze medalist(s)		6	3	4	13
6	Cuba	2nd place, silver medalist(s)	3rd place, bronze medalist(s)	1st place, gold medalist(s)	2nd place, silver medalist(s)	2nd place, silver medalist(s)		3rd place, bronze medalist(s)		2nd place, silver medalist(s)	1st place, gold medalist(s)	1st place, gold medalist(s)	3rd place, bronze medalist(s)	1st place, gold medalist(s)	2nd place, silver medalist(s)	1st place, gold medalist(s)		5	5	3	13
7	Brazil	3rd place, bronze medalist(s)	1st place, gold medalist(s)	2nd place, silver medalist(s)	3rd place, bronze medalist(s)	2nd place, silver medalist(s)	1st place, gold medalist(s)	3rd place, bronze medalist(s)		1st place, gold medalist(s)		1st place, gold medalist(s)			3rd place, bronze medalist(s)	1st place, gold medalist(s)	3rd place, bronze medalist(s)	5	2	5	12
8	United Kingdom	3rd place, bronze medalist(s)		2nd place, silver medalist(s)	2nd place, silver medalist(s)	3rd place, bronze medalist(s)	2nd place, silver medalist(s)		2nd place, silver medalist(s)		3rd place, bronze medalist(s)	2nd place, silver medalist(s)		2nd place, silver medalist(s)	2nd place, silver medalist(s)	3rd place, bronze medalist(s)		0	7	4	11
9	Belgium			3rd place, bronze medalist(s)	3rd place, bronze medalist(s)		1st place, gold medalist(s)	3rd place, bronze medalist(s)		3rd place, bronze medalist(s)	3rd place, bronze medalist(s)	3rd place, bronze medalist(s)	2nd place, silver medalist(s)	3rd place, bronze medalist(s)	1st place, gold medalist(s)			2	1	7	10
10	Netherlands	3rd place, bronze medalist(s)				1st place, gold medalist(s)	3rd place, bronze medalist(s)	1st place, gold medalist(s)	1st place, gold medalist(s)			2nd place, silver medalist(s)	3rd place, bronze medalist(s)	2nd place, silver medalist(s)	3rd place, bronze medalist(s)			3	2	4	9
11	Italy	2nd place, silver medalist(s)	1st place, gold medalist(s)	1st place, gold medalist(s)							2nd place, silver medalist(s)	1st place, gold medalist(s)	3rd place, bronze medalist(s)	2nd place, silver medalist(s)	1st place, gold medalist(s)			4	3	1	8
12	China					3rd place, bronze medalist(s)				3rd place, bronze medalist(s)	1st place, gold medalist(s)	3rd place, bronze medalist(s)	2nd place, silver medalist(s)	3rd place, bronze medalist(s)	1st place, gold medalist(s)	1st place, gold medalist(s)		3	1	4	8
13	Hungary	3rd place, bronze medalist(s)	2nd place, silver medalist(s)	2nd place, silver medalist(s)		3rd place, bronze medalist(s)	1st place, gold medalist(s)	3rd place, bronze medalist(s)	3rd place, bronze medalist(s)	3rd place, bronze medalist(s)								1	2	5	8
14	Georgia	2nd place, silver medalist(s)	1st place, gold medalist(s)	2nd place, silver medalist(s)	2nd place, silver medalist(s)	1st place, gold medalist(s)	2nd place, silver medalist(s)	2nd place, silver medalist(s)										2	5	0	7
15	Mongolia	3rd place, bronze medalist(s)	2nd place, silver medalist(s)	3rd place, bronze medalist(s)	2nd place, silver medalist(s)		1st place, gold medalist(s)			2nd place, silver medalist(s)		2nd place, silver medalist(s)						1	4	2	7
16	United States	2nd place, silver medalist(s)		3rd place, bronze medalist(s)	2nd place, silver medalist(s)	2nd place, silver medalist(s)		3rd place, bronze medalist(s)				3rd place, bronze medalist(s)			1st place, gold medalist(s)			1	3	3	7
17	Canada			1st place, gold medalist(s)	3rd place, bronze medalist(s)	3rd place, bronze medalist(s)	2nd place, silver medalist(s)	3rd place, bronze medalist(s)				3rd place, bronze medalist(s)	3rd place, bronze medalist(s)					1	1	5	7
18	Israel			3rd place, bronze medalist(s)			3rd place, bronze medalist(s)	3rd place, bronze medalist(s)					2nd place, silver medalist(s)		2nd place, silver medalist(s)	2nd place, silver medalist(s)	3rd place, bronze medalist(s)	0	3	4	7
19	North Korea		3rd place, bronze medalist(s)	3rd place, bronze medalist(s)						1st place, gold medalist(s)	1st place, gold medalist(s)	2nd place, silver medalist(s)	3rd place, bronze medalist(s)					2	1	3	6
20	Austria	2nd place, silver medalist(s)	3rd place, bronze medalist(s)		3rd place, bronze medalist(s)	1st place, gold medalist(s)							2nd place, silver medalist(s)	2nd place, silver medalist(s)				1	3	2	6
21	Uzbekistan	3rd place, bronze medalist(s)	3rd place, bronze medalist(s)			2nd place, silver medalist(s)	3rd place, bronze medalist(s)	2nd place, silver medalist(s)			1st place, gold medalist(s)							1	2	3	6
22	Poland		2nd place, silver medalist(s)		1st place, gold medalist(s)	1st place, gold medalist(s)	1st place, gold medalist(s)							2nd place, silver medalist(s)				3	2	0	5
23	Spain	3rd place, bronze medalist(s)						2nd place, silver medalist(s)		3rd place, bronze medalist(s)	1st place, gold medalist(s)	1st place, gold medalist(s)						2	1	2	5
24	Romania				3rd place, bronze medalist(s)				3rd place, bronze medalist(s)	1st place, gold medalist(s)		2nd place, silver medalist(s)			3rd place, bronze medalist(s)			1	1	3	5
25	Kosovo									1st place, gold medalist(s)	1st place, gold medalist(s)	1st place, gold medalist(s)	3rd place, bronze medalist(s)					3	0	1	4
26	Kazakhstan	1st place, gold medalist(s)	2nd place, silver medalist(s)				2nd place, silver medalist(s)			3rd place, bronze medalist(s)								1	2	1	4
27	Portugal				3rd place, bronze medalist(s)		3rd place, bronze medalist(s)					3rd place, bronze medalist(s)			3rd place, bronze medalist(s)			0	0	4	4
28	Azerbaijan			1st place, gold medalist(s)			1st place, gold medalist(s)									3rd place, bronze medalist(s)		2	0	1	3
29	Switzerland			2nd place, silver medalist(s)		1st place, gold medalist(s)	3rd place, bronze medalist(s)											1	1	1	3
30	Slovenia												1st place, gold medalist(s)		3rd place, bronze medalist(s)	3rd place, bronze medalist(s)		1	0	2	3
31	Ukraine				2nd place, silver medalist(s)	3rd place, bronze medalist(s)				3rd place, bronze medalist(s)								0	1	2	3
32	Tajikistan			3rd place, bronze medalist(s)	3rd place, bronze medalist(s)			3rd place, bronze medalist(s)										0	0	3	3
33	Czech Republic						1st place, gold medalist(s)	1st place, gold medalist(s)										2	0	0	2
34	Belarus			3rd place, bronze medalist(s)			1st place, gold medalist(s)											1	0	1	2
34	Greece				1st place, gold medalist(s)	3rd place, bronze medalist(s)												1	0	1	2
34	Turkey		1st place, gold medalist(s)							3rd place, bronze medalist(s)								1	0	1	2
37	Algeria					2nd place, silver medalist(s)					3rd place, bronze medalist(s)							0	1	1	2
37	Bulgaria		3rd place, bronze medalist(s)					2nd place, silver medalist(s)										0	1	1	2
37	Egypt					3rd place, bronze medalist(s)			2nd place, silver medalist(s)									0	1	1	2
40	Estonia				3rd place, bronze medalist(s)			3rd place, bronze medalist(s)										0	0	2	2
40	Serbia					3rd place, bronze medalist(s)		3rd place, bronze medalist(s)										0	0	2	2
40	Moldova		3rd place, bronze medalist(s)	3rd place, bronze medalist(s)														0	0	2	2
43	Argentina									1st place, gold medalist(s)								1	0	0	1
43	Croatia													1st place, gold medalist(s)				1	0	0	1
45	Colombia													2nd place, silver medalist(s)				0	1	0	1
45	Chinese Taipei	2nd place, silver medalist(s)																0	1	0	1
45	Slovakia		2nd place, silver medalist(s)															0	1	0	1
45	Mexico												2nd place, silver medalist(s)					0	1	0	1
49	Iceland						3rd place, bronze medalist(s)											0	0	1	1
49	Kyrgyzstan	3rd place, bronze medalist(s)																0	0	1	1
49	Latvia			3rd place, bronze medalist(s)														0	0	1	1
49	United Arab Emirates				3rd place, bronze medalist(s)													0	0	1	1
49	Sweden									3rd place, bronze medalist(s)								0	0	1	1

=== World Championships ===
Best international results at the World Judo Championships by nation (1956 – 2025); Last updated after the 2025 World Judo Championships
		Men									Women									Mixed	Number of			
Rk.	Nation	EL	HL	LW	HM	MW	HH	HW	OP	TM	EL	HL	LW	HM	MW	HH	HW	OP	TM	TM	1st place, gold medalist(s)	2nd place, silver medalist(s)	3rd place, bronze medalist(s)	Total
1	Japan	1st place, gold medalist(s)	1st place, gold medalist(s)	1st place, gold medalist(s)	1st place, gold medalist(s)	1st place, gold medalist(s)	1st place, gold medalist(s)	1st place, gold medalist(s)	1st place, gold medalist(s)	1st place, gold medalist(s)	1st place, gold medalist(s)	1st place, gold medalist(s)	1st place, gold medalist(s)	1st place, gold medalist(s)	1st place, gold medalist(s)	1st place, gold medalist(s)	1st place, gold medalist(s)	1st place, gold medalist(s)	1st place, gold medalist(s)	1st place, gold medalist(s)	19	0	0	19
2	France	1st place, gold medalist(s)	1st place, gold medalist(s)	1st place, gold medalist(s)	1st place, gold medalist(s)	1st place, gold medalist(s)	1st place, gold medalist(s)	1st place, gold medalist(s)	1st place, gold medalist(s)	1st place, gold medalist(s)	1st place, gold medalist(s)	1st place, gold medalist(s)	1st place, gold medalist(s)	1st place, gold medalist(s)	1st place, gold medalist(s)	1st place, gold medalist(s)	1st place, gold medalist(s)	1st place, gold medalist(s)	1st place, gold medalist(s)	2nd place, silver medalist(s)	18	1	0	19
3	South Korea	1st place, gold medalist(s)	1st place, gold medalist(s)	1st place, gold medalist(s)	1st place, gold medalist(s)	1st place, gold medalist(s)	1st place, gold medalist(s)	1st place, gold medalist(s)	3rd place, bronze medalist(s)	2nd place, silver medalist(s)	3rd place, bronze medalist(s)	1st place, gold medalist(s)	2nd place, silver medalist(s)	1st place, gold medalist(s)	1st place, gold medalist(s)	1st place, gold medalist(s)	1st place, gold medalist(s)	3rd place, bronze medalist(s)	2nd place, silver medalist(s)	2nd place, silver medalist(s)	12	4	3	19
4	Germany	2nd place, silver medalist(s)	1st place, gold medalist(s)	2nd place, silver medalist(s)	1st place, gold medalist(s)	1st place, gold medalist(s)	1st place, gold medalist(s)	2nd place, silver medalist(s)	2nd place, silver medalist(s)	3rd place, bronze medalist(s)	2nd place, silver medalist(s)	2nd place, silver medalist(s)	2nd place, silver medalist(s)	1st place, gold medalist(s)	1st place, gold medalist(s)	1st place, gold medalist(s)	1st place, gold medalist(s)	1st place, gold medalist(s)	3rd place, bronze medalist(s)	3rd place, bronze medalist(s)	9	7	3	19
5	United Kingdom	1st place, gold medalist(s)	3rd place, bronze medalist(s)	3rd place, bronze medalist(s)	1st place, gold medalist(s)	3rd place, bronze medalist(s)	2nd place, silver medalist(s)	3rd place, bronze medalist(s)	2nd place, silver medalist(s)	2nd place, silver medalist(s)	1st place, gold medalist(s)	1st place, gold medalist(s)	1st place, gold medalist(s)	1st place, gold medalist(s)	1st place, gold medalist(s)	2nd place, silver medalist(s)	2nd place, silver medalist(s)	2nd place, silver medalist(s)			7	6	4	17
6	Netherlands	1st place, gold medalist(s)	3rd place, bronze medalist(s)	2nd place, silver medalist(s)	1st place, gold medalist(s)	1st place, gold medalist(s)	2nd place, silver medalist(s)	1st place, gold medalist(s)	1st place, gold medalist(s)		3rd place, bronze medalist(s)		2nd place, silver medalist(s)	1st place, gold medalist(s)	1st place, gold medalist(s)	1st place, gold medalist(s)	1st place, gold medalist(s)	1st place, gold medalist(s)	1st place, gold medalist(s)		11	3	2	16
7	Russia	1st place, gold medalist(s)	1st place, gold medalist(s)	1st place, gold medalist(s)	1st place, gold medalist(s)	2nd place, silver medalist(s)	1st place, gold medalist(s)	1st place, gold medalist(s)	1st place, gold medalist(s)	1st place, gold medalist(s)		2nd place, silver medalist(s)		2nd place, silver medalist(s)		3rd place, bronze medalist(s)	3rd place, bronze medalist(s)	2nd place, silver medalist(s)	3rd place, bronze medalist(s)	3rd place, bronze medalist(s)	8	4	4	16
8	Poland		3rd place, bronze medalist(s)	3rd place, bronze medalist(s)	3rd place, bronze medalist(s)	3rd place, bronze medalist(s)	1st place, gold medalist(s)	3rd place, bronze medalist(s)	1st place, gold medalist(s)		3rd place, bronze medalist(s)	3rd place, bronze medalist(s)	2nd place, silver medalist(s)	2nd place, silver medalist(s)	3rd place, bronze medalist(s)	3rd place, bronze medalist(s)	1st place, gold medalist(s)	1st place, gold medalist(s)	2nd place, silver medalist(s)		4	3	9	16
9	Cuba	1st place, gold medalist(s)	2nd place, silver medalist(s)			1st place, gold medalist(s)	2nd place, silver medalist(s)	1st place, gold medalist(s)	3rd place, bronze medalist(s)		1st place, gold medalist(s)	1st place, gold medalist(s)	1st place, gold medalist(s)	1st place, gold medalist(s)	1st place, gold medalist(s)	1st place, gold medalist(s)	1st place, gold medalist(s)	1st place, gold medalist(s)	1st place, gold medalist(s)		12	2	1	15
10	Brazil	3rd place, bronze medalist(s)	1st place, gold medalist(s)	2nd place, silver medalist(s)	1st place, gold medalist(s)	3rd place, bronze medalist(s)	1st place, gold medalist(s)	2nd place, silver medalist(s)		2nd place, silver medalist(s)	3rd place, bronze medalist(s)	2nd place, silver medalist(s)	1st place, gold medalist(s)			1st place, gold medalist(s)	2nd place, silver medalist(s)		2nd place, silver medalist(s)	2nd place, silver medalist(s)	5	7	3	15
11	Italy	3rd place, bronze medalist(s)	2nd place, silver medalist(s)	2nd place, silver medalist(s)	2nd place, silver medalist(s)	2nd place, silver medalist(s)				3rd place, bronze medalist(s)	1st place, gold medalist(s)	1st place, gold medalist(s)		2nd place, silver medalist(s)	1st place, gold medalist(s)	1st place, gold medalist(s)	1st place, gold medalist(s)		3rd place, bronze medalist(s)	3rd place, bronze medalist(s)	5	5	4	14
12	Belgium	2nd place, silver medalist(s)		3rd place, bronze medalist(s)	1st place, gold medalist(s)		2nd place, silver medalist(s)		2nd place, silver medalist(s)		3rd place, bronze medalist(s)	3rd place, bronze medalist(s)	2nd place, silver medalist(s)	1st place, gold medalist(s)	2nd place, silver medalist(s)	1st place, gold medalist(s)	3rd place, bronze medalist(s)	1st place, gold medalist(s)	3rd place, bronze medalist(s)		4	5	5	14
13	Spain	1st place, gold medalist(s)	2nd place, silver medalist(s)	2nd place, silver medalist(s)		1st place, gold medalist(s)	3rd place, bronze medalist(s)				2nd place, silver medalist(s)	2nd place, silver medalist(s)	1st place, gold medalist(s)	2nd place, silver medalist(s)	2nd place, silver medalist(s)	3rd place, bronze medalist(s)		2nd place, silver medalist(s)			3	7	2	12
14	Georgia	1st place, gold medalist(s)	3rd place, bronze medalist(s)	1st place, gold medalist(s)	1st place, gold medalist(s)	1st place, gold medalist(s)	2nd place, silver medalist(s)	1st place, gold medalist(s)	2nd place, silver medalist(s)	1st place, gold medalist(s)			1st place, gold medalist(s)							1st place, gold medalist(s)	8	2	1	11
15	Mongolia	1st place, gold medalist(s)	1st place, gold medalist(s)	1st place, gold medalist(s)			2nd place, silver medalist(s)	3rd place, bronze medalist(s)		3rd place, bronze medalist(s)	1st place, gold medalist(s)	3rd place, bronze medalist(s)	1st place, gold medalist(s)	3rd place, bronze medalist(s)					2nd place, silver medalist(s)		5	2	4	11
16	Uzbekistan	1st place, gold medalist(s)	3rd place, bronze medalist(s)	3rd place, bronze medalist(s)	2nd place, silver medalist(s)	1st place, gold medalist(s)	1st place, gold medalist(s)	3rd place, bronze medalist(s)	1st place, gold medalist(s)	2nd place, silver medalist(s)		2nd place, silver medalist(s)								3rd place, bronze medalist(s)	4	3	4	11
17	United States	3rd place, bronze medalist(s)	3rd place, bronze medalist(s)	1st place, gold medalist(s)	3rd place, bronze medalist(s)	2nd place, silver medalist(s)					3rd place, bronze medalist(s)		1st place, gold medalist(s)	2nd place, silver medalist(s)	2nd place, silver medalist(s)	1st place, gold medalist(s)	2nd place, silver medalist(s)				3	4	4	11
18	Hungary	2nd place, silver medalist(s)	3rd place, bronze medalist(s)	1st place, gold medalist(s)		2nd place, silver medalist(s)	1st place, gold medalist(s)	3rd place, bronze medalist(s)	2nd place, silver medalist(s)		3rd place, bronze medalist(s)		3rd place, bronze medalist(s)	3rd place, bronze medalist(s)	2nd place, silver medalist(s)						2	4	5	11
19	China							3rd place, bronze medalist(s)		3rd place, bronze medalist(s)	1st place, gold medalist(s)	1st place, gold medalist(s)	3rd place, bronze medalist(s)		3rd place, bronze medalist(s)	1st place, gold medalist(s)	1st place, gold medalist(s)	1st place, gold medalist(s)	1st place, gold medalist(s)		6	0	4	10
20	Azerbaijan	2nd place, silver medalist(s)		1st place, gold medalist(s)	3rd place, bronze medalist(s)	3rd place, bronze medalist(s)	1st place, gold medalist(s)	2nd place, silver medalist(s)	3rd place, bronze medalist(s)				3rd place, bronze medalist(s)	3rd place, bronze medalist(s)			3rd place, bronze medalist(s)				2	2	6	10
21	North Korea			2nd place, silver medalist(s)	3rd place, bronze medalist(s)	2nd place, silver medalist(s)					2nd place, silver medalist(s)	1st place, gold medalist(s)	1st place, gold medalist(s)			1st place, gold medalist(s)			2nd place, silver medalist(s)	3rd place, bronze medalist(s)	3	4	2	9
22	Israel		3rd place, bronze medalist(s)		1st place, gold medalist(s)		3rd place, bronze medalist(s)		2nd place, silver medalist(s)			3rd place, bronze medalist(s)		1st place, gold medalist(s)		1st place, gold medalist(s)	3rd place, bronze medalist(s)			3rd place, bronze medalist(s)	3	1	5	9
23	Portugal			3rd place, bronze medalist(s)	3rd place, bronze medalist(s)		1st place, gold medalist(s)					2nd place, silver medalist(s)	2nd place, silver medalist(s)	3rd place, bronze medalist(s)	2nd place, silver medalist(s)	3rd place, bronze medalist(s)		3rd place, bronze medalist(s)			1	3	5	9
24	Ukraine	1st place, gold medalist(s)	2nd place, silver medalist(s)	3rd place, bronze medalist(s)	3rd place, bronze medalist(s)		2nd place, silver medalist(s)	3rd place, bronze medalist(s)			1st place, gold medalist(s)					2nd place, silver medalist(s)					2	3	3	8
25	Turkey		2nd place, silver medalist(s)	3rd place, bronze medalist(s)	3rd place, bronze medalist(s)			2nd place, silver medalist(s)	2nd place, silver medalist(s)		3rd place, bronze medalist(s)						2nd place, silver medalist(s)		3rd place, bronze medalist(s)		0	4	4	8
26	Austria	2nd place, silver medalist(s)			3rd place, bronze medalist(s)	1st place, gold medalist(s)						1st place, gold medalist(s)	1st place, gold medalist(s)		1st place, gold medalist(s)	3rd place, bronze medalist(s)					4	1	2	7
27	Canada	3rd place, bronze medalist(s)			2nd place, silver medalist(s)	2nd place, silver medalist(s)	2nd place, silver medalist(s)	3rd place, bronze medalist(s)					1st place, gold medalist(s)	2nd place, silver medalist(s)							1	4	2	7
28	Romania		2nd place, silver medalist(s)		3rd place, bronze medalist(s)	3rd place, bronze medalist(s)		3rd place, bronze medalist(s)			3rd place, bronze medalist(s)	2nd place, silver medalist(s)	2nd place, silver medalist(s)								0	3	4	7
29	Serbia		1st place, gold medalist(s)	3rd place, bronze medalist(s)		1st place, gold medalist(s)	2nd place, silver medalist(s)		3rd place, bronze medalist(s)					3rd place, bronze medalist(s)				3rd place, bronze medalist(s)			2	1	3	6
30	Slovenia					2nd place, silver medalist(s)							3rd place, bronze medalist(s)	1st place, gold medalist(s)	3rd place, bronze medalist(s)	2nd place, silver medalist(s)		2nd place, silver medalist(s)			1	3	2	6
31	Belarus	3rd place, bronze medalist(s)			2nd place, silver medalist(s)	3rd place, bronze medalist(s)	3rd place, bronze medalist(s)		2nd place, silver medalist(s)			3rd place, bronze medalist(s)									0	2	4	6
32	Czech Republic	2nd place, silver medalist(s)					1st place, gold medalist(s)	1st place, gold medalist(s)	2nd place, silver medalist(s)				3rd place, bronze medalist(s)								2	2	1	5
32	Kazakhstan	1st place, gold medalist(s)	2nd place, silver medalist(s)	3rd place, bronze medalist(s)			1st place, gold medalist(s)				2nd place, silver medalist(s)										2	2	1	5
34	Switzerland		2nd place, silver medalist(s)	1st place, gold medalist(s)	2nd place, silver medalist(s)						3rd place, bronze medalist(s)	3rd place, bronze medalist(s)									1	2	2	5
35	Kosovo										3rd place, bronze medalist(s)	1st place, gold medalist(s)	3rd place, bronze medalist(s)	3rd place, bronze medalist(s)		3rd place, bronze medalist(s)					1	0	4	5
36	Tajikistan		2nd place, silver medalist(s)	3rd place, bronze medalist(s)	3rd place, bronze medalist(s)			3rd place, bronze medalist(s)					3rd place, bronze medalist(s)								0	1	4	5
37	Iran		1st place, gold medalist(s)	3rd place, bronze medalist(s)	1st place, gold medalist(s)			3rd place, bronze medalist(s)													2	0	2	4
38	Tunisia	1st place, gold medalist(s)						3rd place, bronze medalist(s)							3rd place, bronze medalist(s)			3rd place, bronze medalist(s)			1	0	3	4
39	Egypt					3rd place, bronze medalist(s)	3rd place, bronze medalist(s)	2nd place, silver medalist(s)	2nd place, silver medalist(s)												0	2	2	4
39	Sweden			2nd place, silver medalist(s)		3rd place, bronze medalist(s)					3rd place, bronze medalist(s)				2nd place, silver medalist(s)						0	2	2	4
41	Bulgaria				3rd place, bronze medalist(s)	2nd place, silver medalist(s)		3rd place, bronze medalist(s)										3rd place, bronze medalist(s)			0	1	3	4
42	Argentina										1st place, gold medalist(s)	2nd place, silver medalist(s)		1st place, gold medalist(s)							2	1	0	3
43	Estonia				2nd place, silver medalist(s)			2nd place, silver medalist(s)	2nd place, silver medalist(s)												0	3	0	3
44	Australia										3rd place, bronze medalist(s)	3rd place, bronze medalist(s)	2nd place, silver medalist(s)								0	1	2	3
44	Moldova		3rd place, bronze medalist(s)		3rd place, bronze medalist(s)	2nd place, silver medalist(s)															0	1	2	3
46	Greece					1st place, gold medalist(s)							3rd place, bronze medalist(s)								1	0	1	2
47	Algeria				2nd place, silver medalist(s)						3rd place, bronze medalist(s)										0	1	1	2
47	Bosnia and Herzegovina																3rd place, bronze medalist(s)	2nd place, silver medalist(s)			0	1	1	2
47	Norway													2nd place, silver medalist(s)	3rd place, bronze medalist(s)						0	1	1	2
50	Puerto Rico														3rd place, bronze medalist(s)		3rd place, bronze medalist(s)				0	0	2	2
50	United Arab Emirates			3rd place, bronze medalist(s)			3rd place, bronze medalist(s)														0	0	2	2
50	Finland		3rd place, bronze medalist(s)					3rd place, bronze medalist(s)													0	0	2	2
53	Colombia														1st place, gold medalist(s)						1	0	0	1
53	Venezuela													1st place, gold medalist(s)							1	0	0	1
53	Croatia														1st place, gold medalist(s)						1	0	0	1
56	Montenegro				2nd place, silver medalist(s)																0	1	0	1
56	Chinese Taipei	2nd place, silver medalist(s)																			0	1	0	1
58	Armenia	3rd place, bronze medalist(s)																			0	0	1	1
58	Latvia			3rd place, bronze medalist(s)																	0	0	1	1
58	Lithuania							3rd place, bronze medalist(s)													0	0	1	1
58	New Zealand													3rd place, bronze medalist(s)							0	0	1	1
58	Kyrgyzstan					3rd place, bronze medalist(s)															0	0	1	1

== See also ==
- Asian Judo Championships
- Judo at the Asian Games
- European Judo Championships
- Judo at the Pan American Games
- List of major achievements in sports by nation
