= Aleksandrs Jackēvičs =

Latvian judoka (born 1958)

Personal information
- Born: 25 March 1958 (age 68)
- Occupation: Judoka

Sport
- Country: Soviet Union
- Sport: Judo
- Weight class: ‍–‍86 kg

Achievements and titles
- Olympic Games: (bronze) (1980)
- World Champ.: R16 (1979)
- European Champ.: (gold) (1978, 1980, 1982)
Medal record
Men's judo
Representing Soviet Union
Olympic Games
Bronze medal – third place	1980 Moscow	‍–‍86 kg
European Championships
Gold medal – first place	1978 Helsinki	‍–‍86 kg
Gold medal – first place	1980 Vienna	‍–‍86 kg
Gold medal – first place	1982 Rostock	‍–‍86 kg
World Juniors Championships
Gold medal – first place	1976 Madrid	‍–‍80 kg
European Junior Championships
Gold medal – first place	1976 Lodz	‍–‍80 kg
Bronze medal – third place	1977 Berlin	‍–‍78 kg
European Cadet Championships
Gold medal – first place	1975 Turku	‍–‍75 kg

Profile at external databases
- IJF: 54259
- JudoInside.com: 5811
- Updated on 20 June 2023

Aleksandrs Jackēvičs (born 25 March 1958 in Dobele) is a Latvian judoka. He competed for the Soviet Union at the 1980 Summer Olympics and won a bronze medal in the middleweight class.
