= Krzysztof Kurczyna =

Polish judoka

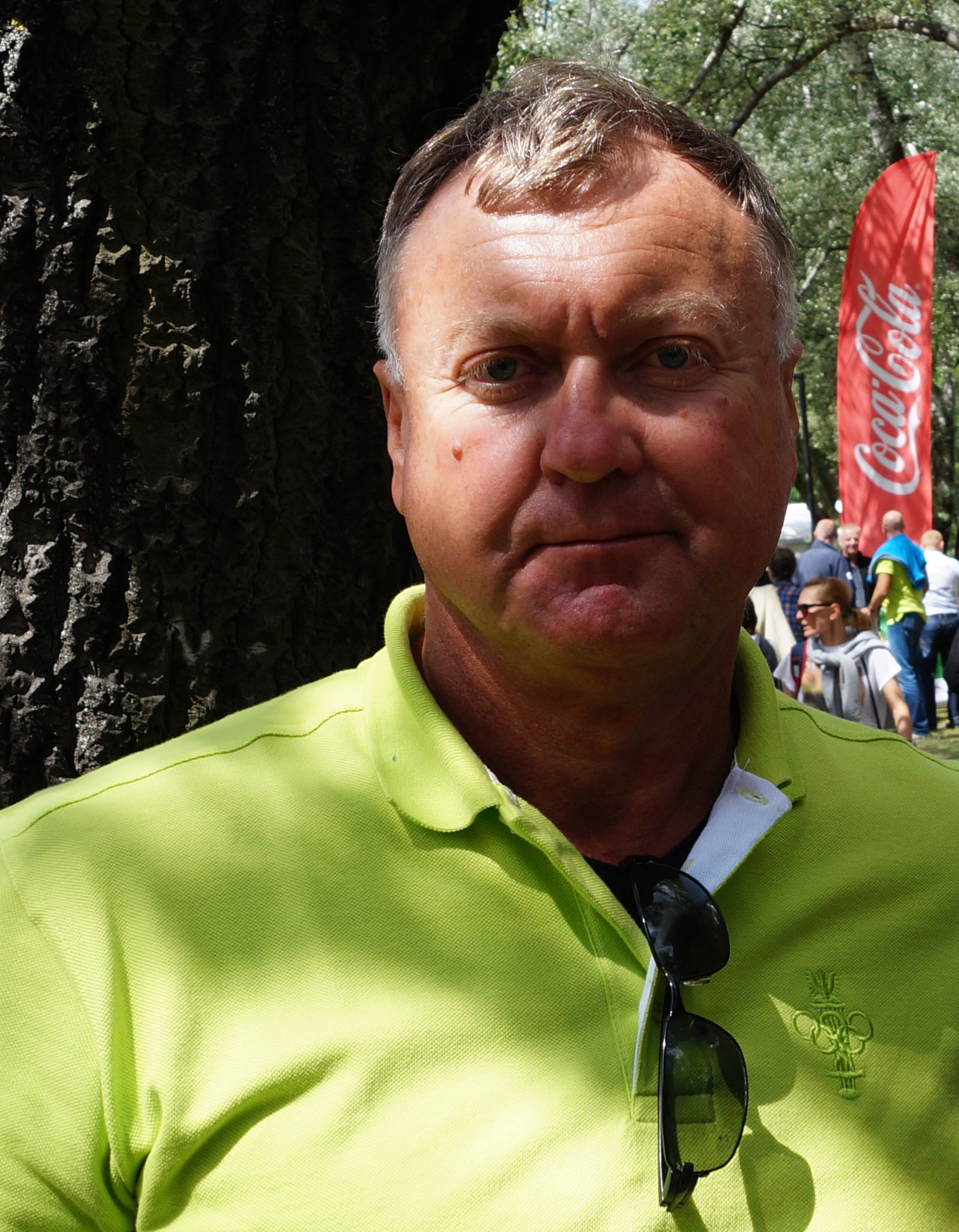

Personal information
- Nationality: Polish
- Born: 15 April 1961 (age 65) Bielsko-Biała, Poland

Sport
- Sport: Judo
Medal record
Men's Judo
Friendship Games
Bronze medal – third place	1984 Moscow	Middleweight 86 kg

Krzysztof Kurczyna (born 15 April 1961) is a Polish judoka. He competed in the men's middleweight event at the 1980 Summer Olympics.
