= Judo at the Friendship Games =

Judo at the Friendship Games was held at the Military University of Technology sports hall in Warsaw, Poland between 24 and 26 August 1984. Judokas contested in eight events (all men's) – seven weight classes and one open category.

== Medal summary ==
Event	Gold	Silver	Bronze
Extra Lightweight; 60 kg	Andrzej Dziemianiuk (POL)	Khazret Tletseri (URS)	Pavel Petřikov (TCH) Atanas Gerchev (BUL)
Half Lightweight; 65 kg	Nikolai Soloduhin (URS)	Andreas Paluschek (GDR)	Emil Damianov (BUL) Galadangin Zamsran (MGL)
Lightweight; 71 kg	Sándor Nagysolymosi (HUN)	Tamaz Namgalauri (URS)	Wiesław Błach (POL) Karl-Heinz Lehmann (GDR)
Half Middleweight; 78 kg	Yuri Merkulov (URS)	Un-Riong Ro (PRK)	Zhambalyn Ganbold (MGL) Andrzej Sądej (POL)
Middleweight; 86 kg	Vitali Pesniak (URS)	Karel Purkert (TCH)	Odvogin Baljinnyam (MGL) Krzysztof Kurczyna (POL)
Half Heavyweight; 95 kg	Zbigniew Bielawski (POL)	Isaac Azcuy (CUB)	Valery Divisenko (URS) Lajos Molnár (HUN)
Heavyweight +95 kg	Grigory Verichev (URS)	Dimitar Zaprianov (BUL)	Henry Stöhr (GDR) Krzysztof Szabat (POL)
Open category	Khabil Biktachev (URS)	Vladimír Kocman (TCH)	Dietmar Pufahl (GDR) Wojciech Reszko (POL)

== Medal table ==
* Host nation (Poland)

Rank	Nation	Gold	Silver	Bronze	Total
1	Soviet Union (URS)	5	2	1	8
2	Poland (POL)*	2	0	5	7
3	Hungary (HUN)	1	0	1	2
4	Czechoslovakia (TCH)	0	2	1	3
5	East Germany (GDR)	0	1	3	4
6	Bulgaria (BUL)	0	1	2	3
7	Cuba (CUB)	0	1	0	1
7	North Korea (PRK)	0	1	0	1
9	Mongolia (MGL)	0	0	3	3
Totals (9 entries)		8	8	16	32

== See also ==
- Judo at the 1984 Summer Olympics
