= Peter Donnelly (judoka) =

British judoka

Personal information
- Nationality: British
- Born: 3 February 1951 (age 74)

Sport
- Sport: Judo

Peter Donnelly (born 3 December 1951) is a British judoka. He competed in the men's middleweight event at the 1980 Summer Olympics.
