= Bertil Ström =

Swedish judoka

Personal information
- Nationality: Swedish
- Born: 3 January 1953 (age 72); Helsingborg, Sweden

Sport
- Sport: Judo

Bertil Ström (born 3 January 1953) is a Swedish judoka. He competed in the men's middleweight event at the 1980 Summer Olympics.
