= Pak Jong-chol (judoka) =

North Korean judoka (born 1961)

Personal information
- Born: 2 June 1961 (age 65)
- Occupation: Judoka

Sport
- Country: North Korea
- Sport: Judo
- Weight class: ‍–‍86 kg

Achievements and titles
- Olympic Games: R16 (1980)
- World Champ.: (silver) (1987)
- Asian Champ.: (bronze) (1990)
Medal record
Men's judo
Representing North Korea
World Championships
Silver medal – second place	1987 Essen	‍–‍86 kg
Asian Games
Bronze medal – third place	1990 Beijing	‍–‍86 kg

Profile at external databases
- IJF: 10029
- JudoInside.com: 6105
- Updated on 3 July 2025

Pak Jong-chol (born 2 June 1961) is a North Korean judoka. He competed in the men's middleweight event at the 1980 Summer Olympics.
