= Jürg Röthlisberger =

Swiss judoka (born 1955)

Personal information
- Born: 2 February 1955 (age 71)
- Occupation: Judoka

Sport
- Country: Switzerland
- Sport: Judo
- Weight class: –86 kg, –93 kg
- Rank: 6th dan black belt

Achievements and titles
- Olympic Games: (gold) (1980)
- World Champ.: R16 (1979)
- European Champ.: (gold) (1979)
Medal record
Men's judo
Representing Switzerland
Olympic Games
Gold medal – first place	1980 Moscow	‍–‍86 kg
Bronze medal – third place	1976 Montreal	‍–‍93 kg
European Championships
Gold medal – first place	1979 Brussels	‍–‍86 kg
Silver medal – second place	1977 Ludwigshafen	‍–‍86 kg
Bronze medal – third place	1978 Helsinki	‍–‍86 kg
European Junior Championships
Bronze medal – third place	1974 Tel Aviv	‍–‍80 kg

Profile at external databases
- IJF: 54270
- JudoInside.com: 6175
- Updated on 20 June 2023

Jürg Röthlisberger (born 2 February 1955) is a Swiss judoka and olympic champion. He won a gold medal in the middleweight division at the 1980 Summer Olympics in Moscow.
