= Donald Mukahatesho =

Zambian judoka

Personal information
- Nationality: Zambian

Sport
- Sport: Judo

Donald Mukahatesho is a Zambian judoka. He competed in the men's middleweight event at the 1980 Summer Olympics. He placed 9th overall.
