= Henri-Richard Lobe =

Cameroonian judoka (born 1945)

Personal information
- Nationality: Cameroonian
- Born: 20 June 1945 (age 79)

Sport
- Sport: Judo

Henri-Richard Lobe (born 20 June 1945) is a Cameroonian judoka. He competed in the men's middleweight event at the 1980 Summer Olympics.
