= Milton Estrella =

Ecuadorian judoka

Personal information
- Nationality: Ecuadorian
- Born: 15 October 1954 (age 70)

Sport
- Sport: Judo

Milton Estrella (born 15 October 1954) is an Ecuadorian judoka. He competed in the men's middleweight event at the 1980 Summer Olympics.
