= Aramby Emizh =

Russian judoka

Personal information
- Born: 9 February 1953 (age 73)
- Occupation: Judoka

Sport
- Country: Soviet Union
- Sport: Judo
- Weight class: ‍–‍60 kg

Achievements and titles
- Olympic Games: (bronze) (1980)
- World Champ.: 5th (1979)
- European Champ.: (bronze) (1979)
Medal record
Men's judo
Representing Soviet Union
Olympic Games
Bronze medal – third place	1980 Moscow	‍–‍60 kg
European Championships
Bronze medal – third place	1979 Brussels	‍–‍60 kg

Profile at external databases
- IJF: 54206
- JudoInside.com: 29560
- Updated on 19 June 2023

Aramby Ibragimovich Emizh (Russian: Арамбий Ибрагимович Емиж, born 9 February 1953) is a Russian judoka who competed for the Soviet Union at the 1980 Summer Olympics, where he won a bronze medal in the extra lightweight class.
