= 1981 World Judo Championships =

Judo competition

Judo 1981 Men's World Judo Championships
- Venue: Maastricht
- Location: Maastricht, Netherlands
- Dates: 3–6 September 1981
- Competitors: 255 from 51 nations

Competition at external databases
- Links: IJF • JudoInside

The 1981 World Judo Championships were the 12th edition of the men's World Judo Championships, and were held in Maastricht, the Netherlands from 3–6 September, 1981.

== Medal overview ==
=== Men ===
Event	Gold	Silver	Bronze
-60 kg	(Japan) Yasuhiko Moriwaki	(Czechoslovakia) Pavel Petřikov	(Italy) Felice Mariani (Canada) Phil Takahashi
-65 kg	(Japan) Katsuhiko Kashiwazaki	(Romania) Constantin Niculae	(South Korea) Hwang Jung-Oh (Soviet Union) Petr Ponomarev
-71 kg	(South Korea) Park Chong-hak	(France) Serge Dyot	(East Germany) Karl-Heinz Lehmann (Socialist Federal Republic of Yugoslavia) Vojo Vujevic
-78 kg	(United Kingdom) Neil Adams	(Japan) Jiro Kase	(Canada) Kevin Doherty (Bulgaria) Georgi Petrov
-86 kg	(France) Bernard Tchoullouyan	(Japan) Seiki Nose	(Soviet Union) David Bodaveli (East Germany) Detlef Ultsch
-95 kg	(Soviet Union) Tengiz Khubuluri	(Belgium) Robert van de Walle	(South Korea) Ha Hyung-Joo (France) Roger Vachon
+95 kg	(Japan) Yasuhiro Yamashita	(Soviet Union) Grigory Verichev	(Czechoslovakia) Vladimir Kocman (Finland) Juha Salonen
Open	(Japan) Yasuhiro Yamashita	(Poland) Wojciech Reszko	(Hungary) Andras Ozsvar (Belgium) Robert van de Walle

=== Medal table ===
Rank	Nation	Gold	Silver	Bronze	Total
1	Japan (JPN)	4	2	0	6
2	Soviet Union (URS)	1	1	2	4
3	France (FRA)	1	1	1	3
4	South Korea (KOR)	1	0	2	3
5	Great Britain (GBR)	1	0	0	1
6	Belgium (BEL)	0	1	1	2
6	Czechoslovakia (TCH)	0	1	1	2
8	Poland (POL)	0	1	0	1
8	Romania (ROM)	0	1	0	1
10	Canada (CAN)	0	0	2	2
10	East Germany (GDR)	0	0	2	2
12	Bulgaria (BUL)	0	0	1	1
12	Finland (FIN)	0	0	1	1
12	Hungary (HUN)	0	0	1	1
12	Italy (ITA)	0	0	1	1
12	Yugoslavia (SFR Yugoslavia)	0	0	1	1
Totals (16 entries)		8	8	16	32
