= 1978 European Judo Championships =

1978 Judo European Judo Championships
- Location: Helsinki, Finland
- Dates: 5–7 May 1978

Competition at external databases
- Links: JudoInside

The 1978 European Judo Championships were the 28th edition of the European Judo Championships, and were held in Helsinki, Finland from 5 to 7 May 1978. The victors were East Germany. The 1978 European Team Championships took place in Paris on 21 and 22 October 1978. The team event also being organized separately from this year edition onwards. The European Women's Championships were held in Cologne, West Germany, in November of the same year.

== Medal overview ==
Event	Gold	Silver	Bronze
60 kg	(Italy) Felice Mariani	(Romania) Arpad Szabo	(East Germany) Reinhard Arndt (Soviet Union) Evgeny Pogorelov
65 kg	(East Germany) Torsten Reißmann	(Soviet Union) Nikolay Solodukhin	(Hungary) József Tuncsik (Socialist Federal Republic of Yugoslavia) Dragan Kosic
71 kg	(East Germany) Günter Krüger	(West Germany) Engelbert Dörbandt	(United Kingdom) Neil Adams (Hungary) Károly Molnar
78 kg	(East Germany) Harald Heinke	(Poland) Adam Adamczyk	(France) Bernard Choullouyan (Austria) Jerzy Jatowtt
86 kg	(Soviet Union) Alexander Yatskevich	(East Germany) Detlef Ultsch	(West Germany) Wolfgang Frank (Switzerland) Jürgen Roethlisberger
95 kg	(East Germany) Dietmar Lorenz	(France) Angelo Parisi	(Belgium) Robert Van De Walle (Soviet Union) Vladimir Gurin
95+ kg	(Netherlands) Peter Adelaar	(Hungary) Imre Varga	(France) Jean-Luc Rougé (Soviet Union) Sergey Novikov
Open class	(East Germany) Dietmar Lorenz	(France) Jean-Luc Rougé	(Hungary) Imre Varga (Soviet Union) Dzhibilo Nizharadze

=== Medal table ===
Rank	Nation	Gold	Silver	Bronze	Total
1	East Germany (DDR)	5	1	1	7
2	Soviet Union (URS)	1	1	4	6
3	Italy (ITA)	1	0	0	1
3	Netherlands (NED)	1	0	0	1
5	Hungary (HUN)	0	2	3	5
6	France (FRA)	0	2	2	4
7	West Germany (FRG)	0	1	1	2
8	Poland (POL)	0	1	0	1
9	Austria (AUT)	0	0	1	1
9	Belgium (BEL)	0	0	1	1
9	Great Britain (GBR)	0	0	1	1
9	Switzerland (SUI)	0	0	1	1
9	Yugoslavia (YUG)	0	0	1	1
Totals (13 entries)		8	8	16	32
