= Mark Carew =

Australian judoka

Personal information
- Nationality: Australian
- Born: 3 September 1954 (age 70)

Sport
- Sport: Judo

Mark Carew (born 3 September 1954) is an Australian judoka. He competed in the men's middleweight event at the 1980 Summer Olympics.
