= Shota Khabareli =

Georgian judoka (born 1958)

Personal information
- Born: 26 December 1958 (age 67)
- Occupation: Judoka

Sport
- Country: Soviet Union
- Sport: Judo
- Weight class: ‍–‍78 kg

Achievements and titles
- Olympic Games: (gold) (1980)
- World Champ.: (bronze) (1983)
- European Champ.: (silver) (1979, 1982)
Medal record
Men's judo
Representing Soviet Union
Olympic Games
Gold medal – first place	1980 Moscow	‍–‍78 kg
World Championships
Bronze medal – third place	1983 Moscow	‍–‍78 kg
European Championships
Silver medal – second place	1979 Brussels	‍–‍78 kg
Silver medal – second place	1982 Rostock	‍–‍78 kg
Bronze medal – third place	1981 Debrecen	‍–‍78 kg
Bronze medal – third place	1983 Paris	‍–‍78 kg

Profile at external databases
- IJF: 793
- JudoInside.com: 5821
- Updated on 20 June 2023

Shota Khabareli (Georgian: შოთა ხაბარელი; born 26 December 1958) is a Georgian judoka who competed for the Soviet Union at the 1980 Summer Olympics, where he won the gold medal in the half-middleweight class.

Khabareli was a bronze medallist in the 1983 World Championships in Moscow and two times silver medalist in the European Championships; first in Brussels 1979 and again in Rostock 1982. Khabareli also won continental bronze medals in Debrecen 1981 and Paris 1983.

Khabareli was a champion of the international tournaments in Warsaw in 1978 and Hungary in 1979. He was also a silver medalist in Budapest in 1985 and bronze medallist of the Jigoro Kano Cup in Tokyo in 1982.

Khabareli is famous for the knee lift throw, also known in sumo as yagura nage.
