= Isaac Azcuy =

Cuban Olympic judoka

Personal information
- Full name: Isaac Azcuy Oliva
- Born: 3 June 1953 (age 73)
- Occupation: Judoka

Sport
- Country: Cuba
- Sport: Judo
- Weight class: ‍–‍80 kg, ‍–‍86 kg, ‍–‍95 kg

Achievements and titles
- Olympic Games: (silver) (1980)
- World Champ.: 5th (1983)
- Pan American Champ.: (1974, 1978, 1984)
Medal record
Men's judo
Representing Cuba
Olympic Games
Silver medal – second place	1980 Moscow	‍–‍86 kg
Pan American Games
Gold medal – first place	1983 Caracas	‍–‍95 kg
Pan American Championships
Gold medal – first place	1974 Panama City	‍–‍80 kg
Gold medal – first place	1978 Buenos Aires	‍–‍86 kg
Gold medal – first place	1984 Mexico CIty	‍–‍95 kg
Bronze medal – third place	1985 Havana	‍–‍95 kg
Friendship Games
Bronze medal – third place	1984 Moscow	‍–‍95 kg

Profile at external databases
- IJF: 54280
- JudoInside.com: 954
- Updated on 20 June 2023

Isaac Azcuy Oliva (Note: In this Spanish name, the first or paternal surname is Azcuy and the second or maternal family name is Oliva.) (born 3 June 1953) is a Cuban former judoka who competed in the 1972 Summer Olympics and in the 1980 Summer Olympics.
