= Jiro Kase =

Japanese judoka (born 1954)

Medal record

Representing Japan

Men's Judo

World Championships
Silver medal – second place	1981 Maastricht	-78 kg

Jiro Kase (加瀬 次郎, Kase Jirō; born 27 December 1954) is a retired Japanese judoka.

Kase is from Sumida, Tokyo and began judo at Kodokan at the age of a 4th grader. He belonged to Keiyo Gas Co., Ltd after graduation from Meiji University in 1977.

In 1981, he won a silver medal at the World Championships held in Maastricht. He also participated All-Japan Championships 5 times from 1977 to 1985.

As of 2010, Kase coaches judo at Keiyo Gas.

== Achievements ==
- 1976 - Kodokan Cup (-78 kg) 2nd

- All-Japan University Championships (-78 kg) 1st

- 1979 - All-Japan Selected Championships (-78 kg) 3rd

- Kodokan Cup (-60 kg) 2nd

- 1980 - Pacific Rim Championships (-78 kg) 1st

- All-Japan Selected Championships (-78 kg) 3rd
- Kodokan Cup (-60 kg) 3rd

- 1981 - World Championships (-78 kg) 2nd

- Pacific Rim Championships (-78 kg) 1st
- All-Japan Selected Championships (-78 kg) 1st
- Kodokan Cup (-60 kg) 3rd

- 1983 - All-Japan Selected Championships (-78 kg) 2nd

- Kodokan Cup (-60 kg) 2nd

- 1984 - All-Japan Selected Championships (-78 kg) 3rd

- Kodokan Cup (-60 kg) 1st
