= Nikolay Solodukhin =

Russian judoka

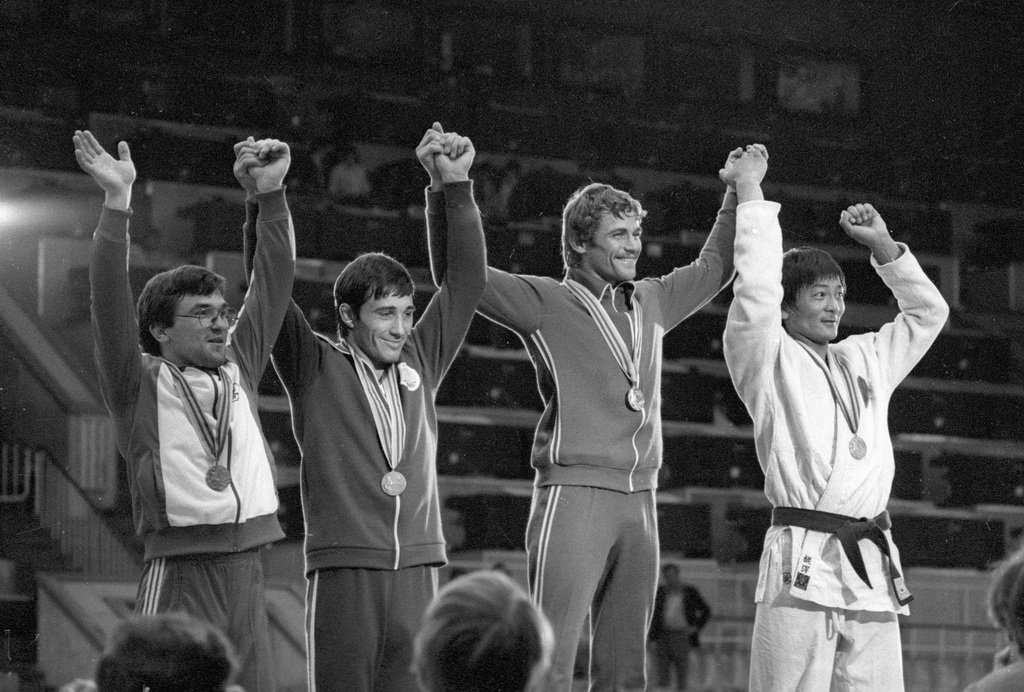
- Nikolay Solodukhin (center right) at the pedestal

Personal information
- Born: 3 January 1955 (age 71) Village Paserkovo, Mikhailovsky Raion, Kursk Oblast, Russian SFSR, Soviet Union
- Occupation: Judoka
- Height: 164 cm (5 ft 5 in)

Sport
- Country: Soviet Union
- Sport: Judo
- Weight class: ‍–‍65 kg

Achievements and titles
- Olympic Games: (gold) (1980)
- World Champ.: (1979, 1983)
- European Champ.: (gold) (1979)
Medal record
Men's judo
Representing Soviet Union
Olympic Games
Gold medal – first place	1980 Moscow	‍–‍65 kg
World Championships
Gold medal – first place	1979 Paris	‍–‍65 kg
Gold medal – first place	1983 Moscow	‍–‍65 kg
European Championships
Gold medal – first place	1979 Brussels	‍–‍65 kg
Silver medal – second place	1978 Helsinki	‍–‍65 kg
Bronze medal – third place	1983 Paris	‍–‍65 kg

Profile at external databases
- IJF: 54212
- JudoInside.com: 5896
- Updated on 19 June 2023

Nikolay Ivanovich Solodukhin (Russian: Николай Иванович Солодухин, born 3 January 1955) is a Soviet judoka. He was born in Kursk Oblast.

Solodukhin competed for the Soviet Union at the 1980 Summer Olympics, where he won a gold medal in the half lightweight class. In the 1983 World Championships he won gold in the ‍–‍65 kg class.
