= Michel Sanchis =

French judoka

Personal information
- Nationality: French
- Born: 3 September 1951 (age 73)

Sport
- Sport: Judo

Michel Sanchis (born 3 September 1951) is a French judoka. He competed in the men's middleweight event at the 1980 Summer Olympics.
