= Tengiz Khubuluri =

Georgian judoka (born 1955)

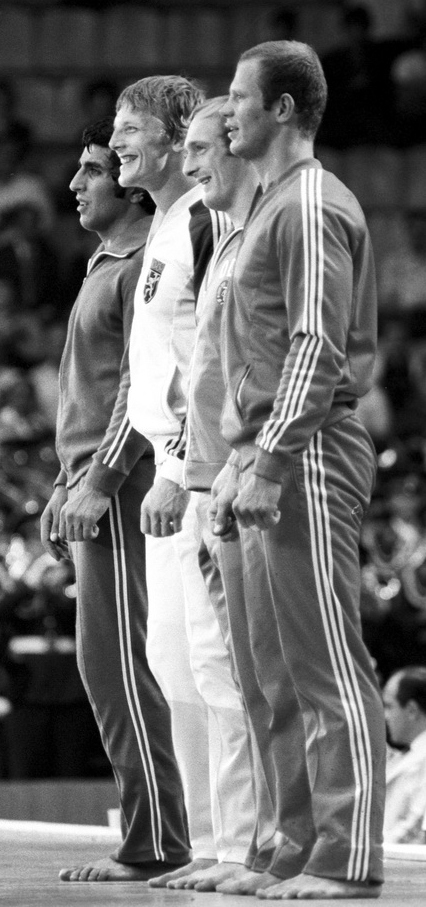
- Khubuluri (far left) at the 1980 Olympics

Personal information
- Born: 24 May 1955 (age 71) Gori, Georgia
- Occupation: Judoka
- Height: 1.85 m (6 ft 1 in)

Sport
- Country: Soviet Union
- Sport: Judo
- Weight class: ‍–‍95 kg
- Club: Soviet Army Tbilisi

Achievements and titles
- Olympic Games: (silver) (1980)
- World Champ.: (1979, 1981)
- European Champ.: (gold) (1976, 1979)
Medal record
Men's judo
Representing Soviet Union
Olympic Games
Silver medal – second place	1980 Moscow	‍–‍95 kg
World Championships
Gold medal – first place	1979 Paris	‍–‍95 kg
Gold medal – first place	1981 Maastricht	‍–‍95 kg
European Championships
Gold medal – first place	1976 Kyiv	‍–‍93 kg
Gold medal – first place	1979 Brussels	‍–‍95 kg
Silver medal – second place	1981 Debrecen	‍–‍95 kg
World Juniors Championships
Bronze medal – third place	1974 Rio de Janeiro	+93 kg
European Junior Championships
Gold medal – first place	1975 Turku	‍–‍93 kg

Profile at external databases
- IJF: 1717
- JudoInside.com: 5826
- Updated on 20 June 2023

Tengiz Karamanovich Khubuluri (born 24 May 1955) is a Georgian retired half-heavyweight judoka. He won the world title in 1979 and 1981, the European title in 1976 and 1979, and finished second at the 1980 Olympic Games. In 1979 he was named Georgian Athlete of the Year.
