= Felice Mariani (judoka) =

Italian judoka

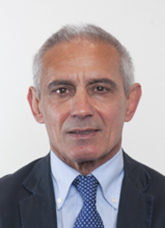
- Mariani in 2018

Personal information
- Born: 8 July 1954 (age 71) Rome, Italy
- Occupation: Judoka
- Height: 1.60 m (5 ft 3 in)

Sport
- Country: Italy
- Sport: Judo
- Weight class: ‍–‍60 kg, ‍–‍63 kg
- Club: Fiamme Gialle

Achievements and titles
- Olympic Games: (bronze) (1976)
- World Champ.: (bronze) (1975, 1979, 1981)
- European Champ.: (gold) (1978, 1979, 1980)
Medal record
Men's judo
Representing Italy
Olympic Games
Bronze medal – third place	1976 Montreal	‍–‍63 kg
World Championships
Bronze medal – third place	1975 Vienna	‍–‍63 kg
Bronze medal – third place	1979 Paris	‍–‍60 kg
Bronze medal – third place	1981 Maastricht	‍–‍60 kg
European Championships
Gold medal – first place	1978 Helsinki	‍–‍60 kg
Gold medal – first place	1979 Brussels	‍–‍60 kg
Gold medal – first place	1980 Vienna	‍–‍60 kg
Silver medal – second place	1984 Liege	‍–‍60 kg
European Junior Championships
Gold medal – first place	1974 Tel Aviv	‍–‍63 kg

Profile at external databases
- IJF: 667
- JudoInside.com: 5329
- Updated on 21 June 2023

Felice Mariani (born 8 July 1954) is an Italian politician and former judoka who competed in the 1976 Summer Olympics and in the 1984 Summer Olympics.
