= Detlef Ultsch =

East German judoka

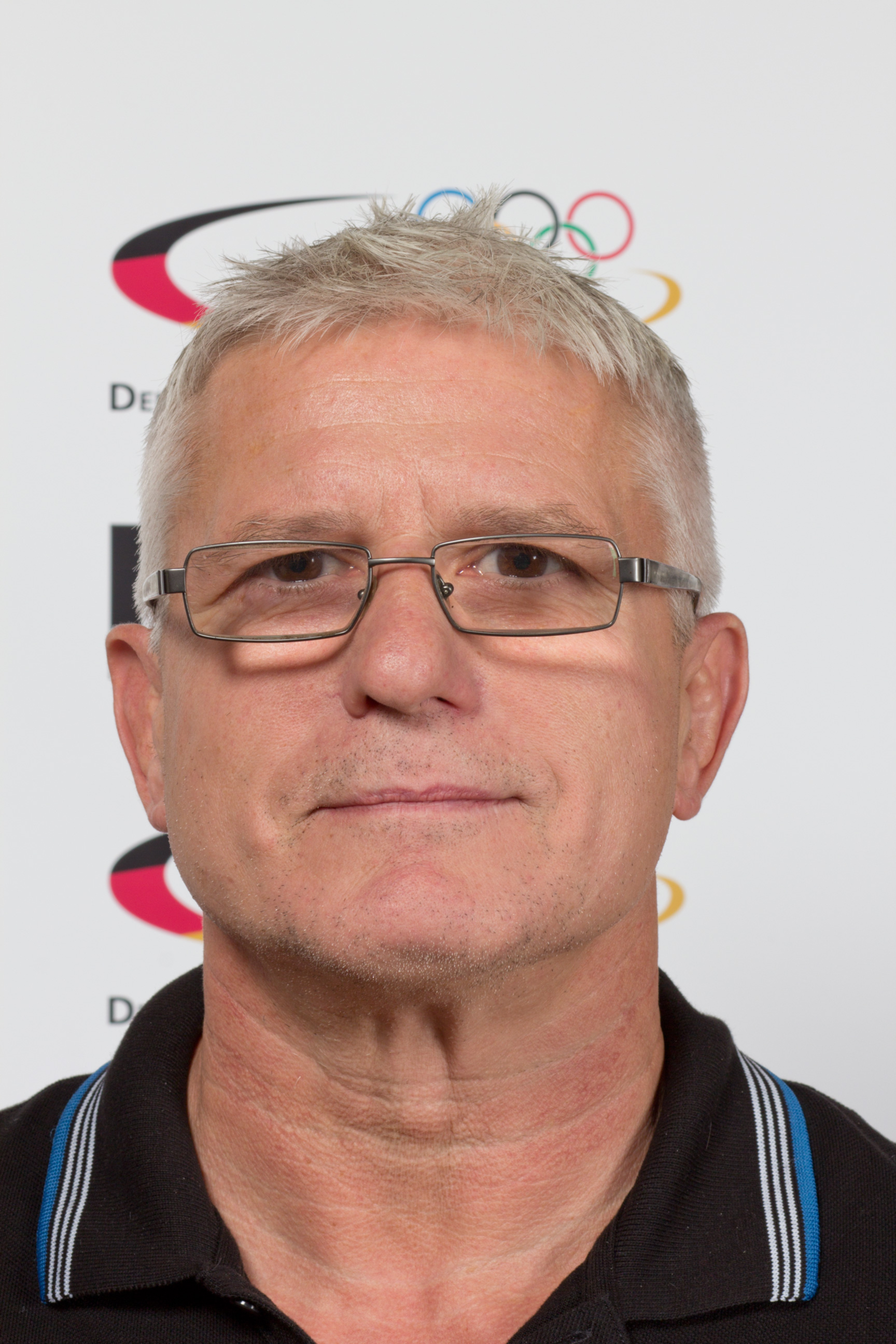
- Ultsch in 2012

Personal information
- Born: 7 November 1955 (age 70)
- Occupation: Judoka

Sport
- Country: East Germany
- Sport: Judo
- Weight class: ‍–‍86 kg

Achievements and titles
- Olympic Games: (bronze) (1980)
- World Champ.: (1979, 1983)
- European Champ.: (silver) (1978)
Medal record
Men's judo
Representing East Germany
Olympic Games
Bronze medal – third place	1980 Moscow	‍–‍86 kg
World Championships
Gold medal – first place	1979 Paris	‍–‍86 kg
Gold medal – first place	1983 Moscow	‍–‍86 kg
Bronze medal – third place	1981 Maastricht	‍–‍86 kg
European Championships
Silver medal – second place	1978 Helsinki	‍–‍86 kg
Bronze medal – third place	1976 Kyiv	‍–‍80 kg
Bronze medal – third place	1977 Ludwigshafen	‍–‍86 kg
Bronze medal – third place	1979 Brussels	‍–‍86 kg
Bronze medal – third place	1980 Vienna	‍–‍86 kg
Bronze medal – third place	1982 Rostock	‍–‍86 kg
Bronze medal – third place	1983 Paris	‍–‍86 kg

Profile at external databases
- IJF: 636
- JudoInside.com: 5636
- Updated on 20 June 2023

Detlef Ultsch (born 7 November 1955) is an East German former judoka.

Ultsch was born in Sonneberg, Bezirk Suhl. Ultsch is the first German judo world champion and became a double world middleweight champion, winning the title in Paris 1979 and Moscow 1983. He also competed at the 1976 Summer Olympics and the 1980 Summer Olympics.
