= Kaše =

Kaše is a Czech surname. Notable people with the surname include:

- Ondřej Kaše, Czech ice hockey player
- David Kaše, Czech ice hockey player
- Max Kase, American writer and newspaper editor

== See also ==
- Kase (disambiguation)
