= Franch Casadei =

Sammarinese judoka

Personal information
- Nationality: Sammarinese
- Born: 9 January 1958 (age 67)
- Occupation: Judoka

Sport
- Sport: Judo

Profile at external databases
- JudoInside.com: 13370

Franch Casadei (born 9 January 1958) is a Sammarinese judoka. He competed at the 1980, 1984 and the 1988 Summer Olympics.
