= Mihalache Toma =

Romanian judoka

Personal information
- Nationality: Romanian
- Born: 24 December 1955 (age 70) Iași, Romania

Sport
- Sport: Judo

Mihalache Toma (born 24 December 1955) is a Romanian judoka. He competed in the men's middleweight event at the 1980 Summer Olympics.
