= Slavko Obadov =

Serbian judoka (1948–2025)

Personal information
- Born: 12 July 1948 Zemun, PR Serbia, FPR Yugoslavia
- Died: 15 September 2025 (aged 77) Novi Sad, Vojvodina, Serbia
- Occupation: Judoka

Sport
- Country: Yugoslavia
- Sport: Judo
- Weight class: ‍–‍80 kg, ‍–‍86 kg

Achievements and titles
- Olympic Games: (bronze) (1976)
- World Champ.: 7th (1969)
- European Champ.: (silver) (1979)
Medal record
Men's judo
Representing Yugoslavia
Olympic Games
| Bronze medal – third place | 1976 Montreal | ‍–‍80 kg |
European Championships
| Silver medal – second place | 1979 Brussels | ‍–‍86 kg |
European Junior Championships
| Gold medal – first place | 1969 Berlin | ‍–‍70 kg |
| Bronze medal – third place | 1968 London | ‍–‍70 kg |
Men's sambo
World Championships
| Silver medal – second place | 1973 Tehran | ‍–‍82 kg |

Profile at external databases
- IJF: 54267
- JudoInside.com: 5537
- Updated on 15 september 2025

Slavko Obadov (Serbian: Славко Обадов; 12 July 1948 – 15 September 2025) was a Serbian judoka who competed in the 1972 Summer Olympics, in the 1976 Summer Olympics and in the 1980 Summer Olympics. Obadov died in Novi Sad on 15 September 2025, at the age of 77.
