= Karl-Heinz Lehmann =

East German judoka

Personal information
- Born: 2 January 1957 (age 69)
- Occupation: Judoka

Sport
- Country: East Germany
- Sport: Judo
- Weight class: ‍–‍71 kg

Achievements and titles
- Olympic Games: (bronze) (1980)
- World Champ.: (bronze) (1981)
- European Champ.: (gold) (1981)
Medal record
Men's judo
Representing East Germany
Olympic Games
| Bronze medal – third place | 1980 Moscow | ‍–‍71 kg |
World Championships
| Bronze medal – third place | 1981 Maastricht | ‍–‍71 kg |
European Championships
| Gold medal – first place | 1981 Debrecen | ‍–‍71 kg |
| Silver medal – second place | 1982 Rostock | ‍–‍71 kg |
| Bronze medal – third place | 1980 Vienna | ‍–‍71 kg |
| Bronze medal – third place | 1983 Paris | ‍–‍71 kg |
European Junior Championships
| Bronze medal – third place | 1975 Turku | ‍–‍70 kg |
| Bronze medal – third place | 1977 Berlin | ‍–‍71 kg |
Friendship Games
| Bronze medal – third place | 1984 Moscow | ‍–‍71 kg |

Profile at external databases
- IJF: 54230
- JudoInside.com: 5603
- Updated on 19 June 2023

Karl-Heinz Lehmann (born 2 January 1957) is a German former judoka who competed in the 1980 Summer Olympics.
