= Mahmoud Saad (judoka) =

Syrian judoka

Personal information
- Nationality: Syrian
- Born: 9 January 1958 (age 67)

Sport
- Sport: Judo

Mahmoud Saad (born 9 January 1958) is a Syrian judoka. He competed in the men's middleweight event at the 1980 Summer Olympics, where he came in tied for last at 19th.
