= Neil Adams (judoka) =

British judoka (born 1958)

Neil Adams MBE
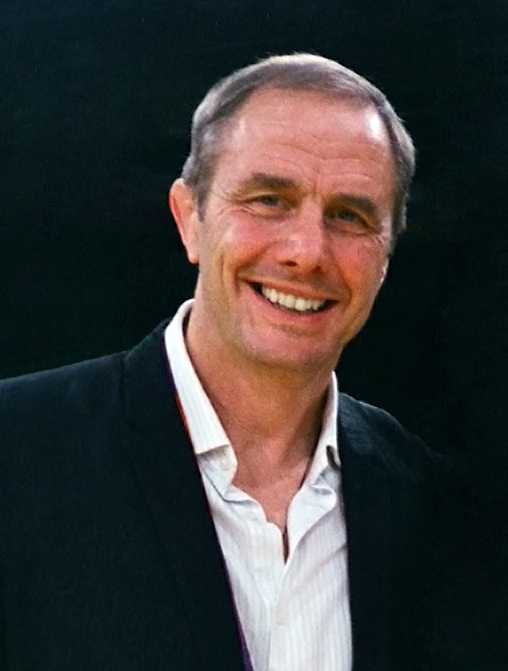
- Adams at the 2012 Summer Olympics.

Personal information
- Full name: Adrian Neil Adams
- Nationality: British (English)
- Born: 27 September 1958 (age 68) Rugby, Warwickshire, England
- Home town: Coventry, England
- Occupation: Judoka
- Height: 5 ft 10 in (178 cm)
- Weight: 12 st 3 lb (171 lb; 78 kg)
- Relative: Chris Adams (Brother)
- Website: www.neiladamsjudo.info

Sport
- Country: Great Britain
- Sport: Judo
- Weight class: –71 kg, –78 kg
- Rank: 9th dan black belt

Achievements and titles
- Olympic Games: (silver) (1980, 1984)
- World Champ.: (gold) (1981)
- European Champ.: (gold) (1979, 1980, 1983, 1984, 1985)
Medal record
Men's judo
Representing Great Britain
Olympic Games
Silver medal – second place	1980 Moscow	‍–‍71 kg
Silver medal – second place	1984 Los Angeles	‍–‍78 kg
World Championships
Gold medal – first place	1981 Maastricht	‍–‍78 kg
Silver medal – second place	1983 Moscow	‍–‍78 kg
Bronze medal – third place	1979 Paris	‍–‍71 kg
Bronze medal – third place	1985 Seoul	‍–‍78 kg
European Championships
Gold medal – first place	1979 Brussels	‍–‍71 kg
Gold medal – first place	1980 Vienna	‍–‍78 kg
Gold medal – first place	1983 Paris	‍–‍78 kg
Gold medal – first place	1984 Liege	‍–‍78 kg
Gold medal – first place	1985 Hamar	‍–‍78 kg
Bronze medal – third place	1977 Ludwigshafen	‍–‍71 kg
Bronze medal – third place	1978 Helsinki	‍–‍71 kg
Bronze medal – third place	1982 Rostock	‍–‍78 kg
World Juniors Championships
Bronze medal – third place	1976 Madrid	‍–‍70 kg
European Junior Championships
Gold medal – first place	1977 Berlin	‍–‍71 kg
Bronze medal – third place	1976 Lodz	‍–‍70 kg
European Cadet Championships
Gold medal – first place	1974 Tel Aviv	‍–‍58 kg
Bronze medal – third place	1975 Turku	‍–‍65 kg

Profile at external databases
- IJF: 335
- JudoInside.com: 4889
- Updated on 19 June 2023

Adrian Neil Adams, MBE (27 September 1958) is an English judoka who won numerous Olympic and World Championship medals in judo representing Great Britain. He was appointed Member of the Order of the British Empire (MBE) in the 1983 New Year Honours for services to judo.

== Early life ==
Adams was educated at Myton School in Warwick. Adams' brother was the late professional wrestling star Chris Adams, who himself had a successful career in judo before turning to pro wrestling in 1978.

== Judo competition career ==
Adams was the first British male to win a world title, and the first British male to simultaneously hold a world title and a European title. Other achievements include a gold medal at the 1981 World Championships in Maastricht, the Netherlands, plus silver medals in the 1980 and 1984 Summer Olympics and the 1983 World Championships. Adams was also five-time European Champion. He is also a two times champion of Great Britain, winning lightweight and half-middleweight divisions at the British Judo Championships in 1976 and 1988.

On 18 December 2018 he was promoted by the International Judo Federation to kudan - 9th Dan at the age of 60. He was presented with his certificate of grade (at the Paris Grand Slam tournament) on 10 February 2019 by the federation's president, Marius Vizer.

== Coaching career ==
Since retiring, Adams has run a coach education business called Neil Adams Effective Fighting, as well as teaching judo around the world.

He was national coach of VJF judo in Belgium. He then became head coach of the Welsh Judo Association, a position he took on after being asked to take up the role by close friend and chairman of the association Keven Williams, a position he resigned in March 2009.

== Personal life ==
Neil's brother Chris Adams grew up practising Judo alongside him, however, Chris did not pursue the sport as an adult and instead chose to enter professional wrestling.

In the 1980s Adams was engaged to British Olympic swimming star Sharron Davies.

Adams married Alison Walker of Burford, and together had a son but they divorced in 2000.

He met former Canadian Olympic judoka Niki Jenkins at the Sydney Olympic Games, and they married in 2002. The couple have two daughters, Brooke and Taylor, and live in Rugby.

Adams is a recovering alcoholic.

Adams' long time friend Jonathan Gavin died from a brain tumour on 5 February 2013 at the age of 46, Adams led the national sports community in mourning. In a widely published tribute, Adams said: “My dearest friend Josh has just lost the biggest fight of his life. Our thoughts and prayers are with his incredible family who never had a negative thought throughout his Illness. “Some people are born great and Josh Gavin was a warrior. He was also the funniest man I have ever met and I will never forget the incredible times we had together.”

== Bibliography ==
- (1986) "Olympic Judo: Throwing Techniques" Pelham (with Cyril Carter)
- (1986) "Olympic Judo: Variations on Groundwork" Pelham (with Cyril Carter)
- (1988) "Olympic Judo: Preparation and Training" Pelham (with Cyril Carter)
- (1991) "Tai-otoshi" Judo Masterclass Techniques Ippon Books
- (1991) "Arm Locks" Judo Masterclass Techniques Ippon Books
- (1991) "Grips" Judo Masterclass Techniques Ippon Books
- (2016) "A Game of Throws – celebrating 50 years in Judo" Fox Spirit Books

== In popular culture ==
Adams was so fondly regarded in Japan that he was given the nickname 'Happo Bigin' ('Everyone's Friend').

A canine version of Neil Adams made a 'guest appearance' in episode 44 of the online comic series Dog Judo.

On 2 December 1983, he was one of the guests on the UK children's programme Crackerjack together with Lynsey de Paul and Kim Wilde.

Adams was also a contestant on the BBC TV series The Adventure Game in 1983.

He is now a commentator for the IJF.

== See also ==
- Judo in the United Kingdom
