= Kostas Papakostas =

Cypriot judoka (born 1948)

Personal information
- Nationality: Cypriot
- Born: 2 October 1948 (age 76)
- Occupation: Judoka

Sport
- Sport: Judo

Kostas Papakostas (born 2 October 1948) is a Cypriot judoka. He competed at the 1980 Summer Olympics and the 1984 Summer Olympics.
