= Vladimír Kocman =

Czech judoka

Personal information
- Born: 5 April 1956 (age 70)
- Occupation: Judoka

Sport
- Country: Czechoslovakia
- Sport: Judo
- Weight class: +95 kg, Open

Achievements and titles
- Olympic Games: (bronze) (1980)
- World Champ.: (silver) (1983)
- European Champ.: (bronze) (1980, 1984)
Medal record
Men's judo
Representing Czechoslovakia
Olympic Games
Bronze medal – third place	1980 Moscow	+95 kg
World Championships
Silver medal – second place	1983 Moscow	Open
Bronze medal – third place	1981 Maastricht	+95 kg
European Championships
Bronze medal – third place	1980 Vienna	Open
Bronze medal – third place	1984 Liege	+95 kg
European Junior Championships
Bronze medal – third place	1976 Lodz	+93 kg
Friendship Games
Silver medal – second place	1984 Moscow	Open

Profile at external databases
- IJF: 54308
- JudoInside.com: 5832
- Updated on 20 June 2023

Vladimír Kocman (born 5 April 1956 in České Budějovice) is a Czech former judoka who competed in the 1980 Summer Olympics.
