= 1979 World Judo Championships =

Judo competition

Judo 1979 Men's World Judo Championships
- Venue: Stade Pierre de Coubertin
- Location: Paris, France
- Dates: 6–9 December 1979
- Competitors: 273 from 54 nations

Competition at external databases
- Links: IJF • JudoInside

The 1979 World Judo Championships were the 10th edition of the men's World Judo Championships, and were held in Paris, France from 6–9 December, 1979. The last tournament in 1977 had been cancelled.

== Medal overview ==
=== Men ===
Event	Gold	Silver	Bronze
-60 kg	(France) Thierry Rey	(South Korea) Gwak U-jong	(Italy) Felice Mariani (Japan) Yasuhiko Moriwaki
-65 kg	(Soviet Union) Nikolai Solodukhin	(France) Yves Delvingt	(Poland) Janusz Pawłowski (Japan) Kyosuke Sahara
-71 kg	(Japan) Kiyoto Katsuki	(Italy) Ezio Gamba	(United Kingdom) Neil Adams (Soviet Union) Tamaz Namgalauri
-78 kg	(Japan) Shozo Fujii	(France) Bernard Tchoullouyan	(East Germany) Harald Heinke (South Korea) Park Young-Chul
-86 kg	(East Germany) Detlef Ultsch	(France) Michel Sanchis	(Brazil) Walter Carmona (Japan) Masao Takahashi
-95 kg	(Soviet Union) Tengiz Khubuluri	(Belgium) Robert van de Walle	(Germany) Gunther Neureuther (Netherlands) Henk Numan
+95 kg	(Japan) Yasuhiro Yamashita	(France) Jean-Luc Rougé	(South Korea) Cho Jae-Ki (Hungary) Imre Varga
Open	(Japan) Sumio Endo	(Soviet Union) Vitali Kuznetsov	(Socialist Federal Republic of Yugoslavia) Radomir Kovacevic (France) Jean-Luc Rougé

=== Medal table ===
Rank	Nation	Gold	Silver	Bronze	Total
1	Japan (JPN)	4	0	3	7
2	Soviet Union (URS)	2	1	1	4
3	France (FRA)	1	4	1	6
4	East Germany (GDR)	1	0	1	2
5	South Korea (KOR)	0	1	2	3
6	Italy (ITA)	0	1	1	2
7	Belgium (BEL)	0	1	0	1
8	Brazil (BRA)	0	0	1	1
8	Great Britain (GBR)	0	0	1	1
8	Hungary (HUN)	0	0	1	1
8	Netherlands (NED)	0	0	1	1
8	Poland (POL)	0	0	1	1
8	West Germany (FRG)	0	0	1	1
8	Yugoslavia	0	0	1	1
Totals (14 entries)		8	8	16	32
