= Judo at the 1980 Summer Olympics =

Judo Judo at the Games of the XXII Olympiad
- Venue: Palace of Sports of the Central Lenin Stadium
- Location: Moscow, Soviet Union
- Dates: 27 July – 2 August 1980
- Competitors: 182 from 42 nations

Competition at external databases
- Links: IJF • JudoInside

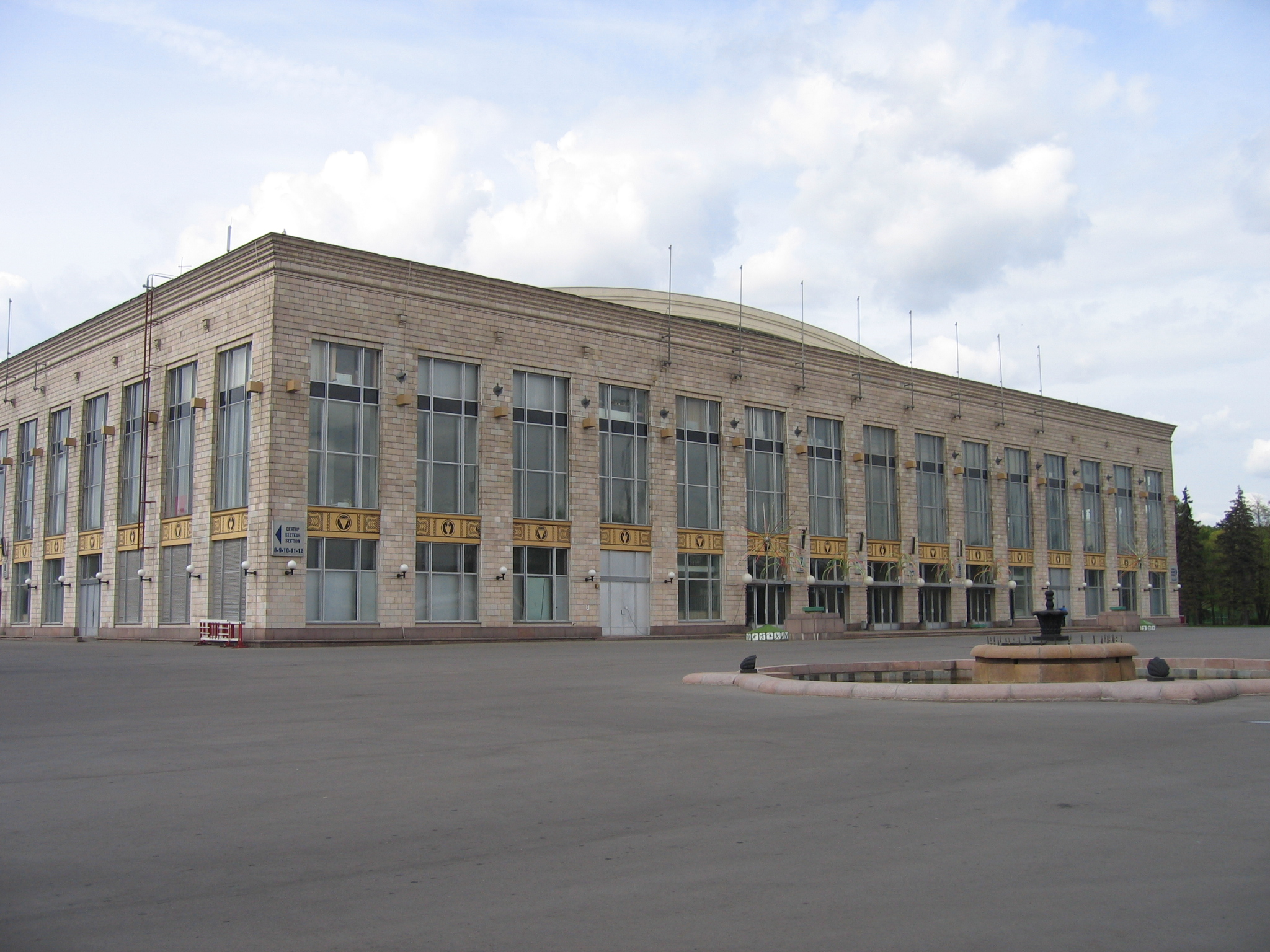
Palace of Sports of the Central Lenin Stadium as it appears today

The Judo competition at the 1980 Summer Olympics was the first time that the medal count was not dominated by Japan, since the country joined the boycott of the games because of the 1979 Soviet invasion of Afghanistan. Medals were awarded to male judoka in eight competitions, seven weight classes and the open competition — two more than in 1976. All events were held at the Palace of Sports of the Central Lenin Stadium at Luzhniki (south western part of Moscow). The schedule started on July 27 and ended on August 2.

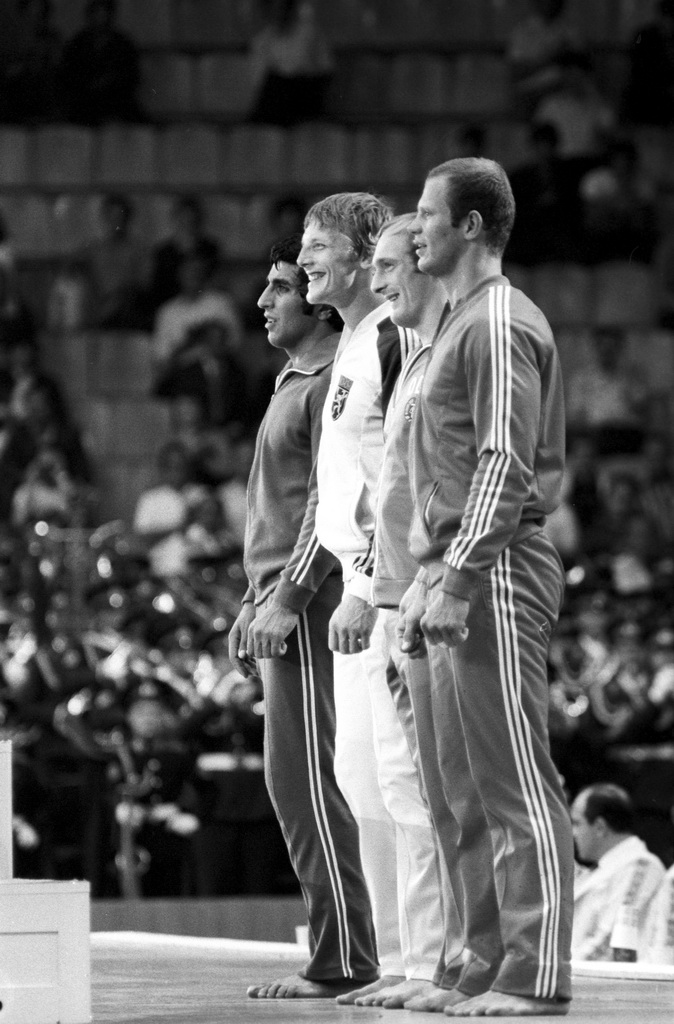
Victory ceremony of the 95 kg event. RIAN photo.

== Medal summary ==
Games	Gold	Silver	Bronze
Extra Lightweight; 60 kg	Thierry Rey; France	Jose Rodriguez; Cuba	Aramby Emizh; Soviet Union Tibor Kincses; Hungary
Half Lightweight; 65 kg	Nikolai Solodukhin; Soviet Union	Tsendiin Damdin; Mongolia	Ilian Nedkov; Bulgaria Janusz Pawłowski; Poland
Lightweight; 71 kg	Ezio Gamba; Italy	Neil Adams; Great Britain	Ravdangiin Davaadalai; Mongolia Karl-Heinz Lehmann; East Germany
Half Middleweight; 78 kg	Shota Khabareli; Soviet Union	Juan Ferrer; Cuba	Harald Heinke; East Germany Bernard Tchoullouyan; France
Middleweight; 86 kg	Jürg Röthlisberger; Switzerland	Isaac Azcuy; Cuba	Detlef Ultsch; East Germany Aleksandrs Jackevičs; Soviet Union
Half-Heavyweight; 95 kg	Robert Van de Walle; Belgium	Tengiz Khubuluri; Soviet Union	Dietmar Lorenz; East Germany Henk Numan; Netherlands
Heavyweight +95 kg	Angelo Parisi; France	Dimitar Zaprianov; Bulgaria	Radomir Kovačević; Yugoslavia Vladimír Kocman; Czechoslovakia
Open category	Dietmar Lorenz; East Germany	Angelo Parisi; France	Arthur Mapp; Great Britain András Ozsvár; Hungary

== Participating nations ==
A total of 182 judokas from 42 nations competed at the Moscow Games

- Algeria (3)
- Australia (3)
- Austria (5)
- Belgium (1)
- Brazil (7)
- Bulgaria (4)
- Cameroon (5)
- Costa Rica (3)
- Cuba (6)
- Cyprus (5)

- East Germany (6)
- Finland (3)
- France (7)
- Great Britain (8)
- Guinea (3)
- Hungary (8)
- Ireland (2)
- Iceland (2)
- Italy (1)

- Kuwait (5)
- Lebanon (2)
- Madagascar (2)
- Mexico (2)
- Mongolia (8)
- Ecuador (2)
- Spain (2)
- Mali (3)
- Netherlands (2)
- Poland (7)

- Portugal (3)
- North Korea (4)
- Romania (8)
- Senegal (7)
- San Marino (2)
- Switzerland (4)
- Sweden (4)
- Syria (7)
- Czechoslovakia (5)

- Soviet Union (8)
- Yugoslavia (6)
- Zambia (6)
- Zimbabwe (2)

== Medal table ==
Rank	Nation	Gold	Silver	Bronze	Total
1	Soviet Union	2	1	2	5
2	France	2	1	1	4
3	East Germany	1	0	4	5
4	Belgium	1	0	0	1
4	Italy	1	0	0	1
4	Switzerland	1	0	0	1
7	Cuba	0	3	0	3
8	Bulgaria	0	1	1	2
8	Great Britain	0	1	1	2
8	Mongolia	0	1	1	2
11	Hungary	0	0	2	2
12	Czechoslovakia	0	0	1	1
12	Netherlands	0	0	1	1
12	Poland	0	0	1	1
12	Yugoslavia	0	0	1	1
Totals (15 entries)		8	8	16	32
