= 1976 European Judo Championships =

1976 Judo European Judo Championships
- Location: Kyiv, Soviet Union
- Dates: 6–9 May 1976

Competition at external databases
- Links: JudoInside

The 1976 European Judo Championships were the 25th edition of the European Judo Championships, and were held in Kyiv, Soviet Union from 6 to 9 May 1976. Championships were subdivided into six individual competitions, and a separate team competition.

== Medal overview ==
Event	Gold	Silver	Bronze
63 kg	(Hungary) József Tuncsik	(Soviet Union) Oleg Zurabiani	(France) Michel Algisi (France) Yves Delvingt
70 kg	(Soviet Union) Valery Dvoinikov	(East Germany) Dietmar Hötger	(Poland) Marian Talaj (Soviet Union) Aristotel Spirov
80 kg	(France) Jean-Paul Coche	(Poland) Adam Adamczyk	(Poland) Antoni Reiter (East Germany) Detlef Ultsch
93 kg	(Soviet Union) Tengiz Khubuluri	(Belgium) Robert Van De Walle	(West Germany) Arthur Schnabel (Socialist Federal Republic of Yugoslavia) Goran Zuvela
93+ kg	(Soviet Union) Sergey Novikov	(Soviet Union) Givi Onashvili	(Socialist Federal Republic of Yugoslavia) Momir Lucic (Hungary) Mihály Petrovszky
Open class	(Soviet Union) Avel Kazachenkov	(Czechoslovakia) Vladimir Novak	(Socialist Federal Republic of Yugoslavia) Radomir Kovacevic (Soviet Union) Dzhibilo Nizharadze

=== Medal table ===
Rank	Nation	Gold	Silver	Bronze	Total
1	Soviet Union (URS)	4	2	2	8
2	France (FRA)	1	0	2	3
3	Hungary (HUN)	1	0	1	2
4	Poland (POL)	0	1	2	3
5	East Germany (DDR)	0	1	1	2
6	Belgium (BEL)	0	1	0	1
6	Czechoslovakia (TCH)	0	1	0	1
8	Yugoslavia (YUG)	0	0	3	3
9	West Germany (FRG)	0	0	1	1
Totals (9 entries)		6	6	12	24

== Results overview ==
=== 63 kg ===
Position	Judoka	Country
1.	József Tuncsik	Hungary
2.	Oleg Zurabiani	Soviet Union
3.	Michel Algisi	France
3.	Yves Delvingt	France
5.	Konstantin Alexander	Great Britain
5.	Raymond Neenan	Great Britain

=== 70 kg ===
Position	Judoka	Country
1.	Valery Dvoinikov	Soviet Union
2.	Dietmar Hoetger	East Germany
3.	Marian Talaj	Poland
3.	Aristotel Spirov	Soviet Union
5.	Patrick Vial	France
5.	Jiri Dolejs	Czechoslovakia

=== 80 kg ===
Position	Judoka	Country
1.	Jean-Paul Coche	France
2.	Adam Adamczyk	Poland
3.	Antoni Reiter	Poland
3.	Detlef Ultsch	East Germany
5.	Raimund Hargesheimer	West Germany
5.	Mihalache Toma	Romania

=== 93 kg ===
Position	Judoka	Country
1.	Tengiz Khubuluri	Soviet Union
2.	Robert Van De Walle	Belgium
3.	Arthur Schnabel	West Germany
3.	Goran Zuvela	Yugoslavia
5.	Paul Radburn	Great Britain
5.	Johan Schåltz	Sweden

=== 93+ kg ===
Position	Judoka	Country
1.	Sergey Novikov	Soviet Union
2.	Givi Onashvili	Soviet Union
3.	Momir Lucic	Yugoslavia
3.	Mihály Petrovszky	Hungary
5.	Markku Airio	Finland
5.	Vladimir Novak	Czechoslovakia

=== Open class ===
Position	Judoka	Country
1.	Avel Kazachenkov	Soviet Union
2.	Vladimir Novak	Czechoslovakia
3.	Radomir Kovacevic	Yugoslavia
3.	Dzhibilo Nizharadze	Soviet Union
5.	Rainer Kohl	East Germany
5.	Waldemar Zausz	Poland

=== Teams ===
Event	Gold	Silver	Bronze
Team	(France) French team: Yves Delvingt; Patrick Vial; Jean-Pierre Tripet; Jean-Paul Coche; Rémi Berthet	(Soviet Union) Soviet team: Gennady Ivshin; Valery Dvoinikov; Alexey Volosov; Ramaz Kharshiladze; Shota Chochishvili	(East Germany) East German team: Torsten Reissmann; Andre Gerdes; Detlef Ultsch; Rainer Kohl; Wolfgang Zueckschwerdt
