= 1977 European Judo Championships =

1977 Judo European Judo Championships
- Location: Ludwigshafen, West Germany
- Dates: 11–15 May 1977

Competition at external databases
- Links: JudoInside

The 1977 European Judo Championships were the 26th edition of the European Judo Championships, and were held in Ludwigshafen, West Germany from 11 to 15 May 1977. Championships were subdivided into eight individual competitions, and a separate team competition. The separate European Women's Judo Championships were held in Arlon, Belgium, in October of the same year.

== Medal overview ==
=== Individual ===
Event	Gold	Silver	Bronze
60 kg	(Soviet Union) Evgeny Pogorelov	(France) Guy Le Baupin	(Romania) Arpad Szabo (East Germany) Reinhardt Arndt
65 kg	(France) Yves Delvingt	(Hungary) Ferenc Szabó	(East Germany) Torsten Reißmann (Sweden) Wolfgang Biedron
71 kg	(Soviet Union) Vladimir Nevzorov	(Poland) Marian Talaj	(United Kingdom) Neil Adams (East Germany) Günter Krüger
78 kg	(Poland) Adam Adamczyk	(East Germany) Harald Heinke	(West Germany) Fred Marhenke (France) Bernard Choullouyan
86 kg	(Soviet Union) Alexey Volosov	(Switzerland) Jürgen Roethlisberger	(Poland) Zbigniew Bielawski (East Germany) Detlef Ultsch
95 kg	(East Germany) Dietmar Lorenz	(Belgium) Robert Van De Walle	(West Germany) Arthur Schnabel (United Kingdom) Paul Radburn
95+ kg	(France) Jean-Luc Rougé	(Soviet Union) Dzhibilo Nizharadze	(Netherlands) Peter Adelaar (East Germany) Wolfgang Zueckschwerdt
Open class	(France) Angelo Parisi	(East Germany) Wolfgang Zueckschwerdt	(Belgium) Robert Van De Walle (Soviet Union) Shota Chochishvili

=== Teams ===
Event	Gold	Silver	Bronze
Team	(Soviet Union) Soviet team: Evgeny Pogorelov; Amiran Obgaidze; Vladimir Nevzorov; Dilar Khabuliani; Alexey Volosov; Tengiz Khubuluri; Dzhibilo Nizharadze; Oleg Zurabiani; Valery Dvoinikov; Shota Chochishvili	(France) French team: Alain Veret; Yves Delvingt; Patrick Vial; Jean-Pierre Gibert; Gérard Decherchi; Jean-Luc Rougé; Roger Hairabedian; Bernard Tchoullouyan	(East Germany) East German team: (Romania) Romanian team:

=== Medal table ===
Rank	Nation	Gold	Silver	Bronze	Total
1	France (FRA)	3	1	1	5
1	Soviet Union (URS)	3	1	1	5
3	East Germany (DDR)	1	2	5	8
4	Poland (POL)	1	1	1	3
5	Belgium (BEL)	0	1	1	2
6	Hungary (HUN)	0	1	0	1
6	Switzerland (SUI)	0	1	0	1
8	Great Britain (GBR)	0	0	2	2
8	West Germany (FRG)	0	0	2	2
10	Netherlands (NED)	0	0	1	1
10	Romania (ROM)	0	0	1	1
10	Sweden (SWE)	0	0	1	1
Totals (12 entries)		8	8	16	32
