= 1975 European Judo Championships =

1975 Judo European Judo Championships
- Location: Lyon, France
- Dates: 8–9 May 1975

Competition at external databases
- Links: JudoInside

The 1975 European Judo Championships were the 24th edition of the European Judo Championships, and were held in Lyon, France, from 8 to 9 May 1975. Championships were subdivided into six individual competitions, and a separate team competition.

== Medal overview ==
=== Individual ===
Event	Gold	Silver	Bronze
63 kg	(East Germany) Torsten Reißmann	(Soviet Union) Shengeli Pitskhelauri	(France) Yves Delvingt (Poland) Edward Alksnin
70 kg	(Soviet Union) Vladimir Nevzorov	(Soviet Union) Valeriy Dvoynikov	(East Germany) Dietmar Hoetger (East Germany) Günther Krueger
80 kg	(Poland) Antoni Reiter	(Soviet Union) Abdulgadzhi Barkalaev	(Poland) Adam Adamczyk (Soviet Union) Alexey Volosov
93 kg	(East Germany) Dietmar Lorenz	(France) Jean-Luc Rougé	(United Kingdom) David Starbrook (Soviet Union) Amiran Muzaev
93+ kg	(Soviet Union) Dzhibilo Nizharadze	(Soviet Union) Sergey Novikov	(East Germany) Wolfgang Zueckschwerdt (Czechoslovakia) Vladimír Novák
Open class	(Soviet Union) Givi Onashvili	(Soviet Union) Shota Chochishvili	(Netherlands) Peter Adelaar (East Germany) Wolfgang Zueckschwerdt

=== Teams ===
Event	Gold	Silver	Bronze
Team	(Soviet Union) Soviet team: Shengeli Pitskhelauri; Valeriy Dvoynikov; Abdulgadzhi Barkalaev; Ramaz Kharshiladze; Sergey Novikov	(France) French team: Yves Delvingt; Michel Algisi; Gérard Gautier; Jean-Paul Coche; Jean-Luc Rougé; Rémi Berthet	(Poland) Polish team: Edward Alksnin; Antoni Zajkowski; Adam Adamczyk; Wlodzimierz Lewin; Zbigniew Bielawski (Socialist Federal Republic of Yugoslavia) Yugoslav team: Janez Vidmajer; Milan Mijalković; Slavko Obadov; Goran Zuvela; Momir Lučić

=== Medal table ===
Rank	Nation	Gold	Silver	Bronze	Total
1	Soviet Union	3	5	2	10
2	East Germany	2	0	4	6
3	Poland	1	0	2	3
4	France	0	1	1	2
5	Czechoslovakia	0	0	1	1
5	Great Britain	0	0	1	1
5	Netherlands	0	0	1	1
Totals (7 entries)		6	6	12	24
