= Judo at the 1980 Summer Olympics – Men's open category =

Judo competition

Men's Open at the Games of the XXII Olympiad
- Venue: Palace of Sports of the Central Lenin Stadium
- Date: August 2, 1980
- Competitors: 18 from 18 nations

Medalists
1st place, gold medalist(s)		Dietmar Lorenz	East Germany
2nd place, silver medalist(s)		Angelo Parisi	France
3rd place, bronze medalist(s)		Arthur Mapp	Great Britain
3rd place, bronze medalist(s)		András Ozsvár	Hungary

Men's Open category competition in Judo at the 1980 Summer Olympics in Moscow, Soviet Union was held at Palace of Sports of the Central Lenin Stadium. The gold medal was won by Dietmar Lorenz from East Germany.

== Results ==
=== Pool A ===
Round of 32
Walter Carmona (BRA)	5:00
Jaakko Saari (FIN)	E
Dimitar Zapryanov (BUL)
Bye
Arthur Mapp (GBR)	2:08
Peter Adelaar (NED)	E
John de Wet (ZIM)
Bye
Pavel Drăgoi (ROM)	0:00
Jean Zinneker (SUI)	wo
Dietmar Lorenz (GDR)
Bye
Dambajavyn Tsend–Ayuush (MGL)
Bye
Abdoulaye Kote (SEN)
Bye

Round of 16
Dimitar Zapryanov (BUL)	5:00
Walter Carmona (BRA)	E
Arthur Mapp (GBR)	1:43
John de Wet (ZIM)	E
Dietmar Lorenz (GDR)	0:57
Pavel Drăgoi (ROM)	R
Dambajavyn Tsend–Ayuush (MGL)	5:00
Abdoulaye Kote (SEN)	E

Quarterfinal
Arthur Mapp (GBR)	5:00
Dimitar Zapryanov (BUL)	E
Dietmar Lorenz (GDR)	2:32
Dambajavyn Tsend–Ayuush (MGL)	R

Semifinal
Dietmar Lorenz (GDR)	0:39
Arthur Mapp (GBR)	R

=== Pool B ===
Round of 32
Sergei Novikov (URS)	4:45
Kim Myong Gyu (PRK)	R
Ulf Ekberg (SWE)
Bye
Franz Berger (AUT)
Bye
Said Akhtar (SYR)
Bye
András Ozsvár (HUN)	5:00
Wojciech Reszko (POL)	E
Robert Van de Walle (BEL)
Bye
Radomir Kovačević (YUG)
Bye
Angelo Parisi (FRA)
Bye

Round of 16
Sergei Novikov (URS)	0:00
Ulf Ekberg (SWE)	wo
Franz Berger (AUT)	1:05
Said Akhtar (SYR)	E
András Ozsvár (HUN)	5:00
Robert Van de Walle (BEL)	E
Angelo Parisi (FRA)	0:00
Radomir Kovačević (YUG)	wo

Quarterfinal
Sergei Novikov (URS)	3:51
Franz Berger (AUT)	E
Angelo Parisi (FRA)	5:00
András Ozsvár (HUN)	R

Semifinal
Angelo Parisi (FRA)	3:13
Sergei Novikov (URS)	R

=== Repechages ===
Repechage	Repechage semifinal		Repechage final
	Dambajavyn Tsend–Ayuush (MGL)	2:16
	Pavel Drăgoi (ROM)	E
			Arthur Mapp (GBR)	2:50 (bronze)
			Dambajavyn Tsend–Ayuush (MGL)

Repechage	Repechage semifinal	Repechage final
		András Ozsvár (HUN)	7:00 (bronze)
		Sergei Novikov (URS)

=== Final ===
Final
Dietmar Lorenz (GDR)	7:00 (gold)
Angelo Parisi (FRA)	2nd place, silver medalist(s)
