= Judo at the 1976 Summer Olympics – Men's +93 kg =

Judo competition

Men's +93 kg at the Games of the XXI Olympiad
- Venue: Olympic Velodrome
- Date: 26 July 1976
- Competitors: 19 from 19 nations

Medalists
1st place, gold medalist(s)		Serhiy Novikov	Soviet Union
2nd place, silver medalist(s)		Günther Neureuther	West Germany
3rd place, bronze medalist(s)		Sumio Endo	Japan
3rd place, bronze medalist(s)		Allen Coage	United States

The men's +93 kg competition in judo at the 1976 Summer Olympics in Montreal was held on 26 July at the Olympic Velodrome. The gold medal was won by Serhiy Novikov of the Soviet Union.

== Results ==
=== Main brackets ===
==== Pool A ====
Round of 32
Serhiy Novikov (URS)	W
Sumio Endo (JPN)	L
Keith Remfry (GBR)	W
Waldemar Zausz (POL)	L

Round of 16
Serhiy Novikov (URS)	W
Pak Jong-gil (PRK)	L
Radomir Kovacevic (YUG)	W
José Chandri (PUR)	L
Keith Remfry (GBR)	W
Emil Petrunov (BUL)	L
Rémi Berthet (FRA)	L
Mihály Petrovszky (HUN)	W

Quarterfinal
Serhiy Novikov (URS)	W
Radomir Kovacevic (YUG)	L
Keith Remfry (GBR)	W
Mihály Petrovszky (HUN)	L

Semifinal
Serhiy Novikov (URS)	W
Keith Remfry (GBR)	L

==== Pool B ====
Round of 32
Abdoulaye Kote (SEN)	W
Hans-Jakob Schädler (LIE)	L

Round of 16
Abdoulaye Kote (SEN)	L
Günther Neureuther (FRG)	W
Mario Daminelli (ITA)	DNS
Güsemiin Jalaa (MGL)	WO
Vladimír Novák (TCH)	L
Klaus Wallas (AUT)	W
Allen Coage (USA)	W
Jaime Felipa (AHO)	L

Quarterfinal
Günther Neureuther (FRG)	W
Güsemiin Jalaa (MGL)	L
Klaus Wallas (AUT)	L
Allen Coage (USA)	W

Semifinal
Günther Neureuther (FRG)	W
Allen Coage (USA)	L

=== Repechages ===
==== Repechage A ====
Repechage		Repechage semifinal		Repechage final
Sumio Endo (JPN)	W
Pak Jong-gil (PRK)	L	Sumio Endo (JPN)	W
		Radomir Kovacevic (YUG)	L
				Sumio Endo (JPN)	W
				Keith Remfry (GBR)	L

==== Repechage B ====
Repechage	Repechage semifinal		Repechage final
	Abdoulaye Kote (SEN)	L
	Güsemiin Jalaa (MGL)	W
			Güsemiin Jalaa (MGL)	L
			Allen Coage (USA)	W

=== Finals ===
Semi-finals
Serhiy Novikov (URS)	W
Keith Remfry (GBR)	L
Günther Neureuther (FRG)	W
Allen Coage (USA)	L

Final
Serhiy Novikov (URS)	W
Günther Neureuther (FRG)	L

== Final classification ==
Rank	Name	Country
1st place, gold medalist(s)	Serhiy Novikov	Soviet Union
2nd place, silver medalist(s)	Günther Neureuther	West Germany
3rd place, bronze medalist(s)	Sumio Endo	Japan
3rd place, bronze medalist(s)	Allen Coage	United States
5	Güsemiin Jalaa	Mongolia
5	Keith Remfry	Great Britain
7	Abdoulaye Kote	Senegal
7	Radomir Kovacevic	Yugoslavia
9	Pak Jong-gil	North Korea
10	Klaus Wallas	Austria
10	Mihály Petrovszky	Hungary
12	Jaime Felipa	Netherlands Antilles
12	José Chandri	Puerto Rico
12	Emil Petrunov	Bulgaria
12	Rémi Berthet	France
12	Vladimír Novák	Czechoslovakia
17	Hans-Jakob Schädler	Liechtenstein
17	Waldemar Zausz	Poland
17	Markku Airio	Finland
