= Judo at the 1976 Summer Olympics – Men's 70 kg =

Judo competition

Men's 70 kg at the Games of the XXI Olympiad
- Venue: Olympic Velodrome
- Date: 29 July 1976
- Competitors: 27 from 27 nations

Medalists
1st place, gold medalist(s)		Vladimir Nevzorov	Soviet Union
2nd place, silver medalist(s)		Koji Kuramoto	Japan
3rd place, bronze medalist(s)		Patrick Vial	France
3rd place, bronze medalist(s)		Marian Tałaj	Poland

The men's 70 kg competition in judo at the 1976 Summer Olympics in Montreal was held on 29 July at the Olympic Velodrome.

The competition included two single-elimination pools, with winner of each pool advancing to the final. All judoka losing to the winner of each pool advanced to repêchage pools, with the winners of the repêchage pools earning bronze medals.

== Results ==
=== Finals ===
Semi-finals
Koji Kuramoto (JPN)	W
Patrick Vial (FRA)	L
Vladimir Nevzorov (URS)	W
Lee Chang-sun (KOR)	L

Final
Koji Kuramoto (JPN)	L
Vladimir Nevzorov (URS)	W

=== Repechages ===
Repechage		Repechage semifinal		Repechage final
Juan Carlos Rodríguez (ESP)	W
António Roquete (POR)	L	Juan Carlos Rodríguez (ESP)	L
		Vacinuff Morrison (GBR)	W
				Vacinuff Morrison (GBR)	L
				Patrick Vial (FRA)	W

Repechage		Repechage semifinal		Repechage final
Marian Tałaj (POL)	W
Thomas Hagmann (SUI)	L	Marian Tałaj (POL)	W
		John Van Hoek (AUS)	L
				Marian Tałaj (POL)	W
				Lee Chang-sun (KOR)	L

=== Pool A ===
Round of 32
Bye
Georgi Georgiev (BUL)
Fahad Al-Farhan (KUW)	L
Vacinuff Morrison (GBR)	W
António Roquete (POR)	L
Koji Kuramoto (JPN)	W
Rafet Güngör (TUR)	L
Juan Carlos Rodríguez (ESP)	W
Shagdaryn Chanrav (MGL)	WO
Du Yong Cha (PRK)
Károly Molnár (HUN)	L
Dietmar Hötger (GDR)	W
Pat Burris (USA)	W
Carlos Miranda (PUR)	L
Bye
Patrick Vial (FRA)

Round of 16
Georgi Georgiev (BUL)	L
Vacinuff Morrison (GBR)	W
Koji Kuramoto (JPN)	W
Juan Carlos Rodríguez (ESP)	L
Shagdaryn Chanrav (MGL)	L
Dietmar Hötger (GDR)	W
Pat Burris (USA)	L
Patrick Vial (FRA)	W

Quarterfinal
Vacinuff Morrison (GBR)	L
Koji Kuramoto (JPN)	W
Dietmar Hötger (GDR)	L
Patrick Vial (FRA)	W

Semifinal
Koji Kuramoto (JPN)	W
Patrick Vial (FRA)	L

=== Pool B ===
Round of 32
Cheuk Wing Mok (HKG)	L
John Van Hoek (AUS)	W
Bye
Lamine Wade (SEN)
Vladimir Nevzorov (URS)	W
Marian Tałaj (POL)	L
Thomas Hagmann (SUI)
Bye
Wayne Erdman (CAN)	L
Lee Chang-seon (KOR)	W
Roberto Zuasnabar Machusso (BRA)	W
Yonah Melnik (ISR)	L
Oscar Strático (ARG)	W
Jhonny MacKay (ECU)	L
Ezio Gamba (ITA)
Bye

Round of 16
John Van Hoek (AUS)	W
Lanine Wade (SEN)	L
Vladimir Nevzorov (URS)	W
Thomas Hagmann (SUI)	L
Lee Chang-sun (KOR)	W
Roberto Zuasnabar Machusso (BRA)	L
Oscar Strático (ARG)	L
Ezio Gamba (ITA)	W

Quarterfinal
John Van Hoek (AUS)	L
Vladimir Nevzorov (URS)	W
Lee Chang-sun (KOR)	W
Ezio Gamba (ITA)	L

Semifinal
Vladimir Nevzorov (URS)	W
Lee Chang-sun (KOR)	L
