= 1980 European Judo Championships =

1980 Judo European Judo Championships
- Location: Vienna, Austria
- Dates: 15–18 May 1980

Competition at external databases
- Links: JudoInside

The 1980 European Judo Championships were the 3rd edition of the European Judo Championships, and were held in Vienna, Austria from 15 to 18 May 1980.

== Medal overview ==
=== Men ===
Event	Gold	Silver	Bronze
60 kg	(Italy) Felice Mariani	(Austria) Josef Reiter	(France) Thierry Rey (East Germany) Reinhard Arndt
65 kg	(East Germany) Torsten Reißmann	(Soviet Union) Valentin Tarakanov	(Hungary) Imre Gelencsér (Romania) Constantin Niculae
71 kg	(Romania) Nicolae Vlad	(United Kingdom) Chris Bowles	(East Germany) Karl-Heinz Lehmann (Soviet Union) Evgeny Babanov
78 kg	(United Kingdom) Neil Adams	(East Germany) Harald Heinke	(France) Bernard Choullouyan (Romania) Mircea Fratica
86 kg	(Soviet Union) Alexander Yatskevich	(Austria) Peter Seisenbacher	(United Kingdom) Peter Donnelly (East Germany) Detlef Ultsch
95 kg	(France) Jean-Luc Rougé	(East Germany) Dietmar Lorenz	(Belgium) Robert Van De Walle (Soviet Union) Ramaz Kharshiladze
95+ kg	(Soviet Union) Aleksey Tyurin	(Hungary) Imre Varga	(Netherlands) Peter Adelaar (France) Angelo Parisi
Open class	(Belgium) Robert Van De Walle	(France) Angelo Parisi	(Czechoslovakia) Vladimir Kocman (Soviet Union) Sergey Novikov

=== Medal table ===
Rank	Nation	Gold	Silver	Bronze	Total
1	Soviet Union (URS)	2	1	3	6
2	East Germany (GDR)	1	2	3	6
3	France (FRA)	1	1	3	5
4	Great Britain (GBR)	1	1	1	3
5	Romania (ROU)	1	0	2	3
6	Belgium (BEL)	1	0	1	2
7	Italy (ITA)	1	0	0	1
8	Austria (AUT)	0	2	0	2
9	Hungary (HUN)	0	1	1	2
10	Czechoslovakia (TCH)	0	0	1	1
10	Netherlands (NED)	0	0	1	1
Totals (11 entries)		8	8	16	32

== Results overview ==
=== Men ===
==== 60 kg ====
Position	Judoka	Country
1.	Felice Mariani	Italy
2.	Josef Reiter	Austria
3.	Thierry Rey	France
3.	Reinhard Arndt	East Germany
5.	Marian Donat	Poland
5.	Arpad Szabó	Romania

==== 65 kg ====
Position	Judoka	Country
1.	Torsten Reißmann	East Germany
2.	Valentin Tarakanov	Soviet Union
3.	Imre Gelencser	Hungary
3.	Constantin Niculae	Romania
5.	Janusz Pawlowski	Poland
5.	Yves Delvingt	France

==== 71 kg ====
Position	Judoka	Country
1.	Nicolae Vlad	Romania
2.	Chris Bowles	Great Britain
3.	Karl-Heinz Lehmann	East Germany
3.	Evgeny Babanov	Soviet Union
5.	Károly Molnar	Hungary
5.	Erich Lehmann	Switzerland

==== 78 kg ====
Position	Judoka	Country
1.	Neil Adams	Great Britain
2.	Harald Heinke	East Germany
3.	Bernard Choullouyan	France
3.	Mircea Fratica	Romania
5.	Adalbert Missalla	West Germany
5.	Vladimír Bárta	Czechoslovakia

==== 86 kg ====
Position	Judoka	Country
1.	Alexander Yatskevich	Latvia
2.	Peter Seisenbacher	Austria
3.	Peter Donnelly	Great Britain
3.	Detlef Ultsch	East Germany
5.	Slavko Sikiric	Croatia
5.	Jose Antonio Cechini	Spain

==== 95 kg ====
Position	Judoka	Country
1.	Jean-Luc Rougé	France
2.	Dietmar Lorenz	East Germany
3.	Robert Van De Walle	Belgium
3.	Ramaz Kharshiladze	Soviet Union
5.	Daniel Radu	Romania
5.	Jaroslav Nikodym	Czechoslovakia

==== 95+ kg ====
Position	Judoka	Country
1.	Alexey Tyurin	Soviet Union
2.	Imre Varga	Hungary
3.	Peter Adelaar	Netherlands
3.	Angelo Parisi	France
5.	Vladimir Kocman	Czechoslovakia
5.	Markku Airio	Finland

==== Open class ====
Position	Judoka	Country
1.	Robert Van De Walle	Belgium
2.	Angelo Parisi	France
3.	Vladimir Kocman	Czechoslovakia
3.	Sergey Novikov	Soviet Union
5.	Clemens Jehle	Switzerland
