= Michinori Ishibashi =

Japanese judoka (born 1952)

Personal information
- Born: 1 January 1952 (age 74)
- Occupation: Judoka

Sport
- Country: Japan
- Sport: Judo
- Weight class: -93 kg

Achievements and titles
- World Champ.: (silver) (1975)
Medal record
Representing Japan
Men's judo
World Championships
Silver medal – second place	1975 Vienna	-93 kg

Profile at external databases
- JudoInside.com: 5385

Michinori Ishibashi (石橋道紀, Ishibashi Michinori; born 01 January 1952) is a Japanese judoka.

== Biography ==
Michinori Ishibashi was born on January 1, 1952. He is a graduate of Nihon University. He qualified to compete at the 1975 Judo World Championships by winning gold at the All Japan weight limit national championships in September 1975 in Fukuoka.

In October 1975, he won silver in the -94 kg division at the Judo World Championships in Vienna by fighting Jean-Luc Rougé in the finals, Ramaz Kharshiladze in the semifinals, Peter Donnelly in the quarterfinals, and defeating the latter two competitors.

In April 1978, Ishibashi hailing from Fort Worth, won gold in the Open division at the US National Judo Championships in Chicago.
