= 1974 European Judo Championships =

1974 Judo European Judo Championships
- Location: London, United Kingdom
- Dates: 2–5 May 1974

Competition at external databases
- Links: JudoInside

The 1974 European Judo Championships were the 23rd edition of the European Judo Championships, and were held in London, United Kingdom from 2 to 5 May 1974. Championships were subdivided into six individual competitions, and a separate team competition.

== Medal overview ==
=== Individual ===
Event	Gold	Silver	Bronze
63 kg	(Soviet Union) Sergey Melnichenko	(United Kingdom) Danny Da Costa	(France) Michel Algisi (Soviet Union) Shengeli Pitskhelauri
70 kg	(East Germany) Günter Krüger	(Soviet Union) Valery Dvoinikov	(West Germany) Engelbert Dörbandt (France) Gérard Gautier
80 kg	(France) Jean-Paul Coche	(Poland) Antoni Reiter	(Poland) Adam Adamczyk (United Kingdom) Bob Debelius
93 kg	(Socialist Federal Republic of Yugoslavia) Goran Zuvela	(West Germany) Günther Neureuther	(United Kingdom) David Starbrook (East Germany) Dietmar Lorenz
93+ kg	(Soviet Union) Givi Onashvili	(Netherlands) Chris Dolman	(France) Rémi Berthet (East Germany) Wolfgang Zueckschwerdt
Open class	(Soviet Union) Sergey Novikov	(Soviet Union) Shota Chochishvili	(Hungary) Imre Varga (East Germany) Wolfgang Zueckschwerdt

=== Teams ===
Event	Gold	Silver	Bronze
Team	(Soviet Union) Soviet team: Sergey Melnichenko; Valeriy Dvoynikov; Andrey Tsyupachenko; Amiran Muzayev; Sergey Novikov	(United Kingdom) British team: Constantine Alexander; Vas Morrison; Brian Jacks; Keith Remfry	(West Germany) West German team: Alexander Leibkind; Fred Marhenke; Günther Neureuther; Engelbert Dörbandt; Karl Beilfuß (East Germany) East German team: Karl-Heinz Werner; Günter Krüger; Dietmar Lorenz; Wolfgang Zuckschwerdt

=== Medal table ===
Rank	Nation	Gold	Silver	Bronze	Total
1	Soviet Union	3	2	1	6
2	East Germany	1	0	3	4
2	France	1	0	3	4
4	Yugoslavia	1	0	0	1
5	Great Britain	0	1	2	3
6	Poland	0	1	1	2
6	West Germany	0	1	1	2
8	Netherlands	0	1	0	1
9	Hungary	0	0	1	1
Totals (9 entries)		6	6	12	24
