= Arthur Mapp =

British judoka (born 1953)

Personal information
- Nationality: British (English)
- Born: 6 November 1953 (age 72) British Honduras
- Occupation: Judoka

Sport
- Country: Great Britain
- Sport: Judo
- Weight class: +95 kg, Open

Achievements and titles
- Olympic Games: (bronze) (1980)
- World Champ.: R16 (1979)
- European Champ.: R16 (1979)
Medal record
Men's judo
Representing Great Britain
Olympic Games
Bronze medal – third place	1980 Moscow	Open

Profile at external databases
- IJF: 54332
- JudoInside.com: 4963
- Updated on 20 June 2023

Arthur Mapp (born 6 November 1953) is a British former judoka who won bronze in Judo at the 1980 Summer Olympics.

== Biography ==
Mapp, born in British Honduras came to prominence after winning the 1978 Swedish Open and 1978 British Open. In 1980, he was selected to represent Great Britain at the 1980 Olympic Games in Moscow, where he competed in the men's open category. He reached the semi-finals before losing to the eventual gold medallist Dietmar Lorenz but Mapp won the repechage final against Dambajavyn Tsend–Ayuush to claim a bronze medal. At the time of his Olympic success, Arthur Mapp was serving with the British Army as a Corporal in the Royal Army Pay Corps.

In 1981, he became champion of Great Britain, winning the open division at the British Judo Championships.

Also in 1981, he competed in the TV sports-show Superstars, excelling particularly at cricket.
