= Yona Melnik =

Israeli judoka (born 1949)

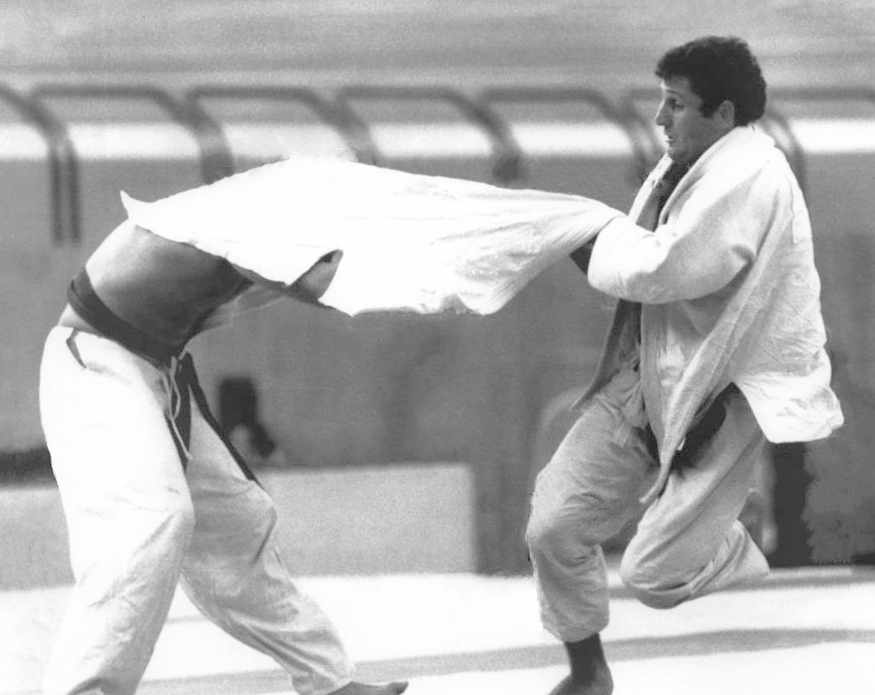
- Melnik (right) with Roberto Machusso at the 1976 Olympics.

Personal information
- Native name: יונה מלניק
- Born: 27 May 1949 (age 77) Kassel, West Germany
- Occupation: Judoka
- Height: 173 cm (5 ft 8 in)

Sport
- Country: Israel
- Sport: Judo
- Weight class: –70 kg
- Rank: 9th dan black belt

Achievements and titles
- Olympic Games: R32 (1976)
- World Champ.: R16 (1975)
- European Champ.: R32 (1973)

Profile at external databases
- IJF: 54372
- JudoInside.com: 20069
- Updated on 21 January 2025

Yona Melnik (Hebrew: יונה מלניק; born 27 May 1949) is an Israeli former judoka and current coach. He holds a 9th dan black belt.

== Biography ==
Melnik is Jewish, and was born in Kassel, West Germany. He won the Israeli national championship in judo 12 times between 1968 and 1980 in the welterweight (below 70 kilograms) category, and twice in the open division. He won gold medals in judo at the 1969 Maccabiah Games and at the 1973 Maccabiah Games. He competed for Israel at the 1976 Summer Olympics in Montréal, Québec, in the half-middleweight category, and tied for 19th place.

Melnik subsequently coached the Israeli judo team, and opened a dojo in Petah Tikvah. He co-authored an April 2006 article in Strength & Conditioning Journal titled "The Ten-Station Judo Ability Test: A Test of Physical and Skill Components."
