= Shagdaryn =

Shagdaryn is a Mongolian surname. Notable people with the name include:

- Shagdaryn Bira (1927–2002), Mongolian historian
- Shagdaryn Chanrav (1948–2007), Mongolian judoka
- Shagdaryn Dulmaa (1934–2024), Mongolian poet and journalist
