= Judo at the 1980 Summer Olympics – Men's 65 kg =

Judo competition

Men's 65kg at the Games of the XXII Olympiad
- Venue: Palace of Sports of the Central Lenin Stadium
- Date: July 31
- Competitors: 29 from 29 nations

Medalists
1st place, gold medalist(s)		Nikolai Solodukhin	Soviet Union
2nd place, silver medalist(s)		Tsendiin Damdin	Mongolia
3rd place, bronze medalist(s)		Iliyan Nedkov	Bulgaria
3rd place, bronze medalist(s)		Janusz Pawłowski	Poland

Men's 65 kg competition in Judo at the 1980 Summer Olympics in Moscow, Soviet Union was held at Palace of Sports of the Central Lenin Stadium. The gold medal was won by Nikolai Solodukhin of the Soviet Union.

== Results ==
=== Pool A ===
Round of 32
José António Branco (POR)	1:32
Abdoulaye Thera (MLI)	E
Iliyan Nedkov (BUL)	1:47
Jimmy Arévalo (ECU)	E
Jaroslav Kříž (TCH)	1:59
Alvaro Sanabria (CRC)	E
Nikolai Solodukhin (URS)	2:39
Héctor Rodríguez (CUB)	R
Raymond Neenan (GBR)	2:12
Franc Očko (YUG)	E
Sylvain Rabary (MAD)	5:00
Konstantinos Konstantinou (CYP)	E
Michael Young (AUS)	2:57
Francis Mwahza (ZAM)	E
Torsten Reissmann (GDR)
BYE

Round of 16
Iliyan Nedkov (BUL)	2:31
José António Branco (POR)	E
Nikolai Solodukhin (URS)	5:00
Jaroslav Kříž (TCH)	R
Raymond Neenan (GBR)	2:43
Sylvain Rabary (MAD)	E
Torsten Reissmann (GDR)	5:00
Michael Young (AUS)	E

Quarterfinal
Nikolai Solodukhin (URS)	5:00
Iliyan Nedkov (BUL)	R
Torsten Reissmann (GDR)	5:00
Raymond Neenan (GBR)	E

Semifinal
Nikolai Solodukhin (URS)	4:45
Torsten Reissmann (GDR)	R

=== Pool B ===
Round of 32
Wolfgang Biedron (SWE)	0:23
Redwan El-Zaouiki (SYR)	E
Luiz Onmura (BRA)	5:00
Constantin Niculae (ROM)	E
Tsendiin Damdin (MGL)	1:35
Daniel Francois Fyfer (ZIM)	R
Yves Delvingt (FRA)
BYE
Janusz Pawłowski (POL)	5:00
Imre Gelencsér (HUN)	E
Gerardo Padilla (MEX)	5:00
Abdul Latif Rozaihan (KUW)	E
Djibril Sambou (SEN)	5:00
Gerard Tom-Tam (CMR)	E
Mamadou Diallo (GUI)
BYE

Round of 16
Wolfgang Biedron (SWE)	2:15
Luiz Onmura (BRA)	R
Tsendiin Damdin (MGL)	5:00
Yves Delvingt (FRA)	R
Janusz Pawłowski (POL)	5:00
Gerardo Padilla (MEX)	E
Djibril Sambou (SEN)	2:26
Mamadou Diallo (GUI)	E

Quarterfinal
Tsendiin Damdin (MGL)	5:00
Wolfgang Biedron (SWE)	R
Janusz Pawłowski (POL)	3:10
Djibril Sambou (SEN)	E

Semifinal
Tsendiin Damdin (MGL)	5:00
Janusz Pawłowski (POL)	R

=== Repechages ===
Repechage		Repechage semifinal		Repechage final
Jaroslav Kříž (TCH)	5:00
Héctor Rodríguez (CUB)	E	Iliyan Nedkov (BUL)	5:00
		Jaroslav Kříž (TCH)	E
				Iliyan Nedkov (BUL)	7:00 (bronze)
				Torsten Reissmann (GDR)

Repechage		Repechage semifinal		Repechage final
Yves Delvingt (FRA)	1:30
Daniel Francois Fyfer (ZIM)	E	Yves Delvingt (FRA)	5:00
		Wolfgang Biedron (SWE)	E
				Janusz Pawłowski (POL)	4:26 (bronze)
				Yves Delvingt (FRA)

=== Final ===
Final
Nikolai Solodukhin (URS)	7:00 (gold)
Tsendiin Damdin (MGL)	2nd place, silver medalist(s)
