= Valeriy Dvoynikov =

Ukrainian judoka (born 1950)

Personal information
- Full name: Valeriy Vasylovych Dvoynikov
- Born: 4 May 1950 (age 76) Ozersk
- Occupation: Judoka
- Height: 170 cm (5 ft 7 in)

Sport
- Country: Soviet Union
- Sport: Judo
- Weight class: ‍–‍70 kg, ‍–‍80 kg

Achievements and titles
- Olympic Games: (silver) (1976)
- World Champ.: (silver) (1975)
- European Champ.: (gold) (1976)
Medal record
Men's judo
Representing Soviet Union
Olympic Games
Silver medal – second place	1976 Montreal	‍–‍80 kg
World Championships
Silver medal – second place	1975 Vienna	‍–‍70 kg
European Championships
Gold medal – first place	1976 Kyiv	‍–‍70 kg
Silver medal – second place	1974 London	‍–‍70 kg
Silver medal – second place	1975 Lyon	‍–‍70 kg
Bronze medal – third place	1971 Göteborg	‍–‍70 kg
European Junior Championships
Gold medal – first place	1970 Bordeaux	‍–‍70 kg

Profile at external databases
- IJF: 27273
- JudoInside.com: 5784
- Updated on 21 June 2023

Valeriy Vasylovych Dvoynikov (Ukrainian: Валерій Васильович Двойников, born 4 May 1950 in Ozersk) is a Ukrainian judoka who competed for the Soviet Union at the 1976 Summer Olympics, winning the silver medal in the middleweight division.

Dvoynikov was vice world champion in Vienna 1975 and European champion in Kyiv 1976.

Isao Inokuma said that "Among the foreign judoists with brilliant shin-gi-tai (spirit, skill, and power) are the Soviet Union's Vladimir Nevzorov, the victor in the light-middleweight class in the Montreal Olympics, Dvoinikov of the Soviet Union, who was runner-up in the middleweight division at the same Olympics, and Dietmar Lorenz of East Germany, who won the 95-kilograms-and-under class in the Jigoro Kano Cup International Judo Tournament held in Tokyo in 1978".

Dvoynikov is a co-founder in 2016 with his son, a politologue and poet Valery Dvoinikov, of Peter the Great's International Foundation working for the cultural reconciliation between Europe and Russia.
