= Judo at the 1980 Summer Olympics – Men's 71 kg =

Judo competition

Men's 71kg at the Games of the XXII Olympiad
- Venue: Palace of Sports of the Central Lenin Stadium
- Date: July 30, 1980
- Competitors: 30 from 30 nations

Medalists
1st place, gold medalist(s)		Ezio Gamba	Italy
2nd place, silver medalist(s)		Neil Adams	Great Britain
3rd place, bronze medalist(s)		Ravdangiin Davaadalai	Mongolia
3rd place, bronze medalist(s)		Karl-Heinz Lehmann	East Germany

Men's 71 kg competition in Judo at the 1980 Summer Olympics in Moscow, Soviet Union was held at Palace of Sports of the Central Lenin Stadium. The gold medal won by Ezio Gamba from Italy.

== Results ==
=== Pool A ===
Round of 32
Alonzo Henderson (IRL)
Bye
Niokhor Dionge (SEN)	1:33
Roukoz Roukoz (LIB)	E
Seppo Myllylä (FIN)	3:14
Cornel Roman (ROM)	E
Karl-Heinz Lehmann (GDR)	5:00
Johann Leo (AUT)	E
Halldór Guðbjörnsson (ISL)	0:46
Paul Diop (MLI)	E
Edward Alkśnin (POL)	4:35
Anelson Vieira (BRA)	E
Maurice Nkandem (CMR)	3:17
George Hamaiko (ZAM)	E
Neil Adams (GBR)	1:13
Michael Picken (AUS)	R

Round of 16
Niokhor Dionge (SEN)	5:00
Alonzo Henderson (IRL)	E
Karl-Heinz Lehmann (GDR)	5:00
Seppo Myllylä (FIN)	E
Edward Alkśnin (POL)	2:37
Halldor Gudbjörnsson (ISL)	E
Neil Adams (GBR)	00:00
Maurice Nkandem (CMR)	R

Quarterfinal
Karl-Heinz Lehmann (GDR)	0:25
Niokhor Dionge (SEN)	E
Neil Adams (GBR)	1:39
Edward Alkśnin (POL)	R

Semifinal
Neil Adams (GBR)	1:04
Karl-Heinz Lehmann (GDR)	R

=== Pool B ===
Round of 32
Ravdangiin Davaadalai (MGL)	1:15
Abdoulaye Diallo (GUI)	E
Tamaz Namgalauri (URS)	1:07
Manuel Chavez (CRC)	E
Ronny Nilsson (SWE)	1:43
Neofitos Aresti (CYP)	E
Ricardo Tuero (CUB)	5:00
Issam Tombakji (SYR)	E
Ezio Gamba (ITA)	0:22
Fahad Al-Farhan (KUW)	R
Christian Dyot (FRA)	5:00
Vojislav Vujević (YUG)	E
Kim Byong-gun (PRK)	5:00
Djillali Ben Brahim (ALG)	E
Károly Molnár (HUN)
Bye

Round of 16
Ravdangiin Davaadalai (MGL)	5:00
Tamaz Namgalauri (URS)	E
Ricardo Tuero (CUB)	3:14
Ronny Nilsson (SWE)	E
Ezio Gamba (ITA)	5:00
Christian Dyot (FRA)	R
Kim Byong-Gun (PRK)	5:00
Károly Molnár (HUN)	E

Quarterfinal
Ravdangiin Davaadalai (MGL)	3:11
Ricardo Tuero (CUB)	E
Ezio Gamba (ITA)	1:20
Kim Byong-Gun (PRK)	R

Semifinal
Ezio Gamba (ITA)	3:11
Ravdangiin Davaadalai (MGL)	R

=== Repechages ===
Repechage		Repechage semifinal		Repechage final
Michael Picken (AUS)	0:00
Maurice Nkandem (CMR)	E	Edward Alkśnin (POL)	5:00
		Michael Picken (AUS)	E
				Karl-Heinz Lehmann (GDR)	7:00 (bronze)
				Edward Alkśnin (POL)

Repechage		Repechage semifinal		Repechage final
Christian Dyot (FRA)	1:43
Fahad Al-Farhan (KUW)	E	Christian Dyot (FRA)	5:00
		Kim Byong-Gun (PRK)	E
				Ravdangiin Davaadalai (MGL)	7:00 (bronze)
				Christian Dyot (FRA)

=== Final ===
Final
Ezio Gamba (ITA)	7:00 (gold)
Neil Adams (GBR)	2nd place, silver medalist(s)
