= Kashiwazaki =

Kashiwazaki may refer to:

- Kashiwazaki, Niigata, a city in Japan
- Katsuhiko Kashiwazaki (born 1951), Japanese judoka
