= Roukoz =

Roukoz is a surname. Notable people with the surname include:

- Chamel Roukoz (born 1962), Lebanese brigadier general
- Roukoz Roukoz, Lebanese judoka
