= Franz Berger =

Franz Berger may refer to:

- Franz Berger (judoka) (born 1958), Austrian judoka
- Franz Berger (officer) (1916–1942), German officer in the Wehrmacht during World War II
- Franz Berger (wrestler) (1940–2012), Austrian wrestler
