= Biedron =

Biedron is a surname of Polish language origin. Notable people with the surname include:

- Robert Biedroń (born 1976), Polish LGBT activist and politician
- Sandra G. Biedron (born 1973), American-European physicist
- Wolfgang Biedron (born 1951), Swedish judoka

== See also ==
- Biedronka
