= Drăgoi =

Drăgoi is a Romanian surname. Notable people with the surname include:

- Cristian Drăgoi (born 1982), Romanian footballer
- Gabriela Drăgoi (born 1992), Romanian artistic gymnast
- Pavel Drăgoi (born 1956), Romanian judoka
- Sabin Drăgoi (1894–1968), Romanian composer

== See also ==
- Drăgan (disambiguation)
