= Georgi Georgiev (judoka, born 1947) =

Bulgarian judoka

Personal information
- Native name: Георги Георгиев
- Born: 3 August 1947 (age 77)
- Occupation: Judoka

Sport
- Country: Bulgaria
- Sport: Judo
- Weight class: ‍–‍70 kg

Achievements and titles
- Olympic Games: R16 (1976)

Profile at external databases
- IJF: 54357

Georgi Georgiev (Bulgarian: Георги Георгиев; born 3 August 1947) is a Bulgarian judoka. He competed in the men's half-middleweight event at the 1976 Summer Olympics. He finished thirteenth in the event.
