= Petrunov =

Petrunov is a Bulgarian-language surname. Notable people with the surname include:

- Emil Petrunov
- Hristo Petrunov (1859–1939), Bulgarian general
- Kiril Petrunov
