= Marian Tałaj =

Polish judoka (born 1950)

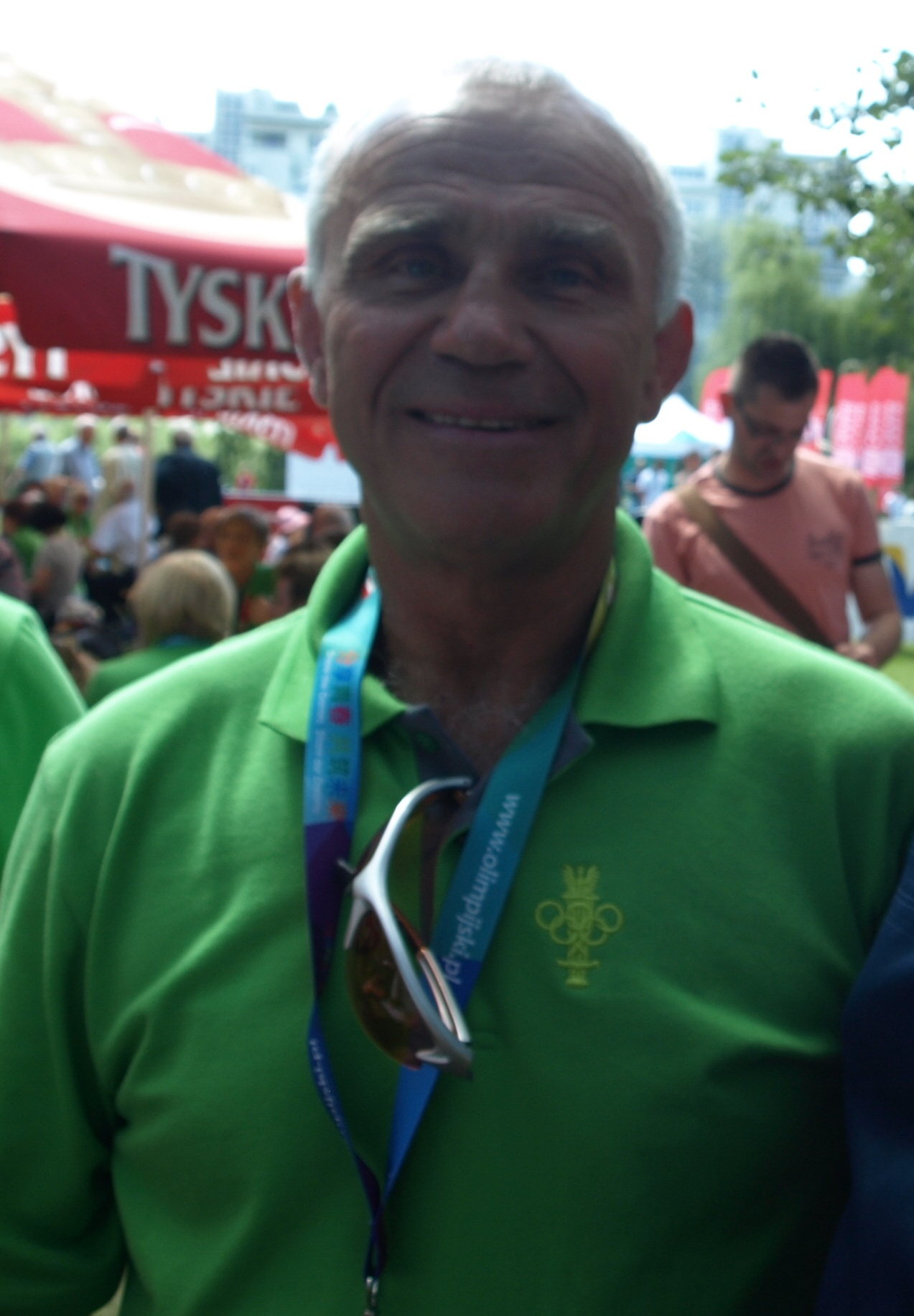

Personal information
- Born: 22 December 1950 (age 75)
- Occupation: Judoka

Sport
- Country: Poland
- Sport: Judo
- Weight class: ‍–‍70 kg

Achievements and titles
- Olympic Games: (bronze) (1976)
- World Champ.: 5th (1975)
- European Champ.: (silver) (1977)
Medal record
Men's judo
Representing Poland
Olympic Games
Bronze medal – third place	1976 Montreal	‍–‍70 kg
European Championships
Silver medal – second place	1977 Ludwigshafen	‍–‍71 kg
Bronze medal – third place	1972 Voorburg	‍–‍70 kg
Bronze medal – third place	1976 Kyiv	‍–‍70 kg
European Junior Championships
Bronze medal – third place	1970 Bordeaux	‍–‍63 kg
European Cadet Championships
Gold medal – first place	1968 London	‍–‍58 kg

Profile at external databases
- IJF: 4146
- JudoInside.com: 1171
- Updated on 21 June 2023

Marian Tałaj (born 22 December 1950 in Koszalin) is a Polish former judoka who competed in the 1972 Summer Olympics and in the 1976 Summer Olympics.
