= Fahad Al-Farhan =

Fahad Al-Farhan may refer to:

- Fahad Al-Farhan (handballer) (born 1995), Saudi Arabian handballer
- Fahad Al-Farhan (judoka) (born 1955), Kuwaiti judoka
