= Ravdangiin Davaadalai =

Mongolian judoka (born 1954)

Personal information
- Born: 20 March 1954 (age 72)
- Occupation: Judoka

Sport
- Country: Mongolia
- Sport: Judo
- Weight class: ‍–‍71 kg

Achievements and titles
- Olympic Games: (bronze) (1980)
- World Champ.: 5th (1981)
Medal record
Men's judo
Representing Mongolia
Olympic Games
Bronze medal – third place	1980 Moscow	‍–‍71 kg

Profile at external databases
- IJF: 48113
- JudoInside.com: 5560
- Updated on 19 June 2023

Ravdangiin Davaadalai (Mongolian: Равдангийн Даваадалай; born 20 March 1954) is a Mongolian retired judoka. At the 1980 Summer Olympics he won a bronze medal in the men's Lightweight (‍–‍71 kg) category.
