= Sylvain Rabary =

Malagasy judoka

Personal information
- Nationality: Malagasy
- Born: 29 August 1961 (age 63)

Sport
- Sport: Judo

Sylvain Rabary (born 29 August 1961) is a Malagasy judoka. He competed in the men's half-lightweight event at the 1980 Summer Olympics.
