= Adam Adamczyk =

Polish judoka (born 1950)

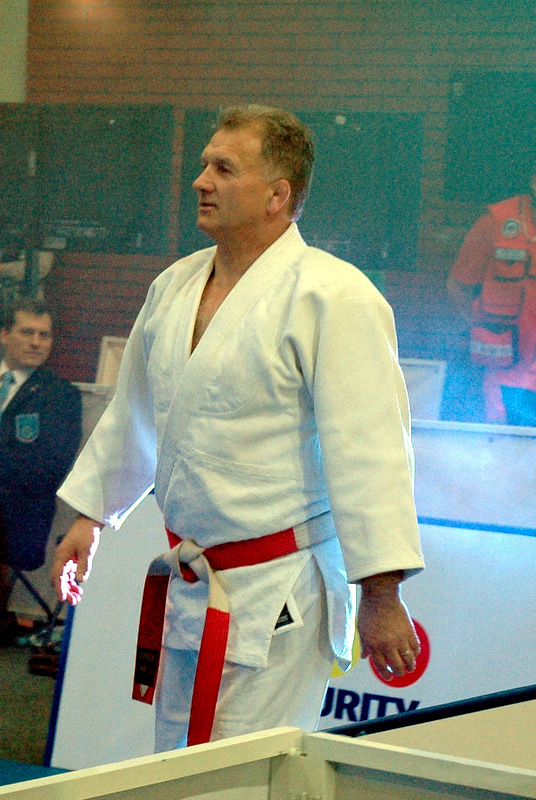
- Adam Adamczyk in 2012

Personal information
- Born: 1 October 1950 (age 75) Warsaw, Poland
- Occupation: Judoka
- Height: 1.73 m (5 ft 8 in)

Sport
- Country: Poland
- Sport: Judo
- Weight class: ‍–‍78 kg, ‍–‍80 kg

Achievements and titles
- Olympic Games: R16 (1976)
- World Champ.: (bronze) (1975)
- European Champ.: (gold) (1977)
Medal record
Men's judo
Representing Poland
World Championships
Bronze medal – third place	1975 Vienna	‍–‍80 kg
European Championships
Gold medal – first place	1977 Ludwigshafen	‍–‍78 kg
Silver medal – second place	1976 Kyiv	‍–‍80 kg
Silver medal – second place	1978 Helsinki	‍–‍78 kg
Bronze medal – third place	1974 London	‍–‍80 kg
Bronze medal – third place	1975 Lyon	‍–‍80 kg
Bronze medal – third place	1979 Brussels	‍–‍78 kg
Summer Universiade
Bronze medal – third place	1974 Brussels	Open

Profile at external databases
- IJF: 54379
- JudoInside.com: 1080
- Updated on 18 May 2025

Adam Eucharyst Adamczyk (born 1 October 1950) is a Polish judoka. He competed in the 1972 and 1976 Summer Olympics.
