= Juan Carlos Rodríguez (judoka) =

Spanish judoka

Personal information
- Nationality: Spanish
- Born: 2 February 1956 (age 69); Las Palmas, Spain

Sport
- Sport: Judo

Juan Carlos Rodríguez (born 2 February 1956) is a Spanish judoka. He competed in the men's half-middleweight event at the 1976 Summer Olympics.
