= José Chandri =

Puerto Rican judoka

Personal information
- Nationality: Puerto Rican
- Born: 12 May 1947 (age 77)

Sport
- Sport: Judo

José Chandri (born 12 May 1947) is a Puerto Rican judoka. He competed in the men's heavyweight event at the 1976 Summer Olympics.
