= Carlos Miranda (judoka) =

Puerto Rican judoka (born 1954)

Personal information
- Nationality: Puerto Rican
- Born: 12 November 1954 (age 71)

Sport
- Sport: Judo

Carlos Miranda (born 12 November 1954) is a Puerto Rican judoka. He competed in the men's half-middleweight event at the 1976 Summer Olympics.
