= Ronny Nilsson =

Swedish judoka

Personal information
- Nationality: Swedish
- Born: 23 June 1953 (age 71); Helsingborg, Sweden

Sport
- Sport: Judo

Ronny Nilsson (born 23 June 1953) is a Swedish judoka. He competed in the men's lightweight event at the 1980 Summer Olympics.
