= Djillali Ben Brahim =

Algerian judoka (1953–2021)

Personal information
- Nationality: Algerian
- Born: 1 June 1953; Boumerdès, Algeria
- Died: 28 June 2021 (aged 68)

Sport
- Sport: Judo

Djillali Ben Brahim (1 June 1953 – 28 June 2021) was an Algerian judoka. He competed in the men's lightweight event at the 1980 Summer Olympics.
