= Johann Leo =

Austrian judoka

Personal information
- Nationality: Austrian
- Born: 1 March 1958 (age 67); Kufstein, Austria
- Occupation: Judoka

Sport
- Sport: Judo

Profile at external databases
- JudoInside.com: 9806

Johann Leo (born 1 March 1958) is an Austrian judoka. He competed in the men's lightweight event at the 1980 Summer Olympics.
