= Ricardo Tuero =

Cuban judoka (born 1959)

Personal information
- Nationality: Cuban
- Born: 25 May 1959 (age 66)

Sport
- Sport: Judo

Ricardo Tuero (born 25 May 1959) is a Cuban judoka. He competed in the men's lightweight event at the 1980 Summer Olympics.
