= Lamine Wade =

Senegalese judoka (born 1943)

Personal information
- Nationality: Senegalese
- Born: 31 July 1943 (age 82)

Sport
- Sport: Judo

Lamine Wade (born 31 July 1943) is a Senegalese judoka. He competed in the men's half-middleweight event at the 1976 Summer Olympics.
