= Christian Dyot =

French judoka

Personal information
- Nationality: French
- Born: 24 February 1959 (age 66)

Sport
- Sport: Judo

Christian Dyot (born 24 February 1959) is a French judoka. He competed in the men's lightweight event at the 1980 Summer Olympics.
