= Djibril Sambou =

Senegalese judoka

Personal information
- Nationality: Senegalese

Sport
- Sport: Judo

Djibril Sambou is a Senegalese judoka. He competed in the men's half-lightweight event at the 1980 Summer Olympics.
