= Rafet Güngör =

Turkish judoka

Personal information
- Nationality: Turkish
- Born: 17 September 1949 (age 75)

Sport
- Sport: Judo

Rafet Güngör (born 17 September 1949) is a Turkish judoka. He competed in the men's half-middleweight event at the 1976 Summer Olympics.
