= Anelson Vieira =

Brazilian judoka

Personal information
- Full name: Anelson Guerra Vieira
- Born: 19 February 1954 (age 71); Rio de Janeiro, Brazil
- Height: 164 cm (5 ft 5 in)
- Weight: 71 kg (157 lb)

Sport
- Sport: Judo

Anelson Guerra Vieira (Note: This name uses Portuguese naming customs: the first or maternal family name is Guerra and the second or paternal family name is Vieira.) (born 19 February 1954) is a Brazilian judoka. He competed in the men's lightweight event at the 1980 Summer Olympics.
