= Cornel Roman =

Romanian judoka

Personal information
- Nationality: Romanian
- Born: 12 April 1952 (age 72); Bucharest, Romania

Sport
- Sport: Judo

Cornel Roman (born 12 April 1952) is a Romanian judoka. He competed in the men's lightweight event at the 1980 Summer Olympics.
