= Klaus Wallas =

Austrian judoka

Personal information
- Nationality: Austrian
- Born: 31 March 1953 (age 71); Salzburg, Austria
- Occupation: Judoka

Sport
- Sport: Judo

Profile at external databases
- JudoInside.com: 5699

Klaus Wallas (born 31 March 1953) is an Austrian judoka. He competed in the men's heavyweight event at the 1976 Summer Olympics.

He was later a professional wrestler between 1978 and 1986 wrestling in Austria, Germany, Japan and Egypt where he challenged local champion Mamdouh Farag.
