= 1974 Asian Judo Championships =

Judo competition

The 1974 Asian Judo Championships were held in Seoul, South Korea November.

== Medal overview ==
=== Men's events ===
Event	Gold	Silver	Bronze
Lightweight (63 kg)	Yoshiharu Minami (JPN)	Zheng (ROC)	Chyung Jae-Young (KOR)
Lightweight (63 kg)	Yoshiharu Minami (JPN)	Zheng (ROC)	Renato Repuyan (PHI)
Middleweight (70 kg)	Koji Kuramoto (JPN)	Ronald (HKG)	Han Sung-chul (KOR)
Middleweight (70 kg)	Koji Kuramoto (JPN)	Ronald (HKG)	Geronimo Dyogi (PHI)
Middleweight (80 kg)	Shozo Fujii (JPN)	Kim Dae-Yong (KOR)	Hong (ROC)
Middleweight (80 kg)	Shozo Fujii (JPN)	Kim Dae-Yong (KOR)	Oscar (PHI)
Middleweight (93 kg)	Katsuhiko Iwata (JPN)	Suranta Ginting (INA)	Kwon (KOR)
Middleweight (93 kg)	Katsuhiko Iwata (JPN)	Suranta Ginting (INA)	Fernando Garcia (PHI)
Heavyweight (+93 kg)	Sumio Endo (JPN)	Na Jung-Deuk (KOR)	Zheng (ROC)
Heavyweight (+93 kg)	Sumio Endo (JPN)	Na Jung-Deuk (KOR)	Raymond (INA)
Openweight	Shozo Fujii (JPN)	Sumio Endo (JPN)	Cho Jae-gi (KOR)
Openweight	Shozo Fujii (JPN)	Sumio Endo (JPN)	Kwon (KOR)

=== Medals table ===
Rank	Nation	Gold	Silver	Bronze	Total
1	Japan	6	1	0	7
2	South Korea	0	2	5	7
3	Republic of China	0	1	2	3
4	Indonesia	0	1	1	2
5	Hong Kong	0	1	0	1
6	Philippines	0	0	4	4
Totals (6 entries)		6	6	12	24
