= John Van Hoek =

Australian judoka

Personal information
- Nationality: Australian
- Born: 11 December 1952 (age 72)

Sport
- Sport: Judo

John Van Hoek (born 11 December 1952) is an Australian judoka. He competed in the men's half-middleweight event at the 1976 Summer Olympics.
