= Günter Krüger (judoka) =

East German judoka (born 1953)

Personal information
- Born: 10 January 1953 (age 73)
- Occupation: Judoka

Sport
- Sport: Judo
Medal record
Men's judo
European Championships
Gold medal – first place	1974 London
Gold medal – first place	1978 Helsinki
Bronze medal – third place	1975 Lyon
Bronze medal – third place	1977 Ludwigshafen
Bronze medal – third place	1979 Brussels

Profile at external databases
- JudoInside.com: 5601

Günter Krüger (born 10 January 1953 in Pasewalk) is a German judo athlete, who competed for the SC Dynamo Hoppegarten / Sportvereinigung (SV) Dynamo. He won medals at international competitions.
