= Manuel Chavez =

Costa Rican judoka

Personal information
- Nationality: Costa Rican

Sport
- Sport: Judo

Manuel Chaves is a Costa Rican judoka. He competed in the men's lightweight event at the 1980 Summer Olympics.
