= Lee Chang-seon =

South Korean judoka

Personal information
- Nationality: South Korean
- Born: 11 January 1956 (age 69)

Sport
- Sport: Judo

Lee Chang-seon (born 11 January 1956) is a South Korean judoka. He competed in the men's half-middleweight event at the 1976 Summer Olympics.
