= Niokhor Dionge =

Senegalese judoka

Personal information
- Nationality: Senegalese
- Born: 15 February 1962 (age 63)

Sport
- Sport: Judo

Niokhor Dionge (born 15 February 1962) is a Senegalese judoka. He competed in the men's lightweight event at the 1980 Summer Olympics.
