= Halldór Guðbjörnsson =

Icelandic judoka (born 1946)

Personal information
- Nationality: Icelandic
- Born: 21 September 1946 (age 78)

Sport
- Sport: Judo

Halldór Guðbjörnsson (born 21 September 1946) is an Icelandic judoka. He competed in the men's lightweight event at the 1980 Summer Olympics.
