= Jaakko Saari =

Finnish judoka

Personal information
- Nationality: Finnish
- Born: 3 November 1957 (age 67); Jyväskylän maalaiskunta, Finland

Sport
- Sport: Judo

Jaakko Saari (born 3 November 1957) is a Finnish judoka. He competed in the men's open category event at the 1980 Summer Olympics.
