= José António Branco =

Portuguese judoka (born 1959)

Personal information
- Nationality: Portuguese
- Born: 5 October 1959 (age 65)
- Occupation: Judoka

Sport
- Sport: Judo

Profile at external databases
- IJF: 54210
- JudoInside.com: 13319

José António Branco (born 5 October 1959) is a Portuguese judoka. He competed in the men's half-lightweight event at the 1980 Summer Olympics.
