= András Ozsvár =

Hungarian judoka (born 1957)

Personal information
- Born: 19 February 1957 (age 69)
- Occupation: Judoka

Sport
- Country: Hungary
- Sport: Judo
- Weight class: +95 kg, Open

Achievements and titles
- Olympic Games: (bronze) (1980)
- World Champ.: (bronze) (1981, 1983)
- European Champ.: (silver) (1982)
Medal record
Men's judo
Representing Hungary
Olympic Games
Bronze medal – third place	1980 Moscow	Open
World Championships
Bronze medal – third place	1981 Maastricht	Open
Bronze medal – third place	1983 Moscow	Open
European Championships
Silver medal – second place	1982 Rostock	Open
Bronze medal – third place	1981 Debrecen	Open
Bronze medal – third place	1982 Rostock	+95 kg
European Junior Championships
Gold medal – first place	1977 Berlin	+95 kg

Profile at external databases
- IJF: 54338
- JudoInside.com: 17107
- Updated on 20 June 2023

András Ozsvár (born 19 February 1957 in Csongrád) is a Hungarian former judoka who competed in the 1980 Summer Olympics.
