= Jaroslav Kříž =

Czech judoka

Personal information
- Nationality: Czech
- Born: 12 March 1955 (age 70); Jihlava, Czechoslovakia

Sport
- Sport: Judo

Jaroslav Kříž (born 12 March 1955) is a Czech judoka. He competed in the men's half-lightweight event at the 1980 Summer Olympics.
