= Jaime Felipa =

Curaçaoan judoka (1944–2011)

Personal information
- Born: 13 June 1944 Willemstad, Curaçao
- Died: 5 March 2011 (aged 66) Willemstad, Curaçao

Sport
- Sport: Judo
Medal record
Men's judo
Representing Netherlands Antilles
Pan American Games
Silver medal – second place	1975 Mexico City	Open
Bronze medal – third place	1979 San Juan	Heavyweight
Central American and Caribbean Games
Gold medal – first place	1974 Santo Domingo	Open
Silver medal – second place	1978 Medellín	Heavyweight
Bronze medal – third place	1978 Medellín	Open

Jaime Antonio Felipa (13 June 1944 – 5 March 2011) was a Curaçaoan judoka. During his career, he found success in regional competitions, earning medals at the Pan American Games and Central American and Caribbean Games. He also competed for the Netherlands Antilles at the 1976 Summer Olympics. For his services in sport, he was named the 1974 Sportsman of the Year by the Sportswriters Association of Curaçao and was posthumously inducted into the Curaçao Olympic Committee Hall of Fame.

== Biography ==
Jaime Antonio Felipa was born on 13 June 1944 in Willemstad, Curaçao. Throughout his judo career, he adopted the nicknames "Giant Felipa" and "The Curaçao Giant".

At the 1974 Central American and Caribbean Games held in Santo Domingo, Dominican Republic, he competed in the men's open division and won the gold medal with an ippon. He also competed in the 1974 Pan American Judo Championships held in Panama and placed fifth out of the 19 entrants. He competed despite bruises and ribcage injuries he sustained from his first bout. The following year, he was named Sportsman of the Year by the Sportswriters Association of Curaçao. During this time, he worked as an airport security guard at Curaçao International Airport and held judo lessons in various locations in Curaçao such as Bandabou. That same year, he won a silver medal in the men's open division at the 1975 Pan American Games held in Mexico City.

For the 1976 Summer Olympics held in Montreal, Felipa was selected to represent the Netherlands Antilles. He competed in the men's heavyweight division though lost to eventual bronze medal winner Allen Coage in his first bout. Overall, Felipa placed equal 12th. After the 1976 Summer Games, he competed in the 1978 Central American and Caribbean Games held in Medellín, winning a silver in the men's heavyweight and a bronze in the men's open divisions. The following year, he won a bronze medal in the men's heavyweight division at the 1979 Pan American Games held in San Juan.

In 1984, he trained boxers at the Sentro di Bario Brievengat, a cultural center. He died on 6 March 2011 in Willemstad at the age of 66. In 2024, he was posthumously inducted into the Curaçao Olympic Committee Hall of Fame.
