= Koji Kuramoto =

Japanese judoka (born 1951)

Personal information
- Born: 14 August 1951 (age 74)
- Occupation: Judoka

Sport
- Country: Japan
- Sport: Judo
- Weight class: ‍–‍70 kg

Achievements and titles
- Olympic Games: (silver) (1976)
- World Champ.: (bronze) (1975)
- Asian Champ.: (gold) (1974)
Medal record
Men's judo
Representing Japan
Olympic Games
Silver medal – second place	1976 Montreal	‍–‍70 kg
World Championships
Bronze medal – third place	1975 Vienna	‍–‍70 kg
Asian Championships
Gold medal – first place	1974 Seoul	‍–‍70 kg

Profile at external databases
- IJF: 47450
- JudoInside.com: 5416
- Updated on 21 June 2023

Koji Kuramoto (蔵本 孝二, Kuramoto kōji; born 14 August 1951) is a Japanese former judoka who competed in the 1976 Summer Olympics.
