= Jhonny MacKay =

Ecuadorian judoka

Personal information
- Nationality: Ecuadorian
- Born: 20 January 1954 (age 71)

Sport
- Sport: Judo

Jhonny MacKay (born 20 January 1954) is an Ecuadorian judoka. He competed in the men's half-middleweight event at the 1976 Summer Olympics.
