= Kim Byong-gun =

North Korean judoka (born 1955)

Personal information
- Native name: 김병건
- Nationality: North Korean
- Born: 15 November 1955 (age 69)

Sport
- Sport: Judo

Kim Byong-gun (Korean: 김병건; born 15 November 1955) is a North Korean judoka. He competed in the men's lightweight event at the 1980 Summer Olympics.
