= Maurice Nkandem =

Cameroonian judoka

Personal information
- Nationality: Cameroonian
- Born: 9 November 1951 (age 73)

Sport
- Sport: Judo

Maurice Nkandem (born 9 November 1951) is a Cameroonian judoka. He competed in the men's lightweight event at the 1980 Summer Olympics.
