= Michael Picken =

Australian judoka

Personal information
- Nationality: Australian
- Born: 8 October 1954 (age 70)

Sport
- Sport: Judo

Michael Picken (born 8 October 1954) is an Australian judoka. He competed in the men's lightweight event at the 1980 Summer Olympics.
