= Shota Chochishvili =

Georgian judoka and professional wrestler (1950 – 2009)

- Chochishvili (left) at the 1972 Olympics

Personal information
- Full name: Shota Samsonovich Chochishvili
- Born: 10 July 1950 Ghvlevi, Kareli, Georgian SSR, Soviet Union
- Died: 27 August 2009 (aged 59) Gori, Georgia
- Occupation: Judoka
- Height: 190 cm (6 ft 3 in)
- Weight: 110 kg (243 lb)
- Professional wrestling career
- Ring name: Shota Chochishvili
- Billed from: Ghvlevi, Georgia
- Debut: 24 April 1989
- Retired: 31 December 1989

Sport
- Country: Soviet Union
- Sport: Judo
- Weight class: ‍–‍93 kg, Open
- Club: Burevestnik Gori

Achievements and titles
- Olympic Games: (gold) (1972)
- World Champ.: (bronze) (1975)
- European Champ.: (silver) (1973, 1974, 1975)
Medal record
Men's judo
Representing Soviet Union
Olympic Games
Gold medal – first place	1972 Munich	‍–‍93 kg
Bronze medal – third place	1976 Montreal	Open
World Championships
Bronze medal – third place	1975 Vienna	Open
European Championships
Silver medal – second place	1973 Madrid	Open
Silver medal – second place	1974 London	Open
Silver medal – second place	1975 Lyon	Open
Silver medal – second place	1976 Kiev	Men's team
Bronze medal – third place	1977 Ludwigshafen	Open

Profile at external databases
- IJF: 54445
- JudoInside.com: 5775
- Updated on 21 June 2023

Shota Samsonovich Chochishvili (Georgian: შოთა ჩოჩიშვილი, Russian: Шота Самсонович Чочишвили; 10 July 1950 – 27 August 2009) was a Georgian professional wrestler and judoka.

== Judo career ==
Between 1972 and 1977, Chochishvili won one gold, four silver and three bronze medals at the Olympics and world and European championships, including an Olympic gold medal in 1972.

== Professional wrestling career ==
=== New Japan Pro-Wrestling (1989) ===
In 1989, Chochishvili briefly competed in the Japanese New Japan Pro-Wrestling (NJPW) promotion. On 24 April at NJPW's inaugural Tokyo Dome event called Battle Satellite in Tokyo Dome, Chochishvili competed in a match against NJPW founder Antonio Inoki, defeating him by knockout to win the WWF World Martial Arts Heavyweight Championship. On 25 May, Chochishvili defended the title against Inoki, but was unsuccessful with Inoki winning the match and championship by submission. On New Year's Eve 1989, he was involved in the first wrestling event held in the USSR hosted by NJPW in Moscow. In the tag team match main event, Chochishvili teamed with Inoki to defeat former Olympic wrestlers Masa Saito and Brad Rheingans.

== Personal life ==
In retirement Chochishvili worked as a judo coach; he also served as vice-president of the Georgian Olympic Committee and of the Georgian Judo Federation. His son Ramaz became an international judoka and competed for Ukraine. In 2003, Chochishvili had a heart surgery and was diagnosed with cancer. From 2004–2008, he underwent chemotherapy, but died from leukemia in 2009, aged 59.

== Championships and accomplishments ==
- New Japan Pro-Wrestling
  - WWF World Martial Arts Heavyweight Championship (1 time)
