= Serhiy Novikov =

Russian judoka (1949–2021)

Personal information
- Full name: Sergey Petrovich Novikov
- Born: 15 December 1949 Moscow, Russian SFSR, Soviet Union
- Died: 16 April 2021 (aged 71) Moscow, Russian SFSR, Soviet Union
- Occupation: Judoka

Sport
- Country: Soviet Union; Russia
- Sport: Judo
- Weight class: +93 kg, Open

Achievements and titles
- Olympic Games: (gold) (1976)
- World Champ.: (silver) (1975)
- European Champ.: (gold) (1973, 1974, 1976)
Medal record
Men's judo
Representing Soviet Union
Olympic Games
Gold medal – first place	1976 Montreal	+93 kg
World Championships
Silver medal – second place	1975 Vienna	+93 kg
Bronze medal – third place	1973 Lausanne	+93 kg
European Championships
Gold medal – first place	1973 Madrid	Open
Gold medal – first place	1974 London	Open
Gold medal – first place	1976 Kyiv	+93 kg
Silver medal – second place	1975 Lyon	+93 kg
Bronze medal – third place	1970 Berlin	Open
Bronze medal – third place	1972 Voorburg	Open
Bronze medal – third place	1978 Helsinki	+95 kg
Bronze medal – third place	1980 Vienna	Open

Profile at external databases
- IJF: 54334
- JudoInside.com: 5867
- Updated on 21 June 2023

Sergey Petrovich Novikov (Russian: Серге́й Петрович Новиков, 15 December 1949 in Moscow – 16 April 2021) was a Russian Soviet Olympic champion judoka. He competed for the Soviet Union at the 1976 Summer Olympics, where he won the gold medal in the men's heavyweight division. He also competed at the 1980 Summer Olympics, in the open category.

In 2000 he founded the International Unifight Federation, in Paris. He went on to serve as the President of Russian Unifight Federation.
