= Jean-Luc Rougé =

French judoka (born 1949)

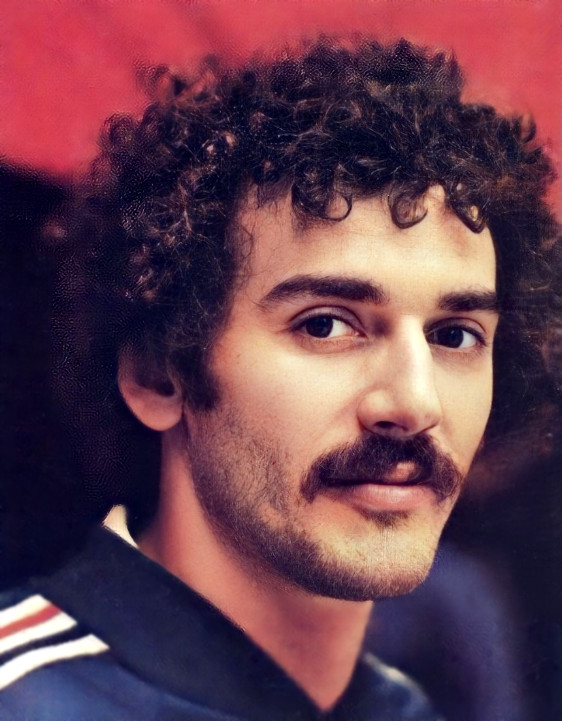
- Jean-Luc Rouge (1976)

Personal information
- Born: 30 May 1949 (age 77) Clichy, Hauts-de-Seine, France
- Occupation: Judoka
- Height: 1.90 m (6 ft 3 in)

Sport
- Country: France
- Sport: Judo
- Weight class: –93 kg, +95 kg
- Rank: 10th dan black belt

Achievements and titles
- Olympic Games: 5th (1976)
- World Champ.: (1975)
- European Champ.: (gold) (1973, 1977, 1979, 1980)
Medal record
Men's judo
Representing France
World Championships
Gold medal – first place	1975 Vienna	–93 kg
Silver medal – second place	1979 Paris	+95 kg
Bronze medal – third place	1979 Paris	Open
European Championships
Gold medal – first place	1973 Madrid	–93 kg
Gold medal – first place	1977 Ludwigshafen	+95 kg
Gold medal – first place	1979 Brussels	+95 kg
Gold medal – first place	1980 Vienna	–95 kg
Silver medal – second place	1975 Lyon	–93 kg
Silver medal – second place	1978 Helsinki	Open
Bronze medal – third place	1978 Helsinki	+95 kg
European Junior Championships
Gold medal – first place	1969 Berlin	–93 kg
European Cadet Championships
Gold medal – first place	1967 Lisbon	–85 kg

Profile at external databases
- IJF: 26416
- JudoInside.com: 5222
- Updated on 10 March 2023

Jean-Luc Rougé (born 30 May 1949, Clichy, Hauts-de-Seine) is a French judoka. He competed at the 1976 Summer Olympics and the 1980 Summer Olympics.

== Biography ==
Fighting in the under 93 kg weight division, Rougé was the first French judoka to win gold medal at the World Judo Championships in 1975. He was elected president of the French Judo Federation in 2005, replacing Michel Vial. He was also a candidate for the 1993 French parliamentary elections under the banner of Rassemblement par le sport. On 23 November 2013 Rougé was promoted to the rank of 9th dan, and on 13 December 2023 it was announced that he had been promoted to exclusive and exalted rank of 10th dan.

A Harai goshi specialist, Rougé wrote a comprehensive book on the technique.

== Awards ==
- World Judo Championships
  - Gold medal in the 93 kg-World Championship in Vienna in 1975.
  - Silver medal in 95 kg to World Championship in Paris in 1979.
  - Bronze medal in open category in the World Championship in Paris in 1979.
