= Shōzō Fujii =

Japanese judoka

Personal information
- Born: 11 May 1950 (age 76)
- Occupation: Judoka

Sport
- Sport: Judo
Medal record
Men's Judo
World Championships
Gold medal – first place	1971 Ludwigshafen	-80 kg
Gold medal – first place	1973 Lausanne	-80 kg
Gold medal – first place	1975 Vienna	-80 kg
Gold medal – first place	1979 Paris	-78 kg
Asian Championships
Gold medal – first place	1974 Seoul	-80 kg
Gold medal – first place	1974 Seoul	Open

Profile at external databases
- IJF: 47449
- JudoInside.com: 5361

Shozo Fujii (藤猪 省太, Fujii Shōzō; born 11 May 1950) is a Japanese judoka. He won a gold medal 4 times at the World Championships.

He is from Higashikagawa, Kagawa. After graduation from Tenri University in 1973, he belonged to Kuraray. One year after, He got a job at Kyoto Sangyo University and among his students was Olympic Games champion in 1984, Yoshiyuki Matsuoka.

As of 2010, Fujii coaches judo at his alma mater, Tenri University, where he previously studied as an undergraduate.
