= Issam Tombakji =

Syrian judoka

Personal information
- Nationality: Syrian
- Born: 10 November 1960 (age 64)

Sport
- Sport: Judo

Issam Tombakji (born 10 November 1960) is a Syrian judoka. He competed in the men's lightweight event at the 1980 Summer Olympics, where he came in tied for last at 19th.
