= Iliyan Nedkov =

Bulgarian Olympic judoka

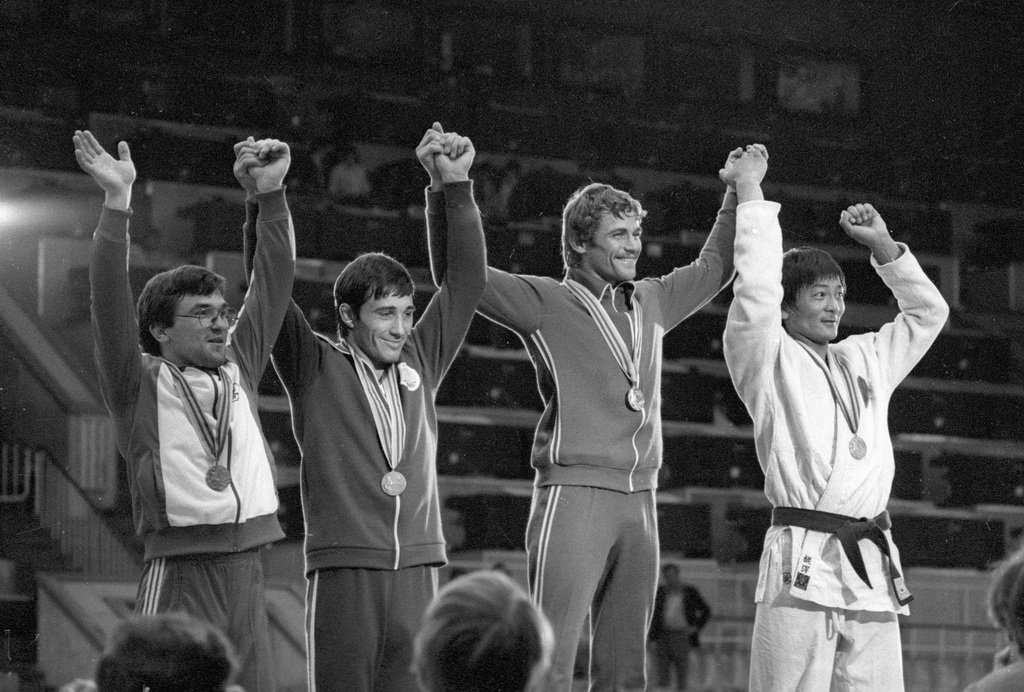
- Iliyan Nedkov (second from left), bronze medalist at the 1980 Summer Olympics.

Personal information
- Born: 18 March 1958 (age 68)
- Occupation: Judoka

Sport
- Country: Bulgaria
- Sport: Judo
- Weight class: ‍–‍65 kg, ‍–‍71 kg

Achievements and titles
- Olympic Games: (bronze) (1980)
- World Champ.: 5th (1983)
- European Champ.: (bronze) (1981)
Medal record
Men's judo
Representing Bulgaria
Olympic Games
Bronze medal – third place	1980 Moscow	‍–‍65 kg
European Championships
Bronze medal – third place	1981 Debrecen	‍–‍71 kg

Profile at external databases
- IJF: 503
- JudoInside.com: 745
- Updated on 19 June 2023

Iliyan Nedkov (Bulgarian: Илиян Недков; born 18 March 1958) is a Bulgarian former judoka who competed in the 1980 Summer Olympics.
