= Alonzo Henderson =

Irish judoka

Personal information
- Nationality: Irish
- Born: 22 December 1955 (age 69)
- Occupation: Judoka
- Height: 178 cm (5 ft 10 in)
- Weight: 71 kg (157 lb)

Sport
- Sport: Judo

Profile at external databases
- IJF: 54226
- JudoInside.com: 9793

Alonzo Henderson (born 22 December 1955) is an Irish judoka. He competed in the men's lightweight event at the 1980 Summer Olympics.
