= Vacinuff Morrison =

British judoka (born 1952)

Personal information
- Nationality: British
- Born: 19 May 1952 (age 74)

Sport
- Sport: Judo
Medal record
Representing Great Britain
European Championships
Bronze medal – third place	1973 Madrid	–70 kg
Bronze medal – third place	1973 Madrid	team

Vacinuff Morrison (born 19 May 1952) is a British judoka. He competed in the men's half-middleweight event at the 1976 Summer Olympics.

== Judo career ==
Morrison came to prominence after winning two bronze medals (individual and team) at the 1973 European Judo Championships. He became champion of Great Britain, winning the light-middleweight division at the British Judo Championships in 1974 and 1975.

In 1976, he was selected to represent Great Britain at the 1976 Summer Olympics, competing in the men's 70 kg division he just missed out on a medal after reaching the repechage final (bronze medal play off) but losing out to Patrick Vial. Later that year Morrison won a third British Championship, despite the weight class increasing to under 78 kg.
