= Tamaz Namgalauri =

Georgian judoka

Personal information
- Nationality: Georgian
- Born: 25 September 1957; Tbilisi, Georgia
- Died: 1 November 1991 (aged 34)

Sport
- Sport: Judo

Tamaz Namgalauri (25 September 1957 – 1 November 1991) was a Georgian judoka. He competed in the men's lightweight event at the 1980 Summer Olympics, representing the Soviet Union.
