= Neofitos Aresti =

Cypriot judoka (born 1958)

Personal information
- Nationality: Cypriot
- Born: 7 March 1958 (age 67)

Sport
- Sport: Judo

Neofitos Aresti (born 7 March 1958) is a Cypriot judoka. He competed in the men's lightweight event at the 1980 Summer Olympics.
