= Sumio Endo =

Japanese judoka (born 1950)

Personal information
- Born: 3 October 1950 (age 75)
- Occupation: Judoka

Sport
- Country: Japan
- Sport: Judo
- Weight class: +93 kg, Open

Achievements and titles
- Olympic Games: (bronze) (1976)
- World Champ.: (1975, 1979)
- Asian Champ.: (gold) (1974)
Medal record
Men's judo
Representing Japan
Olympic Games
| Bronze medal – third place | 1976 Montreal | +93 kg |
World Championships
| Gold medal – first place | 1975 Vienna | +93 kg |
| Gold medal – first place | 1979 Paris | Open |
Asian Championships
| Gold medal – first place | 1974 Seoul | +93 kg |
| Silver medal – second place | 1974 Seoul | Open |

Profile at external databases
- IJF: 54427
- JudoInside.com: 5357
- Updated on 21 June 2023

Sumio Endo (遠藤 純男, Endō Sumio; born 3 October 1950) is a Japanese judoka, Olympic medalist and world champion.

Endo is from Kōriyama, Fukushima. After graduation from Nihon University, He belonged to Tokyo Metropolitan Police Department.

Endo received a bronze medal in the heavyweight class at the 1976 Summer Olympics in Montreal. He is world champion from 1975 and from 1979.

As of 2008, Endo coaches judo at North Asia University in Akita, Japan. He is also one of the 'Frontier Ambassadors' of his hometown Koriyama City.
