= Pavel Drăgoi =

Romanian judoka

Personal information
- Nationality: Romanian
- Born: 6 February 1956 (age 69); Alba Iulia, Romania
- Occupation: Judoka

Sport
- Sport: Judo

Profile at external databases
- IJF: 54333
- JudoInside.com: 13306

Pavel Drăgoi (born 6 February 1956) is a Romanian judoka. He competed in the men's open category event at the 1980 Summer Olympics.
