= Roberto Machusso =

Brazilian judoka (born 1954)

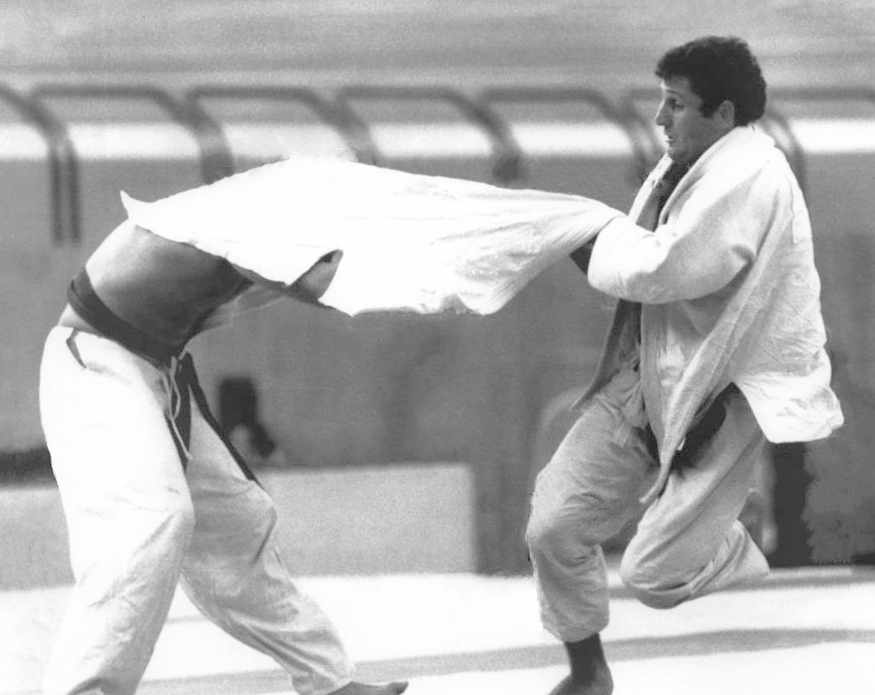
- Machusso (left) with Yona Melnik at the 1976 Olympics

Personal information
- Born: January 4, 1954 (age 72)
Medal record
Men's Judo
Representing Brazil
Pan American Games
Silver medal – second place	1975 Mexico City	Lightweight
Bronze medal – third place	1979 San Juan	Lightweight

Roberto Zuasnabar Machusso (born January 4, 1954) is a retired competitive judoka from Brazil, who represented his native country at the 1976 Summer Olympics in Montréal, Canada.

He twice claimed a medal at the Pan American Games, in 1975 and 1979. Machusso won the silver medal at the 1975 Pan American Games in the men's lightweight division (– 70 kg), after a loss in the final against Canada's Wayne Erdman.
