= Roukoz Roukoz =

Lebanese judoka

Personal information
- Nationality: Lebanese

Sport
- Sport: Judo

Roukoz Roukoz is a Lebanese judoka. He competed in the men's lightweight event at the 1980 Summer Olympics.
