= Dietmar Lorenz =

East German judoka (1950–2021)

- Dietmar Lorenz, bronze medalist at the 1980 Summer Olympics

Personal information
- Born: 23 September 1950 Langenbuch, Saxony, East Germany
- Died: 8 September 2021 (aged 70)
- Occupation: Judoka

Sport
- Country: East Germany
- Sport: Judo
- Weight class: ‍–‍93 kg, ‍–‍95 kg, Open

Achievements and titles
- Olympic Games: (gold) (1980)
- World Champ.: (bronze) (1973, 1975)
- European Champ.: (gold) (1975, 1977, 1978, 1978)
Medal record
Men's judo
Representing East Germany
Olympic Games
Gold medal – first place	1980 Moscow	Open
Bronze medal – third place	1980 Moscow	‍–‍95 kg
World Championships
Bronze medal – third place	1973 Lausanne	‍–‍93 kg
Bronze medal – third place	1975 Vienna	Open
European Championships
Gold medal – first place	1975 Lyon	‍–‍93 kg
Gold medal – first place	1977 Ludwigshafen	‍–‍95 kg
Gold medal – first place	1978 Helsinki	‍–‍95 kg
Gold medal – first place	1978 Helsinki	Open
Silver medal – second place	1980 Vienna	‍–‍95 kg
Bronze medal – third place	1973 Madrid	Open
Bronze medal – third place	1974 London	‍–‍93 kg
Jigoro Kano Cup
Gold medal – first place	1978 Tokyo	‍–‍95 kg

Profile at external databases
- IJF: 54287
- JudoInside.com: 5608
- Updated on 20 June 2023

Dietmar Lorenz (23 September 1950 – 8 September 2021) was an East German judoka, who competed for SC Dynamo Hoppegarten under the Sportvereinigung Dynamo.

Lorenz was born in the Saxon village of Langenbuch (Plauen rural district), which was incorporated into the newly founded Thuringian Schleiz district through the district government reorganization of 1952 in the GDR. After starting at home, he came via SV Dynamo Schleiz to SC Dynamo Hoppegarten, the sports club of the Volkspolizei, in 1969. He won medals at major international competitions, taking gold at the European Judo Championships and the World Judo Championships. He won as the first German at the Olympics and the Jigoro Kano Cup. As a member of the East German Olympic team, he took part in the 1980 Summer Olympics in Moscow. These games were boycotted by some countries, including Japan, whose Yasuhiro Yamashita and Sumio Endo were the reigning World Heavyweight and Open Class champions respectively.

He went as an outsider in the "Open Class" at the start. To the surprise of all judo experts, he defeated the favored opponents and won the final battle against Angelo Parisi of France, who was twelve kilos heavier than him.

He was later a coach for children at SC Berlin. He wore the nanadan (七段:ななだん): seventh degree black belt (also, shichidan), a component of the Dan rank.

Lorenz died on 8 September 2021, aged 70.
