= Edward Alkśnin =

Polish judoka

Personal information
- Nationality: Polish
- Born: 2 October 1954 (age 70); Grodno, Byelorussian SSR, Soviet Union

Sport
- Sport: Judo

Edward Alkśnin (born 2 October 1954) is a Polish judoka. He competed in the men's lightweight event at the 1980 Summer Olympics.
