= Güsemiin Jalaa =

Mongolian judoka (born 1949)

Personal information
- Nationality: Mongolian
- Born: 18 July 1949 (age 75)

Sport
- Sport: Judo

Güsemiin Jalaa (born 18 July 1949) is a Mongolian judoka. He competed at the 1976 Summer Olympics and the 1980 Summer Olympics.
