= Shagdaryn Dulmaa =

Mongolian poet and journalist (1934–2024)

- Шагдарын Дулмаа
- Born: 1934; Sergelen, Töv
- Died: 27 March 2024 (aged 89–90)
- Occupations: Poet and journalist

Shagdaryn Dulmaa (Mongolian: Шагдарын Дулмаа; 1934 – March 27, 2024) was a Mongolian poet and journalist.

== Early life and education ==
Shagdaryn Dulmaa was born in 1934 in Sergelen, Töv, Mongolia, and grew up in nearby Bayan.

She studied linguistics and literature at the National University of Mongolia, graduating in 1954. She then traveled to the Soviet Union for further studies, first at the Komsomol Central School from 1955 to 1958, and then in the Communist Party Institute's journalism program from 1965 to 1967.

== Career ==
Dulmaa was well known among Mongolian women poets. She studied with other famous Mongolian poets such as Begziin Yavuukhulan. Her work earned her the nickname "Dulmaa, Queen of the Royal Family."

She published more than 20 poetry collections, beginning with Üüriin Tsolmon in 1966. Her writing touches on women's internal lives, gender roles in Mongolia, love, and patriotism for her country. Her poems have been set to music, with many of them becoming popular on Mongolian radio.

She also worked as a journalist, spending 21 years with the Mongoliin Ünen newspaper's culture department, and publishing some 5,000 articles in various newspapers and magazines. As a journalist, she was involved in the Mongolian Writers Union, and she taught and lectured on both literature and journalism.

Dulmaa also spent 14 years working for the Mongolian Ministry of Education and Culture.

== Death and honors ==
For her poetry, Dulmaa was a winner of the Natsagdorj Literary Prize. She was named an Honored Cultural Worker (2007) and People's Writer of Mongolia (2014).

In 2023, she was honored with a 1,000 tugrik stamp depicting her. She died the following year.
