= Franz Berger (judoka) =

Austrian judoka

Personal information
- Nationality: Austrian
- Born: 10 January 1958 (age 67) Matrei in Osttirol, Austria
- Occupation: Judoka

Sport
- Sport: Judo

Profile at external databases
- JudoInside.com: 9754

Franz Berger (born 10 January 1958) is an Austrian judoka. He competed in the men's open category event at the 1980 Summer Olympics.
