= Radomir Kovačević =

Yugoslav judoka

Personal information
- Born: 20 March 1954 Drvar
- Died: 14 June 2006 (aged 52) Belgrade
- Occupation: Judoka

Sport
- Country: Yugoslavia
- Sport: Judo
- Weight class: +95 kg, Open

Achievements and titles
- Olympic Games: (bronze) (1980)
- World Champ.: (bronze) (1979)
- European Champ.: (bronze) (1976)
Medal record
Men's judo
Representing Yugoslavia
Olympic Games
Bronze medal – third place	1980 Moscow	+95 kg
World Championships
Bronze medal – third place	1979 Paris	Open
European Championships
Bronze medal – third place	1976 Kyiv	Open

Profile at external databases
- IJF: 54178
- JudoInside.com: 5524
- Updated on 20 June 2023

Radomir Kovačević (20 March 1954 in Drvar — 14 June 2006 in Belgrade) was a Serbian and Yugoslav Olympic judoka and coach. He participated in three Olympic Games (Montreal 1976, Moscow 1980 and Los Angeles 1984) and was an Olympic medalist. He was well known in judo circles and was close friends with world-famous Japanese judo champion Yasuhiro Yamashita. He was a member of the NYC 2012 Olympic Bid Committee.

== Biography ==
Radomir Kovačević was born in Drvar, PR Bosnia and Herzegovina on 20 March 1954. His father was a World War II veteran. Kovačević grew up in and began practising sports in Drvar. He started Track and Field in 1967, at the age of thirteen. By age fifteen, he tried basketball, but said "I was very angry because regardless of how good I was, my opponent always scored."

The very next year, Kovačević became a wrestler in the Greco-Roman style in which one is only allowed to use the upper half of his body. In one year, he became champion of Yugoslavia, which was quite an accomplishment, considering that Yugoslavia was a world powerhouse in wrestling at the time.

In the summer of 1971, after wrestling practice, Kovačević had decided to change sports yet again, when he saw a small Japanese man "throwing people like paper airplanes", as he put it, at a local Judo club. The same day, he resigned from his wrestling club and joined the judo club. After training for six months at that club, he managed to throw the Japanese on one knee. On the spot, the Japanese offered to send him to Japan to study judo.

Two days later, he was flown off to Japan, where he enrolled in Tokai University and continued to practice Judo. He competed for the college and on his fourth year became captain of the judo team. He was one of the few foreigners to become captain of a Japanese judo team. During his time in Japan, he also gained interest in Eastern religion and philosophy.

In 1980, he became a bronze-medalist at the Moscow Olympics. He was a coach at The Dwight School in Manhattan and trained many champions in various sports, including wrestling, tennis, basketball, and sailing, among others. Many families who enrolled their children in Dwight over the years asked Kovačević to help their troubled sons. He saved them from some physical flaws and ailments that were thought to be incurable by doctors.

Starting in the late 1990s, Kovačević held a three-to-four-hour-long Judo class on Saturdays at the Spartak Judo Club, in Forest Hills. Despite the fact that the classes were usually between three and seven people full, they were effective in building and attracting champion judo players.

== Death ==
On 15 June 2006, after eighteen months of fighting cancer, Kovačević died in Belgrade. He was cremated, and his ashes were divided into two urns. One stayed in Belgrade while the other one was taken to Tōkai University in Tokyo.
