= Wolfgang Zuckschwerdt =

German judoka (1949–2026)

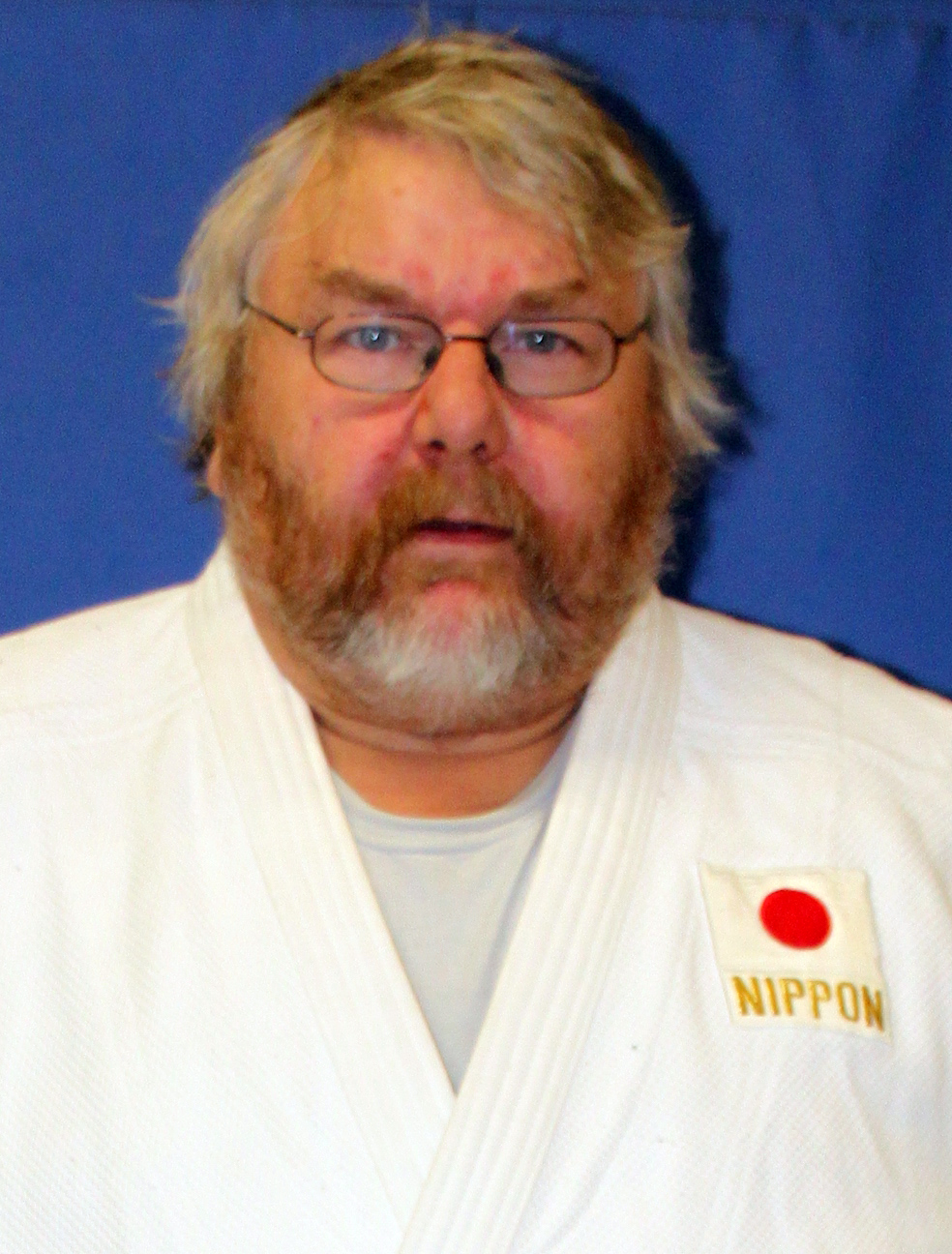

Personal information
- Born: 5 May 1949
- Died: 14 April 2026 (aged 76)
- Occupation: Judoka

Sport
- Sport: Judo
- Rank: 7th dan black belt
Medal record
Men's judo
World Championships
Bronze medal – third place	1973 Lausanne	Open
European Championships
Silver medal – second place	1975 Lyon	All Categories
Bronze medal – third place	1973 Madrid	All Categories
Bronze medal – third place	1974 London	All Categories
Bronze medal – third place	1977 Ludwigshafen	All Categories

Profile at external databases
- JudoInside.com: 5642

Wolfgang Zuckschwerdt (5 May 1949 – 14 April 2026) was a German judo athlete, who competed for the SG Dynamo Brandenburg / Sportvereinigung (SV) Dynamo. He won medals at international competitions. Zuckschwerdt died on 14 April 2026, at the age of 76.
