= Emil Petrunov =

Bulgarian judoka

Personal information
- Nationality: Bulgarian
- Born: 6 June 1955 (age 69)

Sport
- Sport: Judo

Emil Petrunov (Bulgarian: Емил Петрунов, born 6 June 1955) is a Bulgarian judoka. He competed in the men's heavyweight event at the 1976 Summer Olympics.
