= Robert Van de Walle =

Belgian judoka

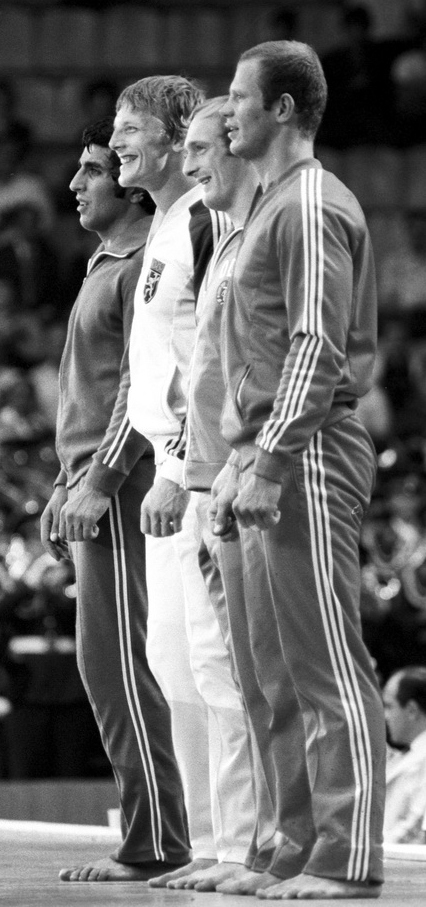
- Van de Walle (2nd left) at the 1980 Olympics

Personal information
- Born: 20 May 1954 (age 72) Ostend, Belgium
- Occupation: Judoka
- Height: 1.87 m (6 ft 2 in)

Sport
- Country: Belgium
- Sport: Judo
- Weight class: –95 kg, Open
- Rank: 9th dan black belt
- Club: Crossing Schaerbeek

Achievements and titles
- Olympic Games: (gold) (1980)
- World Champ.: (silver) (1979, 1981)
- European Champ.: (gold) (1980, 1985, 1986)
Medal record
Men's judo
Representing Belgium
Olympic Games
Gold medal – first place	1980 Moscow	‍–‍95 kg
Bronze medal – third place	1988 Seoul	‍–‍95 kg
World Championships
Silver medal – second place	1979 Paris	‍–‍95 kg
Silver medal – second place	1981 Maastricht	‍–‍95 kg
Bronze medal – third place	1981 Maastricht	Open
Bronze medal – third place	1983 Moscow	Open
Bronze medal – third place	1983 Moscow	‍–‍95 kg
Bronze medal – third place	1985 Seoul	‍–‍95 kg
Bronze medal – third place	1989 Belgrade	‍–‍95 kg
European Championships
Gold medal – first place	1980 Vienna	Open
Gold medal – first place	1985 Hamar	‍–‍95 kg
Gold medal – first place	1986 Belgrade	‍–‍95 kg
Silver medal – second place	1976 Kyiv	‍–‍93 kg
Silver medal – second place	1977 Ludwigshafen	‍–‍95 kg
Silver medal – second place	1979 Brussels	‍–‍95 kg
Silver medal – second place	1983 Paris	Open
Silver medal – second place	1984 Liege	‍–‍95 kg
Bronze medal – third place	1977 Ludwigshafen	Open
Bronze medal – third place	1978 Helsinki	‍–‍95 kg
Bronze medal – third place	1979 Brussels	Open
Bronze medal – third place	1980 Vienna	‍–‍95 kg
Bronze medal – third place	1981 Debrecen	‍–‍95 kg
Bronze medal – third place	1983 Paris	‍–‍95 kg
Bronze medal – third place	1984 Liege	Open
Bronze medal – third place	1987 Paris	‍–‍95 kg
Bronze medal – third place	1988 Pamplona	‍–‍95 kg
World Juniors Championships
Silver medal – second place	1974 Rio de Janeiro	‍–‍93 kg
European Cadet Championships
Bronze medal – third place	1971 Naples	‍–‍85 kg

Profile at external databases
- IJF: 8904
- JudoInside.com: 4760
- Updated on 18 June 2023

Robert Van de Walle (born 20 May 1954) is a retired Belgian judoka. He was the first judoka to ever compete at five Olympics, from 1976 to 1992. Competing in the half-heavyweight category he won the gold medal in 1980 and a bronze in 1988 at the age of 34. Van de Walle won European titles in 1980, 1985 and 1986. Together with Ingrid Berghmans he was the face of Belgian judo in the late 1970s and 1980s. After retiring from competitions he ran a coaching company together with his wife. He was the head of the Belgian delegation at the 2004 Summer Olympics. In summer 2021, 14 years after obtaining the rank of black belt 8th dan; Van De Walle, currently a member of Judo Club Crossing Schaerbeek, accepted his promotion to 9th dan from the International Judo Federation.

== Bibliography ==
- (1993) "Pick-ups" Judo Masterclass Techniques Ippon Books
