= Shagdaryn Chanrav =

Mongolian judoka (1948–2007)

Personal information
- Nationality: Mongolian
- Born: 20 November 1948; Khüreemaral, Mongolian People's Republic
- Died: 10 August 2007 (aged 58)

Sport
- Sport: Judo

Shagdaryn Chanrav (20 November 1948 – 10 August 2007) was a Mongolian judoka. He competed in the men's half-middleweight event at the 1976 Summer Olympics.
