= Jean-Pierre Gibert =

French canon lawyer

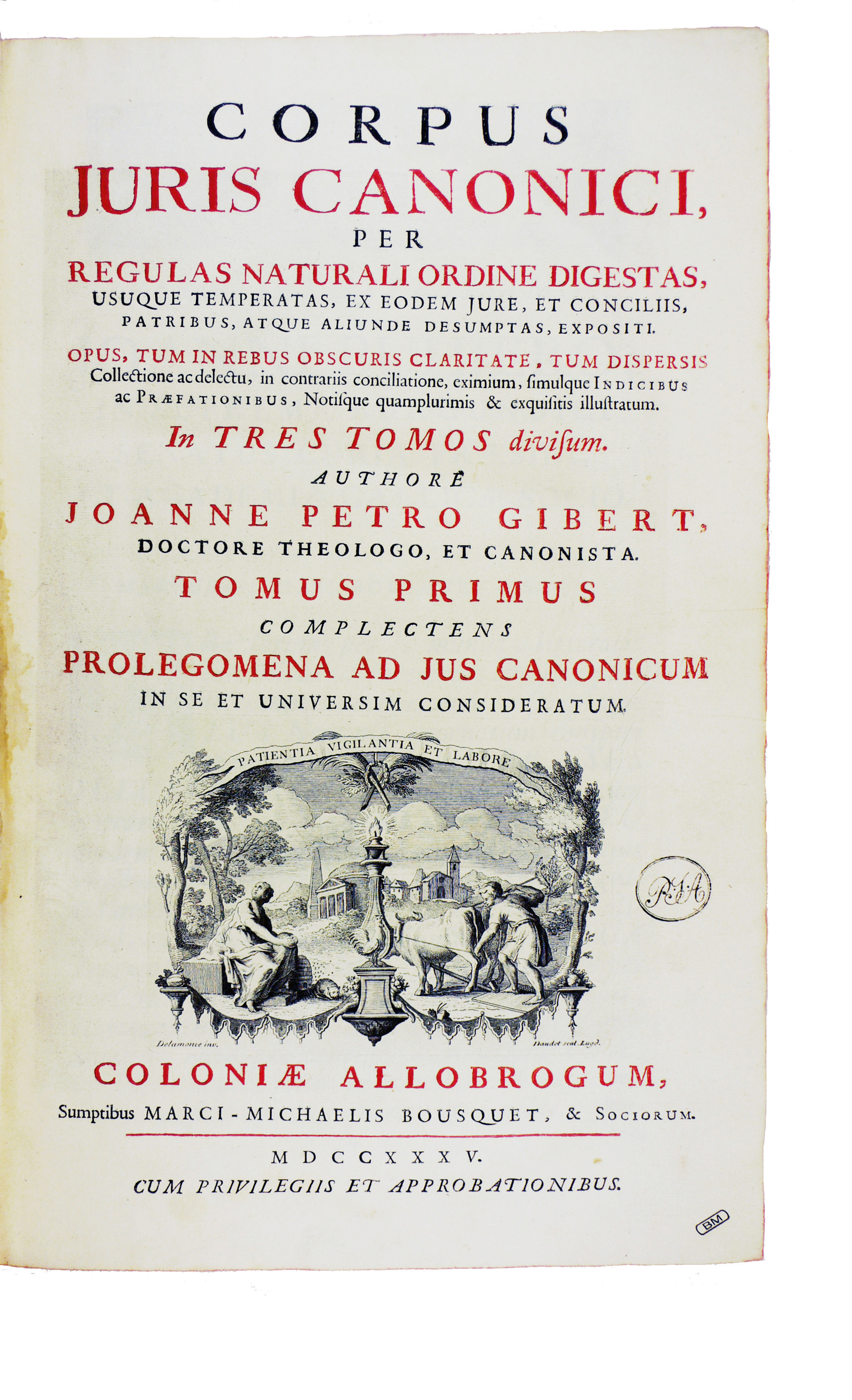
Corpus juris canonici, 1735

Jean-Pierre Gibert (1660–1736) was a French canon lawyer.

== Biography ==
Gibert was born at Aix-en-Provence. He became a cleric at an early age, receiving the tonsure only; he studied in Aix, and became a doctor of theology and canon law. He taught ecclesiastical law in the seminaries of Toulon and Aix, and settled in Paris in 1703, where he lived and worked in retirement and where he died.

Gibert was a moderate Gallican.

== Works ==
- Doctrina canonum in corpore juris inclusorum, circa consensum parentum requisitum ad matrimonium filiorum minorum (Paris, 1709)
- Institutions ecclésiastiques et bénéficiales suivant les principes du droit commun et les usages de France (Paris, 1720 and 1736)
- Usages de l'Église gallicane concernant les consures et l'irrégularité considérées en général et en particulier (Paris, 1724 and 1750)
- Tradition ou Histoire de l'Église sur le sacrement de mariage (Paris, 1725)
- Consultations canoniques sur les sacrements (Paris, 1721–1725 and 1750)
- Corpus juris canonici per regulas naturali ordine digestas, usuque temperates, ex eodem jure et conciliis, patribus atque aliunde desumptas (Geneva, 1736; Lyons, 1737), on canon law, in which the writer deviates from the order of the Corpus Juris
