= Hans-Jakob Schädler =

Liechtenstein judoka (born 1945)

Personal information
- Nationality: Liechtenstein
- Born: 30 October 1945 (age 79)

Sport
- Sport: Judo

Hans-Jakob Schädler (born 30 October 1945) is a Liechtenstein judoka. He competed at the 1972 Summer Olympics and the 1976 Summer Olympics.
