= 1973 European Judo Championships =

1973 Judo European Judo Championships
- Venue: Community of Madrid Sports Centre
- Location: Madrid, Spain
- Dates: 12–13 May 1973

Competition at external databases
- Links: JudoInside

The 1973 European Judo Championships were the 22nd edition of the European Judo Championships, and were held in Madrid, Spain from 12 to 13 May 1973. Championships were subdivided into six individual competitions, and a separate team competition.

== Medal overview ==
=== Individual ===
Event	Gold	Silver	Bronze
63 kg	(Soviet Union) Sergey Melnichenko	(Soviet Union) Shengeli Pitskhelauri	(France) Michel Algisi (East Germany) Karl-Heinz Werner
70 kg	(East Germany) Dietmar Hoetger	(West Germany) Engelbert Dörbandt	(Italy) Franco Novasconi (United Kingdom) Vacinuff Morrison
80 kg	(United Kingdom) Brian Jacks	(France) Guy Auffray	(East Germany) Bernd Look (Soviet Union) Guram Gogolauri
93 kg	(France) Jean-Luc Rougé	(United Kingdom) David Starbrook	(Soviet Union) Evgeny Solodukhin (Soviet Union) Amiran Muzaev
93+ kg	(Spain) Santiago Ojeda	(United Kingdom) Keith Remfry	(Netherlands) Peter Adelaar (Soviet Union) Dzhibilo Nizharadze
Open class	(Soviet Union) Sergey Novikov	(Soviet Union) Shota Chochishvili	(East Germany) Dietmar Lorenz (East Germany) Wolfgang Zueckschwerdt

=== Teams ===
Event	Gold	Silver	Bronze
Team	(Soviet Union) Soviet team: Shengeli Pitskhelauri; Vladimir Nevzorov; Guram Gogolauri; Evgeny Solodukhin; Anatoliy Novikov; Sergey Novikov	(France) French team: Jean-Jacques Mounier; Gérard Gautier; Guy Auffray; Jean-Luc Rougé; Jean-Pierre Tripet; François Besson	(United Kingdom) British team: Constantine Alexander; Vas Morrison; Brian Jacks; John Hindley; David Starbrook; Angelo Parisi (West Germany) West German team: Rainer Rutter; Engelbert Dörbandt; Fred Marhenke; Paul Barth; Klaus Glahn; Kurt Pilger

=== Medal table ===
Rank	Nation	Gold	Silver	Bronze	Total
1	Soviet Union	2	2	4	8
2	Great Britain	1	2	1	4
3	France	1	1	1	3
4	East Germany	1	0	4	5
5	Spain	1	0	0	1
6	West Germany	0	1	0	1
7	Italy	0	0	1	1
7	Netherlands	0	0	1	1
Totals (8 entries)		6	6	12	24
