= Thomas Hagmann =

Swiss judoka

Personal information
- Nationality: Swiss
- Born: 11 October 1953 (age 71)

Sport
- Sport: Judo

Thomas Hagmann (born 11 October 1953) is a Swiss judoka. He competed at the 1976 Summer Olympics and the 1980 Summer Olympics.
