= Raymond Neenan =

British judoka

Personal information
- Nationality: British
- Born: 7 September 1952 (age 72)

Sport
- Sport: Judo

Raymond Neenan (born 7 September 1952) is a British judoka. He competed in the men's half-lightweight event at the 1980 Summer Olympics. He became a two times champion of Great Britain, winning the featherweight category at the British Judo Championships in 1975 and 1976.
