= Vladimir Nevzorov =

Russian judoka (born 1952)

Personal information
- Born: 5 October 1952 (age 73)
- Occupation: Judoka

Sport
- Country: Soviet Union
- Sport: Judo
- Weight class: ‍–‍70 kg

Achievements and titles
- Olympic Games: (gold) (1976)
- World Champ.: (1975)
- European Champ.: (gold) (1975, 1977)
Medal record
Men's judo
Representing Soviet Union
Olympic Games
Gold medal – first place	1976 Montreal	‍–‍70 kg
World Championships
Gold medal – first place	1975 Vienna	‍–‍70 kg
European Championships
Gold medal – first place	1973 Madrid	Men's team
Gold medal – first place	1975 Lyon	‍–‍70 kg
Gold medal – first place	1977 Ludwigshafen	‍–‍71 kg
European Junior Championships
Gold medal – first place	1972 Leningrad	‍–‍70 kg
Bronze medal – third place	1971 Naples	‍–‍70 kg

Profile at external databases
- IJF: 8568
- JudoInside.com: 5861
- Updated on 21 June 2023

Vladimir Mikhaylovich Nevzorov (Russian: Владимир Михайлович Невзоров, born 5 October 1952 in Maykop) is a Russian judoka who competed for the Soviet Union at the 1976 Summer Olympics.

== Career ==
In 1975, Nevzorov won the gold medal at the World Judo Championships in Vienna in the half middleweight. The next year, he also won the Olympic gold medal in the same weight class.

In 1980 he became the coach of the Soviet national team. From 1989 to 1991 he worked in France for two years. In 1999 Nevzorov became head-coach of the Russian national judo team; a position he held until 2001. As such, he was the head coach of the Russian team at the 2000 Summer Olympics. Nevzorov later became vice-president of the Russian Judo federation.
