= Peter Adelaar =

Dutch judoka (1947–2004)

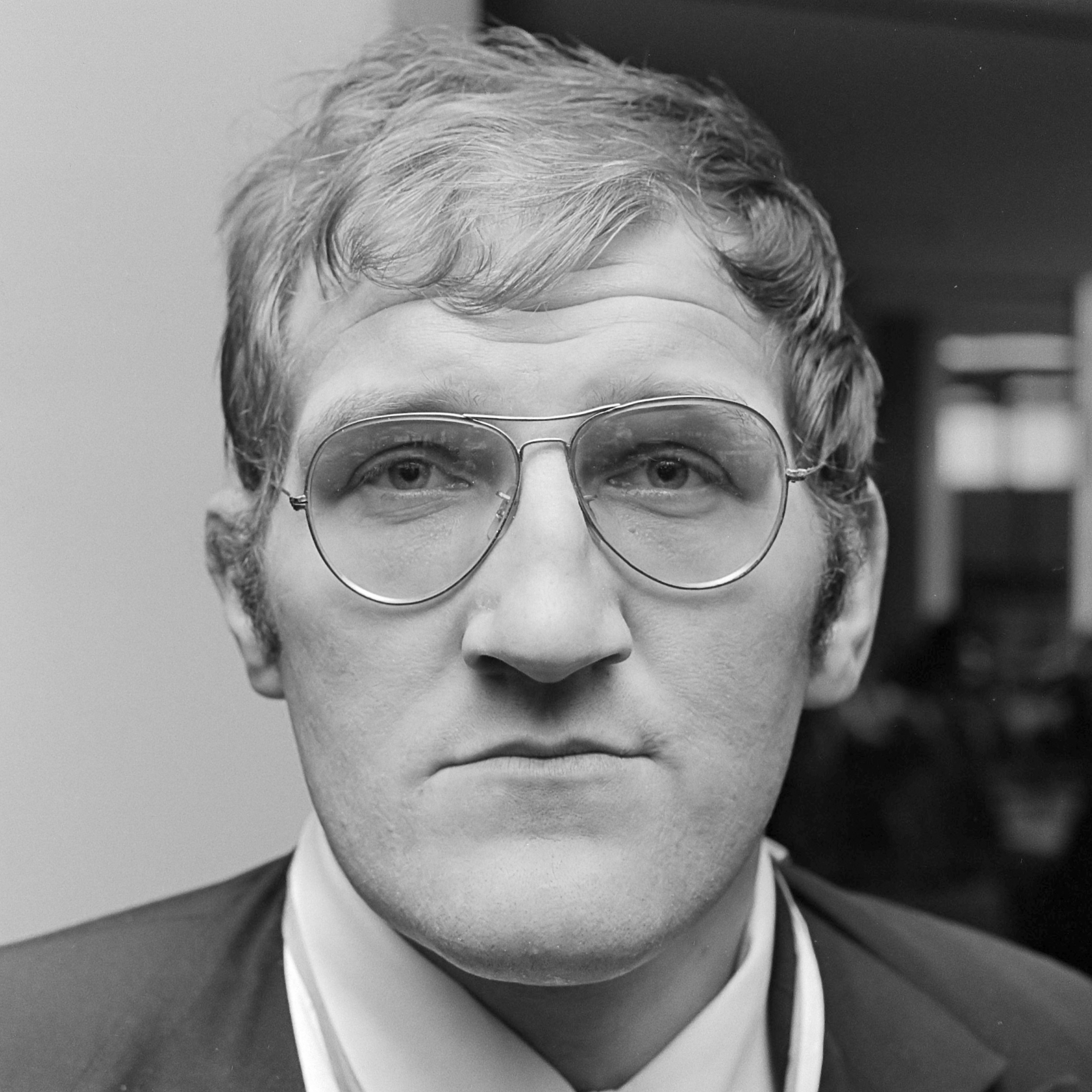
- Peter Adelaar in 1978

Personal information
- Born: 26 February 1947 Amsterdam, the Netherlands
- Died: 14 October 2004 (aged 57) Amsterdam, the Netherlands
- Height: 2.13 m (7 ft 0 in)
- Weight: 135 kg (298 lb)

Sport
- Sport: Judo
Medal record
Representing The Netherlands
European Championships
Gold medal – first place	1978 Helsinki	-95 kg
Bronze medal – third place	1973 Madrid	+93 kg
Bronze medal – third place	1975 Lyon	open
Bronze medal – third place	1977 Ludwigshafen	+95 kg
Bronze medal – third place	1979 Brussels	+95 kg
Bronze medal – third place	1980 Vienna	+95 kg

Peter Adelaar (26 February 1947 – 14 October 2004) was a Dutch judoka. Between 1973 and 1980 he won one gold and five bronze medals at European championships. He competed at the 1980 Summer Olympics in the heavyweight and open categories and finished in 10th and 15th place, respectively.
