= Waldemar Zausz =

Polish judoka

Personal information
- Nationality: Polish
- Born: 5 March 1952 (age 73); Wrocław, Poland

Sport
- Sport: Judo

Waldemar Zausz (born 5 March 1952) is a Polish judoka. He competed in the men's heavyweight event at the 1976 Summer Olympics.
