= Katsuhiko Kashiwazaki =

Japanese judoka (born 1951)

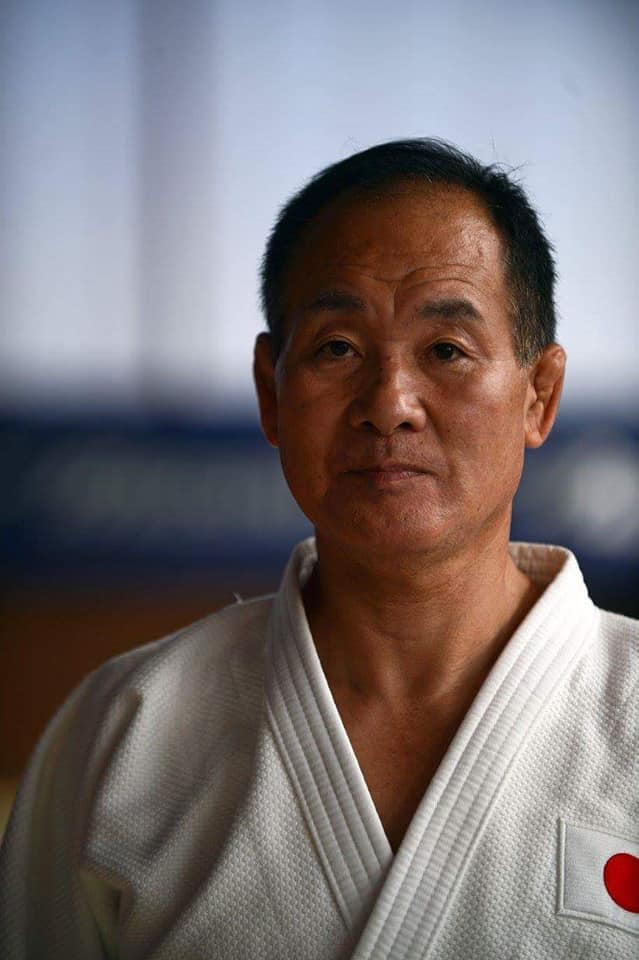

Personal information
- Native name: Japanese: 柏崎 克彦
- Born: 16 September 1951 (age 74) Kuji, Iwate, Japan
- Occupation: Judoka

Sport
- Sport: Judo
- Weight class: Featherweight (up to 65 kg)

Profile at external databases
- JudoInside.com: 5399

Katsuhiko Kashiwazaki
Medal record

Representing Japan

Men's Judo

World Championships
Gold medal – first place	1981 Maastricht	-65 kg
Silver medal – second place	1975 Vienna	-63 kg

Katsuhiko Kashiwazaki (Japanese: 柏 崎 克 彦; born 16 September 1951, Kuji, Iwate) – Japanese judoka, champion and medalist of championships Japan and the world, author of books and one of the leading judo specialists in the world.

== Biography ==
Katsuhiko Kashiwazaki began to practice judo at the age of 10. His first coach was the 5th dan master of Shotaro Kubo. While in high school and before entering Tokai University train the future champion became the master Yuto Wayama. While studying at the University of Tokyo, preparation Katsuhiko Kashiwazaki became a two-time world champion in judo (in 1967 and 1973) and three-time Japanese champion Nobuyuki Sato. Three teachers became an example for Katsuhiko Kashiwazaki. He later noted that Shotaro Kubo taught him the spirit of judo, Yuto Wayama passed on the basics of newaza, and Nobuyuki Sato was an example of perseverance for him.

Master Nobuyuki Sato's Style influenced Kashiwazaki's projection tendency through throws and newaza. Indeed, Isao Okano notes Sato sensei's ability use hikkikomi gaeshi before taking control of your opponent on the ground. According to Kashiwazaki, his teacher also received the nickname "Newaza Sato" in connection with his military equipment.

== Career ==
One of the first international achievements of Kashiwazaki was not in judo, but in sambo. He won a silver medal at the European Open in Riga in 1972 in the category up to 62 kg. Sato Sensei won the gold medal, whom Katsuhiko Kashiwazaki accompanied at the event. He soon won the SAMBO World Championship in 1975 in the same weight category. He performed in the featherweight category (up to 65 kg). Champion (1975 and 1978–1980), silver (1976) and bronze (1974, 1982) medalist of the Japanese championships. Winner and medalist of international tournaments. Winner (1982) and bronze medalist (1978) of the international tournament in memory of JKanō Jigorō in Tokyo. Silver medalist at the 1975 World Championship in Vienna. At the 1981 World Championships in Maastricht, he climbed to the highest step of the podium.

After Kashiwazaki completed his competition, he moved to London to teach at Budokwai. There he met and became friends with the famous photographer Terence Donovan, who trained in the club and with whom they later wrote the book Fighting judo. Katsuhiko Kashiwazaki was later the national judo coach in Canada, Germany and other countries. Since 2009, he became head coach at Budo International University in Japan.

=== Achievements ===
Year	Competition	Place	Result	Category
1975	World championship	Vienna	Silver	up to 63 kg
1981	World championship	Maastricht	Gold	up to 65 kg
1976	Tournoi de Paris	Paris	Bronze	up to 70 kg
1977	International tournament	Budapest	Gold	up to 65 kg
1978	International tournament	Budapest	Gold	up to 65 kg
1978	Jigoro Kano Cup	Tokyo	Bronze	up to 65 kg
1979	International tournament	Sancti Spiritus	Gold	up to 65 kg
1980	Pacific Rim Championship	Honolulu	Gold	up to 65 kg
1982	Jigoro Kano Cup	Tokyo	Gold	up to 65 kg

== Bibliography ==
Katsuhiko Kashivazaki is the author of several books on judo, most of which ("Osaekomi", "Tomoenage", "Shimewaza", "Martial Judo") emphasize his thirst for shots and ground technicians Kodokan Judo.

- Katsuhiko Kashiwazaki (1997), Osaekomi, Ippon USA, ISBN 9781874572367
- Katsuhiko Kashiwazaki (1992), Tomoe nage, Ippon Books, ISBN 9780951845578
- Katsuhiko Kashiwazaki (1992), Shimewaza, Ippon books, ISBN 9780951845530
- Katsuhiko Kashiwazaki, Hidetoshi Nakanishi (1992), Attacking Judo: A guide to combinations and counters, Ippon Books, ISBN 9780951845592
- Katsuhiko Kashiwazaki (1985), Fighting judo ISBN 9780720715941

He is also the author of the introduction to the book "JUDO NEWAZA of Koji Komuro KOMLOCK" by judoist Koji Komuro, dedicated to ground technicians.

== Links ==
- Katsuhiko Kashiwazaki
