= Said Achtar =

Syrian judoka

Personal information
- Nationality: Syrian
- Born: 28 May 1957 (age 67)

Sport
- Sport: Judo

Said Achtar (Arabic: سعيد عشتار; born 28 May 1957) is a Syrian judoka. He competed in the 1980 Summer Olympics.
