= Mihály Petrovszky =

Hungarian judoka (1950–2018)

Personal information
- Nationality: Hungarian
- Born: 26 December 1950; Békéscsaba, Hungary
- Died: 29 August 2018 (aged 67)
- Occupation: Judoka

Sport
- Sport: Judo

Profile at external databases
- JudoInside.com: 46859

Mihály Petrovszky (26 December 1950 – 29 August 2018) was a Hungarian judoka. He competed at the 1972 Summer Olympics and the 1976 Summer Olympics.
