= Oleg Zurabiani =

Georgian judoka

Personal information
- Nationality: Georgian
- Born: 15 May 1957 (age 67); Choluri, Georgia

Sport
- Sport: Judo

Oleg Zurabiani (born 15 May 1957) is a Georgian judoka. He competed in the men's lightweight event at the 1976 Summer Olympics, representing the Soviet Union.
