= Dambajavyn Tsend–Ayuush =

Mongolian judoka (born 1952)

Personal information
- Nationality: Mongolian
- Born: 15 May 1952 (age 72); Galt, Khövsgöl, Mongolia
- Occupation: Judoka

Sport
- Sport: Judo

Dambajavyn Tsend–Ayuush (born 15 May 1952) is a Mongolian judoka. He competed at the 1976 Summer Olympics and the 1980 Summer Olympics.
