= Vladimír Novák (judoka) =

Czech judoka

Personal information
- Nationality: Czech
- Born: 16 April 1948 Klatovy, Czechoslovakia
- Died: 12 October 2017 (aged 69)

Sport
- Sport: Judo

Vladimír Novák (16 April 1948 – 12 October 2017) was a Czech judoka. He competed in the men's heavyweight event at the 1976 Summer Olympics.
