= Károly Molnár (judoka) =

Hungarian judoka

Personal information
- Nationality: Hungarian
- Born: 22 July 1953 (age 72); Fábiánháza, Hungary

Sport
- Sport: Judo

Károly Molnár (born 22 July 1953) is a Hungarian judoka. He competed at the 1976 Summer Olympics and the 1980 Summer Olympics.
