= 1975 World Judo Championships =

Judo competition

Judo 1975 Men's World Judo Championships
- Venue: Wiener Stadthalle
- Location: Vienna, Austria
- Dates: 23–26 October 1975
- Competitors: 274 from 46 nations

Competition at external databases
- Links: IJF • JudoInside

The 1975 World Judo Championships were the ninth edition of the men's World Judo Championships, and were held in Vienna, Austria from 23–26 October 1975.

== Medal overview ==
=== Men ===
Event	Gold	Silver	Bronze
-63 kg	(Japan) Yoshiharu Minami	(Japan) Katsuhiko Kashiwazaki	(Italy) Felice Mariani (East Germany) Torsten Reissmann
-70 kg	(Soviet Union) Vladimir Nevzorov	(Soviet Union) Valery Dvoinikov	(Japan) Katsunori Akimoto (Japan) Koji Kuramoto
-80 kg	(Japan) Shozo Fujii	(Japan) Yoshimi Hara	(Poland) Adam Adamczyk (France) Jean-Paul Coche
-93 kg	(France) Jean-Luc Rougé	(Japan) Michinori Ishibashi	(Soviet Union) Viktor Betanov (Soviet Union) Ramaz Kharshiladze
+93 kg	(Japan) Sumio Endo	(Soviet Union) Sergei Novikov	(North Korea) Gil-Jong Pak (Japan) Chonosuke Takagi
Open	(Japan) Haruki Uemura	(Japan) Kazuhiro Ninomiya	(Soviet Union) Shota Chochishvili (East Germany) Dietmar Lorenz

=== Medal table ===
Rank	Nation	Gold	Silver	Bronze	Total
1	Japan (JPN)	4	4	3	11
2	Soviet Union (URS)	1	2	3	6
3	France (FRA)	1	0	1	2
4	East Germany (GDR)	0	0	2	2
5	Italy (ITA)	0	0	1	1
5	North Korea (PRK)	0	0	1	1
5	Poland (POL)	0	0	1	1
Totals (7 entries)		6	6	12	24
