= Wolfgang Biedron =

Swedish judoka

Personal information
- Nationality: Swedish
- Born: 11 June 1951 (age 73); Hohenfels, Germany
- Occupation: Judoka

Sport
- Sport: Judo

Profile at external databases
- JudoInside.com: 6118

Wolfgang Biedron (born 11 June 1951) is a Swedish judoka. He competed in the men's half-lightweight event at the 1980 Summer Olympics.
