= Abdoulaye Kote =

Senegalese judoka (born 1955)

Personal information
- Nationality: Senegalese
- Born: 25 March 1955 (age 70)

Sport
- Sport: Judo

Abdoulaye Kote (born 25 March 1955) is a Senegalese judoka. He competed at the 1976 Summer Olympics and the 1980 Summer Olympics.
