= Markku Airio =

Finnish judoka (born 1952)

Personal information
- Nationality: Finnish
- Born: 25 April 1952 (age 73) Helsinki, Finland
- Occupation: Judoka

Sport
- Sport: Judo

Profile at external databases
- JudoInside.com: 22299

Markku Airio (born 25 April 1952) is a Finnish judoka.

== Career ==
He competed in the men's heavyweight event at the 1976 Summer Olympics.
