= Rémi Berthet =

French judoka

Personal information
- Nationality: French
- Born: 31 October 1947 (age 79)

Sport
- Sport: Judo

Rémi Berthet (born 31 October 1947) is a French judoka. He competed in the men's heavyweight event at the 1976 Summer Olympics.
