= Ramaz Kharshiladze =

Georgian judoka (1951–2017)

Personal information
- Born: 16 January 1951
- Died: 11 September 2017 (aged 66)
- Occupation: Judoka

Sport
- Country: Soviet Union
- Sport: Judo
- Weight class: ‍–‍93 kg, ‍–‍95 kg

Achievements and titles
- Olympic Games: (silver) (1976)
- World Champ.: (bronze) (1975)
- European Champ.: (bronze) (1980)
Medal record
Men's judo
Representing Soviet Union
Olympic Games
Silver medal – second place	1976 Montreal	‍–‍93 kg
World Championships
Bronze medal – third place	1975 Vienna	‍–‍93 kg
European Championships
Bronze medal – third place	1980 Vienna	‍–‍95 kg
European Junior Championships
Silver medal – second place	1971 Naples	‍–‍80 kg

Profile at external databases
- IJF: 54407
- JudoInside.com: 37843
- Updated on 21 June 2023

Ramaz Kharshiladze (16 January 1951, Nazargora, Khashuri District – 12 September 2017, Khashuri) was a Georgian judoka and sambo wrestler who competed for the Soviet Union. He was awarded the title of Merited Master of Sports of the USSR.

== Early life ==
Ramaz Kharshiladze was born on 16 January 1951 in Nazargora, Khashuri District, Georgian SSR. He began practicing judo and sambo at an early age and quickly emerged as one of the leading athletes in Soviet combat sports.

== Sports career ==
=== Olympic Games and World Championships ===
Kharshiladze won a silver medal at the 1976 Summer Olympics in Montreal in the 93 kg weight category. In the same year, he also became a silver medalist at the World Judo Championships. He had previously won a bronze medal at the World Championships in 1975.

=== European Championships ===
At the European level, Kharshiladze achieved significant success. He became European Champion in 1975 and won a silver medal in 1976 in team competitions. In 1980, he earned a bronze medal in the individual weight category.

== Awards and honors ==
Kharshiladze was a six-time winner of the Tbilisi International Judo Tournament, a record that remains unbeaten. He was a ten-time champion of the Soviet Union in judo (1974, 1976, 1979, 1980) and a two-time Soviet Union champion in sambo (1971, 1973).

He was also a two-time champion of the VI and VII Spartakiads of the Peoples of the USSR (1975, 1979), a three-time winner of the USSR Cup, and the winner of 15 international tournaments.

For his outstanding contributions to sport, Kharshiladze was awarded the Order of Honor of Georgia (No. 04144) by decree of the President of Georgia on 21 June 2005.
