= Fahad Al-Farhan (judoka) =

Kuwaiti judoka

Personal information
- Nationality: Kuwaiti
- Born: 1 January 1955 (age 71)

Sport
- Sport: Judo

Fahad Al-Farhan (born 1 January 1955) is a Kuwaiti judoka. He competed at the 1976 Summer Olympics and the 1980 Summer Olympics.

Al-Farhan was in 1976 among the first Judoka that represented Kuwait at the Olympics.
