= Patrick Vial =

French judoka (born 1946)

Personal information
- Born: 24 December 1946 (age 79)
- Occupation: Judoka

Sport
- Country: France
- Sport: Judo
- Weight class: ‍–‍70 kg

Achievements and titles
- Olympic Games: (bronze) (1976)
- World Champ.: 5th (1973)
- European Champ.: (bronze) (1969)
Medal record
Men's judo
Representing France
Olympic Games
Bronze medal – third place	1976 Montreal	‍–‍70 kg
European Championships
Bronze medal – third place	1969 Oostende	‍–‍70 kg

Profile at external databases
- IJF: 2330
- JudoInside.com: 5256
- Updated on 21 June 2023

Patrick Vial (born 24 December 1946 in Paris) is a French judoka and Olympic medalist. He won a bronze medal at the 1976 Summer Olympics in Montreal.
