= Judo at the 1976 Summer Olympics =

Judo Judo at the Games of the XXI Olympiad
- Venue: Olympic Velodrome
- Location: Montreal, Quebec, Canada
- Dates: 26–31 July 1976
- Competitors: 131 from 46 nations

Competition at external databases
- Links: IJF • JudoInside

At the judo competition at the 1976 Summer Olympics, medals were awarded in five weight classes and in the open competition, and was restricted to male judoka only.

== Medal summary ==
Games	Gold	Silver	Bronze
Lightweight; 63 kg	Héctor Rodríguez; Cuba	Chang Eun-kyung; South Korea	Felice Mariani; Italy József Tuncsik; Hungary
Half middleweight 70 kg	Vladimir Nevzorov; Soviet Union	Koji Kuramoto; Japan	Marian Tałaj; Poland Patrick Vial; France
Middleweight; 80 kg	Isamu Sonoda; Japan	Valeriy Dvoynikov; Soviet Union	Slavko Obadov; Yugoslavia Park Young-chul; South Korea
Half heavyweight 93 kg	Kazuhiro Ninomiya; Japan	Ramaz Kharshiladze; Soviet Union	Jürg Röthlisberger; Switzerland David Starbrook; Great Britain
Heavyweight +93 kg	Sergei Novikov; Soviet Union	Günther Neureuther; West Germany	Allen Coage; United States Sumio Endo; Japan
Open category	Haruki Uemura; Japan	Keith Remfry; Great Britain	Cho Jea-ki; South Korea Shota Chochishvili; Soviet Union

== Participating nations ==
- Argentina (2)
- Australia (3)
- Austria (4)
- Belgium (2)
- Brazil (3)
- Bulgaria (4)
- Canada (5)
- Cuba (2)
- Czechoslovakia (1)
- East Germany (3)
- Ecuador (2)
- Finland (1)
- France (5)
- Great Britain (5)
- Hong Kong (1)
- Hungary (6)
- Iceland (2)
- Israel (1)
- Italy (3)
- Japan (6)
- Kuwait (4)
- Lebanon (1)
- Liechtenstein (3)
- Mexico (1)
- Mongolia (5)
- Netherlands Antilles (2)
- Nicaragua (1)
- North Korea (3)
- Panama (1)
- Poland (5)
- Portugal (2)
- Puerto Rico (5)
- Senegal (5)
- Singapore (1)
- South Korea (4)
- Soviet Union (6)
- Spain (2)
- Suriname (1)
- Sweden (1)
- Switzerland (2)
- Thailand (1)
- Turkey (3)
- United States (5)
- Venezuela (2)
- West Germany (4)
- Yugoslavia (4)

== Medal table ==
Rank	Nation	Gold	Silver	Bronze	Total
1	Japan	3	1	1	5
2	Soviet Union	2	2	1	5
3	Cuba	1	0	0	1
4	South Korea	0	1	2	3
5	Great Britain	0	1	1	2
6	West Germany	0	1	0	1
7	France	0	0	1	1
7	Hungary	0	0	1	1
7	Italy	0	0	1	1
7	Poland	0	0	1	1
7	Switzerland	0	0	1	1
7	United States	0	0	1	1
7	Yugoslavia	0	0	1	1
Totals (13 entries)		6	6	12	24

== See also ==
- Sachio Ashida – Judo coach for the United States
