= Torsten Reißmann =

German judoka

Personal information
- Born: 23 February 1956
- Died: 8 October 2009 (aged 53)
- Occupation: Judoka

Sport
- Sport: Judo
Medal record
Representing East Germany
Men's Judo
World Championships
Bronze medal – third place	1975 Vienna	-63 kg

Profile at external databases
- IJF: 54217
- JudoInside.com: 5626

Torsten Reißmann (born 23 February 1956 in Potsdam – 8 October 2009) was an East German judoka who competed in the late 1970s and the early 1980s. At the 1980 Summer Olympics in Moscow, he finished fifth in the half-lightweight event.
