= Yves Delvingt =

French judoka

Personal information
- Nationality: French
- Born: 8 February 1953 (age 72)

Sport
- Sport: Judo

Yves Delvingt (born 8 February 1953) is a French judoka. He competed at the 1976 Summer Olympics and the 1980 Summer Olympics.
