= Judo at the 1984 Summer Olympics – Men's open category =

Judo at the Olympics

Men's open category at the Games of the XXIII Olympiad
- Venue: California State University, Los Angeles
- Date: 11 August 1984
- Competitors: 15 from 15 nations

Medalists
1st place, gold medalist(s)		Yasuhiro Yamashita	Japan
2nd place, silver medalist(s)		Mohamed Ali Rashwan	Egypt
3rd place, bronze medalist(s)		Mihai Cioc	Romania
3rd place, bronze medalist(s)		Arthur Schnabel	West Germany

The men's open category competition in judo at the 1984 Summer Olympics in Los Angeles was held on 11 August at the California State University. The gold medal was won by Yasuhiro Yamashita of Japan.

In his only appearance at the Olympics, four-time world champion Yasuhiro Yamashita tore a right calf muscle in the preliminary match against Arthur Schnabel. This put Yamashita at a huge disadvantage since he executed his throws by pivoting on his right leg. Though he managed to win the match with an Okuri-Eri-Jime, the injury caused him to visibly limp during the semi-final match against Laurent Del Colombo. Yamashita was thrown with an Osoto Gari only 30 seconds into the match, but managed to return an Osoto Gari and won the match with a Yoko-Shiho-Gatame (side four-quarter hold). He played the final match against Mohamed Ali Rashwan of Egypt. Yamashita won the final and the gold medal despite his injury. The match witnessed a remarkable fair play act from Rashwan who did not aim for Yamashita's right leg. Rashwan was even given an award from the International Fairplay Committee.

== Results ==
=== Pool A ===
Round of 16		Quarterfinal		Semifinal
Bechir Kiiari (TUN)	R
Mohamed Ali Rashwan (EGY)	IPO	Mohamed Ali Rashwan (EGY)	IPO
Juha Salonen (FIN)	E	Mihai Cioc (ROU)	R
Mihai Cioc (ROU)	IPO			Mohamed Ali Rashwan (EGY)	IPO
Clemens Jehle (SUI)	E			Xu Guoqing (CHN)	R
Xu Guoqing (CHN)	YUK	Xu Guoqing (CHN)	WAZ
Fred Blaney (CAN)	YUS	Fred Blaney (CAN)	E
Dewey Mitchell (USA)	E

=== Pool B ===
Round of 16		Quarterfinal		Semifinal
Lansana Coly (SEN)	R
Yasuhiro Yamashita (JPN)	IPO	Yasuhiro Yamashita (JPN)	IPO
Arthur Schnabel (FRG)	YUS	Arthur Schnabel (FRG)	R
Paul Radburn (GBR)	E			Yasuhiro Yamashita (JPN)	WIP
Kolbeinn Gíslason (ISL)	E			Laurent del Colombo (FRA)	R
Laurent del Colombo (FRA)	SOG	Laurent del Colombo (FRA)	YUS
		Kim Gwan-hyeon (KOR)	E

=== Repechages ===
Repechage	Repechage semifinal		Repechage final
	Bechir Kiiari (TUN)	E
	Mihai Cioc (ROU)	IPO
			Mihai Cioc (ROU)	IPO (bronze)
			Xu Guoqing (CHN)	E

Repechage	Repechage semifinal		Repechage final
	Lansana Coly (SEN)	E
	Arthur Schnabel (FRG)	IPO
			Arthur Schnabel (FRG)	YUS (bronze)
			Laurent del Colombo (FRA)	E

=== Final ===
Final
Mohamed Ali Rashwan (EGY)	2nd place, silver medalist(s)
Yasuhiro Yamashita (JPN)	IPO (gold)

== Final classification ==
Rank	Name	Country
1st place, gold medalist(s)	Yasuhiro Yamashita	Japan
2nd place, silver medalist(s)	Mohamed Ali Rashwan	Egypt
3rd place, bronze medalist(s)	Mihai Cioc	Romania
3rd place, bronze medalist(s)	Arthur Schnabel	West Germany
5T	Laurent del Colombo	France
5T	Xu Guoqing	China
7T	Lansana Coly	Senegal
7T	Bechir Kiiari	Tunisia
9T	Fred Blaney	Canada
9T	Kim Gwan-hyeon	South Korea
11T	Juha Salonen	Finland
11T	Clemens Jehle	Switzerland
11T	Dewey Mitchell	United States
11T	Paul Radburn	Great Britain
11T	Kolbeinn Gíslason	Iceland
