= Syria at the 1980 Summer Olympics =

- IOC code: SYR
- NOC: Syrian Olympic Committee
- Website: www.syriaolymp.org (in Arabic and English)

in Moscow
- Competitors: 67 (65 men and 2 women) in 7 sports
- Flag bearer: Jihad Naim
- Medals: Gold 0 Silver 0 Bronze 0 Total 0

Summer Olympics appearances (overview)
- 1948; 1952–1964; 1968; 1972; 1976; 1980; 1984; 1988; 1992; 1996; 2000; 2004; 2008; 2012; 2016; 2020; 2024

Other related appearances
- United Arab Republic (1960)

Syria competed at the 1980 Summer Olympics in Moscow, USSR. The country returned to the Olympic Games after missing the 1976 Summer Olympics in Montreal. The youngest participant was the wrestler Mohamed Moutei Nakdali, the oldest was the sports shooter Adnan Houjeij. The Syrian team did not win any medals.

== Competitors ==
The following is the list of number of competitors in the Games.

Sport	Men	Women	Total
Athletics	10	2	12
Boxing	8	0	8
Football	15	0	15
Judo	7	0	7
Shooting	4	0	4
Weightlifting	4	0	4
Wrestling	17	0	17
Total	65	2	67

== Athletics ==
Key

- Note–Ranks given for track events are within the athlete's heat only
- Q = Qualified for the next round
- q = Qualified for the next round as a fastest loser or, in field events, by position without achieving the qualifying target
- NR = National record
- N/A = Round not applicable for the event
- Bye = Athlete not required to compete in round

Men
Track events

Athlete	Event	Qualification		Quarterfinal		Semifinal		Final	
Athlete	Event	Result	Position	Result	Position	Result	Position	Result	Position
Nabil Nahri	100 m	10.67	5	Did not advance					
Nabil Nahri	200 m	22.14	5	Did not advance					
Mohamed El-Abed	400 m	50.47	5	Did not advance					
Mohamed Makhlouf	800 m	1:52.3	6	Did not advance					
Mohamed Makhlouf	1500 m	4:00.4	10	Did not advance					
Saleh El-Ali	5000 m	15:08.2	12	Did not advance					
Akel Hamdan	10,000 m	31:21.9	9	Did not advance					
Maher Hreitani	110 m hurdles	15.45	7	Did not advance					
Amer Maaraoui	400 m hurdles	53.26	7	Did not advance					
Abdul Karim Joumaa	3,000 m steeplechase	9:29.4	10	Did not advance					

Field events

Athlete	Event	Qualification		Final	
Athlete	Event	Result	Position	Result	Position
Ahmad Balkis	High jump	2.05	29	Did not advance	
Adnan Houry	Discus throw	47.52	16	Did not advance	

Women
Track events

Athlete	Event	Qualification		Quarterfinal		Semifinal		Final	
Athlete	Event	Result	Position	Result	Position	Result	Position	Result	Position
Hala El-Moughrabi	800 m	2:17.6	6	Did not advance					
Hala El-Moughrabi	1500 m	DNS		Did not advance					

Field events

Athlete	Event	Qualification		Final	
Athlete	Event	Result	Position	Result	Position
Dia Toutinji	Long jump	DNS		Did not advance	
Dia Toutinji	High jump	NM		Did not advance	

== Boxing ==
Men

Athlete	Event	First round	Second round	Third round	Quarterfinals	Semifinals	Final	
Athlete	Event	Opposition Result	Opposition Result	Opposition Result	Opposition Result	Opposition Result	Opposition Result	Rank
Adel Hammoude	Light Flyweight	Künzler (ROU); L TKO	Did not advance					
Talal Elchawa	Flyweight	Mlundwa (TAN); L 0-5	Did not advance					
Fayez Zaghloul	Bantamweight	BYE	Ouphaphone (LAO); W 5-0	Anthony (GUY); L 2-3	Did not advance			
Nidal Haddad	Featherweight	González (MEX); L 0-5	Did not advance					
Farez Halabi	Light-Welterweight	Kampanath (LAO); W 3-2	Oliva (ITA); L TKO	Did not advance				
Mohamed Ali El-Dahan	Welterweight	Krüger (GDR); L 0-5	Did not advance					
Imad Idriss	Light-Middleweight	BYE	Njunwa (TAN); L DSQ	Did not advance				
Naasan Ajjoub	Heavyweight	Stoimenov (BUL); L TKO	Did not advance					

== Football ==
=== First round ===
==== Group C ====
Team	Pld	W	D	L	GF	GA	GD	Pts
East Germany	3	2	1	0	7	1	+6	5
Algeria	3	1	1	1	4	2	+2	3
Spain	3	0	3	0	2	2	0	3
Syria	3	0	1	2	0	8	−8	1

July 20, 1980
12:00

Algeria	3 – 0	Syria
Belloumi 36'; Madjer 48'; Merzekane 73' (p.k.)	Report

Dinamo Stadium, Minsk
Referee: Vojtech Christov (Czechoslovakia)

July 22, 1980
12:00

Spain	0 – 0	Syria
	Report

Dinamo Stadium, Minsk
Referee: José Castro Lozada (Venezuela)

July 24, 1980
12:00

East Germany	5 – 0	Syria
Hause 6'; Netz 25' 45'; Peter 75'; Terletzki 82'	Report

Republican Stadium, Kiev
Attendance: 80,000
Referee: Ulf Eriksson (Sweden)

== Judo ==
Men

Athlete	Event	Round 1	Round 2	Round 3	Round 4	Repechage 1	Repechage 2	Final / BM	
Athlete	Event	Opposition Result	Opposition Result	Opposition Result	Opposition Result	Opposition Result	Opposition Result	Opposition Result	Rank
Samir El-Najjar	−60kg	Charles Chibwe (ZAM); W 1000-0000	José Rodríguez (CUB); L 0000-1000	Did not advance		Naji Keyrouz (LIB); W 1000-0000	John Holliday (GBR); L 0000-1000	Did not advance	7
Bassam El-Jabbin	−78kg	Ignacio San Paz (ESP); L 0000-1000	Did not advance						
Elias Kobti	−95kg	Dietmar Lorenz (GDR); L 0000-1000	Did not advance						
Said Achtar	Open	—N/a	BYE	Franz Berger (AUT); L 0000-1000	Did not advance				

== Shooting ==
Open

Diver	Event	Final	
Diver	Event	Result	Rank
Khalil Arbaji	Skeet	172	46
Adnan Houjeij	Trap	181	26
Jihad Naim	Skeet	176	45
Nidal Nasser	Trap	178	29

== Weightlifting ==
Men

Athlete	Event	Snatch		Clean & jerk		Total	Rank
Athlete	Event	Result	Rank	Result	Rank	Total	Rank
Imade Kadro	−52 kg	85	15	105	15	190	14
Faouaz Nadirin	−60 kg	102.5	13	127.5	13	230	13
Salem Ajjoub	−82.5 kg	127.5	16	175	12	302.5	14
Talal Najjar	−110 kg	157.5	9	205	8	362.5	8
