= Judo at the 1988 Summer Olympics – Men's +95 kg =

Judo at the Olympics

Men's +95 kg at the Games of the XXIV Olympiad
- Venue: Jangchung Gymnasium
- Date: 1 October 1988
- Competitors: 26 from 26 nations

Medalists
1st place, gold medalist(s)		Hitoshi Saito	Japan
2nd place, silver medalist(s)		Henry Stöhr	East Germany
3rd place, bronze medalist(s)		Cho Yong-chul	South Korea
3rd place, bronze medalist(s)		Grigory Verichev	Soviet Union

The men's +95 kg competition in judo at the 1988 Summer Olympics in Seoul was held on 1 October at the Jangchung Gymnasium. The gold medal was won by Hitoshi Saito of Japan.

== Results ==
=== Pool A ===
Round of 32
Dimitar Zapryanov (BUL)	KOK
Roger Vachon (FRA)	E
Hitoshi Saito (JPN)	IPO
Lansana Coly (SEN)	R
L. Portelli (ARG)	DNS
Mohamed Ali Rashwan (EGY)	WO
Alexander von der Groeben (FRG)	E
Cho Yong-chul (KOR)	IPO
Stefano Venturelli (ITA)	IPO
Boualem Miloudi (ALG)	E
Andrzej Basik (POL)	KOK
Clemens Jehle (SUI)	E

Round of 16
Dimitar Zapryanov (BUL)	R
Hitoshi Saito (JPN)	IPO
Mohamed Ali Rashwan (EGY)	IPO
Sigurður Bergmann (ISL)	E
Cho Yong-chul (KOR)	WAZ
Stefano Venturelli (ITA)	E
Andrzej Basik (POL)	WIP
Helder de Carvalho (ANG)	R

Quarterfinal
Hitoshi Saito (JPN)	IPO
Mohamed Ali Rashwan (EGY)	R
Cho Yong-chul (KOR)	YUK
Andrzej Basik (POL)	E

Semifinal
Hitoshi Saito (JPN)	CHU
Cho Yong-chul (KOR)	R

=== Pool B ===
Round of 32
Juha Salonen (FIN)	YUK
Xu Guoqing (CHN)	E
Steven Cohen (USA)	WAZ
Ricardo Blas (GUM)	E
Henry Stöhr (GDR)	IPO
Benjamin McMurray (PHI)	R
Grigory Verichev (URS)	WAZ
Dragomir Kusmuk (YUG)	E
Abderrahim Lahcinia (MAR)	E
Frederico Flexa (BRA)	IPO

Round of 16
Juha Salonen (FIN)	YUS
Steven Cohen (USA)	E
Henry Stöhr (GDR)	IPO
István Dubrovszky (HUN)	R
Grigory Verichev (URS)	WIP
Badmaanyambuugiin Bat-Erdene (MGL)	E
Frederico Flexa (BRA)	IPO
Elvis Gordon (GBR)	E

Quarterfinal
Juha Salonen (FIN)	R
Henry Stöhr (GDR)	IPO
Grigory Verichev (URS)	YUS
Frederico Flexa (BRA)	E

Semifinal
Henry Stöhr (GDR)	YUS
Grigory Verichev (URS)	R

=== Repechages ===
Repechage quarterfinal		Repechage semifinal		Repechage final
Lansana Coly (SEN)	E
Dimitar Zapryanov (BUL)	IPO	Dimitar Zapryanov (BUL)	YUS
		Mohamed Ali Rashwan (EGY)	E
				Dimitar Zapryanov (BUL)	E
				Cho Yong-chul (KOR)	SHI (bronze)

Repechage quarterfinal		Repechage semifinal		Repechage final
Benjamin McMurray (PHI)	E
István Dubrovszky (HUN)	IPO	István Dubrovszky (HUN)	CHU
		Juha Salonen (FIN)	E
				István Dubrovszky (HUN)	E
				Grigory Verichev (URS)	YUK (bronze)

=== Final ===
Final
Hitoshi Saito (JPN)	KEI (gold)
Henry Stöhr (GDR)	2nd place, silver medalist(s)

== Final classification ==
Rank	Name	Country
1	Hitoshi Saito	Japan
2	Henry Stöhr	East Germany
3T	Cho Yong-chul	South Korea
3T	Grigory Verichev	Soviet Union
5T	István Dubrovszky	Hungary
5T	Dimitar Zapryanov	Bulgaria
7T	Mohamed Ali Rashwan	Egypt
7T	Juha Salonen	Finland
9T	Lansana Coly	Senegal
9T	Benjamin McMurray	Philippines
11T	Andrzej Basik	Poland
11T	Frederico Flexa	Brazil
13T	Badmaanyambuugiin Bat-Erdene	Mongolia
13T	Sigurður Bergmann	Iceland
13T	Stefano Venturelli	Italy
13T	Helder de Carvalho	Angola
13T	Steven Cohen	United States
13T	Elvis Gordon	Great Britain
19T	Roger Vachon	France
19T	Dragomir Kusmuk	Yugoslavia
19T	Alexander von der Groeben	West Germany
19T	Boualem Miloudi	Algeria
19T	Clemens Jehle	Switzerland
19T	Xu Guoqing	China
19T	Ricardo Blas	Guam
19T	Abderrahim Lahcinia	Morocco
