= 1981 European Judo Championships =

1981 Judo European Judo Championships
- Location: Debrecen, Hungary
- Dates: 14–17 May 1981

Competition at external databases
- Links: JudoInside

The 1981 European Judo Championships were the 30th edition of the European Judo Championships, and were held in Debrecen, Hungary from 14 to 17 May 1981.

== Medal overview ==
=== Men ===
Event	Gold	Silver	Bronze
60 kg	(Poland) Andrzej Dziemianiuk	(Romania) Arpad Szabo	(France) Eric Maurel (Czechoslovakia) Pavel Petřikov
65 kg	(Romania) Constantin Niculae	(France) Thierry Rey	(Austria) Josef Reiter (Spain) Sergio Cardell
71 kg	(East Germany) Karl-Heinz Lehmann	(Hungary) Sándor Nagysolymosi	(Bulgaria) Iliyan Nedkov (Romania) Simion Toplicean
78 kg	(Bulgaria) Georghi Petrov	(Czechoslovakia) Roman Novotny	(Poland) Andrzej Sądej (Soviet Union) Shota Khabareli
86 kg	(Soviet Union) David Bodaveli	(France) Bernard Choullouyan	(West Germany) Wolfgang Frank (Hungary) János Gyáni
95 kg	(France) Roger Vachon	(Soviet Union) Tengiz Khubuluri	(Belgium) Robert Van de Walle (East Germany) Ulf Rettig
95+ kg	(Soviet Union) Grigory Verichev	(Bulgaria) Dimitar Zapryanov	(West Germany) Alexander Von der Groeben (France) Laurent Del Colombo
Open class	(Poland) Wojciech Reszko	(Netherlands) Willy Wilhelm	(West Germany) Arthur Schnabel (Hungary) András Oszvár

=== Medal table ===
Rank	Nation	Gold	Silver	Bronze	Total
1	Soviet Union (URS)	2	1	1	4
2	Poland (POL)	2	0	1	3
3	France (FRA)	1	2	2	5
4	Bulgaria (BUL)	1	1	1	3
5	East Germany (DDR)	1	0	1	2
5	Romania (ROU)	1	0	1	2
7	Hungary (HUN)	0	2	2	4
8	Czechoslovakia (TCH)	0	1	1	2
9	Netherlands (NED)	0	1	0	1
10	West Germany (FRG)	0	0	3	3
11	Austria (AUT)	0	0	1	1
11	Belgium (BEL)	0	0	1	1
11	Spain (ESP)	0	0	1	1
Totals (13 entries)		8	8	16	32

== Results overview ==
=== Men ===
==== 60 kg ====
Position	Judoka	Country
1.	Andrzej Dziemianiuk	Poland
2.	Arpad Szabo	Hungary
3.	Eric Maurel	France
3.	Pavel Petřikov	Czechoslovakia
5.	Tibor Kincses	Hungary
5.	Mikhail Morgalev	Soviet Union

==== 65 kg ====
Position	Judoka	Country
1.	Constantin Niculae	Romania
2.	Thierry Rey	France
3.	Josef Reiter	Austria
3.	Sergio Cardell	Spain
5.	Nickolay Solodukhin	Soviet Union
5.	Ferenc Kollar	Hungary

==== 71 kg ====
Position	Judoka	Country
1.	Karl-Heinz Lehmann	East Germany
2.	Sándor Nagysolymosi	Hungary
3.	Iliyan Nedkov	Bulgaria
3.	Simion Toplicean	Romania
5.	Stanislav Tuma	Czechoslovakia
5.	Willi Mueller	West Germany

==== 78 kg ====
Position	Judoka	Country
1.	Georghi Petrov	Bulgaria
2.	Roman Novotny	Czechoslovakia
3.	Andrzej Sądej	Poland
3.	Shota Khabareli	Soviet Union
5.	Neil Adams	Great Britain
5.	Michel Nowak	France

==== 86 kg ====
Position	Judoka	Country
1.	David Bodaveli	Soviet Union
2.	Bernard Choullouyan	France
3.	Wolfgang Frank	West Germany
3.	János Gyáni	Hungary
5.	Krzysztof Kurczyna	Poland
5.	Leo van Oosten	Netherlands

==== 95 kg ====
Position	Judoka	Country
1.	Roger Vachon	France
2.	Tengiz Khubuluri	Soviet Union
3.	Robert Van de Walle	Belgium
3.	Ulf Rettig	East Germany
5.	Zbigniew Bielawski	Poland
5.	Mark Chittenden	Great Britain

==== 95+ kg ====
Position	Judoka	Country
1.	Grigory Verichev	Soviet Union
2.	Dimitar Zapryanov	Bulgaria
3.	Alexander Von der Groeben	West Germany
3.	Laurent Del Colombo	France
5.	Fred Olhorn	East Germany
5.	Clemens Jehle	Switzerland

==== Open class ====
Position	Judoka	Country
1.	Wojciech Reszko	Poland
2.	Willy Wilhelm	Netherlands
3.	Arthur Schnabel	West Germany
3.	Andras Oszvar	Hungary
5.	Robert Van de Walle	Belgium
5.	Vladimir Kocman	Czechoslovakia
