= Portugal at the 1980 Summer Olympics =

- Flag of the Olympic Committee of Portugal
- IOC code: POR
- NOC: Olympic Committee of Portugal

in Moscow
- Competitors: 11 in 6 sports
- Flag bearer: Esbela da Fonseca (Gymnastics)
- Medals: Gold 0 Silver 0 Bronze 0 Total 0

Summer Olympics appearances (overview)
- 1912; 1920; 1924; 1928; 1932; 1936; 1948; 1952; 1956; 1960; 1964; 1968; 1972; 1976; 1980; 1984; 1988; 1992; 1996; 2000; 2004; 2008; 2012; 2016; 2020; 2024

Portugal competed at the 1980 Summer Olympics in Moscow, USSR.

Portugal sent a delegation of eleven competitors. These participated in six sports, with a debut in boxing, however no medals were won.

== Results by event ==
=== Athletics ===
Men's 1,500 metres

- João José Pontes Campos

- Round 1 (heat 2) — 3:41.3 (→ 5th)
- Semi-final (heat 1) — 3:44.4 (→ 7th, did not advance)

Men's 3,000 metres Steeplechase

- José Manuel Sena

- Round 1 (heat 3) — did not finish

Men's Marathon

- Anacleto Pereira Pinto

- Final — 2:17:04 (→ 16th place)

=== Boxing ===
Men's Light Flyweight (–48 kg):

- João Manuel Miguel (a.k.a. Paquito)

- 1/16 final — Bye
- 1/8 final — Shamil Sabirov (URS) (→ lost 5:0, did not advance)

=== Gymnastics ===
Women's Team All-Round Competition:

- Maria Avelina Alvarez — 69,00 pts (→ 9th – 16th)

Subdivision 1
Exercises	C	O	Total
Vault	8,85	8,65	17,50
Uneven Bars	8,85	8,05	16,90
Balance Beam	8,90	8,90	17,80
Floor	8,75	8,05	16,80
Total	35,35	33,65	69,00
Notes: C – compulsory; O – optional

=== Judo ===
Men's –60 kg:

- João Paulo Mendonça

Pool B:
- Round 1 — Marian Donat (POL) (→ won by waza-ari)
- Round 2 — Thierry Rey (FRA) (→ lost by ippon)
- Repêchage — Reino Fagerlund (FIN) (→ lost by koka, did not advance)

Men's Half Lightweight (–65 kg):

- José António Branco

Pool A:
- Round 1 — Abdoulaye Thera (MLI) (→ won by waza-ari awasete ippon)
- Round 2 — Ilian Nedkov (BUL) (→ lost by waza-ari awasete ippon, did not advance)

Men's Half Middleweight (–70 kg):

- António Roquete Andrade

Pool A:
- Round 1 — Bye
- Round 2 — Berkane Lakhdar Adda (ALG) (→ won by waza-ari)
- Round 3 — Bernard Tchoullouyan (FRA) (→ lost by ippon, did not advance)

=== Swimming ===
Men's 100m Backstroke:

- Rui Pinto Abreu

- Heats (heat 2) — 1:00.62(→ 5th, did not advance)

Men's 200m Backstroke:

- Rui Pinto Abreu

- Heats (heat 1) — did not participate

Men's 100m Butterfly:

- Paulo Frischknecht

- Heats (heat 4)— 57.94 (→ 5th, did not advance)

Men's 100m Freestyle:

- Rui Pinto Abreu

- Heats (heat 1) — 52.85 (→ 5th, did not advance)

Men's 200m Freestyle:

- Rui Pinto Abreu

- Heats (heat 1) — 1:55.25 (→ 4th, did not advance)

- Paulo Frischknecht

- Heats (heat 1)— 1:55.06 (→ 3rd, did not advance)

Men's 400m Freestyle:

- Paulo Frischknecht

- Heats (heat 4)— did not participate

=== Weightlifting ===
Men's Flyweight (–52 kg):

- Raul Diniz — 197,0 pts (→ 13th)

Event	Attempt			Result	Place
Event	1	2	3	Result	Place
Snatch	82,5	~~87,5~~	~~87,5~~	82,5	17th
Clean & Jerk	115,0	~~120,0~~	~~122,5~~	115,0	11th
Total				197,5	13th

== Officials ==
- Salles Grade (chief of mission)
- Fernando Lima Bello (chief of mission)
