= Yasuhiro Yamashita =

Japanese judoka (born 1957)

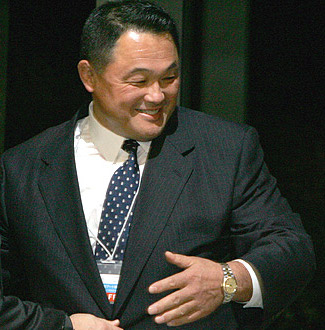
- Yasuhiro Yamashita in 2005

Personal information
- Born: 1 June 1957 (age 69) Yabe, Kumamoto, Japan
- Occupation: Judoka
- Website: www.yamashitayasuhiro.com

Sport
- Country: Japan
- Sport: Judo
- Weight class: +95 kg

Achievements and titles
- Olympic Games: (gold) (1984)
- World Champ.: (gold) (1979, 1981, 1981, 1983)
Medal record
Men's judo
Representing Japan
Olympic Games
Gold medal – first place	1984 Los Angeles	Open
World Championships
Gold medal – first place	1979 Paris	+95 kg
Gold medal – first place	1981 Maastricht	+95 kg
Gold medal – first place	1981 Maastricht	Open
Gold medal – first place	1983 Moscow	+95 kg
World Juniors Championships
Gold medal – first place	1976 Madrid	+93 kg

Profile at external databases
- IJF: 16929
- JudoInside.com: 5508
- Updated on 19 June 2023

Yasuhiro Yamashita (山下 泰裕, Yamashita Yasuhiro; born 1 June 1957) is a Japanese judoka. He currently works as an instructor or advisor for numerous organizations, including Tokai University, the International Judo Federation, and the All Japan Judo Federation. He retired from competitive judo on 17 June 1985 after a remarkable career where he won five gold medals in international competitions and marked 203 consecutive victories (with 7 draws in-between) until his retirement where he went undefeated his entire career against non-Japanese wrestlers. He received the Japanese National Prize of Honor on 9 October 1984. He is considered by many to be the greatest judoka ever.

== Biography ==
=== Competitive career ===
Yamashita began judo in primary school after being inspired by judo founder Kanō Jigorō, and had already attained a black belt by the time he reached junior-high school. Yamashita continued judo under the guidance of 1964 Summer Olympics gold medalist Isao Inokuma and 1967 World Judo Championships gold medalist Nobuyuki Sato after graduating from Tokaidai Sagami High School. His streak of 203 victories began in October, 1977, in an exhibition match held in the Soviet Union, and ended with his final match in April, 1985, where he won the All-Japan judo championships for the 9th consecutive time.

Yamashita qualified for the Olympics for the first time in 1976 as a replacement during his freshman year at Tōkai University. At age 19, he became the youngest judoka in history to win the open category of the All-Japan Judo Championships in 1977. He continued his success by winning a gold medal at the 1979 World Judo Championships, and secured a spot on the Japanese Olympic team in a highly publicized draw against 1976 Summer Olympics bronze medalist Sumio Endo. Yamashita went into the final of the 1980 All Japan championships as the favorite, but Endo put Yamashita in a Kani Basami, breaking Yamashita's fibula. The match was declared a draw even though Yamashita was hurt and unable to continue. Kani Basami had been a legal move until the match, but the seriousness of Yamashita's injury caused officials to prohibit its use in international competitions.

Japan boycotted the 1980 Summer Olympics in protest of the 1979 Soviet invasion of Afghanistan, and Yamashita was forced to look on as a spectator while his rivals competed on the Olympic stage. Yamashita won three more gold medals at the World Championships before qualifying for the Olympics for the third time in 1984. He was the only Japanese judo competitor from the boycott who also qualified for the 1984 Summer Olympics.

In his only appearance at the Olympics, Yamashita tore a right calf muscle in the preliminary match against Arthur Schnabel. This put Yamashita at a huge disadvantage since he executed his throws by pivoting on his right leg. Though he managed to win the match with an Okuri-Eri-Jime, the injury caused him to visibly limp during the semi-final match against Laurent Del Colombo. Yamashita was thrown with an Osoto Gari only 30 seconds into the match, but managed to return an Osoto Gari and won the match with a Yoko-Shiho-Gatame (side four-quarter hold). He played the final match against Mohamed Ali Rashwan of Egypt. Yamashita won the final and the gold medal despite his injury. The match witnessed a remarkable fair play act from Rashwan who did not aim for Yamashita's right leg. Rashwan was even given an award from the International Fairplay Committee.

Yamashita remained undefeated in both domestic and international competitions, though he drew several matches with two-time Olympic gold medalist Hitoshi Saito. Yamashita faced Saito in the final match of the All-Japan Judo Championships for 3 consecutive years from 1983 to 1985, and emerged victorious in every single one of those matches. After suffering from numerous injuries throughout his career, Yamashita decided to retire from competitive judo on June 17, 1985 at only 28 years of age.

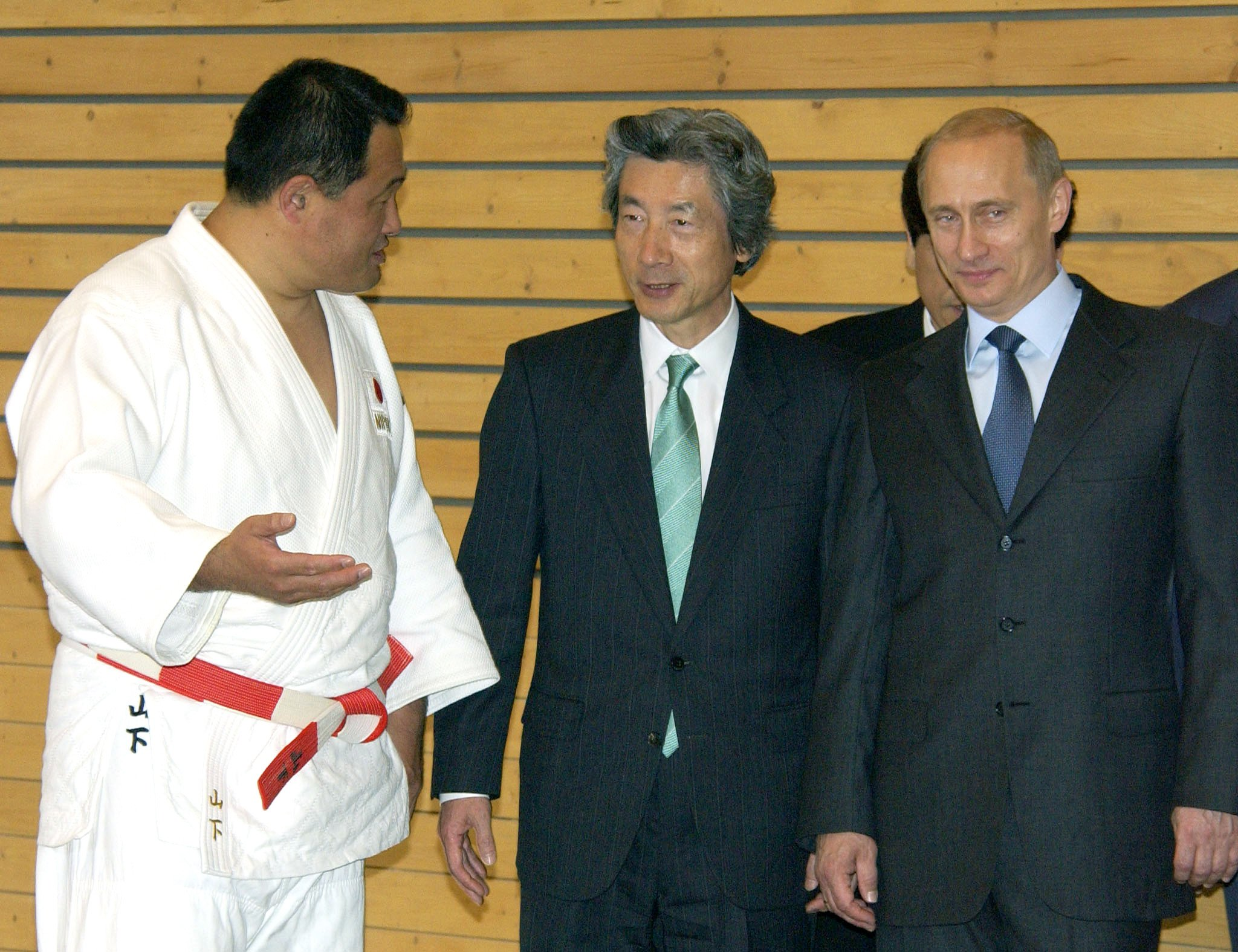
Yamashita with President Putin and Japanese Prime Minister Junichiro Koizumi in 2003.

=== Post-retirement ===
Yamashita served as an instructor for numerous organizations before becoming the International Judo Federation's Director of Education in September 2003. His presence as the head coach of the Japanese judo team was felt when he strongly protested the controversial decision in a match between David Douillet and Shinichi Shinohara at the 2000 Summer Olympics. Yamashita has also compiled an instructional judo video with Russian President Vladimir Putin, who also holds a black belt in judo. The two first met during Putin's visit to Tokyo in 2005, and Yamashita has traveled to St. Petersburg to visit the President's former judo school. He is the chairman of the Japanese Olympic Committee, and on 10 January 2020 he was elected a member of the International Olympic Committee. In 2022 he was promoted 9th dan. In October 2023, while enjoying some family time in the onsen resort of Hakone, he accidentally lost consciousness, fell, and suffered a cervical spine injury that left him almost completely paralysed.

== Judo style ==
Yamashita had a stocky build of 5 ft. 11 in. (180 cm) and weighed over 280 lbs (127 kg) during his competitive years. He stood with a left-handed stance, and his best move was the Osotogari mixed in with the Ouchi Gari. He found Ouchi to be successful and used it very frequently. He also found the Uchi mata to be highly effective against non-Japanese opponents, and used it frequently during his later years. He was also extremely effective on the ground, and many of his jacket wrestling victories came with hold or choke moves. His proficiency from both the standing position and ground position allowed him to remain unbeaten for over nine years.
