= 1982 European Judo Championships =

1982 Judo European Judo Championships
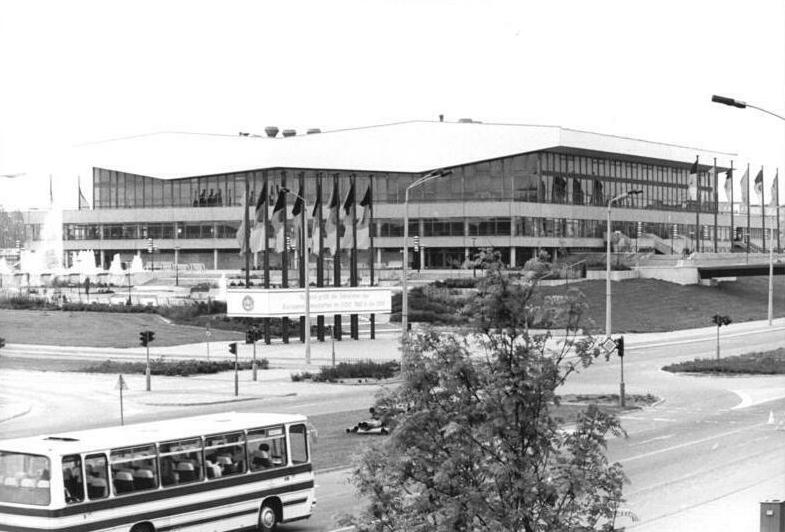
- The Rostock Sport- und Kongresshalle, venue for the championships
- Location: Rostock, East Germany
- Dates: 13–16 May 1982

Competition at external databases
- Links: JudoInside

The 1982 European Judo Championships were the 31st edition of the European Judo Championships, and were held in Rostock, East Germany from 13 to 16 May 1982.

== Medal overview ==
=== Men ===
| Event | Gold | Silver | Bronze |
|---|---|---|---|
| 60 kg | (Soviet Union) Khazret Tletseri | (Bulgaria) Atanas Gerchev | (Poland) Andrzej Dziemianiuk (East Germany) Klaus-Peter Stollberg |
| 65 kg | (East Germany) Torsten Reißmann | (France) Thierry Rey | (Poland) Janusz Pawlowski (Austria) Josef Reiter |
| 71 kg | (Italy) Ezio Gamba | (East Germany) Karl-Heinz Lehmann | (Soviet Union) Magomed Parchiev (Czechoslovakia) Stanislav Tuma |
| 78 kg | (Romania) Mircea Fratica | (Soviet Union) Shota Khabareli | (Poland) Andrzej Sądej (United Kingdom) Neil Adams |
| 86 kg | (Soviet Union) Alexander Yatskevich | (Italy) Mario Vecchi | (France) Bernard Choullouyan (East Germany) Detlef Ultsch |
| 95 kg | (Austria) Robert Köstenberger | (West Germany) Günther Neureuther | (France) Roger Vachon (Hungary) Lajos Molnár |
| 95+ kg | (West Germany) Henry Stoehr | (France) Angelo Parisi | (Soviet Union) Grigory Verichev (Hungary) Andras Oszvar |
| Open class | (Soviet Union) Alexey Tyurin | (Hungary) Andras Oszvar | (West Germany) Arthur Schnabel (East Germany) Fred Olhorn |

=== Medal table ===
| Rank | Nation | Gold | Silver | Bronze | Total |
|---|---|---|---|---|---|
| 1 | Soviet Union (URS) | 3 | 1 | 2 | 6 |
| 2 | East Germany (DDR) | 1 | 1 | 2 | 4 |
| 2 | West Germany (FRG) | 1 | 1 | 2 | 4 |
| 4 | Italy (ITA) | 1 | 1 | 0 | 2 |
| 5 | Austria (AUT) | 1 | 0 | 1 | 2 |
| 6 | Romania (ROU) | 1 | 0 | 0 | 1 |
| 7 | France (FRA) | 0 | 2 | 2 | 4 |
| 8 | Hungary (HUN) | 0 | 1 | 2 | 3 |
| 9 | Bulgaria (BUL) | 0 | 1 | 0 | 1 |
| 10 | Poland (POL) | 0 | 0 | 3 | 3 |
| 11 | Czechoslovakia (TCH) | 0 | 0 | 1 | 1 |
| 11 | Great Britain (GBR) | 0 | 0 | 1 | 1 |
| Totals (12 entries) | | 8 | 8 | 16 | 32 |

== Results overview ==
=== Men ===
==== Under 60 kg ====
| Position | Judoka | Country |
|---|---|---|
| 1. | Khazret Tletseri | Soviet Union |
| 2. | Atanas Gerchev | Bulgaria |
| 3. | Andrzej Dziemianiuk | Poland |
| 3. | Klaus-Peter Stollberg | Germany |
| 5. | Pavel Petřikov | Czechoslovakia |
| 5. | Eddy Koaz | Israel |
| 7. | Guy Le Baupin | France |
| 7. | Hubert Rohrauer | Austria |

==== Under 65 kg ====
| Position | Judoka | Country |
|---|---|---|
| 1. | Torsten Reißmann | East Germany |
| 2. | Thierry Rey | France |
| 3. | Janusz Pawlowski | Poland |
| 3. | Josef Reiter | Austria |
| 5. | Sandro Rosati | Italy |
| 5. | Francisco Rodriguez | Spain |
| 7. | Constantin Niculae | Romania |
| 7. | Petr Ponomarev | Soviet Union |

==== Under 71 kg ====
| Position | Judoka | Country |
|---|---|---|
| 1. | Ezio Gamba | Italy |
| 2. | Karl-Heinz Lehmann | East Germany |
| 3. | Magomed Parchiev | Soviet Union |
| 3. | Stanislav Tuma | Czechoslovakia |
| 5. | Serge Dyot | France |
| 5. | Károly Molnar | Hungary |
| 7. | Wieslaw Blach | Poland |
| 7. | Jon Idarreta | Spain |

==== Under 78 kg ====
| Position | Judoka | Country |
|---|---|---|
| 1. | Mircea Fratica | Romania |
| 2. | Shota Khabareli | Soviet Union |
| 3. | Andrzej Sądej | Poland |
| 3. | Neil Adams | Great Britain |
| 5. | Seppo Myllyla | Finland |
| 5. | Filip Lescak | Slovenia |

==== Under 86 kg ====
| Position | Judoka | Country |
|---|---|---|
| 1. | Alexander Yatskevich | Soviet Union |
| 2. | Mario Vecchi | Italy |
| 3. | Bernard Choullouyan | France |
| 3. | Detlef Ultsch | East Germany |
| 5. | János Gyáni | Hungary |
| 5. | Alfonso García | Spain |
| 7. | Peter Seisenbacher | Austria |
| 7. | Jirí Sosna | Czech Republic |

==== Under 95 kg ====
| Position | Judoka | Country |
|---|---|---|
| 1. | Robert Köstenberger | Austria |
| 2. | Günther Neureuther | West Germany |
| 3. | Roger Vachon | France |
| 3. | Lajos Molnár | Hungary |
| 5. | Henk Numan | Netherlands |
| 5. | Tengiz Khubuluri | Soviet Union |

==== Over 95 kg ====
| Position | Judoka | Country |
|---|---|---|
| 1. | Henry Stoehr | Germany |
| 2. | Angelo Parisi | France |
| 3. | Grigory Verichev | Soviet Union |
| 3. | Andras Oszvar | Hungary |
| 5. | Wojciech Reszko | Poland |
| 5. | Alexander Von der Groeben | West Germany |

==== Open class ====
| Position | Judoka | Country |
|---|---|---|
| 1. | Alexey Tyurin | Soviet Union |
| 2. | Andras Oszvar | Hungary |
| 3. | Arthur Schnabel | West Germany |
| 3. | Fred Olhorn | East Germany |
| 5. | Willy Wilhelm | Netherlands |
| 5. | Laurent Del Colombo | France |
| 7. | Marino Beccacece | Italy |
| 7. | Todor Barisic | Yugoslavia |
