= Judo at the 1984 Summer Olympics =

Judo Judo at the Games of the XXIII Olympiad
- Venue: Eagle's Nest Arena
- Location: Los Angeles, California, United States
- Dates: 4–11 August 1984
- Competitors: 211 from 61 nations

Competition at external databases
- Links: IJF • JudoInside

The Judo competition at the 1984 Summer Olympics continued the seven weight classes first used at the 1980 Games. With the open division, there were eight competitions. Powerhouse Japan returned to the top of the medal count after eight years, having boycotted the Moscow games. Because of the Soviet-led boycott of the Los Angeles games, several traditionally strong judo countries, including Cuba and the Soviet Union, did not participate. The Judo competition was held at California State University, Los Angeles.

Austrian Peter Seisenbacher in the 86 kg class won the gold medal, as did Hitoshi Saito of Japan in the over 95 kg class, feats they would repeat in 1988, becoming the first judoka to win gold at two Olympics.

In the open division, four-time world champion Yasuhiro Yamashita tore a right calf muscle in the preliminary match against Arthur Schnabel. This put Yamashita at a huge disadvantage since he executed his throws by pivoting on his right leg. Though he managed to win the match with an Okuri-Eri-Jime, the injury caused him to visibly limp during the semi-final match against Laurent Del Colombo. Yamashita was thrown with an Osoto Gari only 30 seconds into the match, but managed to return an Osoto Gari and won the match with a Yoko-Shiho-Gatame (side four-quarter hold). He played the final match against Mohamed Ali Rashwan of Egypt. Yamashita won the final and the gold medal despite his injury. The match witnessed a remarkable fair play act from Rashwan who did not aim for Yamashita's right leg. Rashwan was even given an award from the International Fairplay Committee.

Popular pro wrestler/judoka Chris Adams appeared as an advisor to the UK Judo squad, where his brother Neil Adams won a silver medal in the 78 kg class. It was the third and final Olympics the Adams brothers were involved in, competitor or otherwise.

== Medal summary ==
Games	Gold	Silver	Bronze
Extra Lightweight; 60 kg	Shinji Hosokawa; Japan	Kim Jae-yup; South Korea	Neil Eckersley; Great Britain Edward Liddie; United States
Half Lightweight; 65 kg	Yoshiyuki Matsuoka; Japan	Hwang Jung-oh; South Korea	Marc Alexandre; France Josef Reiter; Austria
Lightweight; 71 kg	Ahn Byeong-keun; South Korea	Ezio Gamba; Italy	Kerrith Brown; Great Britain Luiz Onmura; Brazil
Half Middleweight; 78 kg	Frank Wieneke; West Germany	Neil Adams; Great Britain	Mircea Frăţică; Romania Michel Nowak; France
Middleweight; 86 kg	Peter Seisenbacher; Austria	Robert Berland; United States	Walter Carmona; Brazil Seiki Nose; Japan
Half Heavyweight; 95 kg	Ha Hyung-joo; South Korea	Douglas Vieira; Brazil	Bjarni Friðriksson; Iceland Günther Neureuther; West Germany
Heavyweight +95 kg	Hitoshi Saito; Japan	Angelo Parisi; France	Mark Berger; Canada Cho Yong-chul; South Korea
Open category	Yasuhiro Yamashita; Japan	Mohamed Ali Rashwan; Egypt	Mihai Cioc; Romania Arthur Schnabel; West Germany

== Participating nations ==
- Argentina (4)
- Australia (3)
- Austria (4)
- Belgium (2)
- Bolivia (1)
- Brazil (7)
- Cameroon (6)
- Canada (8)
- Chile (1)
- China (5)
- Chinese Taipei (4)
- Costa Rica (4)
- Republic of the Congo (3)
- Cyprus (2)
- Denmark (1)
- Dominican Republic (2)
- Ecuador (1)
- Egypt (6)
- El Salvador (2)
- Fiji (2)
- Finland (3)
- France (8)
- Great Britain (8)
- Guinea (1)
- Honduras (1)
- Hong Kong (4)
- Iceland (2)
- Ireland (1)
- Israel (2)
- Italy (5)
- Ivory Coast (2)
- Japan (8)
- Kuwait (5)
- Lebanon (3)
- Liechtenstein (2)
- Mali (1)
- Mexico (4)
- Monaco (1)
- Morocco (3)
- Netherlands (3)
- New Zealand (3)
- Norway (3)
- Paraguay (1)
- Peru (1)
- Portugal (4)
- Puerto Rico (2)
- Romania (3)
- San Marino (2)
- Senegal (6)
- South Korea (8)
- Spain (6)
- Suriname (1)
- Sweden (4)
- Switzerland (2)
- Tunisia (3)
- Turkey (3)
- United States (8)
- Venezuela (1)
- West Germany (8)
- Yugoslavia (5)
- Zambia (3)

== Medal table ==
Rank	Nation	Gold	Silver	Bronze	Total
1	Japan	4	0	1	5
2	South Korea	2	2	1	5
3	West Germany	1	0	2	3
4	Austria	1	0	1	2
5	Brazil	0	1	2	3
5	France	0	1	2	3
5	Great Britain	0	1	2	3
8	United States	0	1	1	2
9	Egypt	0	1	0	1
9	Italy	0	1	0	1
11	Romania	0	0	2	2
12	Canada	0	0	1	1
12	Iceland	0	0	1	1
Totals (13 entries)		8	8	16	32

== See also ==
- Judo at the Friendship Games
- Sachio Ashida – Referee
