= Judo at the 1980 Summer Olympics – Men's +95 kg =

Judo competition

Men's +95kg at the Games of the XXII Olympiad
- Venue: Palace of Sports of the Central Lenin Stadium
- Date: July 27, 1980
- Competitors: 16 from 16 nations

Medalists
1st place, gold medalist(s)		Angelo Parisi	France
2nd place, silver medalist(s)		Dimitar Zapryanov	Bulgaria
3rd place, bronze medalist(s)		Vladimír Kocman	Czechoslovakia
3rd place, bronze medalist(s)		Radomir Kovačević	Yugoslavia

Men's +95 kg competition in Judo at the 1980 Summer Olympics in Moscow, Soviet Union was held at Palace of Sports of the Central Lenin Stadium. The gold medal was won by Angelo Parisi from France.

== Results ==
=== Pool A ===
Round of 32
Mihai Cioc (ROM)	0:00
Jaakko Saari (FIN)	wo
Paul Radburn (GBR)
Bye
Jean Zinniker (SUI)
Bye
Abdoulaye Kote (SEN)
Bye
Vladimír Kocman (TCH)
Bye
Peter Adelaar (NED)
Bye
Angelo Parisi (FRA)
Bye
Wojciech Reszko (POL)
Bye

Round of 16
Paul Radburn (GBR)	5:00
Mihai Cioc (ROM)	E
Jean Zinneker (SUI)	5:00
Abdoulaye Kote (SEN)	E
Vladimír Kocman (TCH)	4:56
Peter Adelaar (NED)	E
Angelo Parisi (FRA)	5:00
Wojciech Reszko (POL)	R

Quarterfinal
Paul Radburn (GBR)	5:00
Jean Zinneker (SUI)	E
Angelo Parisi (FRA)	1:24
Vladimír Kocman (TCH)	R

Semifinal
Angelo Parisi (FRA)	5:00
Paul Radburn (GBR)	E

=== Pool B ===
Round of 32
Radomir Kovačević (YUG)	1:07
Güsemiin Jalaa (MGL)	E
Vitaly Kuznetsov (URS)
Bye
Dimitar Zapryanov (BUL)
Bye
Ulf Ekberg (SWE)
Bye
Oswaldo Simões Filho (BRA)
Bye
Kim Myong-gyu (PRK)
Bye
Imre Varga (HUN)
Bye
Sayed Farhad (KUW)
Bye

Round of 16
Radomir Kovačević (YUG)	5:00
Vitaly Kuznetsov (URS)	E
Dimitar Zapryanov (BUL)	0:00
Ulf Ekberg (SWE)	wo
Kim Myong Gyu (PRK)	5:00
Oswaldo Simões Filho (BRA)	E
Imre Varga (HUN)	0:59
Sayed Farhad (KUW)	E

Quarterfinal
Dimitar Zapryanov (BUL)	2:46
Radomir Kovačević (YUG)	R
Kim Myong Gyu (PRK)	5:00
Imre Varga (HUN)	E

Semifinal
Dimitar Zapryanov (BUL)	5:00
Kim Myong Gyu (PRK)	R

=== Repechages ===
Repechage	Repechage semifinal		Repechage final
	Vladimír Kocman (TCH)	5:00
	Wojciech Reszko (POL)	E
			Vladimír Kocman (TCH)	5:02 (bronze)
			Paul Radburn (GBR)

Repechage	Repechage semifinal	Repechage final
		Radomir Kovačević (YUG)	7:00 (bronze)
		Kim Myong Gyu (PRK)

=== Final ===
Final
Angelo Parisi (FRA)	6:14 (gold)
Dimitar Zapryanov (BUL)	2nd place, silver medalist(s)
