= Spyros Spyrou =

Spyros Spyrou may refer to:

- Spyros Spyrou (politician) (b. 1945), Greek MP and regional governor
- Spyros Spyrou (judoka) (b. 1956), Cypriot judoka
- Spyros Spyrou (runner) (b. 1958), Cypriot middle-distance runner
