= Fagerlund =

Fagerlund is a surname. It may refer to:

- Jonathan Fagerlund (born 1991), Swedish singer, sometimes known just by the mononym Jonathan
- Lennart Fagerlund (born 1952), Swedish cyclist
- Reino Fagerlund (1953–2019), Finnish judoka
- Rickard Fagerlund (1937–2009), Swedish ice hockey player and manager
- Rusameekae Fagerlund (born 1986), Thai-Senegalese actor, volleyball player, celebrity boxer
- Sebastian Fagerlund (born 1972), Finnish composer
