= Judo at the 1980 Summer Olympics – Men's 60 kg =

Judo competition

Men's 60kg at the Games of the XXII Olympiad
- Venue: Palace of Sports of the Central Lenin Stadium
- Date: 1 August 1980
- Competitors: 29 from 29 nations

Medalists
1st place, gold medalist(s)		Thierry Rey	France
2nd place, silver medalist(s)		José Rodríguez	Cuba
3rd place, bronze medalist(s)		Tibor Kincses	Hungary
3rd place, bronze medalist(s)		Aramby Emizh	Soviet Union

Men's 60 kg competition in Judo at the 1980 Summer Olympics in Moscow, Soviet Union was held at Palace of Sports of the Central Lenin Stadium. The gold medal was won by Thierry Rey of France.

== Results ==
=== Pool A ===
Round of 32
José Rodríguez (CUB)	2:37
Naji Keyrouz (LIB)	R
Samir El-Najjar (SYR)	0:19
Charles Chibwe (ZAM)	E
John Holliday (GBR)	5:00
Alberto Francini (SMR)	E
Spyros Spyrou (CYP)	5:00
Mamodaly Ashikhoussen (MAD)	E
Luiz Juniti Shinohara (BRA)	5:00
Boubacar Sow (SEN)	E
Tibor Kincses (HUN)	3:19
Ali Heidar Ali Mohamed (KUW)	E
Ko hyong (PRK)	5:00
Rafael González (MEX)	E
Ronny Sanabria (CRC)
BYE

Round of 16
José Rodríguez (CUB)	0:11
Samir El-Najjar (SYR)	R
John Holliday (GBR)	2:28
Spyros Spyrou (CYP)	E
Tibor Kincses (HUN)	5:00
Luiz Juniti Shinohara (BRA)	E
Ko Hyong (PRK)	5:00
Ronny Sanabria (CRC)	E

Quarterfinal
José Rodríguez (CUB)	1:35
John Holliday (GBR)	R
Tibor Kincses (HUN)	5:00
Ko Hyong (PRK)	E

Semifinal
José Rodríguez (CUB)	0:51
Tibor Kincses (HUN)	R

=== Pool B ===
Round of 32
Thierry Rey (FRA)	5:00
Reino Fagerlund (FIN)	R
João Paulo Mendonça (POR)	5:00
Marian Donat (POL)	E
Pavel Petřikov (TCH)	1:16
Ibrahim Camara (GUI)	E
Marcel Burkhardt (SUI)
BYE
Aramby Emizh (URS)	1:16
Josef Reiter (AUT)	E
Ahmed Moussa (ALG)	1:08
Habib Sissoko (MLI)	E
Reinhardt Arndt (GDR)	5:00
Árpád Szabó (ROM)	E
Yanjmaagiin Dorj (MGL)
BYE

Round of 16
Thierry Rey (FRA)	4:21
João Paulo Mendonça (POR)	R
Pavel Petřikov (TCH)	5:00
Marcel Burkhard (SUI)	E
Aramby Emizh (URS)	5:00
Ahmed Moussa (ALG)	E
Yanjmaagiin Dorj (MGL)	5:00
Reinhardt Arndt (GDR)	E

Quarterfinal
Thierry Rey (FRA)	5:00
Pavel Petřikov (TCH)	R
Aramby Emizh (URS)	5:00
Yanjmaagiin Dorj (MGL)	E

Semifinal
Thierry Rey (FRA)	5:00
Aramby Emizh (URS)	R

=== Repechages ===
Repechage		Repechage semifinal		Repechage final
Samir El-Najjar (SYR)	3:42
Naji Keyrouz (LIB)	E	John Holliday (GBR)	2:46
		Samir El-Najjar (SYR)	E
				Tibor Kincses (HUN)	7:00 (bronze)
				John Holliday (GBR)	E

Repechage		Repechage semifinal		Repechage final
Reino Fagerlund (FIN)	5:00
João Paulo Mendonça (POR)	E	Pavel Petřikov (TCH)	5:00
		Reino Fagerlund (FIN)	E
				Aramby Emizh (URS)	4:18 (bronze)
				Pavel Petřikov (TCH)

=== Final ===
Final
Thierry Rey (FRA)	7:00 (gold)
José Rodríguez (CUB)	2nd place, silver medalist(s)
