= Benjamin McMurray =

Filipino judoka

Personal information
- Nationality: Filipino
- Born: February 24, 1962 (age 64)
- Height: 6 ft 0 in (183 cm)
- Weight: 240 lb (110 kg)

Sport
- Sport: Judo

Benjamin McMurray (born February 24, 1962) is a Filipino judoka. He competed in the men's heavyweight event at the 1988 Summer Olympics.
