= Roger Vachon =

French judoka (born 1957)

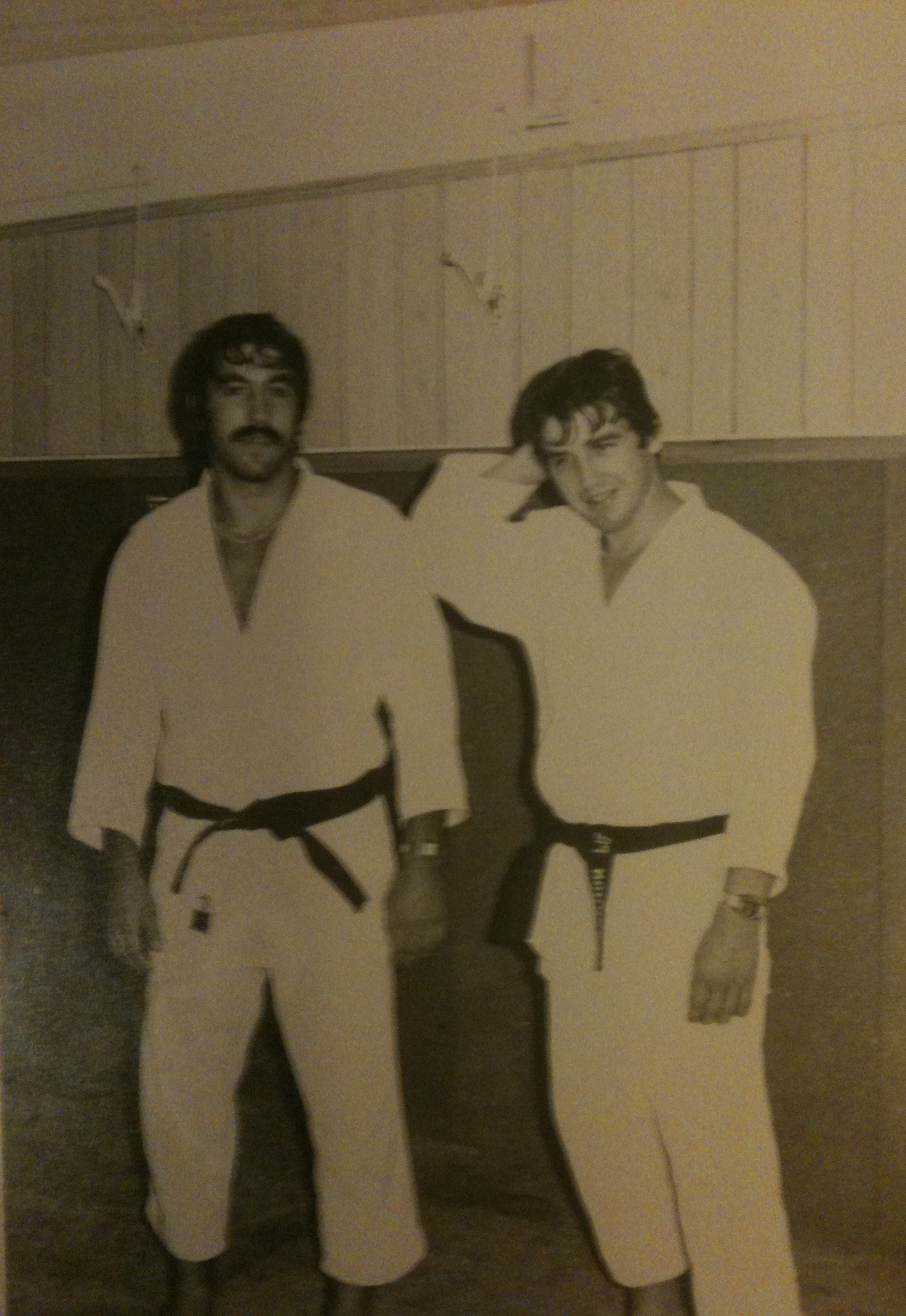
- Roger Vachon (left)

Personal information
- Born: 29 August 1957 (age 68) Paris, France
- Occupation: Judoka

Sport
- Country: France
- Sport: Judo
- Weight class: ‍–‍95 kg, +95 kg

Achievements and titles
- Olympic Games: R32 (1984, 1988)
- World Champ.: (bronze) (1981)
- European Champ.: (gold) (1981)
Medal record
Men's judo
Representing France
World Championships
Bronze medal – third place	1981 Maastricht	‍–‍95 kg
European Championships
Gold medal – first place	1981 Debrecen	‍–‍95 kg
Silver medal – second place	1983 Paris	‍–‍95 kg
Silver medal – second place	1985 Hamar	‍–‍95 kg
Silver medal – second place	1986 Belgrade	‍–‍95 kg
Silver medal – second place	1987 Paris	‍–‍95 kg
Bronze medal – third place	1982 Rostock	‍–‍95 kg
Bronze medal – third place	1984 Liege	‍–‍95 kg
Bronze medal – third place	1986 Belgrade	Open
European Junior Championships
Bronze medal – third place	1977 Berlin	‍–‍95 kg

Profile at external databases
- IJF: 4964
- JudoInside.com: 5250
- Updated on 9 July 2024

Roger Vachon (born 29 August 1957) is a French judoka. He competed at the 1984 Summer Olympics and the 1988 Summer Olympics.
