= Jean Zinniker =

Swiss judoka

Personal information
- Nationality: Swiss
- Born: 26 April 1952 (age 72)

Sport
- Sport: Judo

Jean Zinniker (born 26 April 1952) is a Swiss judoka. He competed in the men's heavyweight event at the 1980 Summer Olympics.
