= Henry Stöhr =

East German judoka (born 1960)

Personal information
- Born: 6 June 1960 (age 66)
- Occupation: Judoka

Sport
- Country: East Germany
- Sport: Judo
- Weight class: +95 kg, Open

Achievements and titles
- Olympic Games: (silver) (1988)
- World Champ.: (silver) (1993)
- European Champ.: (gold) (1982, 1986, 1991)
Medal record
Men's judo
Representing East Germany
Olympic Games
Silver medal – second place	1988 Seoul	+95 kg
World Championships
Silver medal – second place	1993 Hamilton	Open
Bronze medal – third place	1983 Moscow	+95 kg
Bronze medal – third place	1987 Essen	Open
European Championships
Gold medal – first place	1982 Rostock	+95 kg
Gold medal – first place	1986 Belgrade	Open
Gold medal – first place	1991 Prague	+95 kg
Silver medal – second place	1986 Belgrade	+95 kg
Bronze medal – third place	1988 Pamplona	+95 kg
Bronze medal – third place	1993 Athens	Open

Profile at external databases
- IJF: 61988
- JudoInside.com: 2224
- Updated on 18 June 2023

Henry Stöhr (born 6 June 1960) is an East German judoka, who competed for the SC Dynamo Hoppegarten / Sportvereinigung (SV) Dynamo.

Stöhr was born in Reichenbach. Stöhr won medals at international competitions included over 15 national titles.
