= Kolbeinn Gíslason =

Icelandic judoka (born 1955)

Personal information
- Nationality: Icelandic
- Born: 16 December 1955 (age 69)

Sport
- Sport: Judo

Kolbeinn Gíslason (born 16 December 1955) is an Icelandic judoka. He competed in the men's open category event at the 1984 Summer Olympics.
