= Klaus-Peter Stollberg =

German judoka

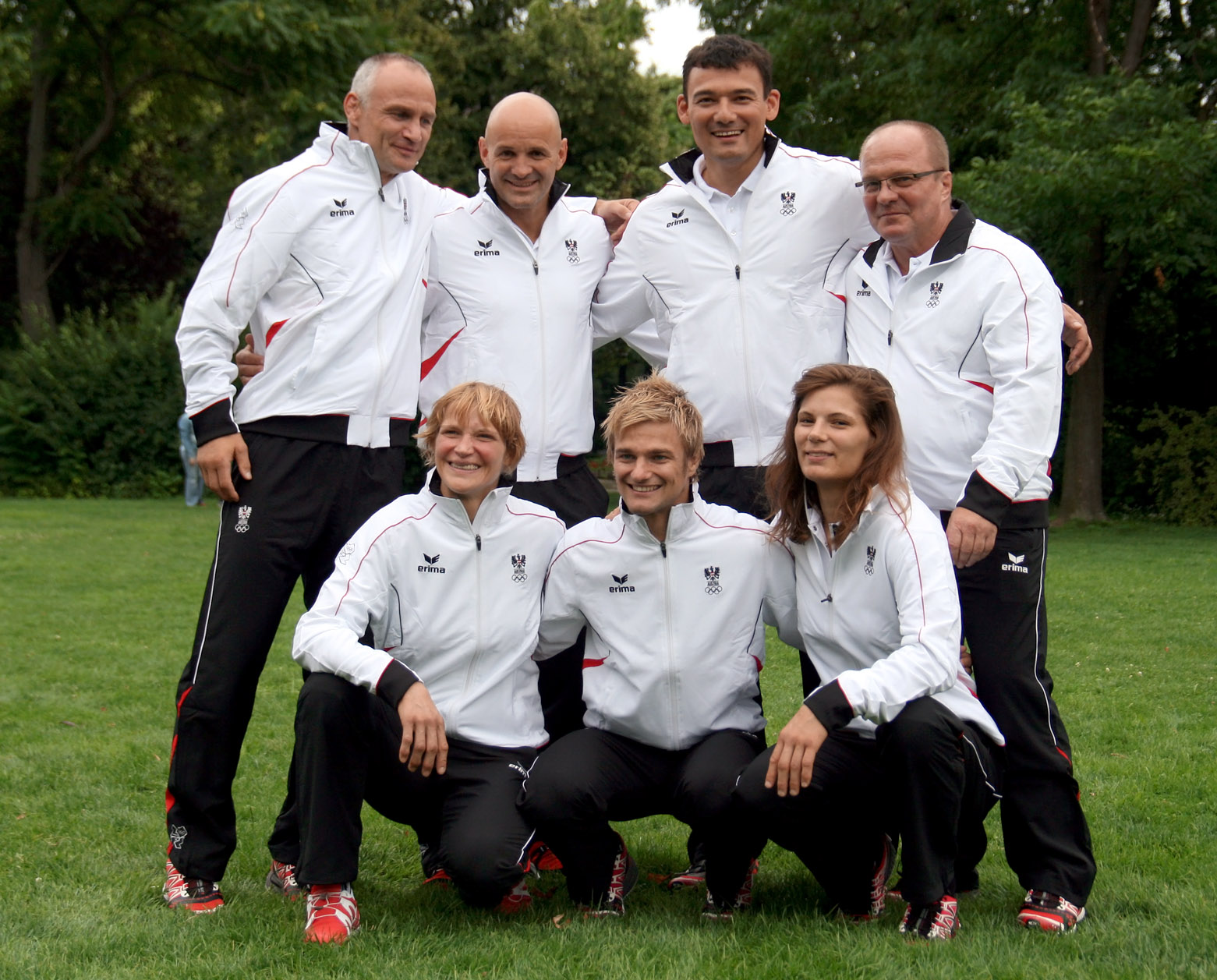

Personal information
- Nickname: Stolli
- Born: 15 September 1959 (age 66) East Germany
- Occupation: Judo coach
- Website: stollberg.at

Sport
- Country: Germany
- Sport: Judo
- Weight class: –60 kg
- Rank: 7th dan black belt
- Retired: 1988

Achievements and titles
- World Champ.: (bronze) (1983)
- European Champ.: (bronze) (1983, 1982)
Medal record
Men's Judo
Representing East Germany
World Championships
Bronze medal – third place	1983 Moscow	–60 kg
European Championships
Bronze medal – third place	1983 Paris	–60 kg
Bronze medal – third place	1982 Rostock	–60 kg

Profile at external databases
- IJF: 1682
- JudoInside.com: 5635
- Updated on 8 August 2022

Klaus-Peter Stollberg (born 15 September, 1959 in East Germany) was a German judoka. He retired in 1988. He is a 6th-degree black belt. From 1992 to 2024 he worked as a coach in Austria.
