= Ahmed Moussa (judoka) =

Algerian judoka (born 1951)

Personal information
- Nationality: Algerian
- Born: 7 November 1951 (age 73)

Sport
- Sport: Judo

Ahmed Moussa (born 7 November 1951) is an Algerian judoka. He competed in the men's extra-lightweight event at the 1980 Summer Olympics.
