= Kim Gwan-hyeon =

South Korean judoka (born 1955)

Personal information
- Nationality: South Korean
- Born: 7 February 1955 (age 70)

Sport
- Sport: Judo

Kim Gwan-hyeon (born 7 February 1955) is a South Korean judoka. He competed in the men's open category event at the 1984 Summer Olympics.
