= István Dubrovszky =

Hungarian judoka

Personal information
- Nationality: Hungarian
- Born: 13 September 1959 (age 65); Szigetvár, Hungary

Sport
- Sport: Judo

István Dubrovszky (born 13 September 1959) is a Hungarian judoka. He competed in the men's heavyweight event at the 1988 Summer Olympics.
