= Andrzej Sądej =

Polish and Canadian judoka

Personal information
- Nickname: Captain Intensity
- Born: 20 December 1957 (age 68)
- Occupation: Judoka

Sport
- Country: Poland
- Sport: Judo
- Weight class: ‍–‍78 kg
- Rank: 8th dan black belt
- Club: Takahashi Dojo; National Training Centre

Achievements and titles
- World Champ.: 7th (1981)
- European Champ.: (bronze) (1981, 1982, 1983, 1987)
Medal record
Men's judo
Representing Poland
European Championships
Bronze medal – third place	1981 Debrecen	‍–‍78 kg
Bronze medal – third place	1982 Rostock	‍–‍78 kg
Bronze medal – third place	1983 Paris	‍–‍78 kg
Bronze medal – third place	1987 Paris	‍–‍78 kg
European Junior Championships
Bronze medal – third place	1977 Berlin	‍–‍78 kg

Profile at external databases
- IJF: 1124
- JudoInside.com: 1161
- Updated on 26 June 2025

Andrzej Sądej (born 20 December 1957) is a Polish and Canadian judoka who competed as a member of the Polish national judo team and has played a major role in the development of high-level judo in Canada. He coached the Canadian national judo team from 1990 to 1996, has held a wide variety of administrative positions at Judo Canada including Sports Director and executive director since 1998, and has coached the Canadian Paralympic team since 2014.

== Interviews ==
- "Andrzej Sadej, Judo Canada's Sports Director". Conversations with Garmamie (Podcast). YouTube. 1 July 2015.

== See also ==
- Judo in Ontario
- Judo in Canada
- List of Canadian judoka
