= Andrzej Basik =

Polish judoka

Personal information
- Born: 22 March 1960 (age 66) Wilkowice, Poland
- Occupation: Judoka

Sport
- Country: Poland
- Sport: Judo
- Weight class: +95 kg, Open

Achievements and titles
- Olympic Games: QF (1988)
- World Champ.: R16 (1985)
- European Champ.: (bronze) (1985, 1987)
Medal record
Men's judo
Representing Poland
European Championships
Bronze medal – third place	1985 Hamar	Open
Bronze medal – third place	1987 Paris	Open

Profile at external databases
- IJF: 53781
- JudoInside.com: 1085
- Updated on 9 July 2024

Andrzej Basik (born 22 March 1960) is a Polish judoka. He competed in the men's heavyweight event at the 1988 Summer Olympics.
