= Tibor Kincses =

Hungarian Olympic judoka (1960–2025)

Personal information
- Born: 12 February 1960 Kecskemét, Hungary
- Died: 9 June 2025 (aged 65)
- Occupation: Judoka

Sport
- Country: Hungary
- Sport: Judo
- Weight class: ‍–‍60 kg
- Rank: 3rd dan black belt

Achievements and titles
- Olympic Games: (bronze) (1980)
- World Champ.: 7th (1981)
- European Champ.: 5th (1981)
Medal record
Men's judo
Representing Hungary
Olympic Games
Bronze medal – third place	1980 Moscow	‍–‍60 kg

Profile at external databases
- IJF: 54198
- JudoInside.com: 5276
- Updated on 19 June 2023

Tibor Kincses (12 February 1960 – 9 June 2025) was a Hungarian judoka who competed in the 1980 Summer Olympics.

== Later life ==
Later after finishing his athletic career, Kincses worked with the PR and Communication Department of AIBA, and then he was appointed PR & Communication Director of the Asian Boxing Confederation (ASBC). Kincses died 9 June 2025, at the age of 65.
