= Reinhardt Arndt =

German judoka

Personal information
- Nationality: German
- Born: 4 June 1952 (age 72); Berlin, Germany

Sport
- Sport: Judo

Reinhardt Arndt (born 4 June 1952) is a German judoka. He competed in the men's extra-lightweight event at the 1980 Summer Olympics.
