= Osoto gaeshi =

Judo technique

- Classification: Nage-waza
- Sub classification: Ashi-waza
- Kodokan: Yes

Technique name
- Rōmaji: Osoto gaeshi
- Japanese: 大外返
- English: Big outer reap counter

Osoto Gaeshi (大外返) is one of the techniques adopted by the Kodokan into their Shinmeisho No Waza (newly accepted techniques) list. It is categorized as a foot technique, Ashi-waza. It is essentially a counter throw or reversal for Osoto gari.

== Technique Description ==
As the opponent steps in to attempt an Osoto Gari, the tori defends himself by drawing back his trailing foot, and twist his own torso, in doing so cutting down the uke using the same throw.

== Bibliography ==
- Ohlenkamp, Neil (2006). Judo Unleashed. New York City: McGraw-Hill. ISBN 978-0-07-147534-1. OCLC 68813868.

== See also ==
- Judo technique
- Judo Lists
