= Habib Sissoko (judoka) =

Malian judoka (born 1959)

Personal information
- Nationality: Malian
- Born: 2 January 1959 (age 67)
- Occupation: Judoka

Sport
- Sport: Judo

Profile at external databases
- JudoInside.com: 13122

Habib Sissoko (born 2 January 1959) is a Malian judoka. He competed in the men's extra-lightweight event at the 1980 Summer Olympics.
