= Boualem Miloudi =

Algerian judoka (born 1965)

Personal information
- Nationality: Algerian
- Born: 29 May 1965 (age 60)

Sport
- Sport: Judo

Boualem Miloudi (born 29 May 1965) is an Algerian judoka. He competed in the men's heavyweight event at the 1988 Summer Olympics.
