= Kim Myong-gyu =

North Korean judoka (born 1953)

Personal information
- Native name: 김명규
- Nationality: North Korean
- Born: 20 June 1953 (age 72)

Sport
- Sport: Judo

Kim Myong-gyu (born 20 June 1953) is a North Korean judoka. He competed in the men's heavyweight event at the 1980 Summer Olympics.
