= Dimitar Zapryanov =

Bulgarian judoka (1960–2024)

Personal information
- Born: 27 January 1960
- Died: July 2024 (aged 64)
- Occupation: Judoka

Sport
- Country: Bulgaria
- Sport: Judo
- Weight class: +95 kg

Achievements and titles
- Olympic Games: (silver) (1980)
- World Champ.: (bronze) (1985)
- European Champ.: (silver) (1981, 1983)
Medal record
Men's judo
Representing Bulgaria
Olympic Games
Silver medal – second place	1980 Moscow	+95 kg
World Championships
Bronze medal – third place	1985 Seoul	+95 kg
European Championships
Silver medal – second place	1981 Debrecen	+95 kg
Silver medal – second place	1983 Paris	+95 kg
Bronze medal – third place	1988 Pamplona	+95 kg
European Junior Championships
Bronze medal – third place	1979 Edinburgh	+95 kg
European Cadet Championships
Bronze medal – third place	1978 Miskolc	+83 kg
Friendship Games
Silver medal – second place	1984 Moscow	+95 kg

Profile at external databases
- IJF: 53774
- JudoInside.com: 760
- Updated on 20 June 2023

Dimitar Lambev Zapryanov (Bulgarian: Димитър Ламбев Запрянов; 27 January 1960 – 13 July 2024) was a Bulgarian judoka who competed in the 1980 Summer Olympics and in the 1988 Summer Olympics. Zapryanov died on 13 July 2024, at the age of 64.
