= Sayed Farhad =

Kuwaiti judoka

Personal information
- Nationality: Kuwaiti

Sport
- Sport: Judo

Sayed Farhad is a Kuwaiti judoka. He competed in the men's heavyweight event at the 1980 Summer Olympics.
