= Ko Hyong =

North Korean judoka (born 1956)

Personal information
- Nationality: North Korean
- Born: 14 January 1956 (age 69)

Sport
- Sport: Judo

Ko Hyong (born 14 January 1956) is a North Korean judoka. He competed in the men's extra-lightweight event at the 1980 Summer Olympics.
