= Paul Radburn =

British judoka (born 1955)

Personal information
- Nationality: British
- Born: 23 May 1955 (age 71) London, England

Sport
- Sport: Judo
Medal record
Representing Great Britain
European Championships
Bronze medal – third place	1977 Ludwigshafen	-95 kg
Bronze medal – third place	1979 Brussels	open

Paul Radburn (born 23 May 1955) is a British judoka. He competed at the 1980 Summer Olympics and the 1984 Summer Olympics.

== Judo career ==
Radburn became a champion of Great Britain, winning the light-heavyweight division at the British Judo Championships in 1976. The following year he won a bronze medal at the 1977 European Judo Championships in Ludwigshafen and he followed up this success by repeating the bronze medal success at the 1979 European Judo Championships in Brussels; the latter was in the open weight category

He was selected to represent Great Britain at the 1980 Olympic Games in Moscow. He competed in the men's +95 kg category and just missed out on medal after reaching the semi-finals and losing in the repechage final to Vladimír Kocman. Four years later he went to his second Olympic Games, participating in the men's open category, which was held at the California State University in Los Angeles, where he failed to progress from Pool B.
