= Frederico Flexa =

Brazilian judoka (born 1964)

Personal information
- Full name: Frederico Fernando Kuntzle Flexa
- Born: 12 January 1964 (age 62) Rio de Janeiro, Brazil
- Occupation: Judoka

Sport
- Country: Brazil
- Sport: Judo
- Weight class: +95 kg

Achievements and titles
- Olympic Games: QF (1988)
- World Champ.: R16 (1985, 1987)
- Pan American Champ.: (1984, 1986, 1988)
Medal record
Women's judo
Representing Brazil
Pan American Games
Silver medal – second place	1983 Caracas	+95 kg
Silver medal – second place	1987 Indianapolis	+95 kg
Bronze medal – third place	1991 Havana	+95 kg
Pan American Championships
Gold medal – first place	1984 Mexico CIty	+95 kg
Gold medal – first place	1986 Salinas	+95 kg
Gold medal – first place	1988 Buenos Aires	Open
Silver medal – second place	1985 Havana	+95 kg
World Juniors Championships
Bronze medal – third place	1983 Mayaguez	+95 kg

Profile at external databases
- IJF: 53456, 53801
- JudoInside.com: 6459
- Updated on 16 June 2026

Frederico Fernando Kuntzle Flexa (born 12 January 1964) is a Brazilian judoka. He competed at the 1984, 1988 and the 1996 Summer Olympics.
