= Yanjmaagiin Dorj =

Mongolian judoka (born 1954)

Personal information
- Nationality: Mongolian
- Born: 17 June 1954 (age 70)

Sport
- Sport: Judo

Yanjmaagiin Dorj (born 17 June 1954) is a Mongolian judoka. He competed in the men's extra-lightweight event at the 1980 Summer Olympics.
