= Bechir Kiiari =

Tunisian judoka (born 1960)

Personal information
- Nationality: Tunisian
- Born: 24 April 1960 (age 65)

Sport
- Sport: Judo

Bechir Kiiari (born 24 April 1960) is a Tunisian judoka. He competed in the men's open category event at the 1984 Summer Olympics.
