= Dragomir Kusmuk =

Yugoslavian judoka (born 1955)

Personal information
- Nationality: Yugoslav
- Born: 28 May 1955 (age 70)

Sport
- Sport: Judo

Dragomir Kusmuk (born 28 May 1955) is a Yugoslav judoka. He won 12 national championships and was ranked among the top 5 in Europe during the 1980s. He competed in the men's heavyweight event at the 1988 Summer Olympics.
