= Árpád Szabó (judoka) =

Romanian judoka (born 1957)

Personal information
- Nationality: Romanian
- Born: 4 October 1957 (age 67); Reghin, Romania

Sport
- Sport: Judo

Árpád Szabó (born 4 October 1957) is a Romanian judoka. He competed in the men's extra-lightweight event at the 1980 Summer Olympics.

He was a bronze and silver medalist at the European championships. He also won many national championships, including his sixth in 1982 while competing with a dislocated shoulder.
