= Rui Abreu =

Portuguese swimmer

Personal information
- Full name: Rui de Abreu
- Born: 23 June 1961 Maputo, Portuguese Mozambique
- Died: 1 November 1982 (aged 21) St Vincent Charity Hospital, Cleveland, Ohio, U.S.

Sport
- Sport: Swimming

Rui Abreu (23 June 1961 – 31 October 1982) was a Portuguese backstroke and freestyle swimmer. He competed at the 1976 Summer Olympics and the 1980 Summer Olympics.

Abreu was found unresponsive by his roommate and rushed to hospital in Cleveland, Ohio, where he was pronounced dead. Coroners determined that he had died by suicide by suffocating himself with a plastic bag.
