= John Holliday (judoka) =

British judoka

Personal information
- Nationality: British
- Born: 10 November 1960 (age 64)

Sport
- Sport: Judo

John Holliday (born 10 November 1960) is a British judoka. He competed in the men's extra-lightweight event at the 1980 Summer Olympics.
