= Marian Donat =

Polish judoka (1960–2018)

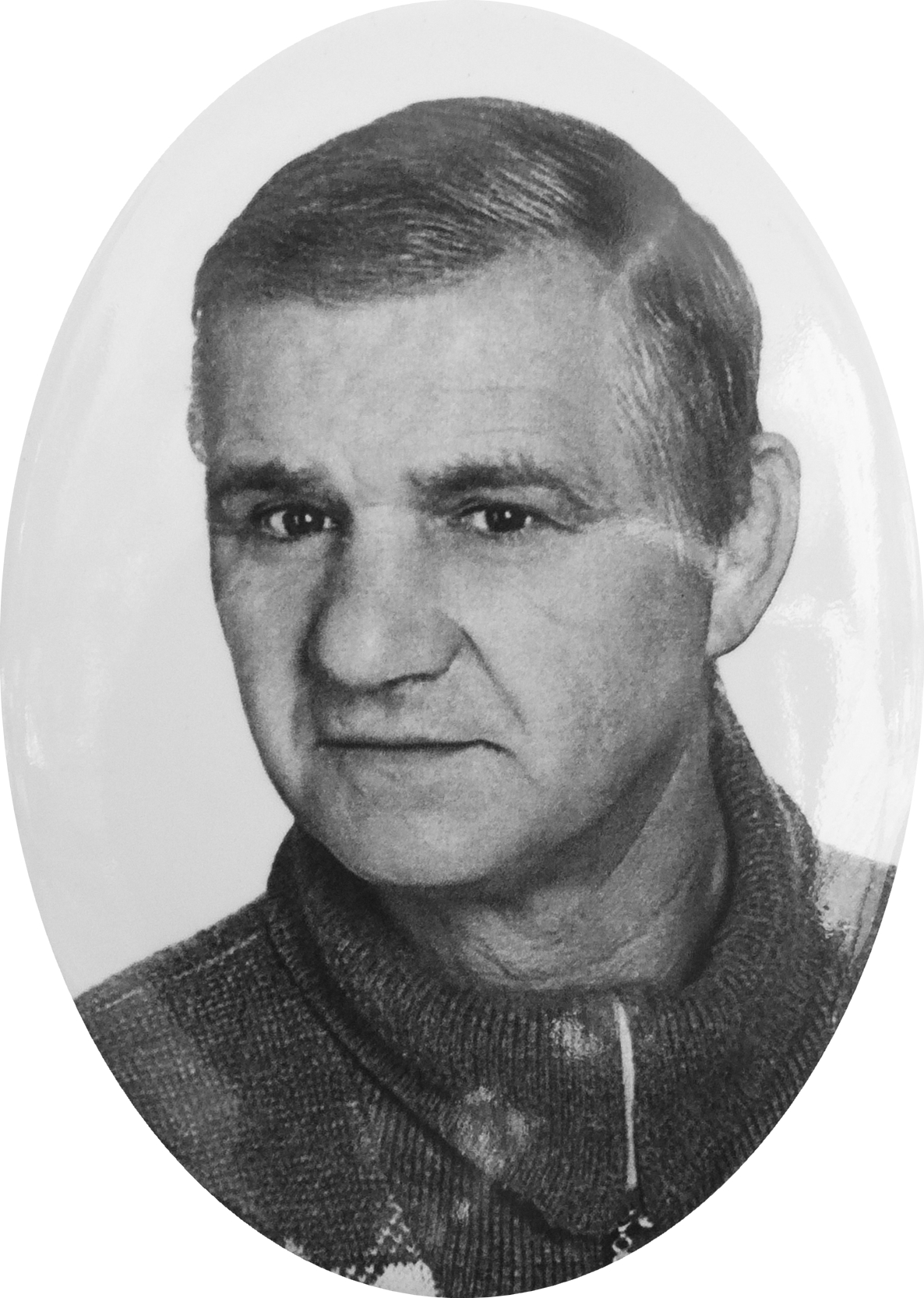

Personal information
- Nationality: Polish
- Born: 28 August 1960; Szczecinek, Poland
- Died: 2 January 2018 (aged 57); Bytom, Poland

Sport
- Sport: Judo

Marian Donat (28 August 1960 – 2 January 2018) was a Polish judoka. He competed in the men's extra-lightweight event at the 1980 Summer Olympics.
