= Spyros Spyrou (judoka) =

Cypriot judoka (born 1956)

Personal information
- Nationality: Cypriot
- Born: 13 April 1956 (age 68)
- Occupation: Judoka

Sport
- Sport: Judo

Profile at external databases
- JudoInside.com: 13115

Spyros Spyrou (born 13 April 1956) is a Cypriot judoka. He competed in the men's extra-lightweight event at the 1980 Summer Olympics.
