= Mihai Cioc =

Romanian judoka (born 1961)

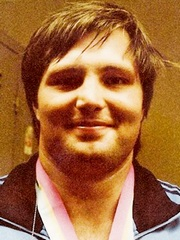

Personal information
- Born: 14 June 1961 (age 65) Turnu Măgurele, Romania
- Occupation: Judoka
- Height: 184 cm (6 ft 0 in)

Sport
- Country: Romania
- Sport: Judo
- Weight class: +95 kg, Open
- Club: Dinamo Brasov

Achievements and titles
- Olympic Games: (bronze) (1984)
- World Champ.: (bronze) (1983)
- European Champ.: (gold) (1987)
Medal record
Men's judo
Representing Romania
Olympic Games
Bronze medal – third place	1984 Los Angeles	Open
World Championships
Bronze medal – third place	1983 Moscow	+95 kg
European Championships
Gold medal – first place	1987 Paris	+95 kg
Bronze medal – third place	1984 Liege	Open
European Cadet Championships
Silver medal – second place	1978 Miskolc	+83 kg
Summer Universiade
Silver medal – second place	1985 Kobe	+95 kg

Profile at external databases
- IJF: 54184
- JudoInside.com: 5716
- Updated on 19 June 2023

Mihai Cioc (born 14 June 1961) is a Romanian retired heavyweight judoka. Competing in the above 95 kg and open weight categories he won the European title in 1987 and bronze medals at the 1983 World Championships, 1984 Olympic Games and 1984 European championships.
