= Clemens Jehle =

Swiss judoka (born 1958)

Personal information
- Born: 16 August 1958 (age 67)
- Occupation: Judoka

Sport
- Country: Switzerland
- Sport: Judo
- Weight class: +95 kg, Open

Achievements and titles
- Olympic Games: R16 (1984)
- World Champ.: 7th (1985, 1987)
- European Champ.: (silver) (1987)
Medal record
Men's judo
Representing Switzerland
European Championships
Silver medal – second place	1987 Paris	+95 kg
Bronze medal – third place	1986 Belgrade	+95 kg
European Junior Championships
Gold medal – first place	1978 Miskolc	+95 kg

Profile at external databases
- IJF: 53782
- JudoInside.com: 6158
- Updated on 9 July 2024

Clemens Jehle (born 16 August 1958) is a Swiss judoka. He competed at the 1984 Summer Olympics and the 1988 Summer Olympics.
