= Samir El-Najjar =

Syrian judoka

Personal information
- Nationality: Syrian
- Born: 2 July 1956 (age 68)

Sport
- Sport: Judo

Samir El-Najjar (Arabic: سمير النجار; born 2 July 1956) is a Syrian judoka. He competed in the men's extra-lightweight event at the 1980 Summer Olympics.
