= Salem Ajjoub =

Syrian weightlifter (born 1953)

Personal information
- Nationality: Syria
- Born: 1 September 1953 (age 71)
- Height: 1.75 m (5 ft 9 in)
- Weight: 90 kg (200 lb)

Sport
- Sport: Weightlifting

Salem Ajjoub (Arabic: سالم عجوب; born 1 September 1953) is a Syrian weightlifter. He competed in the 1980 and 1984 Summer Olympics.
