= Sigurður Bergmann =

Icelandic judoka (born 1961)

Personal information
- Nationality: Icelandic
- Born: 9 March 1961 (age 64)
- Occupation: Judoka

Sport
- Sport: Judo

Profile at external databases
- JudoInside.com: 5295

Sigurður Bergmann (born 9 March 1961) is an Icelandic judoka. He competed at the 1988 Summer Olympics and the 1992 Summer Olympics.
