= Mario Vecchi =

Italian judoka

Personal information
- Nationality: Italian
- Born: 4 September 1957 (age 67); Rieti, Italy

Sport
- Sport: Judo

Mario Vecchi (born 4 September 1957) is an Italian former judoka. He competed at the 1976 Summer Olympics and the 1984 Summer Olympics.
