= Thierry Rey =

French judoka (born 1959)

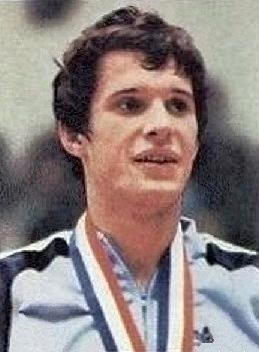
- Rey in 1980

Personal information
- Born: 1 June 1959 (age 67)
- Occupation: Judoka

Sport
- Country: France
- Sport: Judo
- Weight class: ‍–‍60 kg, ‍–‍65 kg
- Rank: 7th dan black belt

Achievements and titles
- Olympic Games: (gold) (1980)
- World Champ.: (gold) (1979)
- European Champ.: (gold) (1983)
Medal record
Men's judo
Representing France
Olympic Games
Gold medal – first place	1980 Moscow	‍–‍60 kg
World Championships
Gold medal – first place	1979 Paris	‍–‍60 kg
European Championships
Gold medal – first place	1983 Paris	‍–‍65 kg
Silver medal – second place	1981 Debrecen	‍–‍65 kg
Silver medal – second place	1982 Rostock	‍–‍65 kg
Bronze medal – third place	1980 Vienna	‍–‍60 kg

Profile at external databases
- IJF: 54202
- JudoInside.com: 5216
- Updated on 19 June 2023

Thierry Rey (born 1 June 1959) is a French judoka, world and olympic champion. He won a gold medal in the extra lightweight (‍–‍60 kg) division at the 1980 Summer Olympics in Moscow. He is the father of Martin Rey-Chirac, as a result of an extramarital relation with Claude Chirac, a daughter of President Jacques Chirac.
