= Mohamed Ali Rashwan =

Egyptian judoka (born 1956)

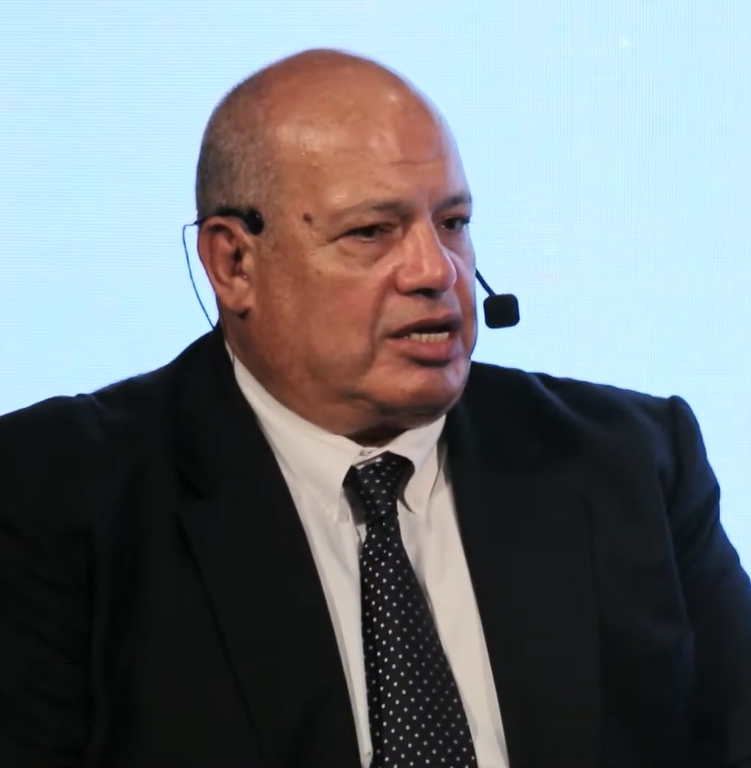
- Rashwan in 2019

Personal information
- Native name: محمد علي رشوان
- Citizenship: Egypt; Japan
- Born: 16 January 1956 (age 70) Alexandria, Egypt
- Occupation: Judoka

Sport
- Country: Egypt
- Sport: Judo
- Weight class: +95 kg, Open

Achievements and titles
- Olympic Games: (silver) (1984)
- World Champ.: (silver) (1985, 1987)
Medal record
Men's judo
Representing Egypt
Olympic Games
Silver medal – second place	1984 Los Angeles	Open
World Championships
Silver medal – second place	1985 Seoul	Open
Silver medal – second place	1987 Essen	+95 kg
Mediterranean Games
Gold medal – first place	1987 Lattaquié	+95 kg
Gold medal – first place	1987 Lattaquié	Open
Bronze medal – third place	1983 Casablanca	Open

Profile at external databases
- IJF: 4534
- JudoInside.com: 4888
- Updated on 19 June 2023

Mohamed Ali Rashwan (Egyptian Arabic: محمد علي رشوان; born 16 January 1956) is an Egyptian judoka. At the 1984 Summer Olympics he won the silver medal in the men's Open Class category.

== Achievements ==
- Winner of fair play international award in 1984
- Silver medallist at the 1985 World Judo Championships in open weight
- Silver medallist at the 1987 World Judo Championships in heavy weight

In 1984, he lost the finals to Japan's Yasuhiro Yamashita, who tore a right calf muscle in the preliminaries. Rashwan stated that he did not aim for Yamashita's right leg because he did not regard that as a fair play, and was subsequently given an award from the International Fair Play Committee.

He also won the gold medal in the heavyweight and open class category in the African Championship in 1982 and 1983.
