= Abderrahim Lahcinia =

Moroccan judoka

Abderrahim Lahsinia
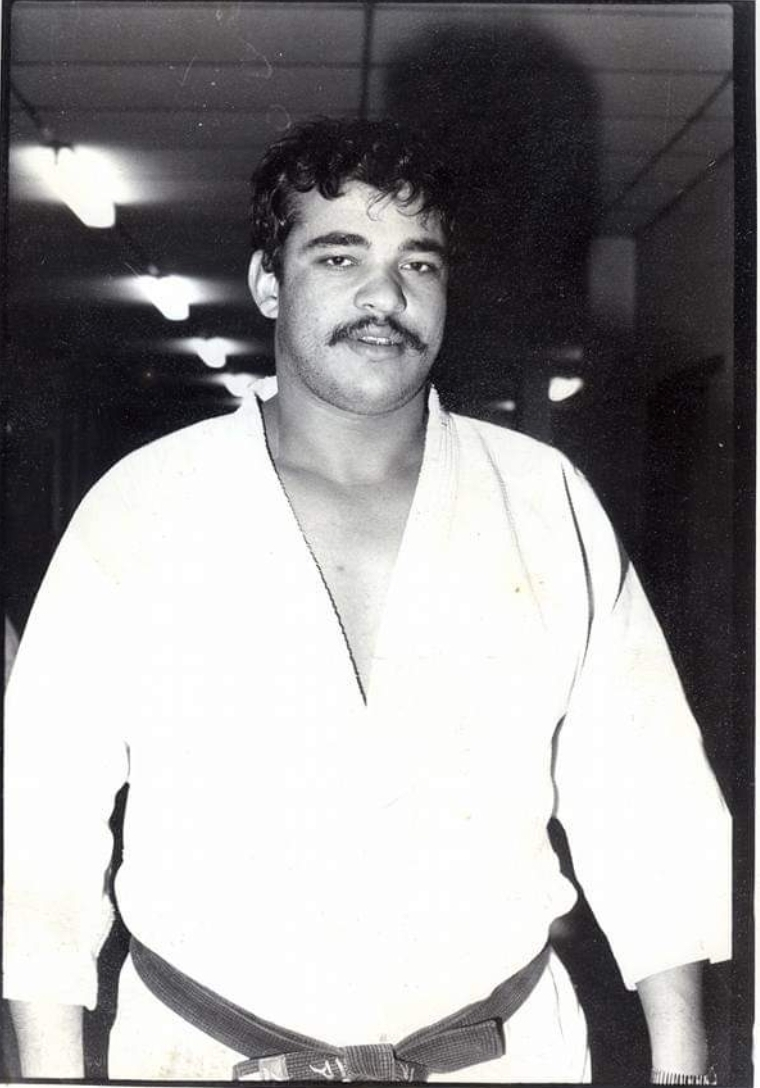

Personal information
- National team: Morocco
- Born: 10 December 1963 (age 61) Khouribga

Sport
- Sport: Judo

Abderrahim Lahsinia (born 10 December 1963 in Khouribga) is a Moroccan judoka. He represented Morocco in the heavyweight category at the 1988 Summer Olympics and, in 1983, won the silver medal in the +95 kg category at the Mediterranean Games in Casablanca.
