= Arthur Schnabel =

German judoka

Personal information
- Born: 16 September 1947
- Died: 22 October 2018 (aged 71)
- Occupation: Judoka

Sport
- Country: West Germany
- Sport: Judo
- Weight class: ‍–‍93 kg, ‍–‍95 kg, Open

Achievements and titles
- Olympic Games: (bronze) (1984)
- World Champ.: 7th (1979)
- European Champ.: (bronze) (1976, 1977, 1981, 1982)
Medal record
Men's judo
Representing West Germany
Olympic Games
Bronze medal – third place	1984 Los Angeles	Open
European Championships
Bronze medal – third place	1976 Kyiv	‍–‍93 kg
Bronze medal – third place	1977 Ludwigshafen	‍–‍95 kg
Bronze medal – third place	1981 Debrecen	Open
Bronze medal – third place	1982 Rostock	Open

Profile at external databases
- IJF: 27355
- JudoInside.com: 4862
- Updated on 19 June 2023

Arthur Schnabel (16 September 1947 – 22 October 2018) was a German judoka. He won a bronze medal in the Open division at the 1984 Summer Olympics. He also competed at the 1976 Summer Olympics. He died in 2018 at the age of 70.
