= José Rodríguez (judoka) =

Cuban Olympic judoka (born 1959)

Personal information
- Full name: José Rafael Rodríguez Carbonell
- Born: 28 March 1959 (age 67)
- Occupation: Judoka

Sport
- Country: Cuba
- Sport: Judo
- Weight class: ‍–‍60 kg

Achievements and titles
- Olympic Games: (silver) (1980)
- World Champ.: 5th (1983)
- Pan American Champ.: (1984)
Medal record
Men's judo
Representing Cuba
Olympic Games
| Silver medal – second place | 1980 Moscow | ‍–‍60 kg |
Pan American Games
| Gold medal – first place | 1983 Caracas | ‍–‍60 kg |
| Bronze medal – third place | 1987 Indianapolis | ‍–‍60 kg |
Pan American Championships
| Silver medal – second place | 1984 Mexico CIty | ‍–‍60 kg |
| Bronze medal – third place | 1985 Havana | ‍–‍60 kg |

Profile at external databases
- IJF: 6955
- JudoInside.com: 988
- Updated on 19 June 2023

José Rafael Rodríguez Carbonell (Note: In this Spanish name, the first or paternal surname is Rodríguez and the second or maternal family name is Carbonell.) (born 28 March 1959) is a Cuban former judoka who competed in the 1980 Summer Olympics.
