= Dewey Mitchell =

American judoka

Dewey Mitchell is a former Olympian for the United States in the sport of judo. He participated in the 1984 Olympic Games, in Los Angeles.
