= João Paulo Mendonça =

Portuguese judoka

Personal information
- Nationality: Portuguese
- Born: 27 May 1958 (age 66)
- Occupation: Judoka

Sport
- Sport: Judo

João Paulo Mendonça (born 27 May 1958) is a Portuguese judoka. He competed in the men's extra-lightweight event at the 1980 Summer Olympics.
