= Naji Keyrouz =

Lebanese judoka (1960–2019)

Jihad "Naji" Keyrouz
Personal information
- Nationality: Lebanese
- Born: 4 April 1960; Beirut, Lebanon
- Died: 4 February 2019 (aged 58); San Antonio, Texas, United States

Sport
- Sport: Judo

Jihad "Naji" Keyrouz (4 April 1960 – 4 February 2019) was a Lebanese judoka. He competed in the men's extra-Lightweight event at the 1980 Summer Olympics.
