= Adnan Houjeij =

Syrian sports shooter

Personal information
- Nationality: Syrian
- Born: 3 October 1933 (age 92)

Sport
- Sport: Sports shooting

Adnan Houjeij (born 3 October 1933) is a Syrian sports shooter. He competed in the mixed trap event at the 1980 Summer Olympics. He also competed at the 1979 Mediterranean Games and finished fourth in his event; for his performance, the Syrian government gave him a reward of 1000 pounds.
