= Charles Chibwe =

Zambian judoka

Personal information
- Nationality: Zambian
- Born: 1962
- Died: 2 April 1983 (aged 21); Livingstone, Zambia

Sport
- Sport: Judo

Charles Chibwe (1962 – 2 April 1983) was a Zambian judoka. He competed in the men's extra-lightweight event at the 1980 Summer Olympics. He was killed when the car he was in crashed into the Zambezi river.
