= Stanislav Tůma =

Czech former wrestler (born 1948)

Stanislav Tůma (born 5 September 1948) is a Czech former wrestler who competed in the 1972 Summer Olympics.
