= Juha Salonen =

Finnish judoka

Personal information
- Nationality: Finnish
- Born: 16 October 1961 (age 63); Loimaa, Finland

Sport
- Sport: Judo

Juha Salonen (born 16 October 1961) is a Finnish judoka. He competed at the 1984, 1988 and the 1992 Summer Olympics.
