= Reino Fagerlund =

Finnish judoka (1953–2019)

Personal information
- Nationality: Finnish
- Born: 28 December 1953; Pori, Finland
- Died: 9 October 2019 (aged 65); Pori, Finland
- Occupation: Judoka

Sport
- Sport: Judo

Profile at external databases
- IJF: 54201
- JudoInside.com: 13116

Reino Kalevi Fagerlund (28 December 1953 – 9 October 2019) was a Finnish judoka. He competed in the men's extra-lightweight event at the 1980 Summer Olympics.
