= Yoko shiho gatame =

Judo technique

- Classification: Katame-waza
- Sub classification: Osaekomi-waza
- Grip: Side control
- Kodokan: Yes

Technique name
- Rōmaji: Yoko shiho gatame
- Japanese: 横四方固め
- English: Side four quarter hold

Yoko-shiho-gatame (横四方固め) is one of the seven mat holds, Osaekomi-waza, of Kodokan Judo. In grappling terms, it is categorized as a side control hold.

== Technique description ==
Graphic from http://judoinfo.com/techdrw.htm

Exemplar Videos:

Demonstrated from https://web.archive.org/web/20060913144731/http://www.abbotsfordjudo.com/techniques/5thkyu.htm

== Escapes ==
- Roll Away Yoko-Shiho-Gatame Escape
- Roll Inward (Turn On Knees) Yoko-Shiho-Gatame Escape
- Sankaku/Armbar Yoko-Shiho-Gatame Escape

== Technique history ==
During Yasuhiro Yamashita’s winning streak of 203 consecutive victories in international competition in the 1970s and 1980s, yoko shiho gatame was his highest scoring single technique, securing victory in 45 of those contests.

== Included systems ==
Systems:

- Kodokan Judo, Judo Lists

Lists:

- The Canon Of Judo
- Judo technique

== Similar techniques, variants, and aliases ==
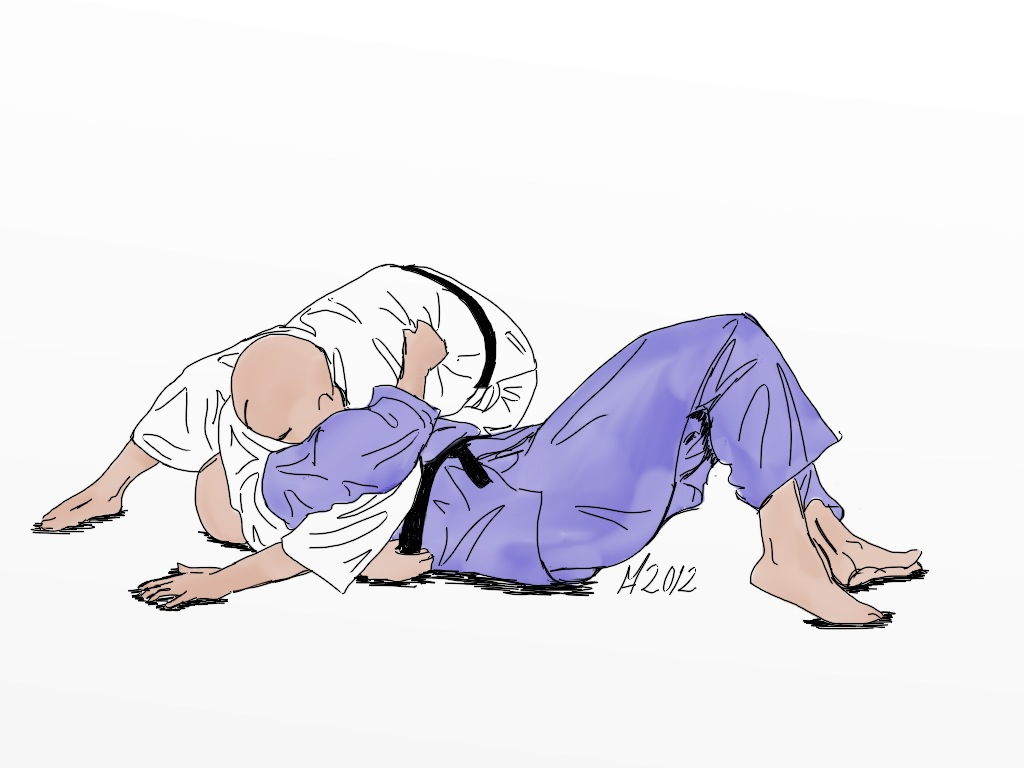
Illustration of Mune Gatame

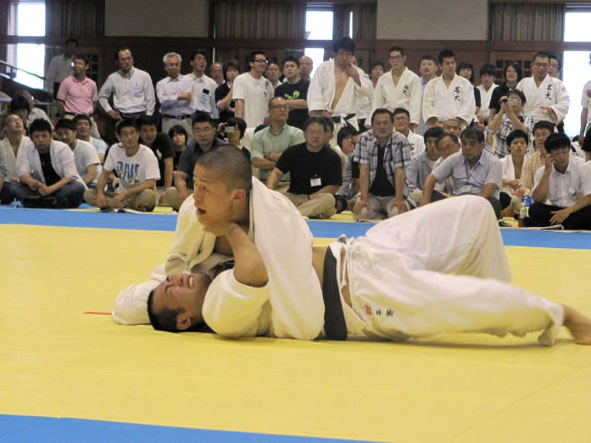
Mune Atama Gatame

English aliases:

- Side four quarter hold
- Side lock pin
- Side locking four-corner hold

Variants:

- Second variation

Kyuzo Mifune also demonstrates a second variation of Yoko-Shiho-Gatame in the video, The Essence Of Judo, performed from a Stacking Guard Pass.

- Modified Yoko-Shiho-Gatame
- Mune Gatame
- Mune Atama Gatame
- Kata Osae Gatame
