= Lansana Coly =

Senegalese judoka (born 1958)

Personal information
- Nationality: Senegalese
- Born: 15 February 1958 (age 67)

Sport
- Sport: Judo

Lansana Coly (born 15 February 1958) is a Senegalese judoka. He competed at the 1984 Summer Olympics and the 1988 Summer Olympics.
