= Wojciech Reszko =

Polish judoka

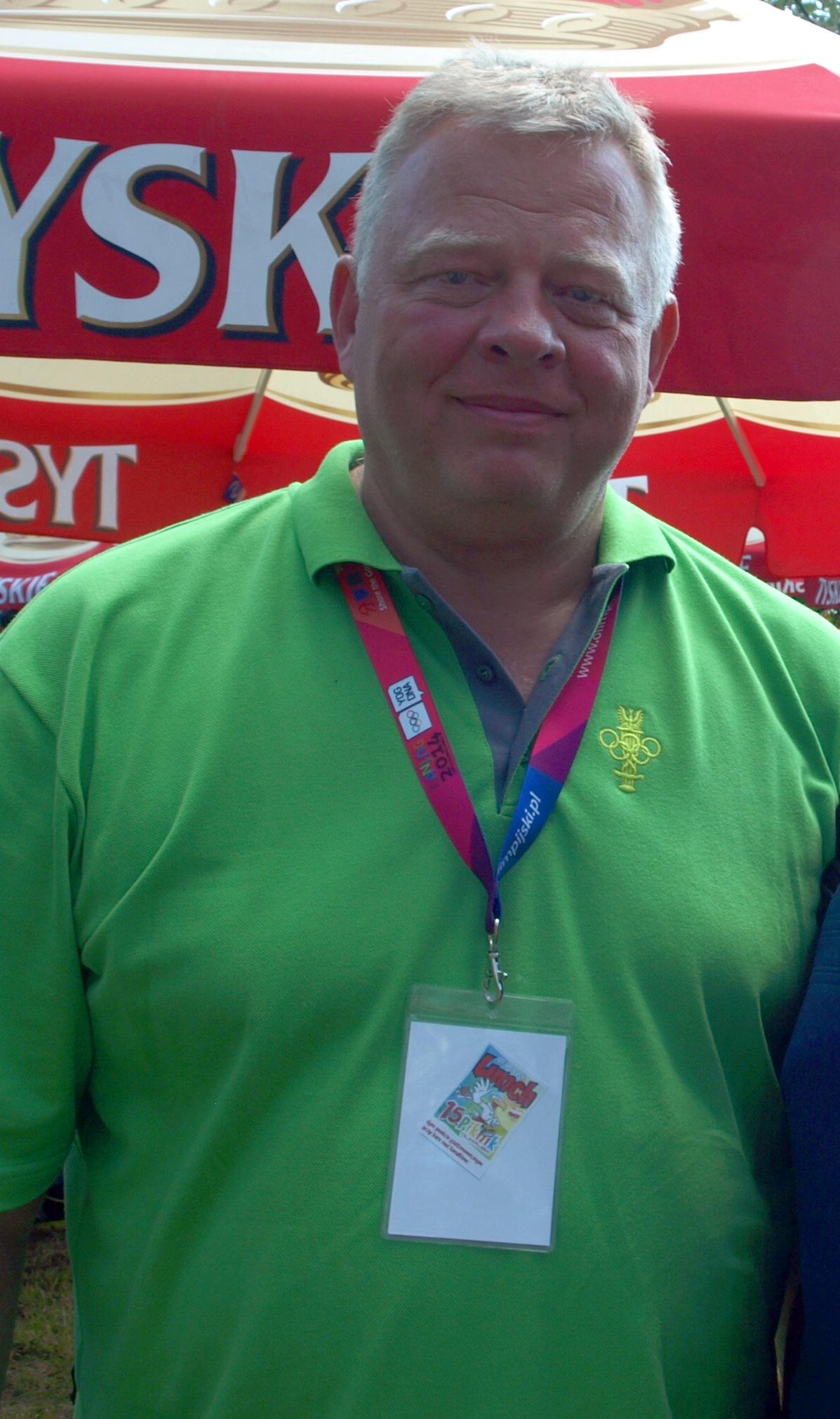
- Reszko in 2014

Personal information
- Nationality: Polish
- Born: 30 October 1956 (age 69) Szczecin, Poland
- Occupation: Judoka

Sport
- Sport: Judo
Medal record
Men's Judo
Friendship Games
Bronze medal – third place	1984 Moscow	Open category

Profile at external databases
- JudoInside.com: 1158

Wojciech Reszko (born 30 October 1956) is a Polish judoka. He competed in the men's heavyweight event at the 1980 Summer Olympics.
