= O soto gari =

Judo technique

O soto gari 大外刈
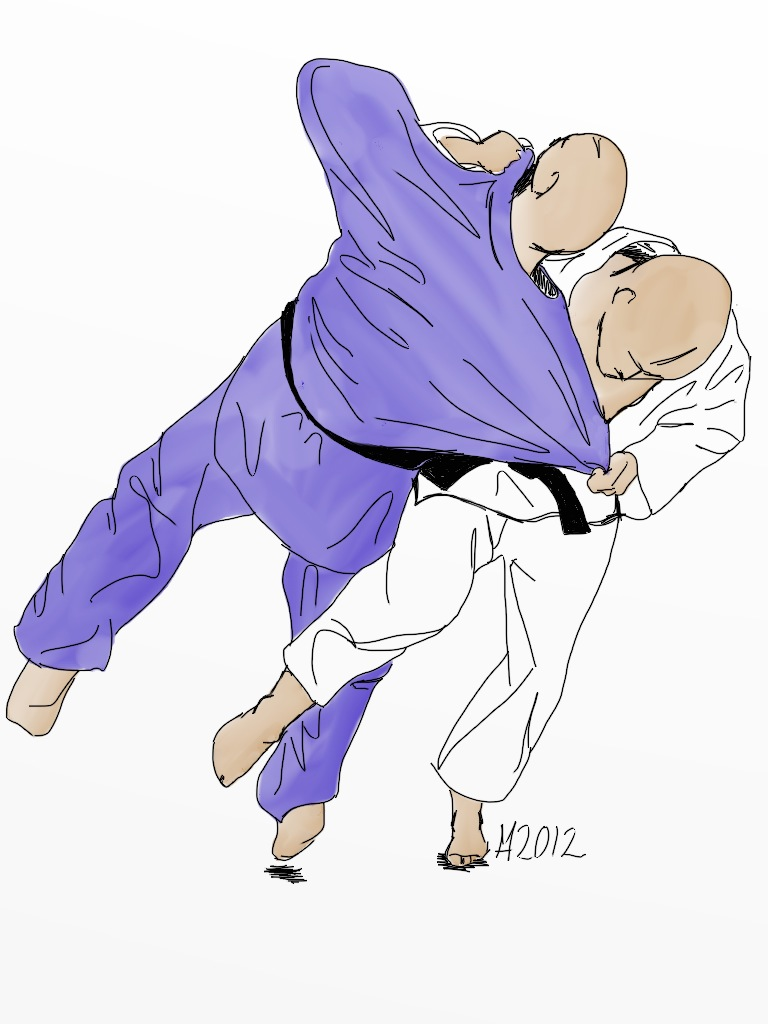
- An illustration of o soto gari
- Classification: Nage waza
- Sub classification: Ashi waza
- Targets: Leg
- Counter: Osoto gaeshi
- Kodokan: yes

Technique name
- Rōmaji: O soto gari
- Japanese: 大外刈
- English: major outer reap, or large outer reap
- Korean: 밭다리 후리기

O soto gari (大外刈) is one of the original 40 throws of Judo as developed by Jigoro Kano. It belongs to the first group, Dai Ikkyo, of the traditional throwing list, Gokyo no waza, of Kodokan Judo. It is also included in the current 67 Throws of Kodokan Judo. It is classified as a foot technique, Ashi-Waza.

== Technique description ==
In a classical right-handed osotogari, tori steps next to uke with his left leg and reaps uke's right leg (at the back of the thigh) with his right leg.

== Similar techniques, variants, and aliases ==
English aliases:

- large outer reap

Similar techniques:

- o soto otoshi
- o soto gaeshi
- o soto guruma
- o soto gake
- O uchi gari, major inner reap
- Ko soto gari, minor outer reap
