= Okuri eri jime =

Judo technique

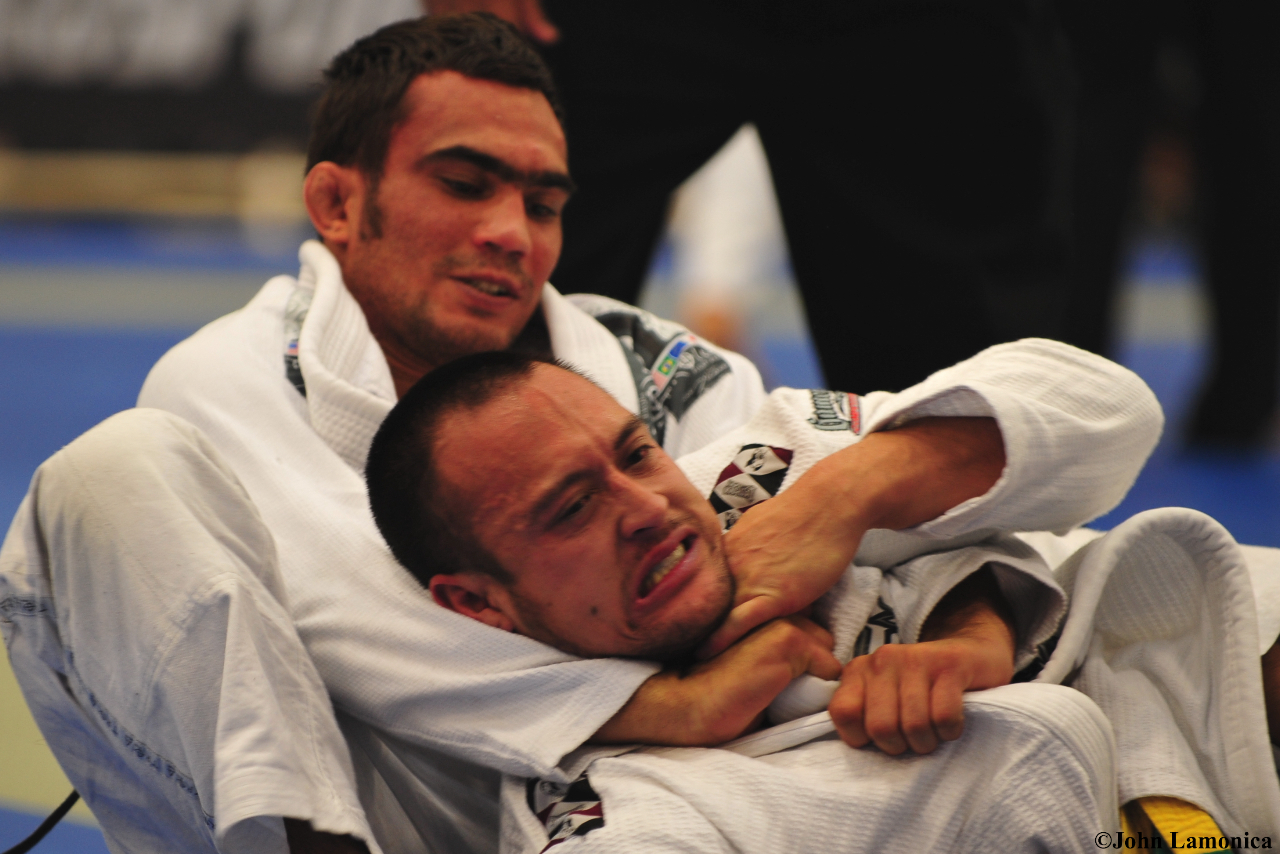
- BJJ blackbelt Lucas Leite executing a gi choke on his opponent at the 2009 Pan-American Jiu-Jitsu championship
- Classification: Katame-waza
- Sub classification: Shime-waza
- Targets: Carotid arteries
- Kodokan: Yes

Technique name
- Rōmaji: Okuri eri jime
- Japanese: 送襟絞
- English: Sliding lapel strangle

Okuri-Eri-Jime (送襟絞) is one of the twelve constriction techniques of Kodokan Judo in the Shime-waza list.

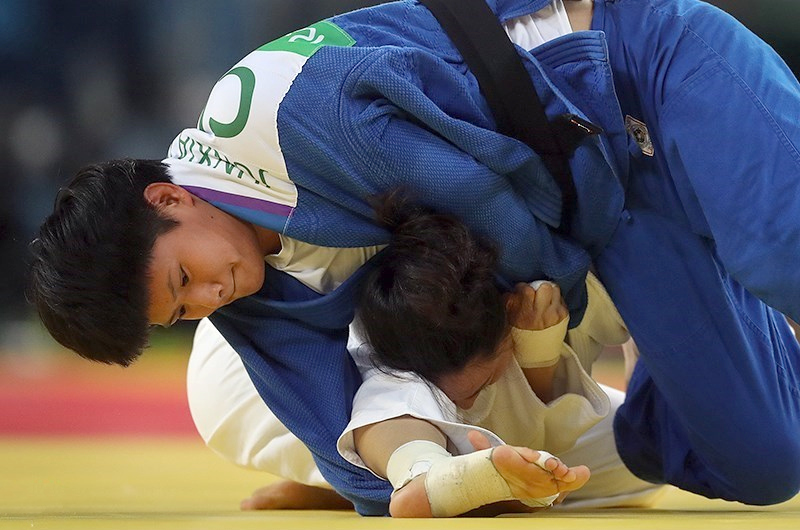
Yang Junxia tries Yoko jime at the 2016 Olympics

Jigoku jime from the crucifix position being demonstrated by Eduardo de Lima

== Description ==
In English this technique can be translated as "sliding lapel strangle".

== Escapes ==
Brazilian Jiu-Jitsu, Theory And Technique, by Renzo & Royler Gracie, describes the footlock counter to the backmount.

== Included systems ==
Systems:

- Kodokan Judo, Judo Lists

Lists:

- The Canon Of Judo
- Judo technique

== Similar techniques, variants, and aliases ==
=== variants ===
- Yoko jime(横絞)
- Tawara-Jime(俵絞)

Kyuzo Mifune demonstrates Tawara-Jime in The Essence of Judo and it is described in The Canon Of Judo.

- Jigoku jime

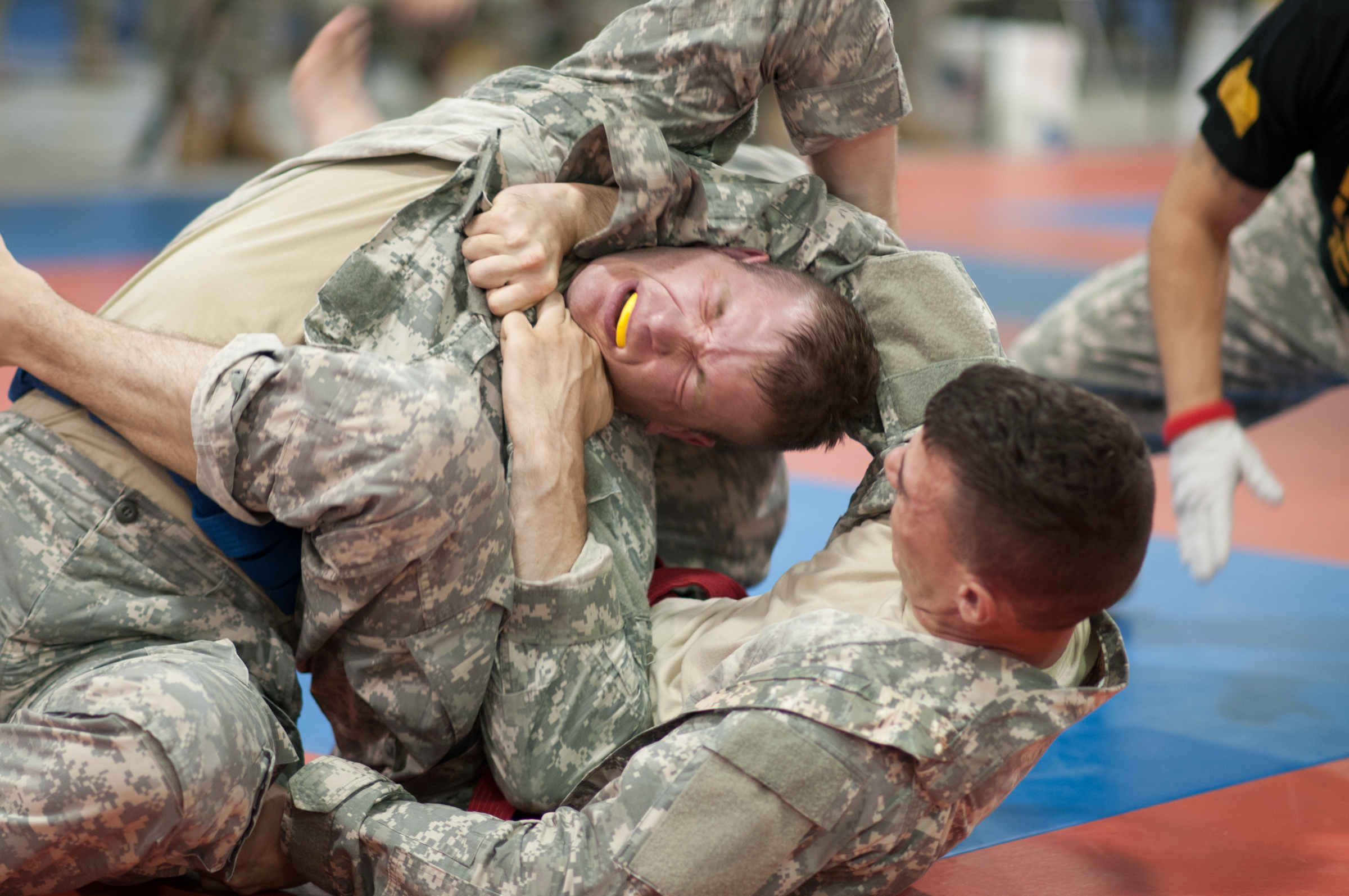
Bow and arrow choke

- Bow and arrow choke

The most frequent choke hold in the 21st-century judo world.

- Nezumi tori (ねずみとり)

Examples of a contest this finished

- Judo at the 1964 Summer Olympics Men's Middleweight Knockout rounds Quarterfinal (1964-10-22)

Win Isao Okano (Japan) (5:18 Okuri eri jime) Lionel Grossain (France) Loss

- Kote jime (小手絞), Ude shibori (腕絞り)

Examples of a contest this finished

- 2017 Judo World Championships U57 kg Round 3

Win Hélène Receveaux (France) (1:49 Okuri eri jime) Yunseo JI(South Korea) Loss IJF movie

=== Alias ===
- Sliding collar choke
