= Laurent del Colombo =

French judoka

Personal information
- Nationality: French
- Born: 27 April 1959 (age 67)

Sport
- Sport: Judo

Laurent del Colombo (born 27 April 1959) is a French judoka. He competed in the men's open category event at the 1984 Summer Olympics.
