= Judo at the 1976 Summer Olympics – Men's 80 kg =

Olympic judo tournament

Men's 80 kg at the Games of the XXI Olympiad
- Venue: Olympic Velodrome
- Date: 28 July 1976
- Competitors: 27 from 27 nations

Medalists
| 1st place, gold medalist(s) | | Isamu Sonoda | Japan |
| 2nd place, silver medalist(s) | | Valeriy Dvoinikov | Soviet Union |
| 3rd place, bronze medalist(s) | | Park Young-chul | South Korea |
| 3rd place, bronze medalist(s) | | Slavko Obadov | Yugoslavia |

The men's 80 kg competition in judo at the 1976 Summer Olympics in Montreal was held on 28 July at the Olympic Velodrome. The gold medal was won by Isamu Sonoda of Japan.

== Results ==
=== Main brackets ===
==== Pool A ====
Round of 32
Assane N'Doye (SEN) | L
Carlos Motta (BRA) | W
Ibrahim Muzaffer (KUW) | L
Brian Jacks (GBR) | W
Slavko Obadov (YUG) | W
Detlef Ultsch (GDR) | L
Daniel Guldemont (BEL) | L
Adam Adamczyk (POL) | W
José Luis de Frutos (ESP) | W
Viðar Guðjohnsen (ISL) | L
Fritz Kaiser (LIE) | L
Walter Huber (VEN) | W
Valeriy Dvoinikov (URS) | W
Ricardo Elmont (SUR) | L
Pedro Santos (PUR) | L
Süheyl Yesilnur (TUR) | W

Round of 16
Carlos Motta (BRA) | L
Brian Jacks (GBR) | W
Slavko Obadov (YUG) | W
Adam Adamczyk (POL) | L
José Luis de Frutos (ESP) | W
Walter Huber (VEN) | L
Valeriy Dvoinikov (URS) | W
Süheyl Yesilnur (TUR) | L

Quarterfinal
Brian Jacks (GBR) | L
Slavko Obadov (YUG) | W
José Luis de Frutos (ESP) | L
Valeriy Dvoinikov (URS) | W

Semifinal
Slavko Obadov (YUG) | L
Valeriy Dvoinikov (URS) | W

==== Pool B ====
Round of 32
Endre Kiss (HUN) | W
Rainer Fischer (CAN) | L
Park Young-chul (KOR) | WO
Bertil Ström (SWE) | DNS
Kiril Petkov (BUL) | DNS
Jong In-chol (PRK) | WO
Paul Buganey (AUS) | L
Isamu Sonoda (JPN) | W
Fred Marhenke (FRG) | W
Gandolgoryn Batsükh (MGL) | L
El Arabi El Jamali (MAR) | DNS
Jean-Paul Coche (FRA) | WO
Christop Tchagou (CMR) | DNS
Jurek Jatowitt (AUT) | WO
Abinem Dara (MLI) | DNS
Teimoc Jonston-Ono (USA) | WO

Round of 16
Endre Kiss (HUN) | L
Park Young-chul (KOR) | W
Jong In-chol (PRK) | L
Isamu Sonoda (JPN) | W
Fred Marhenke (FRG) | W
Jean-Paul Coche (FRA) | L
Jurek Jatowitt (AUT) | W
Teimoc Jonston-Ono (USA) | L

Quarterfinal
Park Young-chul (KOR) | L
Isamu Sonoda (JPN) | W
Fred Marhenke (FRG) | W
Jurek Jatowitt (AUT) | L

Semifinal
Isamu Sonoda (JPN) | W
Fred Marhenke (FRG) | L

=== Repechages ===
==== Repechage A ====
| Repechage | | Repechage semifinal | | Repechage final |
| Ricardo Elmont (SUR) | L |
| Süheyl Yesilnur (TUR) | W | Süheyl Yesilnur (TUR) | L |
| | | José Luis de Frutos (ESP) | W |
| | | | | José Luis de Frutos (ESP) | L |
| | | | | Slavko Obadov (YUG) | W |

==== Repechage B ====
| Repechage | | Repechage semifinal | | Repechage final |
| Paul Buganey (AUS) | W |
| Jong In-chol (PRK) | L | Paul Buganey (AUS) | L |
| | | Park Young-chul (KOR) | W |
| | | | | Park Young-chul (KOR) | W |
| | | | | Fred Marhenke (FRG) | L |

=== Finals ===
Semi-finals
Slavko Obadov (YUG) | L
Valeriy Dvoinikov (URS) | W
Isamu Sonoda (JPN) | W
Fred Marhenke (FRG) | L

Final
Valeriy Dvoinikov (URS) | L
Isamu Sonoda (JPN) | W

== Final classification ==
| Rank | Name | Country |
|---|---|---|
| 1st place, gold medalist(s) | Isamu Sonoda | Japan |
| 2nd place, silver medalist(s) | Valeriy Dvoinikov | Soviet Union |
| 3rd place, bronze medalist(s) | Park Young-chul | South Korea |
| 3rd place, bronze medalist(s) | Slavko Obadov | Yugoslavia |
| 5T | José Luis de Frutos | Spain |
| 5T | Fred Marhenke | West Germany |
| 7T | Paul Buganey | Australia |
| 7T | Süheyl Yesilnur | Turkey |
| 9T | Ricardo Elmont | Suriname |
| 9T | Jong In-chol | North Korea |
| 11T | Brian Jacks | Great Britain |
| 11T | Jurek Jatowitt | Austria |
| 13T | Carlos Motta | Brazil |
| 13T | Walter Huber | Venezuela |
| 13T | Jean-Paul Coche | France |
| 13T | Endre Kiss | Hungary |
| 13T | Teimoc Jonston-Ono | United States |
| 13T | Adam Adamczyk | Poland |
| 19T | Assane N'Doye | Senegal |
| 19T | Ibrahim Muzaffer | Kuwait |
| 19T | Daniel Guldemont | Belgium |
| 19T | Viðar Guðjohnsen | Iceland |
| 19T | Fritz Kaiser | Liechtenstein |
| 19T | Pedro Santos | Puerto Rico |
| 19T | Rainer Fischer | Canada |
| 19T | Gandolgoryn Batsükh | Mongolia |
| 19T | Detlef Ultsch | East Germany |
