= Judo at the 1976 Summer Olympics – Men's open category =

Men's open category at the Games of the XXI Olympiad
- Venue: Olympic Velodrome
- Date: 31 July 1976
- Competitors: 23 from 23 nations

Medalists
1st place, gold medalist(s)		Haruki Uemura	Japan
2nd place, silver medalist(s)		Keith Remfry	Great Britain
3rd place, bronze medalist(s)		Shota Chochishvili	Soviet Union
3rd place, bronze medalist(s)		Jo Jae-gi	South Korea

The men's open category competition in judo at the 1976 Summer Olympics in Montreal was held on 31 July at the Olympic Velodrome. The gold medal was won by Haruki Uemura of Japan.

== Results ==
=== Main brackets ===
==== Pool A ====
Round of 32
Jimmy Wooley (USA)	W
Hans-Jakob Schädler (LIE)	L
Tom Greenway (CAN)	L
Vladimír Novák (TCH)	W
Radomir Kovacevic (YUG)	W
Markku Airio (FIN)	L
José Luis de Frutos (ESP)	DNS
Shota Chochishvili (URS)	WO
Jean-Luc Rougé (FRA)	W
Waldemar Zausz (POL)	L
Geoffrey Sankies (GUY)	DNS
Gal Choidog (MGL)	DNS
José Cornavaca (NCA)	L
Pak Jong-gil (PRK)	W

Round of 16
Jimmy Wooley (USA)	L
Vladimír Novák (TCH)	W
Radomir Kovacevic (YUG)	L
Shota Chochishvili (URS)	W
Jean-Luc Rougé (FRA)	WO
No opponent	–
Pak Jong-gil (PRK)	L
Haruki Uemura (JPN)	W

Quarterfinal
Vladimír Novák (TCH)	L
Shota Chochishvili (URS)	W
Jean-Luc Rougé (FRA)	L
Haruki Uemura (JPN)	W

Semifinal
Shota Chochishvili (URS)	L
Haruki Uemura (JPN)	W

==== Pool B ====
Round of 32
Jorge Portelli (ARG)	WO
Jaime Felipa (AHO)	DNS
José Ibañez (CUB)	WO
Johnny Mackay (ECU)	DNS
José Chandri (PUR)	L
Johan Schåltz (SWE)	W
Mario Daminelli (ITA)	DNS
Klaus Wallas (AUT)	WO
Imre Varga (HUN)	WO
Dietmar Lorenz (GDR)	DNS
Jo Jae-gi (KOR)	WO
Mohamed Zouagh (MAR)	DNS
Günther Neureuther (FRG)	W
Abdoulaye Djiba (SEN)	L

Round of 16
Jorge Portelli (ARG)	W
José Ibañez (CUB)	L
Johan Schåltz (SWE)	L
Klaus Wallas (AUT)	W
Imre Varga (HUN)	L
Jo Jae-gi (KOR)	W
Günther Neureuther (FRG)	L
Keith Remfry (GBR)	W

Quarterfinal
Jorge Portelli (ARG)	W
Klaus Wallas (AUT)	L
Jo Jae-gi (KOR)	L
Keith Remfry (GBR)	W

Semifinal
Jorge Portelli (ARG)	L
Keith Remfry (GBR)	W

=== Repechages ===
==== Repechage A ====
Repechage	Repechage semifinal		Repechage final
	Pak Jong-gil (PRK)	L
	Jean-Luc Rougé (FRA)	W
			Jean-Luc Rougé (FRA)	L
			Shota Chochishvili (URS)	W

==== Repechage B ====
Repechage	Repechage semifinal		Repechage final
	Günther Neureuther (FRG)	L
	Jo Jae-gi (KOR)	W
			Jo Jae-gi (KOR)	W
			Jorge Portelli (ARG)	L

=== Finals ===
Semi-finals
Shota Chochishvili (URS)	L
Haruki Uemura (JPN)	W
Jorge Portelli (ARG)	L
Keith Remfry (GBR)	W

Final
Haruki Uemura (JPN)	W
Keith Remfry (GBR)	L

== Final classification ==
Rank	Name	Country
1st place, gold medalist(s)	Haruki Uemura	Japan
2nd place, silver medalist(s)	Keith Remfry	Great Britain
3rd place, bronze medalist(s)	Shota Chochishvili	Soviet Union
3rd place, bronze medalist(s)	Jo Jae-gi	South Korea
5T	Jorge Portelli	Argentina
5T	Jean-Luc Rougé	France
7T	Pak Jong-gil	North Korea
7T	Günther Neureuther	West Germany
9T	Vladimír Novák	Czechoslovakia
9T	Klaus Wallas	Austria
11T	Jimmy Wooley	United States
11T	Radomir Kovacevic	Yugoslavia
11T	Imre Varga	Hungary
11T	José Ibañez	Cuba
11T	Johan Schåltz	Sweden
16T	Hans-Jakob Schädler	Liechtenstein
16T	Tom Greenway	Canada
16T	Markku Airio	Finland
16T	José Chandri	Puerto Rico
16T	Waldemar Zausz	Poland
16T	Dietmar Lorenz	East Germany
16T	José Cornavaca	Nicaragua
16T	Abdoulaye Djiba	Senegal
