= Judo at the 1976 Summer Olympics – Men's 93 kg =

Olympic judo tournament

Men's 93 kg at the Games of the XXI Olympiad
- Venue: Olympic Velodrome
- Date: 27 July 1976
- Competitors: 32 from 32 nations

Medalists
1st place, gold medalist(s)		Kazuhiro Ninomiya	Japan
2nd place, silver medalist(s)		Ramaz Kharshiladze	Soviet Union
3rd place, bronze medalist(s)		David Starbrook	Great Britain
3rd place, bronze medalist(s)		Jürg Röthlisberger	Switzerland

The men's 93 kg competition in judo at the 1976 Summer Olympics in Montreal was held on 27 July at the Olympic Velodrome. The gold medal was won by Kazuhiro Ninomiya of Japan.

== Results ==
=== Main brackets ===
==== Pool A ====
Round of 64
Carlos Pacheco (BRA)	W
Mario Vecchi (ITA)	L
Joseph Meli (CAN)	L
Arthur Schnabel (FRG)	W

Round of 32
Carlos Pacheco (BRA)	W
José Ibañez (CUB)	L
Jean-Luc Rougé (FRA)	W
José Cornavaca (NCA)	L
Mohamed Zouagh (MAR)	DNS
David Starbrook (GBR)	WO
Jorge Portelli (ARG)	W
Dambajavyn Tsend–Ayuush (MGL)	L
Arthur Schnabel (FRG)	W
László Ipacs (HUN)	L
Abdoulaye Djiba (SEN)	WO
Henri Lobe (CMR)	DNS
Ramaz Kharshiladze (URS)	WO
Geoffrey Sankies (GUY)	DNS
Willem Maduro (AHO)	L
Jo Jae-gi (KOR)	W

Round of 16
Carlos Pacheco (BRA)	L
Jean-Luc Rougé (FRA)	W
David Starbrook (GBR)	W
Jorge Portelli (ARG)	L
Arthur Schnabel (FRG)	L
Abdoulaye Djiba (SEN)	W
Ramaz Kharshiladze (URS)	W
Jo Jae-gi (KOR)	L

Quarterfinal
Jean-Luc Rougé (FRA)	L
David Starbrook (GBR)	W
Abdoulaye Djiba (SEN)	L
Ramaz Kharshiladze (URS)	W

Semifinal
David Starbrook (GBR)	L
Ramaz Kharshiladze (URS)	W

==== Pool B ====
Round of 64
Robert Van de Walle (BEL)	W
Goran Žuvela (YUG)	L

Round of 32
Robert Van de Walle (BEL)	L
Dietmar Lorenz (GDR)	W
Paul Büchel (LIE)	L
Antoni Reiter (POL)	W
Kazuhiro Ninomiya (JPN)	W
Fahed Salem (KUW)	L
An Ung-nam (PRK)	W
Tsancho Atanasov (BUL)	L
Eliudis Benítez (PUR)	L
Jürg Röthlisberger (SUI)	W
Gísli Þorsteinsson (ISL)	L
Thomas Martin (USA)	W
Johann Pollak (AUT)	L
Johan Schåltz (SWE)	W
Koh Eng Kian (SIN)	L
Jorge Comrie (PAN)	W

Round of 16
Dietmar Lorenz (GDR)	W
Antoni Reiter (POL)	L
Kazuhiro Ninomiya (JPN)	W
An Ung-nam (PRK)	L
Jürg Röthlisberger (SUI)	W
Thomas Martin (USA)	L
Johan Schåltz (SWE)	W
Jorge Comrie (PAN)	L

Quarterfinal
Dietmar Lorenz (GDR)	L
Kazuhiro Ninomiya (JPN)	W
Jürg Röthlisberger (SUI)	W
Johan Schåltz (SWE)	L

Semifinal
Kazuhiro Ninomiya (JPN)	W
Jürg Röthlisberger (SUI)	L

=== Repechages ===
==== Repechage A ====
Repechage	Repechage semifinal		Repechage final
	Jo Jae-gi (KOR)	W
	Abdoulaye Djiba (SEN)	L
			Jo Jae-gi (KOR)	L
			David Starbrook (GBR)	W

==== Repechage B ====
Repechage		Repechage semifinal		Repechage final
An Ung-nam (PRK)	W
Fahed Salem (KUW)	L	An Ung-nam (PRK)	L
		Dietmar Lorenz (GDR)	W
				Dietmar Lorenz (GDR)	L
				Jürg Röthlisberger (SUI)	W

=== Finals ===
Semi-finals
David Starbrook (GBR)	L
Ramaz Kharshiladze (URS)	W
Kazuhiro Ninomiya (JPN)	W
Jürg Röthlisberger (SUI)	L

Final
Ramaz Kharshiladze (URS)	L
Kazuhiro Ninomiya (JPN)	W

== Final classification ==
Rank	Name	Country
1	Kazuhiro Ninomiya	Japan
2	Ramaz Kharshiladze	Soviet Union
3T	David Starbrook	Great Britain
3T	Jürg Röthlisberger	Switzerland
5T	Jo Jae-gi	South Korea
5T	Dietmar Lorenz	East Germany
7T	An Ung-nam	North Korea
7T	Abdoulaye Djiba	Senegal
9T	Fahed Salem	Kuwait
10T	Jean-Luc Rougé	France
10T	Johan Schåltz	Sweden
12T	Carlos Pacheco	Brazil
12T	Jorge Portelli	Argentina
12T	Arthur Schnabel	West Germany
12T	Tommy Martin	United States
12T	Antoni Reiter	Poland
12T	Jorge Comrie	Panama
18T	José Ibañez	Cuba
18T	José Cornavaca	Nicaragua
18T	Dambajavyn Tsend–Ayuush	Mongolia
18T	László Ipacs	Hungary
18T	Willem Maduro	Netherlands Antilles
18T	Robert Van de Walle	Belgium
18T	Paul Büchel	Liechtenstein
18T	Koh Eng Kian	Singapore
18T	Tsancho Atanasov	Bulgaria
18T	Eliudis Benítez	Puerto Rico
18T	Gísli Þorsteinsson	Iceland
18T	Johann Pollak	Austria
30T	Goran Žuvela	Yugoslavia
30T	Mario Vecchi	Italy
30T	Joseph Meli	Canada
