= Teiko Ito =

American-born dancer

- Born: June 14, 1913; Asbury Park, New Jersey
- Died: 1958 (aged 44–45)
- Other names: Teiko Ono, Tei Ko
- Occupation: Dancer
- Known for: Folk Dance
- Spouse: Yuji Ito (married 1932)
- Children: Teiji Ito; Genji Ito; Teimoc Johnston-Ono

Teiko Ito (Teiko Ono, 1913–1958) was an American-born dancer who performed interpretations of European and Asian folk dances.

== Personal life ==
Born Teiko (sometimes spelled Tai-ko) Winifred Ono in New Jersey to Japanese parents, she spent part of her childhood in Asia. In 1932, in New York, she married Yuji Ito, a musician and theatrical designer. He designed props, scenery, and costumes for her productions as well as for many others, including the costumes of the Tin man, Cowardly Lion and Scarecrow for The Wizard of Oz. Many of Yuji's family members were dancers, performers, and musicians in both Japan and the United States. Yuji's brother Michio Ito was a dancer, and his cousin Jerry Ito was an actor. After marrying, Teiko and Yuji spent time touring and performing in Asia. They had their first son, Teiji Ito in 1935, while living in Tokyo.

In 1941, six months before the attack on Pearl Harbor, the family emigrated from Tokyo to the United States. To avoid forced internment during World War II, Teiko adopted the name Tei Ko (sometimes Tei-Ko), and dropped “Ito.” This allowed her to pass as Korean, and to continue performing across the United States throughout the war.

Teiji became a composer for theater and film. He died in 1982. Teiko had two other sons, Genji Ito (1946–2001), a resident composer at La Mama Theater, and Teimoc Johnston-Ono (1955-), an Olympic judo competitor and instructor.

== Career ==
Teiko studied the dance traditions of China, Korea, Java, Bali, Burman, Thailand, and Japan. In the 1920s, while living on the West Coast, she founded her own dance troupe, which toured and performed throughout Asia. After returning to America, she performed interpretations of Asian dances for American audiences, including at the Museum of Natural History. Teiko often performed in costumes associated with cultures she represented, including ornate headdresses and kimonos. Some pieces from her collection of clothing are now part of the collection at the Metropolitan Museum of Art. Teiko also taught dance, including to the dancers Michiko Iseri and La Meri.
