= Kazuhiro Ninomiya =

Japanese judoka (1946–2026)

Personal information
- Born: 28 November 1946
- Died: 4 May 2026 (aged 79)
- Occupation: Judoka

Sport
- Country: Japan
- Sport: Judo
- Weight class: ‍–‍93 kg, +93 kg, Open

Achievements and titles
- Olympic Games: (gold) (1976)
- World Champ.: (1973)
- Asian Champ.: (gold) (1972)
Medal record
Men's judo
Representing Japan
Olympic Games
| Gold medal – first place | 1976 Montreal | ‍–‍93 kg |
World Championships
| Gold medal – first place | 1973 Lausanne | Open |
| Silver medal – second place | 1975 Vienna | Open |
Asian Championships
| Gold medal – first place | 1972 Kaohsiung | +93 kg |
Summer Universiade
| Gold medal – first place | 1967 Tokyo | ‍–‍93 kg |

Profile at external databases
- IJF: 54415
- JudoInside.com: 5445
- Updated on 21 June 2023

Kazuhiro Ninomiya (二宮 和弘, Ninomiya Kazuhiro; 28 November 1946 – 4 May 2026) was a Japanese judoka who competed in the 1976 Summer Olympics.

== Biography ==
After graduating from Tenri University, Ninomiya entered the Shoki Juku under the instruction of Isao Okano. He joined the Fukuoka Prefecture police force in April 1972, and placed third in the All-Japan Judo Championships that year. He won a gold medal in the heavyweight division of the Asian Judo Championships in 1970 and the open weight division of the 1973 World Championships held in Lausanne, Switzerland by defeating future Olympic gold medalist Haruki Uemura. He won a silver medal at the 1975 World Championships and won the All-Japan Judo Championships for the first time in 1976 to qualify for the 1976 Summer Olympics. However, the Japanese Olympic team had already decided on Haruki Uemura and Sumio Endo as the representatives for the Openweight and Heavyweight divisions, and Ninomiya was forced to enter the competition as a half heavyweight (‍–‍93 kg), shedding over 7 kg from his usual competitive weight. Regardless, Ninomiya used his long reach and height (at 6 ft. 2 in., he was considerably tall for a half heavyweight) to become the first Japanese judoka to win a gold medal in the half heavyweight division.

Ninomiya retired after competing in the 1978 Jigoro Kano Cup along with Isamu Sonoda. He and Sonoda were rivals and friends for over 30 years, having been born the same year, entered the same police force, competed in the same World Championships and Olympics, and retired at the same time. After serving as an advisor for several local and prefectural level judo committees, he became a judo instructor at the Nishinippon Institute of Technology in 2007.

He joined under Isao Okano's instruction in the Dojo called "Seiki Juku."

Ninomiya died on 4 May 2026, at the age of 79.

== See also ==
- List of judoka
- List of Olympic medalists in judo
