= Remfry =

Remfry is a surname. Notable people with the surname include:

- Charlotte Remfry (1869–1957), Spanish writer
- David Remfry (born 1942), British painter and curator
- Keith Remfry (1947–2015), British judoka
