= Jerry Ito =

American actor and singer (1927-2007)

- Born: Gerald Tamekichi Itō; June 12, 1927; New York City, New York, U.S.
- Died: July 8, 2007 (aged 80); Los Angeles, California, U.S.
- Education: The New School; Actors Studio
- Occupations: Actor, singer
- Spouse: Sakae Itō
- Father: Michio Itō
- Relatives: Teiji Itō (cousin); Teimoc Johnston-Ono (cousin); Koreya Senda (uncle); Kisaku Itō (uncle); Teiko Itō (aunt)

Gerald Tamekichi “Jerry” Itō (Japanese: ジェリー・伊藤; July 12, 1927 – July 8, 2007) was an American actor, singer, and tarento, who spent most of his professional life in Japan. He was part of a showbusiness family, headed by his father Michio Itō.

== Early life and education ==
Itō was born into a showbusiness family in New York City in 1927. He was the son of Japanese dancer and choreographer Michio Itō and American dancer Hazel Wright. His uncles included playwright and actor Koreya Senda and art director Kisaku Itō, and his cousins included composer Teiji Itō and Olympic judoka Teimoc Johnston-Ono. His paternal grandfather and namesake, Tamekichi Itō, was an architect who designed the Ginza Wako department store.

Itō served in the U.S. Navy during the Second World War, where he was attached to the Supreme Commander for the Allied Powers in Japan, was a member of the American Theatre Wing. After his discharge, he studied acting at The New School, and appeared in a stage adaptation of All the King's Men. However, he was recalled to service during the Korean War, this time in the Army, where he worked for Special Services. After his second discharge, he joined the Actors Studio.

== Career ==
After appearing in the Broadway play The Teahouse of the August Moon, Itō moved to Japan in the mid-1950s, where he married his wife Wakana Hanayagi. While taking Japanese-language classes, he worked as an English-language dubber for Toho Studios. He was later signed to Toho's stage division, though he was frequently loaned out to other film studios due to the lack of roles for Anglophone stage actors.

He established himself as a gaijin tarento (foreign talent), frequently cast as foreigner character in Japanese films. Among his most internationally-recognized parts were as Clark Nelson, the principal antagonist of the 1961 kaiju film Mothra by Toho. He played Ernest Mason Satow in several Taiga dramas. He also recorded several albums for Toshiba Records and was a frequent guest on talk shows. He also appeared in the stage musical Once Upon a Mattress, and was a spokesmodel for Shiseido. From 1995 to 1997, Itō was a cast member of the NHK educational program Let's Play English.

== Personal life ==
Itō was married to Wakana Hanayagi (real name: Sakae Itō), a Nihon-buyō dancer who taught at the University of Toronto and Yale University.

=== Later life and death ===
After suffering a stroke in 1997, Itō moved to Los Angeles for treatment at UCLA Medical Center's Speech Pathology Clinic, where he was involved with the Japanese Language Scholarship Foundation. He lived there until his death from pneumonia in July 2007, four days before his 80th birthday.

== Filmography ==
=== Film ===
Year	Title	Role	Notes
1957	Umi no yarodomo	Arab	
1957	Tokyo no Tekisasujin		
1959	Jan Arima no shûgeki	Milland	
1959	The Manster	Superintendent Aida	
1960	Pineapple butai	Sgt. March	
1961	Kanashiki 60 sai		
1961	Mothra	Clark Nelson	
1961	The Last War (Sekai daisenso)	Watkins	
1962	Gekkyū dorobo	Jose Dagon	
1962	Nippon musekinin yaro	Gary	
1963	Interpol Code 8 (Kokusai himitsu keisatsu: shirei dai hachigo)	Rudolf Kent	
1963	Yabunirami Nippon	John Machihei	
1963	The Elegant Life of Mr. Everyman (Eburi manshi no yūga-na seikatsu)	Pete Nicholas	
1963	Ankokugai No. 1	Anpo	
1964	You Can Succeed, Too (Kimi mo shusse ga dekiru)	McGregor	
1968	Shin Abashiri Bangaichi	Jimmy Nakata	
1970	Hakurai jingi: Kapone no shatei	Huber	
1977	Golgo 13: Assignment Kowloon (Golgo 13: Kūron no kubi)	Polanski	
1978	Message from Space (Uchu kara no messeji)	Commander	

=== Television ===
Year	Title	Role	Notes
1958	Watashi wa Kai ni Naritai	Army MP	
1967	Dekkai Seishun	Jerry Takai	1 episode
1967	San shimai	Ernest Mason Satow	
1968	Ryōma ga Yuku	Ernest Mason Satow	
1968	Maboroshijō		
1968	Mighty Jack	Roberto Okamura	1 episode
1968	John Manjirō		
1968	Fuji Santaro		1 episode
1970	Surōnin Hanayama Daikichi	Donickel Willman	
1974	Katsu Kaishū	Ernest Mason Satow	
1977	Nippon no Sengo	Courtney Whitney	
1977	Kashin	Edward Snell	
1978	UFO daisensou: Tatakae! Reddo taigâ	Dr. Amano	
1978	Edogawa Rampo no bijo	Georges Point	1 episode
1979	Daitokai	Sherwin	1 episode
1979	Tokusō Saizensen	George Haraguchi	2 episodes
1980	Tokumei Keiji	Ferdinand Garcia	1 episode
1980	Hijō no raisensu	Charles E. Crawford	1 episode
1981	Black Jack (Kayama Yuzo no Blackjack)	Captain Kenneth	1 episode
1982	Bid for Power	Watanabe	
1983	Ōoku		1 episode
1985	Yomeshūtome Jindori Gassen		
1986	Taiyō ni Hoero!	Thomas Bernardo	1 episode
1995-97	Let's Play English	Grandpa Jerry	
