= Teiji Ito =

Japanese composer and performer (1935–1982)

- 伊藤貞司
- Born: January 22, 1935; Tokyo, Empire of Japan
- Died: August 16, 1982 (aged 47); Port-au-Prince, Haiti
- Occupation: Composer
- Years active: 1952–1982
- Known for: Film and theatrical scores
- Spouse(s): Maya Deren (m. 1960–1961) Gail Ryan; Ilene Itō; Cherel Winett
- Children: Tavia Itō
- Parent(s): Teiko Ito; Yuji Itō
- Relatives: Genji Itō (brother); Teimoc Johnston-Ono (brother); Jerry Ito (cousin)

Japanese name
- Kanji: 伊藤貞司
- Hiragana: いとう ていじ
- Katakana: イトウ テイジ
Transcriptions
- Romanization: Itō Teiji

Teiji Ito (伊藤貞司, Itō Teiji; January 22, 1935 – August 16, 1982) was a Japanese composer, dancer, and performer. He wrote numerous scores for both stage and screen, notably in collaboration with avant-garde filmmaker Maya Deren, whom he was later married to.

== Early life ==
Ito was born in Tokyo, Japan to a theatrical family. His mother, Teiko Ito (née Ono), was an American-born dancer and his father, Yuji Ito, was a designer and composer. His younger brother Teimoc Johnston-Ono is an Olympic judoka. His family moved to the United States in 1941 when he was six. His uncles were choreographer Michio Itō and theatre director Koreya Senda, and actor Jerry Ito was his first cousin.

Ito accompanied his mother's dance performance at the American Museum of Natural History in New York City; he performed for both Japanese and Korean dance. At 15, he ran away from home.

== Career ==
Ito began to compose at age 17. He met Maya Deren during this time and in 1955, traveled with her to Haiti. There, Ito studied under a master drummer. Ito would also compose the score for Deren's Meshes of the Afternoon at Deren's request. Ito married Deren in 1960 and remained married to her until her death on October 13, 1961.

Ito won an Obie Award for his scores during the 1960-1961 off-Broadway season; the productions included Brecht's In the Jungle of Cities, King Ubu, and Three Modern Japanese Plays. In 1963, he composed the score for the Broadway production of One Flew Over the Cuckoo's Nest. Ito wrote Watermill which was first performed by the New York City Ballet in 1971. Ito also performed and composed for Jean Erdman's Theater of the Open Eye.

Ito and his fourth wife, Cherel, edited Deren's 1947–1951 footage she shot while in Haiti; this would result in the documentary Divine Horsemen: The Living Gods of Haiti.

== Death ==
While in Haiti, Ito died of a heart attack in 1982.

== Discography ==
- Meshes: Music For Films and Theater (O.O. Discs)
- Music For Maya: Early Film Music Of Teiji Ito (Tzadik Records, 2-CD set)
- King Ubu (Tzadik)
- The Shamanic Principles (Tzadik)
- Tenno (Tzadik)
- Watermill (Tzadik)
