= Pedro Santos =

Pedro Santos may refer to:

== Politicians ==
- Pedro Abad Santos (1876–1945), Filipino politician
- Pedro Nuno Santos (born 1977), Portuguese politician
- Pedro Santos (politician), Peruvian politician

== Sportspeople ==
=== Association football ===
- Pedro Santos (footballer, born 1976), Pedro Jorge Santos dos Santos, Portuguese former football midfielder
- Pedro Santos (footballer, born 1983), Pedro Miguel Fonte Boa Santos, Portuguese former football centre-back
- Pedro Santos (footballer, born 1988), Pedro Miguel Martins Santos, Portuguese football wing-back
- Pedro Santos (footballer, born 1996), Pedro Rafael Barbosa Santos, Portuguese football centre-back
- Pedro Santos (footballer, born 2000), Pedro Carvalho Santos, Portuguese football midfielder
- Pedro Santos (footballer, born 2003), Pedro Miguel Costa Santos, Portuguese football midfielder

=== Judo ===
- Pedro Santos (judoka) (born 1955), Puerto Rican judoka

== Other ==
- Pedro Paulo Santos (born 1935), archbishop of the Roman Catholic Archdiocese of Caceres
