= Koreya Senda =

Japanese actor (1904–1994)

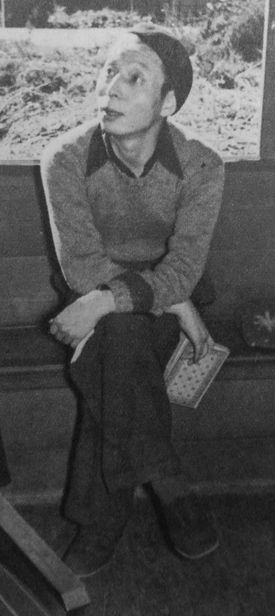
- Born: Kunio Itō; 15 September 1904; Kanagawa Prefecture, Japan
- Died: 21 December 1994 (aged 90)
- Education: Waseda University
- Occupations: Theatre director, playwright, actor, translator
- Years active: 1936–1970
- Relatives: Michio Itō (brother); Jerry Ito (nephew); Teiji Ito (nephew); Teimoc Johnston-Ono (nephew)

Japanese name
- Kanji: 千田是也
- Hiragana: せんだ これや
- Katakana: センダ コレヤ
Transcriptions
- Romanization: Senda Koreya

Alternative Japanese name
- Kanji: 伊藤圀夫
- Hiragana: いとう くにお
- Katakana: イトウ クニオ
Transcriptions
- Romanization: Itō Kunio

Kunio Itō (Japanese: 伊藤圀夫, Hepburn: Itō Kunio; 15 September 1904 – 21 December 1994), known by the stage name Koreya Senda (千田是也, Senda Koreya), was a Japanese theatre director, playwright, translator, and actor. He is known for founding the Haiyuza Theatre Company, and translating and directing the works of Bertolt Brecht in post-World War II Japan. He appeared in more than 50 films between 1936 and 1970.

== Biography ==
He was born in Kanagawa Prefecture, Japan, in 1904 to Kamiye Iijima, and his father Tamekicki Ito, an architect, under the name Kunio Itō (伊藤圀夫). His older brother was the dancer and choreographer Michio Itō.

Senda adopted his stage name due to an incident that followed the 1923 Great Kantō earthquake. Japanese vigilantes roamed the streets, and accused, beat, and killed people they suspected of being Korean in what became the Kantō Massacre. Senda wrote in 1988:

It turned out that I was mistaken for Korean, and they wouldn’t believe me even though I denied it over and over saying, "I am Japanese…I am a student at Waseda University," with my student ID at hand. They asked me to say "a i u e o" and recite the names of the emperors in Japanese history….Fortunately, there was a person who recognized me…. Afterward, my friends suggested that I take “Senda Koreya” (that is, "a Korean in Sendagaya") as my pen name.

Senda was a leader in the modern theater movement in Japan, helping found the Haiyuza Theatre Company, and performing works that "bridged the gap from age-old traditional theater to politically oriented avant-garde and modern works".

=== Berlin ===
In 1927, Senda lived in Berlin, where he was involved with underground theatre performances with the community of Japanese artists living in Germany who was actively engaged with political activism.

To supplement his income, in 1930 Senda founded the design studio Tomoe in Berlin, with the painter Osuke Shimazaki, lacquer artist Kotaro Fukuoka, photographer Hiroshi Yoshizawa, and Bauhaus students Iwao Yamawaki and Michiko Yamawaki, a photographer and architect, and a textile artist, respectively. The studio produced posters, gift-wrap paper and leaflets, and undertook window dressing and interior design for Japanese restaurants.

Senda and his wife, Irma, returned to Japan in January 1931 via Moscow, on the Trans-Siberian Railway.

== Selected filmography ==
- Eine Nacht in Yoshiwara (1928)
- Hantô no maihime (1936) - Tomei's friend
- Sakura no sono (1936) - Tomoo Serizawa
- Kûsô buraku (1939) - Daisuke Yokokawa
- Hideko no ôendanchô (1940) - Jiro Takashima, Ichiro's brother
- The Love of the Actress Sumako (1947)
- Waga koi wa moenu (1949) - Prime Minister Inagki
- Shin'ya no kokuhaku (1949)
- Mahiru no embukyoku (1949) - Yoshiki Sakazaki
- Zen-ma (1951) - Tsuyoshi Kitaura
- Koibito (1951)
- Himitsu (1952) - Sakutaro Maki
- Magokoro (1953) - Yûzô Ariga
- Jûdai no seiten (1953) - Shûhei, Kaoru's father
- Aoiro kakumei (1953) - Tatsukichi Koizumi
- Hiroba no kodoku (1953)
- Taiheiyô no washi (1953)
- Waseda daigaku (1953) - Haruo Kageyama
- Gate of Hell (1953) - Gen Kiyomori
- Shishun no izumi (1953) - Priest
- Life of a Woman (1953) - Fujiko's father
- Shinsengumi Oni Taicho (1954)
- Kunsho (1954)
- Nyonin no yakata (1954)
- Verrat an Deutschland (1955) - Konoye
- Tsuki ni tobu kari (1955) - Masayoshi, Kimiko's father
- Seishun kaidan (1955) - Takaya Okumura
- The Phantom Horse (1955) - Hamamura
- Shin Heike Monogatari (1955) - Sadaijin Fujiwara no Yorinaga
- Yûhi to kenjû (1956)
- Mori wa ikiteiru (1956) - Prime minister
- Tsukigata Hanpeita: Hana no maki; Arashi no maki (1956) - Kintomo Anegakôji
- An Actress (1956) - Yasuda
- Joyu (1956) - Yasuda
- Yûwaku (1957) - Shôkichi Sugimoto
- Hadairo no tsuki (1957) - Kôhei Ôike
- Bitoku no yoromeki (1957) - Fuji
- A Slope in the Sun (1958) - Tamakichi, Shinji's father
- Yoru no hamon (1958) - Shûsem Ashida
- Yoku (1958) - Kurokawa
- The H-Man (1958) - Dr. Maki
- Varan the Unbelievable (1958) - Dr. Sugimoto
- Riko na oyome-san (1958)
- Wakai kawa no nagare (1959) - Daizô Kawasaki
- Lucky Dragon No. 5 (1959) - Dr. Kinoshita
- Battle in Outer Space (1959) - Professor Adachi
- Shinran (1960) - Tsukiwa
- Aoi yaju (1960) - Ayako's Father
- Zoku shinran (1960)
- Matsukawa-Jiken (1961)
- Shin Genji monogatari (1961)
- Buda (1961) - Shuddhodana
- Arabu no arashi (1961)
- Onnakeizu (1962) - Sunzo Sakai
- Varan the Unbelievable (1962) - Observer
- Shiro to kuro (1963) - Munakata
- Miyamoto Musashi: Ichijôji no kettô (1964)
- Miyamoto Musashi: Ganryû-jima no kettô (1965) - Hon'ami Koetsu
- Kemonomichi (1965)
- Tora! Tora! Tora! (1970) - Prince Fumimaro Konoe
