= Žuvela =

Žuvela is a Croatian surname.

It is the second most common surname in the Dubrovnik-Neretva County of Croatia.

People with the name include:

- Chris Zuvela (born 1997), Australian footballer of Croatian descent
- Domenica Žuvela (born 1992), Croatian singer
- Goran Žuvela (born 1948), Croatian judoka
