= List of programs broadcast by TV Japan =

This is a list of current and former television programs broadcast by TV Japan in North America.

The network broadcasts a variety of Japanese programs, ranging from anime to drama.

== Current programming ==
=== News ===
- NHK News 7
- News Check 11
- News in Depth
- News Watch 9
- National capsule forecasts in Japanese from AccuWeather
- Weekend Japanology

=== Drama ===
- 99.9
- A Fading Summer
- Aibō: Tokyo Detective Duo (Partners)
- Contrail: Crime and Love
- Good Partner
- It's not that I can't marry. I don't marry
- Jūhan Shuttai!
- Kamen Rider Ghost
- The Last Restaurant
- The Most Difficult Romance
- Nezumi-Kozo Running Around Edo 2
- Sanadamaru
- Toto Nee-chan: Fatherly Sister
- Totto Television
- Whispers from a Crime Scene

=== Music ===
- AKB48 Show!
- Banana Zero Music
- The Covers
- J-Melo
- Music Station
- Okaasan to Issho
- NHK Nodo Jiman
- Shounen Club (Pop Music Club)
- School of Songs!
- Song Concert
- Songs of Japanese Spirit

=== Anime ===
- Anpanman
- Case Closed
- Chibi Maruko-chan
- One Piece
- Tsukumogami Kashimasu
- Waka Okami wa Shōgakusei!
- Ninja Hattori-kun Returns

=== Kids ===
- Kamen Rider Drive
- Chatty Jay's Sundry Shop
- Design Ah!
- Fun with English
- Fun with Japanese
- Home Cooking DJ
- Kid’s Discovery
- Wan Wan Wonderland

== Former programming ==
=== Anime ===
- Aikatsu!
- Aikatsu Stars!
- Aikatsu Friends!
- Aikatsu on Parade!
- Anne of Green Gables (anime)
- Anohana: The Flower We Saw That Day
- Chihayafuru
- DokiDoki! PreCure
- Doraemon (2012-2014)
- Dragon Ball
- Dragon Ball GT
- Dragon Ball Super
- Dragon Ball Z
- Fresh Pretty Cure!
- Futari wa Pretty Cure
- Futari wa Pretty Cure Max Heart
- Futari wa Pretty Cure Splash Star
- Go! Princess PreCure
- HappinessCharge PreCure!
- HeartCatch PreCure!
- Hug! Pretty Cure
- Kuroko's Basketball
- Kirakira Pretty Cure a la Mode
- Kiratto Pri Chan
- Idol Time PriPara
- March Comes in Like a Lion
- Naruto
- Naruto Shippuden
- Pokémon
- PriPara
- Rin-ne
- The Rose of Versailles
- Sailor Moon
- Sushi and Beyond
- Smile PreCure!
- Star Twinkle PreCure
- Suite PreCure
- Waccha PriMagi!
- We All Love Sorajiro!
- Witchy PreCure!
- Yes! PreCure 5
- Yes! PreCure 5 GoGo!
- Yowamushi Pedal
- Yu-Gi-Oh!

=== Cartoons ===
- Dexter's Laboratory
- Ed, Edd n Eddy
- Courage the Cowardly Dog
- The Fairly OddParents
- The Grim Adventures of Billy & Mandy
- The Loud House
- The Powerpuff Girls
- SpongeBob SquarePants
- Tom and Jerry
- Winx Club

=== Kids ===
- Kamen Rider Fourze
- Kamen Rider Wizard
