= Gísli Þorsteinsson =

Icelandic judoka (born 1952)

Personal information
- Nationality: Icelandic
- Born: 3 August 1952 (age 72)

Sport
- Sport: Judo

Gísli Þorsteinsson (born 3 August 1952) is an Icelandic judoka. He competed in the men's half-heavyweight event at the 1976 Summer Olympics.
