= Assane N'Doye =

Senegalese judoka

Personal information
- Nationality: Senegalese
- Born: 25 January 1953 (age 72)

Sport
- Sport: Judo

Assane N'Doye (born 25 January 1953) is a Senegalese judoka. He competed in the men's middleweight event at the 1976 Summer Olympics.
