= Jorge Comrie =

Panamanian judoka

Personal information
- Nationality: Panamanian
- Born: 7 July 1951 (age 73)

Sport
- Sport: Judo

Jorge Comrie (born 7 July 1951) is a Panamanian judoka. He competed in the men's half-heavyweight event at the 1976 Summer Olympics.
