= Daniel Guldemont =

Belgian judoka

Personal information
- Nationality: Belgian
- Born: 27 October 1953 (age 71); Montignies-sur-Sambre, Belgium

Sport
- Sport: Judo

Daniel Guldemont (born 27 October 1953) is a Belgian judoka. He competed in the men's middleweight event at the 1976 Summer Olympics.
