= Iwao Yamawaki =

Japanese photographer and architect (1898–1987)

- Born: Iwao Fujita; 29 April 1898; Japan
- Died: 8 March 1987 (aged 88); Japan
- Occupations: Photographer, architect

Signature
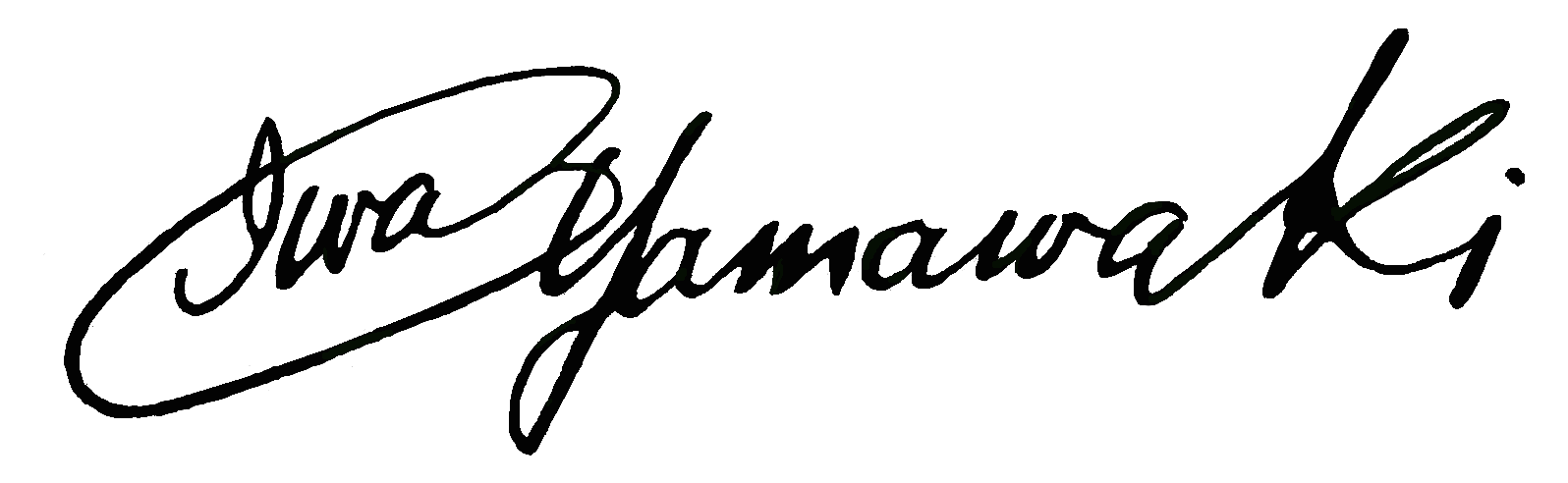
- Signatue Iwao Yamawaki

Iwao Yamawaki (山脇 巌, Yamawaki Iwao; 29 April 1898 – 8 March 1987), born Iwao Fujita, was a Japanese photographer and architect who trained at the Bauhaus.

== Early life and education ==
Born in Nagasaki, Yamawaki studied architecture at the Tokyo School of Fine Arts (now the Tokyo University of the Arts) from 1921 to 1926.

After his graduation he worked as an architect for the Yokogawa Construction Company and began to take photographs, which he submitted to the publications and competitions of Kenchiku gakkai (the Society for Architectural Research).

He was active in theatre circles as a costume and set designer and in 1926 he founded the Ningyō-za theatre in Tokyo with Koreya Senda (1904–1994) and others, and became involved with Tan'i sanka, an avant-garde artists' group, where he met the Bauhaus student Sadanosuke Nakada (1888–1970), and where he later became friends with Takehiko Mizutani (1898–1969), the first Japanese student to study at the Bauhaus.

He was formally introduced to Michiko Yamawaki (1910–2000), an heiress and the eldest daughter of a wealthy businessman, whom he married in 1928. He was asked by her father to adopt her family name, which he did in return for is new family-in-law financing the opportunity for both of them to study at the Bauhaus.

In May 1930 Iwao and Michiko left Japan for New York, where they spent two months, before travelling to Berlin, where they were reunited with Koreya Senda, who had already been living in Berlin for about two years. Senda, a politically active socialist, was involved with underground theatre in Berlin, and with the Japanese artistic community in the city, which he introduced the Yamawaki's to. They often gathered in decadent bars, such as the El Dorado, a famous gay, lesbian and trans venue.

In 1930 Yamawakis, together with Senda, the painter Osuke Shimazaki, lacquer artist Kotaro Fukuoka and photographer Hiroshi Yoshizawa, founded the design studio Tomoe in Berlin. The studio produced posters, gift-wrap paper and leaflets, and undertook window dressing and interior design for Japanese restaurants.

In October 1930 the couple began Josef Albers' first semester preliminary course at the Bauhaus in Dessau. In April 1931 Michiko went on to study in the weaving workshop and Iwao initially studied architecture, but a few months later he changed to the photography course taught by Walter Peterhans. Iwao developed a close friendship with fellow student and later Bauhaus teacher Kurt Kranz. Kranz was interested in photomontage and introduced Yamawaki to it.

Iwao Yamawaki had a strong interest in architectural photography and took many photographs of the exterior and interior of the famous Bauhaus Dessau building complex, as well as of buildings in Berlin, Amsterdam and Moscow. His photographs are strongly influenced by the Neues Sehen (New Vision), an avantgarde movement of the 1920s and 1930s espoused by Bauhaus teacher László Moholy-Nagy, which encouraged photography of ordinary scenes using unfamiliar perspectives and angles, close-up details, use of light and shadow, and experimentation with multiple exposure.

Senda and his wife, Irma, returned to Japan in January 1931 on the Trans-Siberian Railway.They stayed for a time in Moscow on their way back, and Yamawakis and several others in the Berlin Japanese artistic community joined them for a week, visiting the theatre and seeing the sights.

The couple remained in Germany until the Bauhaus Dessau closed at the end of August 1932, when they returned to Japan.

== Back in Japan ==
On his return to Tokyo, Yamawaki taught photography for 6 months at the Shinkenchiku kōgei (New Architecture and Design College), which was known as the 'Japanese Bauhaus'. He exhibited some of his work, but was dissatisfied with the Japanese photographic scene and gave up photography altogether.

He became a successful architect and designed houses for the wealthy, developing a hybrid Japanese and Western design style, with architects such as Mies van der Rohe and Le Corbusier as his influences. Yamawaki also worked as an architectural journalist and was widely published. He designed a modernist villa for himself and his wife in 1934 and they furnished it with pieces that they imported from Germany, such as the Wassily Chair.

He established his own architectural office in 1939 and designed the interiors of the Japanese pavilion in the Government Zone at the 1939–1940 New York World's Fair.

The Yamawakis had two children in the late 1930s – early 1940s. Although they had mixed in a socialist milieu in Germany, during World War II they collaborated with the ruling Japanese fascist regime.

In 1953 Yamawaki designed the Haiyūza theatre for his old friend Koreya Senda, and in 1954 and 1971 Iwao and Michiko Yamawaki brought Bauhaus exhibitions to Japan. However, in the post-war years they both largely fell into obscurity.

== Bibliography ==
- Čapková, Helena, (2014)Transnational Networkers—Iwao and Michiko Yamawaki and the Formation of Japanese Modernist Design in Journal of Design History vol.27, no.4
- Sischy, Ingrid (ed); Yamawaki, Iwao (1999), Iwao Yamawaki. Göttingen: Edition 7L, Steidl. (Photobook with introduction and biography in English, French and German)
- Yamawaki, Iwao, Reminiscences of Dessau in Design Issues, vol.2, no.2, Autumn 1985, pp. 56–68.
- Yamawaki, Michiko, (1995) Bauhausu to chanoyu (Bauhaus and Tea Ceremony) (in Japanese), Tokyo: Shinchōsha

== Podcast ==
- Interview with Yamawaki researchers Helena Čapková and Mariko Takagi about Michiko & Iwao Yamawaki on bauhaus faces podcast, host: Dr. Anja Guttenberger, published on 14 Feb, 2025
