= Jurek Jatowitt =

Austrian judoka

Personal information
- Nationality: Austrian
- Born: 21 February 1952 (age 73); Sopot, Poland
- Occupation: Judoka

Sport
- Sport: Judo

Jurek Jatowitt (born 21 February 1952) is an Austrian judoka. He competed in the men's middleweight event at the 1976 Summer Olympics.
