= Michiko Yamawaki =

Japanese designer and textile artist who trained at the Bauhaus

- Born: July 13, 1910; Tsukiji, Chūō, Japan
- Died: 2000 (aged 89–90); Tokyo, Japan
- Occupations: Textile artist, designer

Signature
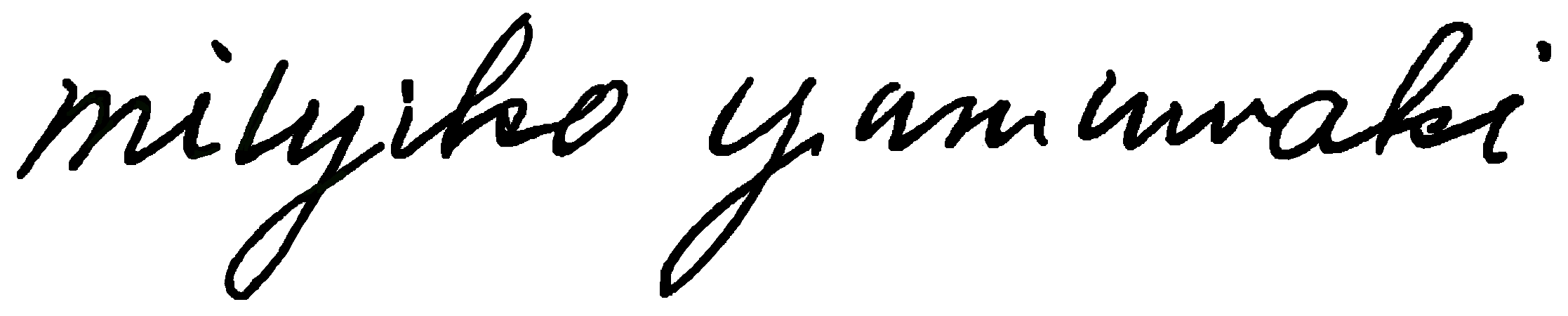
- Signature Michiko Yamawaki (1910–2000)

Michiko Yamawaki ( 山脇 道子 Yamawaki Michiko, 1910 – 2000), was a Japanese designer and textile artist who trained at the Bauhaus. She was one of four Japanese students to study at the Bauhaus in Dessau, studying drawing, weaving, and typography.

She was born in the 43rd year of the Meiji (era) in Tsukiji, a district of Chūō, Tokyo, as the oldest daughter of Zengoro Yamawaki, a Urasenke tea ceremony master. She married photographer and architect Iwao Yamawaki in Japan in 1928; as she was a heiress and the eldest daughter of an important family, he was asked to adopt her family name, which he did - in exchange, the family financially supported both of their studies at the Bauhaus. In May 1930, Michiko and Iwao left Japan for California and then New York, where they spent two months, before travelling to Berlin, where they were reunited with Koreya Senda, who had already been living in Berlin for about two years. Senda, a politically active socialist, was involved with underground theatre in Berlin, and with the Japanese artistic community in the city, which he introduced the Yamawakis to.

At the Bauhaus she studied in the early 1930s under teachers including Wassily Kandinsky, Anni Albers, Josef Albers, and Gunta Stölzl. After her time in Germany came to a close after the Nazis closed the school in Dessau, she and her husband returned to Japan in 1932. Upon their return to Tokyo their transnational experience and education became trademark in their work, as well as their lifestyle. They were influential in promoting the Bauhaus teaching model and aesthetics in Japan. Among her creative pursuits in Tokyo, she taught at the Shinkenchiku kōgei gakuin (School of New Architecture and Design) in Tokyo as head of the weaving course, helping to bring the Bauhaus pedagogical and aesthetic approach to Japan. After the Second World War, Michiko taught at the Nihon University.

== Early life ==
Michiko was the eldest daughter of Zengorō Yamawaki, a businessman from an Osaka sake brewing family, who was a major owner of land in the Tsukiji area of Tokyo. Zengorō devoted his time to tea ceremony, which he practiced in the style of the Urasenke School. He himself produced some of the vessels used for the ceremony. The life of he and his family resultingly centered on the tea ceremony aesthetics of seasonal change, truth to materials, and simplicity. Michiko’s childhood also then centered on tea culture, and her father's collection of old art objects. Scholars of Michiko's life and career note that a penchant for modern and fashionable things in her childhood may have given her a special sensitivity towards the Japanese quality she later encountered at the Bauhaus. Although Michiko claimed in her book Bauhausu to Chanoyu (Bauhaus and Tea Ceremony) that she had no interest in design prior to meeting Iwao, her life and sense of taste were formed by her family’s refined home and her father’s tea ceremony practice, which later resonated with her experience of the Bauhaus and the modern art she encountered in Germany. In particular, she later felt an affinity with the Bauhaus ideas of simplicity, functionality, and a deep interest in materials, their quality and use.

Young Michiko became the heiress to a portion of the family wealth when her uncle died prematurely. When Iwao Fujita met Michiko through omiai, or formal introduction, and married the beautiful, young, and extremely wealthy Michiko in 1928, he was asked to enter the family and adopt its name, which he accepted, in return for an opportunity to study at the Bauhaus. Michiko's father, who spoke German and was aware of cutting-edge artistic production in Germany, supported the idea and used his finances to turn the Yamawakis' study trip into a fuller professional experience. Access to education indicates the Yamazaki family's pedigree in a culturally elitist world: for women, the opportunity to study visual art was restricted compared with men, and studying abroad even more so restricted by social class.

In May 1930, the couple left Yokohama to travel to Europe via the US. They spent two months in New York City, where Michiko bought new clothes and had her hair cut in order to arrive at the Bauhaus as a modern girl. Soon upon arrival in Berlin they contacted Iwao's friend from Tokyo's theatrical circles, leftist avant-garde artist and theatre director Koreya Senda, who had been living in Berlin for a few years. He helped them to find an apartment in Dessau, about a four hours' drive from Berlin. Senda was actively engaged in underground performances in Berlin, and with the community of Japanese residing in Germany who were engaged in political activism. Senda, together with the painter Osuke Shimazaki, lacquer artist Kotaro Fukuoka, photographer Hiroshi Yoshizawa and the Yamawakis founded a design studio, Tomoe, to support their modest living in Berlin. The studio produced leaflets, posters, wrapping paper, window and interior decoration for Japanese restaurants in Berlin, which were growing in number, together with an expanding Japanese community. Senda returned to Japan via Moscow in January 1931 and the group joined him for a week. The Yamawakis went together with Senda's wife Irma, theatre director and theorist Seki Sano, who later went to Mexico and became a key figure in Mexican modern theatre, Michiko's cousin, and the Asahi newspaper journalist, graphic designer, and woodblock artist Masahide Asahi. In Moscow they saw several performances in the Theatre of Revolution (now the Mayakovsky Theatre) and the Central Theatre of Working Youth. Back in Berlin, they continued living a socially rich lifestyle with the Japanese avant-garde crowd, as well as studying in Dessau.

== Bauhaus ==
In November 1922 Japanese art critic Sadanosuke Nakada and architect Kikuji Ishimoto visited the Bauhaus in Weimar, to meet with Wassily Kandinsky, who had invited them there. On their return to Japan, Ishimoto and Nakada wrote about the school, expressing their enthusiasm for the workshops, products, and artists through their art magazine Mizue in 1925. In particular, Nakada had written an article entitled "the State Bauhaus," which was particularly influential. Then, the architect Takehiko Mizutani became the first student from Japan to visit the Bauhaus in 1927. Specifically, Mizutani had received an architecture scholarship from the Japanese Ministry of Culture to study at a forward-thinking university in Germany, and later apply this knowledge in his teaching in Japan. After arriving in Berlin in the summer of 1926, Mizutani first visited the Reimann School, a private art and design college. Later that year he visited the Bauhaus for the first time, and transferred to Dessau for the 1927 summer semester. At the end of 1929, Mizutani left the Bauhaus and returned to Japan, where he shared ideas from the Bauhaus in publications and by participating in exhibitions.

Following these first encounters, in 1930, Michiko passed the Bauhaus entrance exam, and the two began studying together as the 470th and 169th students respectively, remaining for two years. At the time of Michiko's study, out of 170 students, fifty were women. She began her studies with Vorkurs, or preliminary courses, which included modules on materials, abstract composition and design, as well as mathematics, physics, and gymnastics. At the Bauhaus, Michiko engaged in studies under Albers, Kandinsky, and Joost Schmidt. Michiko recalls in her writing Josef Albers being particularly kind and that his lectures in the preparatory course were the most interesting. She also recounts that “[Josef] Albers looked and dressed like someone who performed the Japanese tea ceremony." Lectures were taught in German, which proved difficult for Michiko whose German was basic at the time. She gratefully notes that Wassily Kandinsky was kind enough to give them special time after lessons and explained difficult or important parts of his lectures in English. The Yamawakis engaged in many of the Bauhaus’ extracurricular activities, such as its festivals. The February 1931 edition was an “Oriental Night” for which Michiko “learned a traditional Japanese dance… which she performed, dressed in a kimono" while Iwao built the stage set. The performance had a great impact on students and faculty alike, especially Josef Albers. It is from this night that the couple was introduced by Kandinsky to Paul Klee.

After completing preliminary courses, Michiko began studying in the weaving workshop under Gunta Stölzl and Anni Albers, while Iwao studied photography. At Bauhaus, Michiko discovered parallels between traditional Japanese tea culture, and the Bauhaus philosophy of aesthetics and craft. In particular, Michiko found that the material properties, simplicity, and function of objects were treated as equally important in both realms. She described her studies a re-entered the world of tea that she knew intimately from her childhood.

== Professional life ==
When the political pressure on the Bauhaus intensified in 1932 and the move to Berlin was imminent, the Yamawakis returned to Japan, not wanting to continue their studies at the privately-run Bauhaus which was opening on 18 October of the same year. They took with them not only their numerous pieces of work, furniture and books, but also two looms, which Michiko subsequently used in her Tokyo studio in her work as a successful textile and fashion designer. During their time in Germany, the Yamawakis had curated a collection of objects, which they made available to other researchers and exhibitors in Japan. This large number of designed objects was intended to reconstruct the Bauhaus atmosphere and teaching methodology in Japan. Following their return from Dessau in 1933, Iwao established his own architectural firm, the Iwao Yamawaki Architecture Association, in Tokyo, which was in operation until 1971. Projects he worked on included the planning and the construction of the Japanese pavilion at the 1939 New York World's Fair and the planning and the design of the 1950 Gropius and the Bauhaus exhibition in Tokyo, which was the first such large-scale exhibition in Japan. Michiko designed the textile section of this exhibit, as well as the design for the "Bauhaus Textile Exhibition" held in Tokyo in 1933.

In Tokyo, the Yamawakis joined circles promoting a modern and Euro-American lifestyle, and lectured widely in both formal and informal settings, such as, in the latter case, Sadanoksuke Nakada's apartment. Michiko's father Zengorō rented a modern apartment for the young couple in the Tokuda Building in Ginza, which had just been completed to a design by Kameki Tsuchiura. The Yamawakis rented the third floor and half of the fifth floor, where the two looms were placed, which Michiko used as her workshop. The fifth floor apartment became the location for a large number of designed objects made by designers at the Bauhaus, books, and even simple furniture from the school canteen. The apartment became a meeting place for architects.

Michiko and Iwao were considered some of the main promoters, even emulators, of the Bauhaus in Japan. After returning home at the end of 1932, the married couple embodied the popular modern Western fashion and lifestyle known as "moga" and "mobo" (modern girl and modern boy), entering moboga circles. As Michiko and Iwao began teaching in Japan, their creative practices leveraged their elite status of iconic moboga and attempted to connect and fuse Japanese tradition with the avant-garde they experienced in Berlin. Michiko published her memories of the Bauhaus in the book Bauhaus to chanoyu (Bauhaus and Tea Ceremony), edited by Naomichi Kawahata, in which she gave a detailed insight into the Bauhaus, as well as the world of moboga in Tokyo in the 1930s.

In May 1933 the wife of Sadanosuke Nakada, the yōga (western style) painter Yoshie Nakada, curated Michiko Yamawaki's solo show Yamawaki Michiko Bauhausu teorimono koten at the Shiseido Gallery, which primarily showcased Michiko's textile work. Michiko added to the display some products and jewellery from the Bauhaus metal workshop. Interest in the Bauhaus was at a peak and many artists came to the see the exhibition. Michiko wrote in her book that although most of the time, as an iconic moga, she wore a European style outfit, she chose to wear a kimono with a wisteria design for the exhibition opening. The kimono, to her, was connected to the Bauhaus and she remembered how naturally she was treated while wearing it in the campus in Dessau. This transcultural aesthetic, both traditional and modern, became the Yamawaki trademark. They had a Japanese room in their Bauhaus-style villa in Komaba, Tokyo, and were enthusiastic about Japanese ceramics and Mingei craft. They asaw an affinity between the modern ways developed by the Bauhaus and traditional Japanese arts, and, through art, developed a lifestyle that merged the two styles of looking and living.

In 1934, Japanese architect Renshichirō Kawakita invited both Yamawakis to teach in his school, the Shinkenchiku kōgei gakuin, the "Japanese Bauhaus" with the school's addition of new courses. Michiko became the head of the weaving course and her colleague Shizuko Kageyama became head of western fashion design. Both courses, in the newly formed Centre for Weaving and Fashion Design, were advertised in the contemporary women's magazine Fujin gahō. Michiko taught a three-hour class once a week and the course lasted three and a half months. For this purpose Michiko designed a small loom, which became known as the Michiko teoriki (Michiko's loom).

The looms were produced in about fifty pieces in the Gunma Takasaki workshop, the same workshop which employed the German architect Bruno Taut, who was introduced to the Yamawakis. From 1934 Michiko again used the portable loom when she started teaching textile design at the Jiyu gakūen school, run by progressive women's educator and publisher Hani Motoko. A year later her work The Loom and the Cat was exhibited in the craft section of the Teiten salon exhibition. The textile piece was very large, 150 x 300 cm, and she noted that she received help with the work from Bruno Taut's beloved student Tokugen Mihara, and one more assistant. By this time Michiko was a fully established artist and widely respected authority on modern textiles who published widely, and who as in various capacities a member of several artists' associations. From 1939 she acted as a Research Associate at the Nihon shukōgeibunka kyōkai (Japanese Handicrafts Association).

== The Yamawaki Residence ==
Images of the Yamawaki's Tokyo home show a modernist villa that is an interpretation of a Central European modernist house. The large living room was furnished with pieces Michiko and Iwao imported from Germany, including the famous Wassily steel tube chairs. In the German-style apartment was a Japanese-style room with a veranda. As well as in the architecture of their house, Michiko expressed their focus on a fusion of cultures through household items like cutlery.

== Post-war career ==
Since the late 1930s, Michiko had been involved in the forming of a nationalistic image of Japanese women. Michiko's transformation from traditional Japanese girl to modern woman was not a straightforward process. Beneath the glamorous modern image of the couple, Iwao remained, Michiko thought, a very traditional Japanese husband. Shortly after their second child was born Michiko quite suddenly stopped weaving, a fact that was even reported in the press. She did not disappear entirely from the public eye, but focused on the family lifestyle both from a modern, and a woman's, perspective. She promoted the beauty or aesthetics of and in daily life, which she called Seikatsu bigaku ("Aesthetics of Life"). After the war, Iwao re-established his partnership with Senda Koreya and in 1953 designed the well-known Haiyüza Theatre in Roppongi. Michiko noted that at the opening celebration she was mistaken for Chieko Higashiyama, an actress famous from the films of Yasujirõ Ozu. The Yamawakis brought two touring Bauhaus exhibitions to Japan, Gropius and Bauhaus in 1954, and 50 Years of the Bauhaus in 1971. Ise and Walter Gropius came to Japan on the occasion of their exhibition and preferred it to the versions that had toured in Europe and America. Michiko wrote that the Gropiuses had a lovely time with them in Komaba, sitting in the Wassily chairs in their living room. Walter Gropius noticed some details that were executed in the Bauhaus style, but with a Japanese touch, perhaps in a manner similar to how Michiko felt Japanese-ness in the atmosphere at the Bauhaus while she was a student.

== Podcast ==
- Interview with Yamawaki researchers Helena Čapková and Mariko Takagi about Michiko & Iwao Yamawaki on bauhaus faces podcast, host: Dr. Anja Guttenberger, published on 14 Feb, 2025
