= Fahed Salem =

Kuwaiti judoka

Personal information
- Nationality: Kuwaiti
- Born: 10 September 1953 (age 72)

Sport
- Sport: Judo

Fahed Salem (born 10 September 1953) is a Kuwaiti judoka. He competed in the men's half-heavyweight event at the 1976 Summer Olympics.

Salem was in 1976 among the first Judoka that represented Kuwait at the Olympics.
