= An Ung-nam =

North Korean judoka

Personal information
- Native name: 안응남
- Nationality: North Korean
- Born: 7 April 1948 (age 76)

Sport
- Sport: Judo

An Ung-nam (born 7 April 1948) is a North Korean judoka. He competed in the men's half-heavyweight event at the 1976 Summer Olympics.
