= Nyota Inyoka =

French-Indian dancer and choreographer (1896–1971)

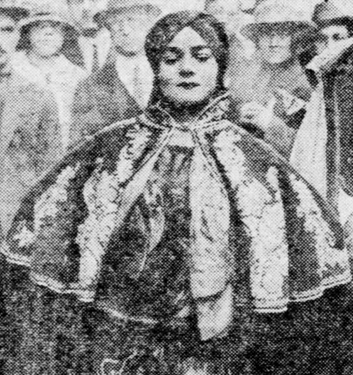
- Nyota Inyoka, from a 1922 publication.
- Born: 1896; Pondicherry
- Died: 1971 (aged 74–75); Paris

Nyota Inyoka (1896 – July 1971), sometimes billed as Princess Nyota Inyoka, was a French-Indian dancer and choreographer.

== Early life ==
Nyota Inyoka was born in Pondicherry and raised in Paris, the daughter of a French mother and an Indian father, though she was sometimes billed as being "Egyptian", "Persian", or "Cambodian". Both of her parents were teachers.

== Career ==
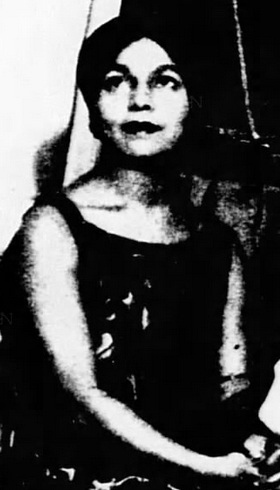
Nyota Inyoka, from a 1922 publication.

Nyota Inyoka's dances and costumes appealed to a wider Western fascinations with the exotic, ancient, and "oriental", in the 1920s and beyond. She frequently researched her dances in the collections of the Musée Guimet. She danced at the Folies Bergère in 1917, in New York in 1920, and again in Paris in 1921, wearing costumes by designer Paul Poiret. She performed in the United States from 1922 to 1924, where she appeared in vaudeville and gave recitals with Japanese dancer Michio Itō. "Little Mme. Nyota Inyoka conjured up historic pictures, with childlike native grace and baby smile, strangely consorted with rapt moods of the East," commented a reviewer in The New York Times, continuing in a similar vein to describe her "cherubic but elastic torso, whirlwind arms and gyrating legs". While in New York, she danced in a program with Anna Pavlova at a costume party hosted by artist Malvina Hoffman in 1924. Sensational reports in the American press described her as haunted, cursed, mysterious; some even posited "death threats" that awaited her in India because of her revealing costumes, presumably to heighten interest in her performances. Inyoka taught dance in Paris for decades, and often performed in Paris and internationally. Sculptor Paul Landowski made a series of small bronze dancing figures based on Nyota Inyoka in 1947.

== Personal life ==
Inyoka died from stomach cancer in 1971, aged 75. Her gravesite is at Père Lachaise Cemetery in Paris. Her papers are in the Bibliothèque nationale de France. There is a videocassette of Inyoka dancing in the Malvina Hoffman Papers at the Getty Institute.
