= Park Young-chul =

South Korean Olympic judoka

Personal information
- Born: 14 April 1954 (age 72)
- Occupation: Judoka

Korean name
- Hangul: 박영철
- RR: Bak Yeongcheol
- MR: Pak Yŏngch'ŏl

Sport
- Country: South Korea
- Sport: Judo
- Weight class: ‍–‍78 kg, ‍–‍80 kg

Achievements and titles
- Olympic Games: (bronze) (1976)
- World Champ.: (bronze) (1979)
Medal record
Men's judo
Representing South Korea
Olympic Games
Bronze medal – third place	1976 Montreal	‍–‍80 kg
World Championships
Bronze medal – third place	1979 Paris	‍–‍78 kg

Profile at external databases
- IJF: 54387
- JudoInside.com: 6110
- Updated on 21 June 2023

Park Young-chul (Korean: 박영철; born 14 April 1954) is a Korean former judoka who competed in the 1976 Summer Olympics.
