= Vladimír Novák =

Vladimír Novák may refer to:

- Vladimír Novák (judoka) (born 1948), Czech Olympic judoka
- Vladimír Novák (painter) (1947–2024), Czech painter
- Vladimír Novák (skier) (1904–1986), Czechoslovak Nordic skier
