= Willem Maduro =

Dutch Antillean judoka

Personal information
- Nationality: Netherlands Antillean

Sport
- Sport: Judo

Willem Maduro is a judoka who represented the Netherlands Antilles. He competed in the men's half-heavyweight event at the 1976 Summer Olympics.
