= Umi no Yarōdomo =

1957 Japanese film

- Film poster
- Directed by: Kaneto Shindō
- Written by: Kaneto Shindō
- Produced by: Hisao Itoya; Tengo Yamada
- Starring: Yujiro Ishihara; Kō Nishimura
- Cinematography: Yoshio Miyajima
- Music by: Akira Ifukube
- Production company: Nikkatsu
- Distributed by: Nikkatsu
- Release date: 21 August 1957 (Japan)
- Running time: 86 minutes
- Country: Japan
- Language: Japanese

Umi no Yarōdomo (Japanese: 海の野郎ども; lit. Bastards of the Sea), also known as Harbor Rats, is a 1957 Japanese drama film written and directed by Kaneto Shindō.

== Cast ==
- Yujiro Ishihara
- Kō Nishimura as Mekkachi
- Jerry Ito as Arab
- Kunio Suzuki as Arab
- Edward Keane as Ship's cook
- Osman Yusuf as sailor (credited as Yusuf Turko)
