= Paul Buganey =

Australian judoka

Personal information
- Nationality: Australian
- Born: 1 December 1952 (age 72)

Sport
- Sport: Judo

Paul Buganey (born 1 December 1952) is an Australian judoka. He competed in the men's middleweight event at the 1976 Summer Olympics.
