= Fred Marhenke =

German judoka

Personal information
- Nationality: German
- Born: 19 April 1950 (age 75); Sömmerda, East Germany
- Occupation: Judoka

Sport
- Sport: Judo

Profile at external databases
- JudoInside.com: 4839

Fred Marhenke (born 19 April 1950) is a German judoka. He competed in the men's middleweight event at the 1976 Summer Olympics.
