= Viðar Guðjohnsen =

Icelandic judoka (born 1958)

Personal information
- Nationality: Icelandic
- Born: 14 January 1958 (age 67)

Sport
- Sport: Judo

Viðar Guðjohnsen (born 14 January 1958) is an Icelandic judoka. He competed in the men's middleweight event at the 1976 Summer Olympics.
