= Eliudis Benítez =

Puerto Rican judoka (1954–2018)

Personal information
- Nationality: Puerto Rican
- Born: 3 September 1954; San Juan, Puerto Rico
- Died: 29 April 2018 (aged 63)

Sport
- Sport: Judo

Eliudis Benítez Hani (3 September 1954 – 29 April 2018) was a Puerto Rican judoka. He competed in the men's half-heavyweight event at the 1976 Summer Olympics.
