= Carlos Pacheco (judoka) =

Brazilian judoka (born 1957)

Personal information
- Born: 8 June 1957 (age 68); São Paulo, Brazil

Sport
- Sport: Judo

Carlos Pacheco (born 8 June 1957) is a Brazilian judoka. He competed in the men's half-heavyweight event at the 1976 Summer Olympics.
