= Gandolgoryn Batsükh =

Mongolian judoka (born 1948)

- Born: 15 May 1948 (age 77)
- Native name: Гандолгорын Батсүх
- Nationality: Mongolian
- Division: Middleweight (80 kg)
- Style: Judo
- Years active: 1970s

Gandolgoryn Batsükh (Гандолгорын Батсүх; born 15 May 1948) is a Mongolian judoka who competed in the men's middleweight event at the 1976 Summer Olympics in Montreal. He finished in a tie for 19th place.

The 1976 Olympics was the second time Mongolia had competed in Olympic judo, following their debut at the 1972 Summer Olympics in Munich. The Mongolian Judo Association had joined the Judo Union of Asia and International Judo Federation in 1972.
