= Antoni Reiter =

Polish judoka

Personal information
- Nationality: Polish
- Born: 16 March 1950 Gdańsk, Poland
- Died: 10 February 1986 (aged 35) Gdańsk, Poland

Sport
- Sport: Judo

Antoni Reiter (16 March 1950 – 10 February 1986) was a Polish judoka. He competed in the men's half-heavyweight event at the 1976 Summer Olympics.
