= Isamu Sonoda =

Japanese judoka (1946–2026)

Personal information
- Born: 4 November 1946 Yanagawa, Fukuoka, Japan
- Died: 16 July 2026 (aged 79) Fukuoka, Fukuoka, Japan
- Occupation: Judoka

Sport
- Country: Japan
- Sport: Judo
- Weight class: ‍–‍80 kg

Achievements and titles
- Olympic Games: (gold) (1976)
- World Champ.: (gold) (1969)
Medal record
Men's judo
Representing Japan
Olympic Games
Gold medal – first place	1976 Montreal	‍–‍80 kg
World Championships
Gold medal – first place	1969 Mexico City	‍–‍80 kg
Silver medal – second place	1973 Lausanne	‍–‍80 kg
Summer Universiade
Gold medal – first place	1967 Tokyo	‍–‍80 kg

Profile at external databases
- IJF: 54392
- JudoInside.com: 5481
- Updated on 21 June 2023

Isamu Sonoda (園田 勇, Sonoda Isamu; 4 November 1946 – 16 July 2026) was a Japanese Olympic champion judoka who competed in the middleweight division (‍–‍80 kg) at the 1976 Summer Olympics.

== Biography ==
Sonoda was born in Yanagawa, Fukuoka, Japan. He attended the Fukuoka Institute of Technology, and won a gold medal at the 1969 World Judo Championships along with his older brother, Yoshio, who won the gold medal in the lightweight division (‍–‍63 kg). After graduating, he began work at the Maruzen Oil Company (current Cosmo Oil Company), where he continued to practice judo. He joined the Fukuoka prefectural police force in July 1972, at the invitation of the police force's judo instructor. Sonoda had competed in the All-Japan Judo Championships 10 times from age 19, but Shozo Fujii had won the competition for three consecutive years prior to 1976, when the championship served as the qualifier for the 1976 Summer Olympics, and was seen as a lock for Japan's Olympic judo team. However, Sonoda defeated Fujii by a very close decision, gained his first appearance at the Olympics at age 29. He defeated Valeriy Dvoinikov of the Soviet Union by koka from an Osoto Gari in the finals to capture the gold medal.

He retired after competing in the 1978 Jigoro Kano Cup along with Kazuhiro Ninomiya. He and Ninomiya were rivals and friends for over 30 years, having been born in the same year, entered the same police force, competed in the same World Championships and Olympics, and having retired at the same time. He worked as a judo instructor for the Fukuoka prefectural police, and one of his pupils, Kie Kusakabe, appeared in the 2000 and 2004 Summer Olympics.

Sonoda died on 16 July 2026, at the age of 79.

== See also ==
- List of judoka
- List of Olympic medalists in judo
