= Paul Büchel =

Liechtenstein judoka (born 1953)

Personal information
- Nationality: Liechtenstein
- Born: 18 January 1953 (age 72)
- Occupation: Judoka

Sport
- Sport: Judo

Profile at external databases
- IJF: 54413
- JudoInside.com: 89520

Paul Büchel (born 18 January 1953) is a Liechtenstein judoka. He competed in the men's half-heavyweight event at the 1976 Summer Olympics.
