= Sonia Serova =

British-born American dancer (1888–1943)

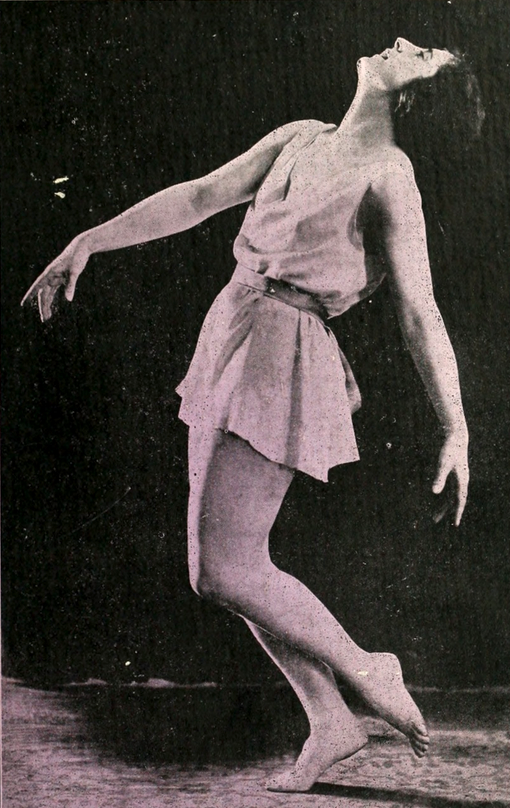
- Sonia Serova, from a 1916 publication
- Born: Eileen Mary Swepstone; April 15, 1888; London
- Died: May 9, 1943 (aged 55); High Bridge, New Jersey
- Other names: Eileen West, Maizie Stone, Aileen Swepstone, Eileen Kiefer, Alena Vestoff
- Occupation(s): Dancer, choreographer, dance educator

Sonia Serova (April 15, 1888 – May 9, 1943), born Eileen Mary Swepstone, was a British-born American modern dancer, also known as Eileen West and Eileen Kiefer. She taught dance in New York City, and published several dance education manuals, including three manuals for the dance education of very young children.

== Early life and education ==
Eileen M. Swepstone was born in London, the daughter of Harry Albemarle Swepstone and Emma Hough Swepstone. She attended Mrs. Wordsworth's School in London, and studied dance with Veronine Vestoff at the University of California in 1916.

== Career ==
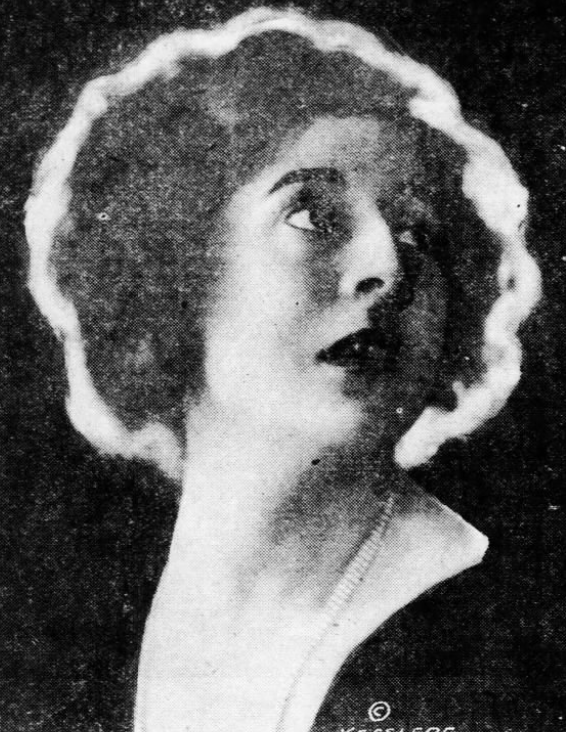
Sonia Serova, from a 1926 newspaper

As Eileen Swepstone, she acted and danced in local theatre productions in British Columbia in 1912, 1913, 1914, and 1916. She danced with partner Bernard Tweedale in theatres in the Pacific Northwest, including in Alaska, and wrote an instructional pamphlet on the tango. She began teaching children ballet and performing in San Francisco by 1916.

Using the Russian-sounding name "Sonia Serova", she and her first husband founded the Vestoff-Serova Russian School of Dancing in New York City in 1917. Serova was noted especially for teaching very young children in her classes, "as early as four years, but never younger". "The only way to get anything out of a baby is to be a baby oneself, and so I just play I'm about four years old when teaching the Tinies," she explained in her book, Baby Work.

Serova did a series of performances with Michio Itō from 1920-1921. Her dance company was the subject of an experimental sound film in 1924, Sonia Serova Dancers, made by Lee de Forest. She also directed and choreographed programs at Radio City Music Hall, Madison Square Garden and the Skating Club of New York. She taught from a studio at Steinway Hall, and in New Jersey, in her later years.

== Publications ==
- How to Dance the Tango (1914 pamphlet, with Bernard Tweedale)
- Nature Dancing: The Poetry of Motion (1916)
- Baby Work (1917)
- Talented Tots (1925)
- Childhood Rhythms (1926)
- Technique of Toe Dancing: A Graded Text Book for Students on Pointes (1934)

== Personal life and legacy ==
Swepstone married fellow dancer Charles West, also known as Veronine Vestoff, in 1917. They had a daughter, Cynthia, born in 1918. She died in 1943, in High Bridge, New Jersey. The Serova School of Dance in Somerville, New Jersey, was opened by her daughter in 1954.
