= Koh Eng Kian =

Singaporean judoka

Personal information
- Nationality: Singaporean
- Born: 1 November 1956 (age 68)

Sport
- Sport: Judo

Koh Eng Kian (born 1 November 1956) is a Singaporean judoka. He competed in the men's half-heavyweight event at the 1976 Summer Olympics.
