= Jong In-chol =

North Korean judoka (born 1957)

Personal information
- Nationality: North Korean
- Born: 20 October 1957 (age 67)

Sport
- Sport: Judo

Jong In-chol (Korean: 정인철; born 20 October 1957) is a North Korean judoka. He competed in the men's middleweight event at the 1976 Summer Olympics.
