= Charlotte Remfry =

Spanish writer

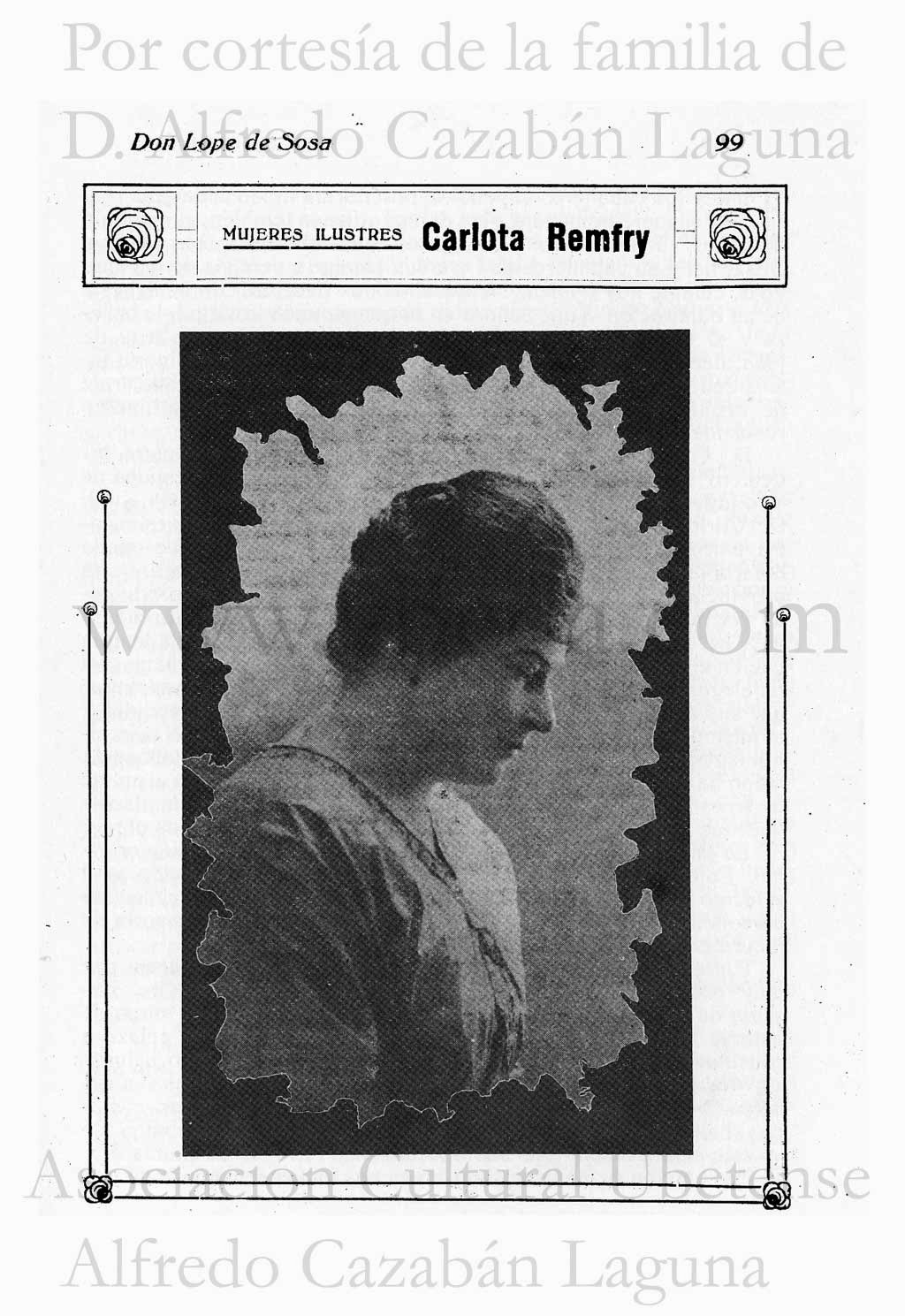
Carlota Remfry

Charlotte Elizabeth Frederica Remfry Koesler (also known as Carlota Remfry-Kidd; 1869–1957) was a Spanish writer, born in Linares, Jaén, where she died, being the last person of English ancestry buried in the Cementerio inglés de Linares. She married Thomas Kidd Curry in 1946. The Official Gazette of Junta de Andalucía (BOJA) In its Order of 1 July 2007, approved the name "Carlota Remfry" for the Official Language School of Linares.

== Career ==
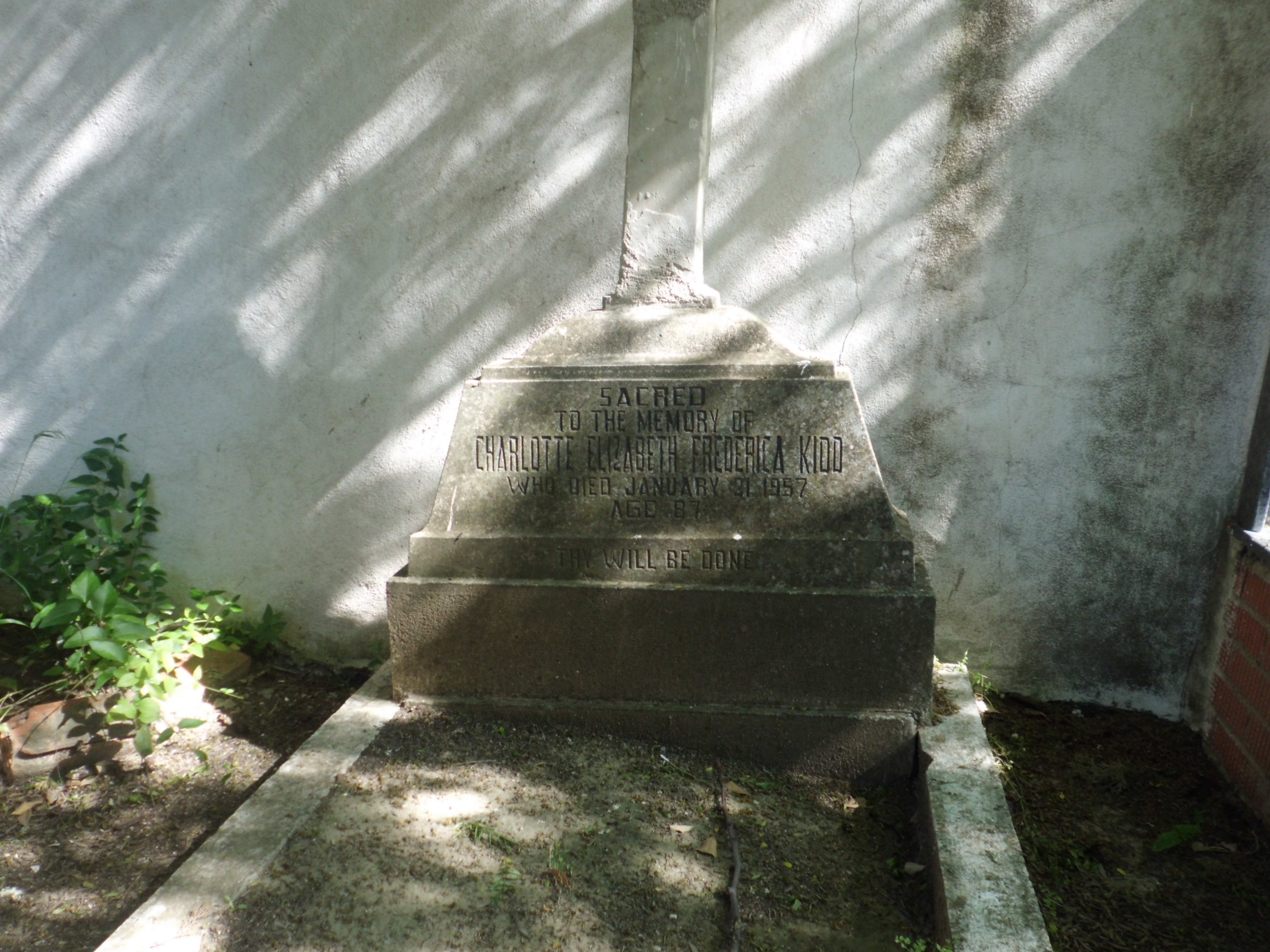
Charlotte Remfry's tomb at cementerio inglés de Linares

She is the author of Linarejos y otros cuentos (Madrid: Ínsula, 1950), Cuentos que te re-cuento (Jaén, 2011), as well as a translator of a considerable number of works, first, from Spanish and French into English and later, from French and English into Spanish. Of the former, this includes Les yeux qui s'ouvrent, by Henry Bordeaux (1910); Marie-Claire, by Marguerite Audoux (1911); Fire in Stubble and By the Gods Beloved, by Emma Orczy, in the early 1920. Among the English translations, are Αngel-Child (1926) and Maya; The Adventures of a Bee (published by Hutchinson's Books for young People, London, c. 1942), of Waldemar Bonsels; Nuestro Padre San Daniel of Gabriel Miró (1930) or The Vagrant, of Colette (1931), which is her last known translation.

She was a frequent contributor to magazines such as Mundo Latino, Los Quijotes; Mesa Revuelta, La Voz de la Mujer, Cervantes (Madrid); La Alhambra (Granada); Grecia (Seville).
