= Pak Jong-gil =

North Korean judoka

Personal information
- Nationality: North Korean
- Born: 14 January 1951 (age 74)

Sport
- Sport: Judo

Pak Jong -gil (Korean: 박종길, born 14 January 1951) is a North Korean judoka. He competed in the men's heavyweight event at the 1976 Summer Olympics.
