= Thomas Martin (judoka) =

American judoka

Thomas "Tommy" Martin (August 28, 1956 - February 4, 2023) Stockton California, is a former Olympic judoka.

He was a member of the 1976 and 1980 US Olympic Teams. The only Olympic Games he participated in was in Montreal, Canada. In 1975 he was selected to the Black Belt Magazine Hall of Fame.
