= Haruki Uemura =

Japanese judoka (born 1951)

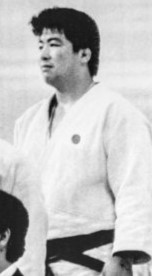

Personal information
- Born: 14 February 1951 (age 75)
- Occupation: Judoka

Sport
- Country: Japan
- Sport: Judo
- Weight class: +95 kg, Open
- Rank: 9th dan black belt

Achievements and titles
- Olympic Games: (gold) (1976)
- World Champ.: (1975)
Medal record
Men's judo
Representing Japan
Olympic Games
Gold medal – first place	1976 Montreal	Open
World Championships
Gold medal – first place	1975 Vienna	Open
Silver medal – second place	1973 Lausanne	Open

Profile at external databases
- IJF: 54447
- JudoInside.com: 5497
- Updated on 21 June 2023

Haruki Uemura (上村 春樹, Uemura Haruki; born 14 February 1951 in Uki, Kumamoto) is a judoka from Japan, who won the gold medal in the Open class at the 1976 Summer Olympics in Montreal. In the final of the Olympic tournament in Canada he defeated Great Britain's Keith Remfry. In 2009 Uemura was elected President of Kodokan and awarded the rank of 9th dan.

== Awards and honors ==
- 2025 - Person of Cultural Merit
