= Johan Schåltz =

Swedish judoka

Personal information
- Nationality: Swedish
- Born: 27 August 1953 (age 71); Stockholm, Sweden

Sport
- Sport: Judo

Johan Schåltz (born 27 August 1953) is a Swedish judoka. He competed in the men's half-heavyweight event at the 1976 Summer Olympics.
