= José Luis de Frutos =

Spanish judoka

Personal information
- Full name: José Luis de Frutos
- Nationality: Spanish
- Born: 18 September 1949; Madrid, Spain
- Died: 26 June 2006 (aged 56); Madrid, Spain

Sport
- Sport: Judo

José Luis de Frutos (18 September 1949 – 26 June 2006) was a Spanish judoka. He competed in the men's middleweight event at the 1976 Summer Olympics.
