= Cho Jea-ki =

South Korean Olympic judoka (born 1950)

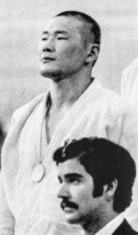

Personal information
- Born: 17 March 1950 (age 76)
- Occupation: Judoka

Korean name
- Hangul: 조재기
- Hanja: 趙在基
- RR: Jo Jaegi
- MR: Cho Chaegi

Sport
- Country: South Korea
- Sport: Judo
- Weight class: +95 kg, Open

Achievements and titles
- Olympic Games: (bronze) (1976)
- World Champ.: (bronze) (1979)
- Asian Champ.: (bronze) (1974)
Medal record
Men's judo
Representing South Korea
Olympic Games
Bronze medal – third place	1976 Montreal	Open
World Championships
Bronze medal – third place	1979 Paris	+95 kg
Asian Championships
Bronze medal – third place	1974 Seoul	Open

Profile at external databases
- IJF: 54411
- JudoInside.com: 6075
- Updated on 21 June 2023

Cho Jea-ki (born 17 March 1950) is a Korean former judoka who competed in the 1976 Summer Olympics.
