= José Cornavaca =

Nicaraguan judoka

Personal information
- Nationality: Nicaraguan
- Born: 13 April 1956 (age 68)

Sport
- Sport: Judo

José Cornavaca (born 13 April 1956) is a Nicaraguan judoka. He competed in the men's half-heavyweight event at the 1976 Summer Olympics.
