= Süheyl Yeşilnur =

Turkish judoka

Personal information
- Nationality: Turkish
- Born: 29 May 1953 (age 73)
- Occupation: Judoka
- Height: 176 cm (5 ft 9 in)

Sport
- Country: Turkey
- Sport: Judo
- Weight class: –70 kg, –78 kg, –80 kg
Medal record
Men's Judo
Representing Turkey
Mediterranean Games
Silver medal – second place	1971 İzmir	–70 kg
Bronze medal – third place	1975 Algiers	–80 kg
Bronze medal – third place	1979 Split	–78 kg

Süheyl Yeşilnur (born 29 May 1953) is a Turkish judoka who competed internationally in the 1970s and 1980s. He represented Turkey at the 1976 Summer Olympics and 1984 Summer Olympics.

== Career ==
Yeşilnur competed in the –70 kg, –78 kg, and –80 kg weight categories during his career. He won a silver medal at the 1971 Mediterranean Games in İzmir, and bronze medals at the 1975 Mediterranean Games in Algiers and the 1979 Mediterranean Games in Split.

At the 1976 Summer Olympics in Montreal, he competed in the men's half-middleweight (–80 kg) division, finishing seventh. He also competed in the men's middleweight (–78 kg) division at the 1984 Summer Olympics in Los Angeles, where he finished twelfth.

Yeşilnur also represented Turkey at the 1973 World Judo Championships.

During the 1976 Olympics, he defeated Pedro Santos in the first round but lost to Walerii Dwojnikow in the second. In repechage, he defeated Ricardo Elmont before losing to José Luis de Frutos, finishing seventh overall.

At the 1984 Olympics, he defeated Fridtjof Thoen, Ignacio Sanz, and António Roquete, before losing to Filip Leščak in the fourth round, finishing twelfth overall.
