= Carlos Motta (judoka) =

Brazilian judoka (1955–2018)

Personal information
- Full name: Carlos Eduardo Santos Motta
- Born: February 25, 1955 São Paulo, SP
- Died: October 30, 2018 (aged 63)
Medal record
Men's Judo
Representing Brazil
Pan American Games
Silver medal – second place	1975 Mexico City	Middleweight (-80 kg)

Carlos Eduardo Santos Motta (February 25, 1955 – October 30, 2018) was a competitive judoka from Brazil, who represented his native country at the 1976 Summer Olympics in Montréal, Quebec, Canada. Nicknamed "Tico" he won the silver medal at the 1975 Pan American Games in the men's middleweight division (– 80 kg), after a loss in the final against Canada's Rainer Fischer.
