= Endre Kiss =

Hungarian judoka

Personal information
- Nationality: Hungarian
- Born: 31 August 1947; Kecskemét, Hungary
- Died: 5 September 2006 (aged 59)

Sport
- Sport: Judo

Endre Kiss (31 August 1947 – 5 September 2006) was a Hungarian judoka. He competed at the 1976 Summer Olympics and the 1980 Summer Olympics.
