= Pedro Santos (judoka) =

Puerto Rican judoka

Personal information
- Nationality: Puerto Rican
- Born: 14 May 1955 (age 69)

Sport
- Sport: Judo

Pedro Santos (born 14 May 1955) is a Puerto Rican judoka. He competed in the men's middleweight event at the 1976 Summer Olympics.
