= Ibrahim Muzaffer =

Kuwaiti judoka

Personal information
- Full name: Ibrahim Khalil Muzaffer
- Nationality: Kuwaiti
- Born: 25 March 1953 (age 73)
- Height: 170 cm (5 ft 7 in)
- Weight: 77 kg (170 lb)

Sport
- Sport: Judo

Ibrahim Khalil Muzaffer (ابراهيم خليل مظفر) (born 25 March 1953) is a Kuwaiti former judoka. He competed at the 1976 Summer Olympics and the 1980 Summer Olympics. He was selected to be the flag bearer during the 1980 Summer Olympics opening ceremony.

Muzaffer was in 1976 the first Judoka that represented Kuwait at the Olympics.
