= Keith Remfry =

British judoka (1947–2015)

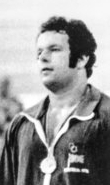

Personal information
- Born: 17 November 1947
- Died: 16 September 2015 (aged 67)
- Occupation: Judoka

Sport
- Country: Great Britain
- Sport: Judo
- Weight class: +93 kg, Open

Achievements and titles
- Olympic Games: (silver) (1976)
- World Champ.: (bronze) (1971, 1973)
- European Champ.: (silver) (1973)
Medal record
Men's judo
Representing Great Britain
Olympic Games
Silver medal – second place	1976 Montreal	Open
World Championships
Bronze medal – third place	1971 Ludwigshafen	+93 kg
Bronze medal – third place	1973 Lausanne	+93 kg
European Championships
Silver medal – second place	1973 Madrid	+93 kg
European Junior Championships
Silver medal – second place	1968 London	+93 kg

Profile at external databases
- IJF: 54430
- JudoInside.com: 4987
- Updated on 21 June 2023

Keith Remfry (17 November 1947 – 16 September 2015) was a judoka from the United Kingdom, who won the silver medal in the Open class at the 1976 Summer Olympics in Montreal, Quebec, Canada. He lost to Japan's Haruki Uemura, the reigning world openweight champion, in the final of the Olympic tournament.

Remfry died at the age of 67, on 16 September 2015, following a series of prolonged illnesses.
