= Johann Pollak =

Austrian judoka (1948–2019)

Personal information
- Nationality: Austrian
- Born: 23 December 1948; Linz, Austria
- Died: 15 September 2019 (aged 70)
- Occupation: Judoka

Sport
- Sport: Judo

Profile at external databases
- JudoInside.com: 8729

Johann Pollak (23 December 1948 – 15 September 2019) was an Austrian judoka. He competed at the 1972 Summer Olympics and the 1976 Summer Olympics.
