= Jorge Portelli =

Argentine judoka

Personal information
- Nationality: Argentine
- Born: 12 December 1950 (age 74)

Sport
- Sport: Judo

Jorge Portelli (born 12 December 1950) is an Argentine judoka. He competed in the men's half-heavyweight event at the 1976 Summer Olympics.
