= Goran Žuvela =

Croatian judoka (born 1948)

Personal information
- Nationality: Croatian
- Born: 12 October 1948 (age 76); Vela Luka, Yugoslavia

Sport
- Sport: Judo

Goran Žuvela (born 12 October 1948) is a Croatian judoka. He competed in the men's half-heavyweight event at the 1976 Summer Olympics, representing Yugoslavia.
