= Abdoulaye Djiba =

Senegalese judoka (born 1938)

Personal information
- Nationality: Senegalese
- Born: 7 July 1938
- Died: 12 May 2014 (aged 75)

Sport
- Sport: Judo

Abdoulaye Djiba (7 July 1938 – 12 May 2014) was a Senegalese judoka. He competed at the 1972 Summer Olympics and the 1976 Summer Olympics.
