= Michio Itō =

Japanese dancer and choreographer

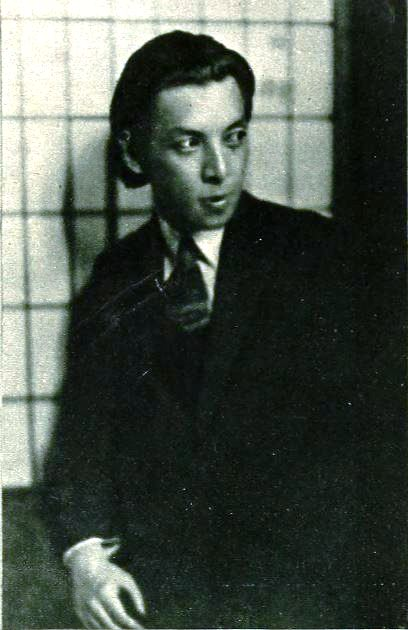
- 1919
- Born: April 13, 1892; Tokyo, Japan
- Died: November 6, 1961 (aged 69); Tokyo, Japan
- Occupations: dancer and choreographer
- Children: 2, including Jerry Ito
- Relatives: Koreya Senda (brother)

Michio Itō (伊藤 道郎, Itō Michio; 13 April 1892 – 6 November 1961) was a Japanese dancer who developed his own choreography style in Europe and America. He was the son of Kimiye Iijima and architect Tamekichi Ito who was educated at the University of Washington; he was one of nine children, and the brother of director Koreya Senda.

== Europe ==
In 1915, when he was planning to perform in London, Itō collaborated with the English composer Gustav Holst on the musical accompaniment. As a starting point for the basic themes, Holst sat and took notes while Itō whistled Japanese folk tunes to him, providing most of the themes. The result was Holst's orchestral work, the Japanese Suite, Op. 33.

Although he had very little money, Itō moved within the artistic community and high society during his time in London. He was friends with Ezra Pound, and his social circle included Lady Cunard and Thomas Beecham. He danced a Chopin waltz, accompanied by an orchestra conducted by Henry Wood.

Itō left Japan as a teenager to study classic music in Paris. After learning musical theory using Dalcroze eurhythmics in Hellerau in Germany, he started to explore modern dance. He was an associate of William Butler Yeats, Angna Enters, Isamu Noguchi, Louis Horst, Ted Shawn, Martha Graham, Lillian Powell, Vladimir Rosing, Pauline Koner, Madame Sonia Serova, Lester Horton and others. He danced with the Anglo-Indian dancer Roshanara in 1917, and with French-Indian dancer Nyota Inyoka in 1923–1924.

In 1923, he married dancer Hazel Agnes Wright (1902 -1971), who performed professionally as Hazel Wright; they divorced in 1936. They had two children, Donald (1925–1969) and Gerald. Their son Gerald "Jerry" Tamekichi Ito (1927–2007) became an actor.

== New York ==
He was active in New York City from 1916 until 1929, when he moved to California. In New York he collaborated with friend and composer Kōsaku Yamada. His works in New York included "Bushido" (1916),"Tamura" (1918), "Cherry Blossoms" (1927), "Nuages et Fetes" (1929), and "Turando"(1929). He was particularly well-known for "The Pinwheel Review" (1923) and for being a headliner in William Collier's "Ching-a-Ling Revue" (1927) which featured many well-known performers such as: the Three Meyakos (whose real names were Esther, Florence and George Kudara); Hisako Koine; and J. Ah Chung and E. Don Sang (formerly vaudeville performers in the Chung Hwa Four).

While in New York he championed the idea of a performance space for dancers. This idea resulted in the Theatre Arts Building which was managed by the Dance Guild, Inc., and provided two theatres and 250 studios with living quarters.

== California ==
He moved to California in 1929 at the start of the Great Depression. He worked on several movies during this time, though his work was not always credited. In 1931, he opened Michio Ito Studios, his dance school at Hollywood Boulevard and Wilton Place. His wife, Hazel Wright, was on the faculty there. Dorothy Wagner and Jessmin Howarth were also listed as instructors at the school. He performed several symphonic dance poems at the Hollywood Bowl, including ones to "Prince Igor" and "Scheherazade". These events were spectacular due to the size of the performance; they featured one hundred twenty-five dancers, a two hundred person choir and an orchestra of one hundred musicians.

In 1931, the Itōs travelled to Japan. His party included his wife Hazel Wright, their two children, along with some performers. The visit marked a homecoming for Itō who had been gone from Japan for nearly twenty years. Five performances were held in the two months he was in Japan. One performance was marred by an arrest of Hazel Wright during her performance at the International Club in Tokyo. An Inspector General and five policeman interrupted the performance by making an arrest for "social dancing." Tangos and Waltzes were perceived as a moral hazard in Japan during this period and were prohibited. Itō and the club's chairman supplied the permits and approvals they had received along with arguments that the dancing on stage exempted them from the current regulations. Their release occurred at two in the morning, and their arguments must have been successful because further police actions were avoided.

In 1939, Itō surprised many when he assisted Sally Rand, one of his former students, with a benefit to support a repertory dance theater group. Rand and Itō performed a duet at the event. Earlier the previous year he choreographed the "Dance of the Peacock" for her movie The Sunset Murder Case (1938).

Itō travelled to Japan in 1939 for his parents' fiftieth wedding anniversary.

== World War II and Internment ==
In 1941, Itō was arrested and held at four different internment facilities; first in Montana (Fort Missoula), Oklahoma (Fort Sill), Louisiana (Camp Livingston), and New Mexico (Santa Fe). He was eventually deported from the United States after the outbreak of World War II. His son "Jerry" Ito served in the U.S. Navy during the war. Itō and his second wife, Tsuyako, sailed to Goa, India aboard the MS Gripsholm and then on to Yokohama, Japan via the Teia Maru (formerly known as the MS Aramis) as part of a prisoner exchange. They arrived in Yokohama on November 14, 1943.

== Post War Years In Japan ==
Upon arriving in Japan, he told newspapers at a press conference that "the American fighting spirit cannot be underestimated." Upon arrival, he worked creating the Greater East Asia Stage Arts Research Institute. After Japan surrendered in 1945, he was chosen to manage the Ernie Pyle Theatre which was created by the United States to entertain American troops. Japanese citizens were not allowed to attend performances. "Fantasy Japonica" was his first production there, "Jungle Drums" (1946), "Sakura Flowers" (1947) and "Rhapsody In Blue" (1947) performances also received press attention. While at the Ernie Pyle, he brought his brother Kisaku Ito on as Scenic Designer. In 1948, Ito was permitted to mount a production for the Japanese public of Gilbert and Sullivan's The Mikado. His work was not restricted to the Ernie Pyle as he put on other performances in Japan during this time. He also formed a dancing school while in Tokyo. The Ernie Pyle continued as an American Theatre until after his death; finally closing in 1966 and reverting to the original Japanese owners.

He was creator of the "Holiday In Japan" show for the New Frontier Hotel in Las Vegas.

In 1960, Itō was chosen to direct two of the 1964 Tokyo Olympics events: the Torch Relay and the opening ceremony. Articles reveal that he had plans for the Olympic torch bearers to leave Greece following the path of Marco Polo to Japan. His plans for the Olympics were not realized. He died on 6 November 1961, at the age of 67.

== Cinematography ==
- Song of India (1920)
- Dawn of the East (1921)
- Lotus Land (1928)
- No, No Nanette (1930) contributed "Japanese Ballet" sequence to the movie
- Madame Butterfly (1932)
- Spawn of the North (1938)
- The Sunset Murder Case (1941)
