= Let's Play English =

Japanese TV show

Let's play English is Japanese TV program that has been on air since April 2, 1990. It evolved to Let's play English with Orton on April 3, 2017.

== Cast ==
- Atsugiri Jason
- Rie Tanaka
- Naomi Claire
- Mary Allen
- Akira Sasamoto

== Main corner ==
Eat the world
The characters cook the meals in the world.
Dear Karie
Karie plays with the kids and parents.
Quiz Corner
Dr. Jayson and his mates push the buttons which speak English words. It is said only once.
Orton's exercise
Rie Tanaka dances exercise.
