= Teimoc Johnston-Ono =

American judoka

Teimoc Johnston-Ono (born July 26, 1955) is an Olympic judo competitor and instructor. He has won the World Masters tournament in both judo and Brazilian jiu-jitsu, making him the only person to have done so along with Claudio Calasans.

== Career ==
Teimoc's martial arts training started during the summer of 1960 in the basement of a Buddhist church. His father believed judo, kendo, aikido, and kyūdō were essential parts of an education, so aged six he began his lifelong study of Judo. Four years later, at the 1964 World's Fair, he demonstrated the art of Judo and Kendo at the Japanese pavilion, and over the following years he progressed rapidly in both disciplines. Amongst his instructors were Kiyoshi Shiina, Wally Jay, and Jim Bregman.

At the age of 16, Teimoc became one of the youngest Judo practitioners to receive the rank of Black Belt, winning titles in the Junior and Senior divisions, and in the High School Nationals the same year. He remained an accomplished high school wrestler and undefeated practitioner throughout his wrestling career. In 1971 he qualified as an alternate for the 1972 Olympic Games, which earned him the nickname "The Kid". Four years later he captured a coveted spot on the Judo team for the 1976 Olympics, placing 13th.

Teimoc retired from competition in 1990 to become Head Coach of the US Olympic training center in Colorado Springs, and two years later he returned to his home in New York City to direct the Chelsea Piers Martial Arts program. He has also maintained a teaching, coaching, and representative position for the New York Athletic Club for over 40 years. As of 2009, he is head trainer of the 5 Points Academy in Chinatown, NYC.

=== Return to competitions ===
After a 14-year layoff, Teimoc returned to international competitions, redefining his training methodology to adapt. His new approach worked well as he is not only still active in competition, but has a winning record to prove it. Today he does the majority of his strength training and conditioning at the Parisi Speed School alongside athletes from the UFC, the IFL, and the NFL.

In 2003 Teimoc went to Brazil to compete in the World Masters Jiu-Jitsu tournament, which he won. To date, he is the only non-Brazilian to win both the Black Belt division and the Absolute Black Belt division. Returning in 2006, 2007 and 2008, he consecutively took back home first place awards in both divisions. He also received a Black belt in Brazilian jiu-jitsu in 2006. Teimoc is the only practitioner to win the prestigious World Masters competition in both Judo and Brazilian jiu-jitsu.

== Family ==
Teimoc's brothers, Genji Ito and Teiji Ito were accomplished Japanese composers and performers. His mother, Teiko Ono, was a traditional and classical genre dancer.

== Competition results ==
=== Judo ===
- High School Nationals–135 lbs., First Place
- Junior National Champion First Place 4X (USJA, USJF, Junior Olympics)

=== US National Championships Seniors ===
- 1988 Third Place
- 1987 Third Place
- 1983 Third Place
- 1982 Second Place
- 1981 Second Place
- 1980 Third Place
- 1978 First Place
- 1976 First Place
- 1972 Second Place

=== US Open ===
- 1989 Second Place
- 1986 Third Place
- 1981 Third Place (86 kg) & Open Division Third Place
- 1980 Third Place

=== Judo World Masters Championship ===
- 2008 Brussels, Belgium - Gold
- 2007 São Paulo, Brazil - Silver
- 2006 Tours, France - Silver
- 2005 Toronto, Ontario, Canada - Bronze
- 2003 Tokyo, Japan - Silver

=== Other Competition ===
- 2009 IJF Judo Veteran World Championship Bronze Medal, Germany.
- 2009 NYinternational open First place, World masters (Rio) Jiu Jitsu First place, International masters (San Diego) First place, Judo.
- 2009 WMJA World Championship, Gold Medal, 90 kg. M5, Atlanta, Ga.
- 2009 World Masters Jiu Jitsu Championships, Black Belt Division, First Place absolute Division
- 2008 World Masters Jiu Jitsu Championships, Black Belt Division, First Place and First Place absolute Division
- 2007 World Masters Jiu Jitsu Championships, Black Belt Division, First Place and First Place absolute Division
- 2006 World Masters Jiu Jitsu Championships, Black Belt Division, First Place and First Place absolute Division
- 2005 NAGA World Championships, Brown Belt Division, Gi, First Place
- 2004 Grapplers Quest, Gi, First Place and no Gi, Second Place
- 2004 NAGA World Jiu Jitsu Championships, Gi, First Place and First Place Masters (no rank)
- 2004 World Masters Jiu Jitsu Championships, Purple Belt Division, First Place and First Place Absolute Division
- 2003 World Masters Jiu Jitsu Championships, Blue Belt Division, First Place and First Place Absolute Division
- 1990 Quebec Open, Third Place JIUJITSU
- 1990 Cuban Cup, Third Place
- 1990 West German Open, Competitor
- 1990 Paris International, Competitor
- 1990 Tbilisi International Invitation, Competitor
- 1986 National Sports Festival, Second Place
- 1984 Dutch Open, Fourth Place
- 1983 US Wrestling Federation, National Open, Sombo Champion (90 kg)
- 1983 Pacific Rim, Bronze (as member of US National Team)
- 1979 Mexican Open, First Place
- 1978 AAU National Championships, First Place
- 1977 South African Championships for US National Team, First Place
- 1977 World Championship Trials, First Place
- 1977 Canadian National Exhibition, First Place
- 1976 AAU National Championships, US All American, First Place
- 1972 US Judo Tour, Japan

=== Recent awards ===
- Promotion to 8th dan judo (USAJUDO/IJF)
- First degree Black Belt (USBJJF/IBJJF)
- Black Belt (Renzo Gracie Academy)
