= Sadaki Nakabayashi =

Judo teacher and author

Sadaki Nakabayashi (September 14, 1916 – September 29, 1977) is a former judo teacher and author. Nakabayashi authored a number of judo books including Judo, (Athletic Institute series) in 1968, How to Improve Your Judo in 1960, Fundamentals of judo in 1964. He also wrote the book fundamentals of Judo along with George Uchida and Olympic Coach Yoshihiro Uchida Nakabayshi taught for a period at the Kodokan. Nakabayashi is considered to be one of the best Judo instructors to have been sent to the United States.

== World War II ==
Nakabayashi was a soldier in the Japanese Army in World War II. He attended Kokushikan Judo College / Kokushikan University where he majored in Judo and Kendo. He was an instructor of Taiho Jutsu.

== Judo ==
He started learning Judo at the age of 12 in 1927. He served as the second degree, third degree, and forth degree black belt college Judo champion. Nakabayshi was brought to the United States by the US Air Force to teach judo and later served as the chief instructor at the New York Athletic Club. He established the Judo Program at West Point. He was key in the development of the 1964 US Olympic Team. As a 7th Dan, he served as a technical adviser for the United States Judo Federation. and was considered one of the best judo instructors of the time. In 1964, he was the highest ranking Judoka in the United States. By 1969 he was the highest ranking judo instructors in the Eastern United States and eventually earned the rank of 9th Dan. He would serve as a kata judge for Nage-no-kata. He would serve as the as a judge in the AAU Women's Kata Championships. Nagabayshi emphasized the changing nature of throws in Judo.

== Author ==
In 1960, Sadaki Nakabayashi co-authored a book with Henry Okamura and others called How to Improve Your Judo.

== Students ==
Nakabayashi's students included the judo twins. Nakabayshi firmly believed that judo was growing and changing from the older techniques. Another of his students was Bernard Lepkofker and Ron Hoffman.

As early as 1973, he had organized the Nakabayshi Judo Invitational Tournament.
