= Jesse Jones =

Jesse Jones may refer to:

- Jesse S. Jones (1860–1931), American politician
- Jesse H. Jones (1874–1956), American politician and entrepreneur
- Jesse Jones (judoka) (1936–2014), American judoka
- Jesse Fuller Jones (fl. 19th century), owner of Jesse Fuller Jones House, a historic plantation house in North Carolina
- Jesse D. Jones (fl. 1940s), commander of the USS Henry County
- Jesse Jones, a character in Universal Soldier

== See also ==
- Jesse H. Jones High School
- Jesse H. Jones Graduate School of Business
- Jessica Jones (disambiguation)
- Jones Hall, or Jesse H. Jones Hall for the Performing Arts
