= Felix De Smedt =

Belgian judoka

Personal information
- Nationality: Belgian
- Born: 16 August 1923 Schelle, Belgium
- Died: 2 August 2012 (aged 88) Mechelen, Belgium
- Occupation(s): Judo instructor and police inspector
- Years active: 1941-2001
- Spouse: Jeannine Meulemans (m. 1977–2012)

Sport
- Country: Belgium
- Sport: Judo
- Rank: BJB 2nd dan & BKFS 6th dan
- Club: Royal Judo & Karate Academy Bushido-Kwai Mechelen
- Coached by: Erich Rahn, Jean de Herdt, Ger F.M. Schutte, Tokio Hirano
- Updated on 30 November 2012

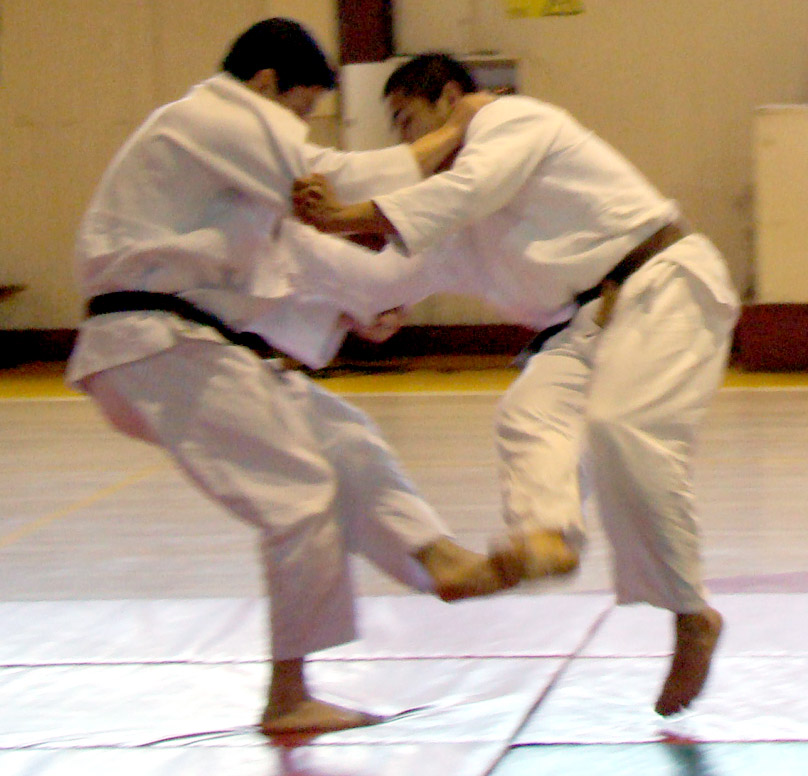
Two men practice Judo

Felix De Smedt (16 August 1923, Schelle, Belgium – 2 August 2012, Mechelen, Belgium) was a Belgian judoka who is credited with introducing the sport to Belgium. In January 1941, he studied judo formally in Berlin, and was the first Belgian to have done so. On 20 May 1946, he founded the first Belgian judo club in Schelle near Boom in the province of Antwerp, the Judo and Jujutsu Academy Bushido-Kwai. On 14 March 1951, the club was relocated to Mechelen. On 28 November 1996, it became the first Belgian judo club to be awarded the predicate Royal: the club is called the Royal Judo and Karate Academy Bushido-Kwai Mechelen. In October 1950, De Smedt co-founded the Bel. A. J. A. The Bel A. J. A. and the Association Fédérale Belge de Judo et Ju Jitsu (AFBJJ) (created 6 June 1949) were the predecessors to the Belgian Judo Federation. As an instructor, De Smedt was known for his emphasis on highly technical and clean judo, eschewing the use of blunt force.

== Early life ==
De Smedt was born in Schelle, a Flemish municipality in the province of Antwerp, Belgium. At the age of twelve, Felix De Smedt was introduced to wrestling by his uncle, a skilled wrestler. After the start of hostilities in Belgium on 10 May 1940, De Smedt accompanied his father to work in Moissac near Toulouse in southern France where he wrestled.

== Career ==
=== Judo training ===
In 1940, adult males (16–35 years) of Belgium were sent by German occupying forces to Germany to work. In 1940, De Smedt and his father returned to Belgium and were sent to Berlin. Between December 1940 and January 1941, while in Berlin, De Smedt came across a jujutsu and judo demonstration which was being held in the open air along the famous Berlin boulevard, Unter den Linden, as part of a larger German charity event called Das Winterhilfswerk. The group was practicing under the guidance of Erich Rahn.

From 1903, Rahn had studied Japanese jujutsu with Katsukuma Higashi who regularly visited Germany, and had opened Germany's first jujutsu school in 1906. In 1912 and 1935 Rahn's jujutsu school was visited by Jigoro Kano. Inspired by Jigoro Kano, Rahn opened a judo division in his school.

De Smedt was impressed the demonstration and in January 1941, he became a member of the Jujutsu and Judo Verein Erich Rahn, which was located in a Berlin movie theatre. After two years of practice De Smedt obtained a jujutsu and judo teacher's diploma issued by Rahn. De Smedt continued his practice until the movie theatre was bombed in 1943. In that same year, De Smedt was relocated to Düsseldorf. He returned to Belgium in July 1945.

=== Formation of judo clubs ===
On 20 May 1946, De Smedt opened the first Belgian judo club, the Judo and Jujutsu Academy Bushido-Kwai, located in a room at the back of his parents' cafe in Schelle, near Boom. Later that year, De Smedt, opened a second judo club, Ojigi, in Kiel, Antwerp at the request of Camiel Van Haesendonck (the brother of François Van Haesendonck). It operated in a backroom of Van Haesendonck's parents' cafe, De Familiekring.

De Smedt and Van Haesendonck increased their expertise under Maurice Van Nieuwenhuizen (Dutch) and Jean de Herdt (French national and first and multiple European champion). In November 1949, de Herdt promoted De Smedt to blue belt 2nd kyu, and in June 1950 to brown belt 1st kyu.

=== Judo black belt exams ===
The presence of de Herdt in Brussels led to a schism among some Flemish clubs in the region around Antwerp who, until that point, had been working with De Smedt, Van Haesendonck and a Dutchman, Van Nieuwenhuizen. In October 1951, the first Belgian judo shodan black belt exams for members of the AFBJJ, were held in Brussels, presided over by de Herdt. De Smedt and Van Haesendonck, who were not members of the AFBJJ, were not informed of the exams. Thus, several of their pupils became judo black belts before they did.

BEL.A.J.A. attracted Jean Beaujean (a former colleague of de Herdt) as their visiting expert. In February 1952, the first BEL.A.J.A. black belt exams were held. Again, De Smedt was not informed. Thus Van Haesendonck and Victor Van Gich, the BEL.A.J.A.'s president, became black belts before De Smedt. De Smedt was promoted to shodan black belt in September 1952 by Ger F. M. 'Opa' Schutte (Dutch), a student of Tokio Hirano. De Smedt was introduced to Tokio Hirano by Schutte, and became a first-generation and dedicated student of Hirano from 1952 until Hirano left.

=== Later career ===
De Smedt pioneered judo instruction to the police in Belgium starting in the early 1950s, as well as creating children's and women's judo programs. Among his students are: Gustaaf De Waele, François Van Onckelen (-60 kg), Jeannine Meulemans (women's -56 kg), Carl De Crée (-78 kg), and Sonja Maes (women's -72 kg).

In 1993, disappointed with the commercialization of judo and federal policies, De Smedt left the Flemish Judo Federation (the Flemish regional sub-federation of the Belgian Judo Federation). From 2001 he transferred his club's judo instruction to others, but remained active as his club's president.

== Death ==
During his final years, old age started limiting his mobility. De Smedt died in his sleep in the early morning of 2 August 2012, aged 88. At the time of his death De Smedt held the judo rank of nidan (second degree black belt) to which he had been promoted by Tokio Hirano and which had been recognized by the Belgian Judo Federation through its technical director Ichiro Abe; he also held the rank of 6th degree black belt in his club's Judo-Karate fighting system, based on a combination of Kodokan judo and Ashihara karate. On 10 October 2012, the city of Mechelen named their new judo dojo after De Smedt in honor of his contributions to judo.
