= Judo in the United States =

- Country: United States
- Governing body: USA Judo
- National team: United States Olympics team

International competitions
- Pan American Judo Championships; World Judo Championships; Summer Olympics

There are three main organizations that govern judo in the United States. The United States Judo Federation (USJF) started in 1952. The concentration of the USJF is on the east and west coasts, but also in Chicago and Hawaii. The United States Judo Association (USJA) was founded in 1968 as an extension of the Armed Forces Judo Association (AFJA) when it broke off from the USJF to focus on a more Americanized structure. The USJA is mostly concentrated in California and Florida, but also popular in the Midwest and Southeast. The United States Judo, Inc. (USJI), doing business as USA Judo, was founded in 1978 and has its headquarters in Colorado Springs, Colorado. It is slightly larger than the USJA and USJF, as they have crossover members from both of these organizations, since they are the designated national governing body of the USOC for the Olympics.

== History ==
President Ulysses S. Grant witnessed a demonstration of jujutsu by judo founder Kanō Jigorō and several others when visiting Japan in 1879. Kano and fellow student Godai Ryusaku performed randori for Grant and his party. In 1889, Kanō Jigorō gave a lecture on the philosophy of judo to several Americans; however, the lecture had little effect on mainstream judo growth. The first American to actually study judo was Prof. Ladd from Yale University, in 1889. He trained at the Kodokan in Japan for about ten years; by 1908 about 13 Americans were training there. In 1919, Prof. John Dewey of Columbia University came to visit Prof. Ladd and Master Kano, many years later he took his knowledge back to Columbia and began the first U.S. college judo program. While some students were training in Japan, there was some action in the U.S.

Perhaps one of the most important figures in the U.S. development of judo is Yamashita Yoshitsugu, who came to the U.S. in 1902 in order to teach judo to the Japanese community. Yoshiaki ended up teaching Senator James Wolcott Wadsworth Jr.'s wife, who happened to attend the same country club as Theodore Roosevelt. Mrs. Wadsworth told Roosevelt about judo, and he became interested in the sport.

Yoshiaki was subsequently invited to Washington to give a demonstration at the White House. There was a contest with a wrestler by the name of John Graft, who was the coach at the U.S. Naval Academy and who was teaching President Roosevelt wrestling. Although Yoshiaki threw him time after time, Graft continued to get up. Finally, Yoshiaki decided that he would do mat work with Graft, since there seemed to be no end to the match. Yoshiaki got an armlock on Graft, but the wrestler would not give up. Yoshiaki kept up the pressure until Graft groaned as his arm came close to breaking. President Roosevelt was impressed and took judo lessons.

Through the help of the president, Yoshiaki taught judo at the naval academy. Judo suddenly had its first strong roots in the United States. Yoshiaki decided to return to Japan, but other Japanese Judo participants followed his example.

During World War II Judo was banned in many areas due to the Japanese fear; however, a boom followed the war. Many servicemen picked up martial arts during the war and returned home to teach them all across the country.

Judo began to develop again in the 1950s when it became required for the US Air Force. After these advances, it was officially recognized as an AAU sport, and there have been national competitions and tournaments ever since. The United States formed an Olympic team and competed in the 1964 Summer Olympics, which it continues to do to this day. Judo is now practiced by an estimated 100,000 American men, women, and children (25,000 registered in either the USJA, USJF and USA Judo).

The official judo federations formed in the 50s and 60s.

== Olympics ==
The United States is not a major power in international Judo competitions. Kayla Harrison is the most successful American Judo Olympian with 2 gold medals, while Jimmy Pedro is the most successful male American Judo Olympian with 2 bronze medals.
