= Jeannine Meulemans =

Belgian judoka

Personal information
- Nationality: Belgian
- Citizenship: Belgium
- Born: 30 March 1951 (age 75) Mechelen, Belgium
- Occupation: Former international judo champion
- Years active: 1974–1983 (competition)
- Weight: 56 kg (123 lb)
- Spouse: Felix De Smedt (1977-2012, deceased)
- Website: www.judo-karatemechelen.be/palmares.html

Sport
- Country: Belgium
- Sport: Judo
- Rank: 6th dan (3rd dan IJF)
- Club: Royal Judo & Karate Academy Bushido-Kwai Mechelen
- Team: Belgium
- Coached by: Felix De Smedt
Medal record
Women's Judo
Representing Belgium
World Championships
Bronze medal – third place	1980 New York	-56 kg
European Championships
Bronze medal – third place	1977 Arlon	-56 kg
- Updated on 29 December 2011

Jeannine Meulemans (born 30 March 1951 in Mechelen) was Belgium's first great international women's judo champion. She is 10-fold Belgian judo champion who nationally remained unbeaten, including in those contests she fought before weight classes were implemented. Internationally, the only contests she lost were due to injury or doubtful referee action. She is considered as the finest female technical judoka ever produced by Belgian judo. Close to her retirement, she won a bronze medal during the first Women's Judo World Championships in 1980 in New York.

== Career ==
Meulemans took up judo in 1966 at age 15 at the Judo and Jujutsu Academy Bushido-Kwai the oldest judo club in Belgium, founded and led by Felix De Smedt (1923–2012) In 1970 she obtained her shodan blackbelt with the Belgian Judo Federation (BJB).

Meulemans' competitive judo career started on 21 January 1973, when the Belgian Judo Federation organized its first women's judo tournament. In April 1974 the first Women's Belgian National Judo Championships were organized, which were still without weight classes. Despite weighing less than 60 kg she dominated the championship with her flawless technique, speed and technical insight ending every match with ippon oftentimes before even one minute was elapsed. This was the first of 10 successive Belgian national titles.

In 1975, the first Women's European Judo Championships were held in Munich. However, shortly before the championship she dislocated her arm during practice with the national team, which prevented her from participating.

In 1976, just prior to the second Women's European championships to be held in Vienna she injured her other arm during the Open British Championships. Although she participated in the European Championships that year, she injured the same arm again during the half-final, when her adversary, German Sigrid Happ applied jūji-gatame. The match ended with equal score, but the referee gave the victory to Happ. Having to go on just one arm at a championship of this level, she was unable to win her match for the bronze medal.

The third Women's European Championships were held in Arlon, Belgium. This time, not suffering from any debilitating injuries she captured the bronze medal after having been unfairly penalized by the referee during her match against the later finalist, the Swedish Rebecca Ljungberg (now Rebecca Limerick), for wearing her belt too low on her hips !

In 1978 she won a gold medal during the Tournament of Paris. That same year she also became a nidan black belt within the Vlaamse Judo Federatie (VJF), the second Flemish regional jūdō federation founded after the mandated 1977 decretal split of the Belgische Judo Bond.

In 1980, the IJF for the first time organized the World Judo Championships for women, which were to be held in New York City in Madison Square Garden. Expectations were that the -56 category would end in a final between Meulemans and here main rival, 5-fold European champion Gerda Winklbauer from Austria. However, during the championship, Meulemans unexpectedly lost a match with kōka against the French Marie-Paule Panza, but won all of her other matches hence securing a bronze medal. Her success was, however, eclipsed by a previously largely unknown junior member of the Belgian team, named Ingrid Berghmans, who surprised everyone by winning gold in the Open category, hence becoming Belgium's first judo world champion ever. For the young Berghmans this was also the start of her rise to glory, and the first of what would eventually amount to six world titles and eleven world championship medals.

In 1982 Meulemans obtained her sandan black belt during what were to be the final joined national rank exams of the Vlaamse Judo Federatie (VJF) and the Ligue Francophone de Judo, acting under the Belgian Judo Federation umbrella. The exams were held in Etterbeek (ESC), Brussels, before a national jury consisting of Jean-Marie Falise, Marcel Clause, Marcel Degroote, and presided by Abe Ichirō, 8th dan from the Kōdōkan in Japan. At that occasion she was praised by Abe Ichirō, for obtaining the highest score among all candidates irrespective of gender.

In 1983 Meulemans retired from competitive judo after winning her 10th successive national title, though at club level she continued to remain for years a technically inspiring judo training partner to Sonja Maes and Carl De Crée, then the club's two other active judo champions.

Meulemans currently holds the rank of 6th dan. In August 2012, following the death of her husband and former coach Felix De Smedt, she took over his role in becoming president of the Royal Judo and Karate Academy Bushido-Kwai Mechelen.

Today, the name of Meulemans and most other Belgian women's judo pioneers has been largely forgotten, and the current judo public is more familiar with the later generation of successful Belgian women's judo champions, such as Ingrid Berghmans (Olympic Champion, 6-fold World Champion, 7-fold European Champion, double Belgian National Champion), Ulla Werbrouck (7-fold European Champion and 7-fold Belgian National Champion), and Gella Vandecaveye (double World Champion, 7-fold European Champion, and 14-fold Belgian National Champion). However, it is, particularly, Meulemans and Marie-France Mill who played a pioneering role in Belgium's international women's judo successes, with Meulemans recognised as the finest female Belgian judo technician to date. Their careers predated the start of Olympic women's judo and only barely overlapped with the very first Women's Judo World Championships.
