= Eichi Karl Koiwai =

American judoka

Eichi Karl Koiwai, M.D. (February 21, 1920 – February 23, 2009) was the president of the United States Judo Federation (USJF) in 1973 and 1974 and the chairman of the United States Olympic Committee in 1973.

== Education ==
Koiwai earned his medical degree from Hanhehamm Medical College, specializing in pathology, in 1947.

== Judo leadership ==
Koiwai was the chairman of the United States Olympic Committee in 1973 and the chairman of the National AAU Judo Committee prior to that. His work contributed to deeper collaboration between the AAU and the USJF. In 1960, he wrote the Official AAU - JBBF Judo Handbook. In 1965, he became the head of the National AAU Judo Committee, replacing Philip S. Porter (who was later a USJA founder). Koiwai commissioned a study on injuries in judo. In 1970, he was listed in Black Belt magazine's hall of fame. He was a referee at the 1976 Montreal Olympics.

For a period, Koiwai was a critic of the United States Judo Association, which he felt did not follow the rules of the federation.

Koiwai died on February 23, 2009. Services were held in Pennsylvania. He was a close friend of judo pioneer Yosh Uchida.
