= Tammy Hostetler =

American judoka

Personal information
- Nickname: Tami Hostetler
- Born: 1957 or 1958 (age 67–68)
- Home town: Rantoul, Illinois, U.S.
- Occupation: Judoka
- Years active: 1973–1978
- Height: 5 ft 1 in (155 cm) (1977)
- Weight: 102 lb (46 kg) (1977)

Sport
- Country: United States
- Sport: Women's Judo
- Weight class: 48kg or less
- Coached by: Bill Horve
Medal record
Pan American Judo Union
Bronze medal – third place	1977 Championships	–110 lbs
U.S. Judo Association
Gold medal – first place	1977 Nationals	–110 lbs
Amateur Athletic Union
Bronze medal – third place	1977 Championships	–110 lbs
Bronze medal – third place	1976 Championships	–110 lbs
British Open Judo
Silver medal – second place	1976 Championships	–48 kg
Gold medal – first place	1975 Championships	–48 kg

Profile at external databases
- JudoInside.com: 20411
- Updated on 17 June 2022

Tammy Hostetler is an American former competitor in the sport of judo. In 1977, she was recognized by Black Belt magazine as one of the Top 10 female judoka in the United States.

== Training ==
Tammy benefited from training under Bill Horve at Decatur DoJo in Decatur, Illinois, which allowed her to train with top level talent of Lisa Alstadt and Vickie Daniels.

== Career ==
In 1975, she earned a gold medal in the U48 women's division at the British Open and the following year she took the silver medal. At the 1976 British Open, Hosteler's record was 5–1 and all of her wins came in the first 49 seconds of the bout. In 1976, she tied with Robin Takemori for a bronze medal at the AAU Women's National Championships in the 110 pound division. In the 1977 U.S. Judo Association Women's Judo Nationals, Tammy was able to earn first place. She earned a bronze medal at the 1977 AAU Senior Women's Championships and another bronze at the first Pan American Judo Union's Women's Championships in the 110 pounds and under division.

In 1976 she was named the female competitor of the year by the U.S. Judo Association. In 1977 she was tenth on the Black Belt '77 Yearbook list of top female judoka, nominated from a survey of top coaches and fellow female fighters. Black Belt also made note of Hostetler's rapid ascent in the sport and that her 1976 recognition for contribution to U.S. Judo was "quite an achievement for a young lady who had been in judo for only three years". She appeared on the cover of American Judo newspaper in May 1977. In international competition, Hostetler had a reputation for refusing to submit when placed in katame-waza holds.

== Personal life ==
Hostetler married in 1977 and moved from Illinois to California.
