= Yoshimi Osawa =

Japanese judoka (1926–2022)

Yoshimi Ōsawa
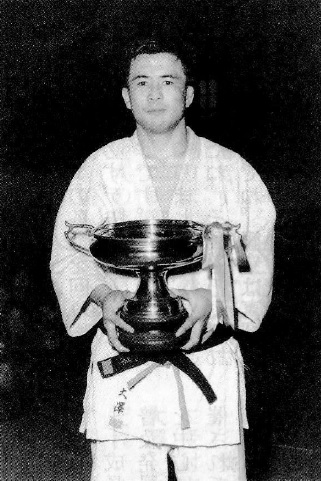
- Ōsawa in 1953

Personal information
- Native name: 大澤慶巳 Ōsawa Yoshimi
- Born: 6 March 1926 Munakata Village, Inba District, Chiba Prefecture, Japan (now part of Inzai City)
- Died: 21 October 2022 (aged 96) Japan
- Occupation: Judoka

Sport
- Sport: Judo
- Rank: 10th dan black belt

Yoshimi Ōsawa (大澤慶巳, Ōsawa Yoshimi; 6 March 1926 – 21 October 2022) was a Japanese judoka. Before his death, he was the only living Kodokan 10th dan (and one of only 15 to have attained this rank), having been promoted at the New Year Kagami Biraki Ceremony, 8 January 2006 along with Toshiro Daigo and Ichiro Abe.

== Biography ==
Ōsawa was born 6 March 1926 in Munakata Village, Inba District, Chiba Prefecture, Japan (now part of Inzai City). He was educated at Waseda University and later became a judo instructor there. Osawa weighed in at 145 lbs. but competed against all sizes. Although at times he went as big as 5' 6", 160 lbs. He was highly regarded as a Judo technician, particularly for his ashi-waza and, although a lightweight, was considered a favourite to win the All-Japan Judo Championships and defeated the 1948 champion Yasuichi Matsumoto to win the Fukuoka tournament in November 1948. After he retired, he made a trip to Brazil. He was challenged by Helio Gracie, who had previously been defeated by Kimura. As a coach, he was forced to decline the match. Osawa was a primary author of the book Kodokan Judo: A Guide to Proficiency. Osawa was the head instructor at Waseda University. Osawa was considered to be one of the top technicians in Judo post World War II.

Ōsawa died from pneumonia on 21 October 2022, at the age of 96.
