= Koiwai =

Koiwai (written: 小岩井 lit "small rock well") is a Japanese surname. Notable people with the surname include:

- Eichi Karl Koiwai (1920–2009), American judoka
- Kotori Koiwai (小岩井 ことり; born 1990), Japanese voice actress
- Kumiko Koiwai (小岩井 久美子; born 1975), Japanese figure skater
- Sakura Koiwai (小祝さくら, born 1998), Japanese golfer

== Fictional characters ==
- Yotsuba Koiwai (小岩井 四葉), titular character of the manga series Yotsuba&!
- Yoshino Koiwai, character from Masamune-kun's No Revenge series

== See also ==
- Koiwai Station, a railway station in Takizawa, Iwate Prefecture, Japan
- Kowiai language, also spelled Koiwai
