= Toshirō Daigo =

Japanese judoka (1926–2021)

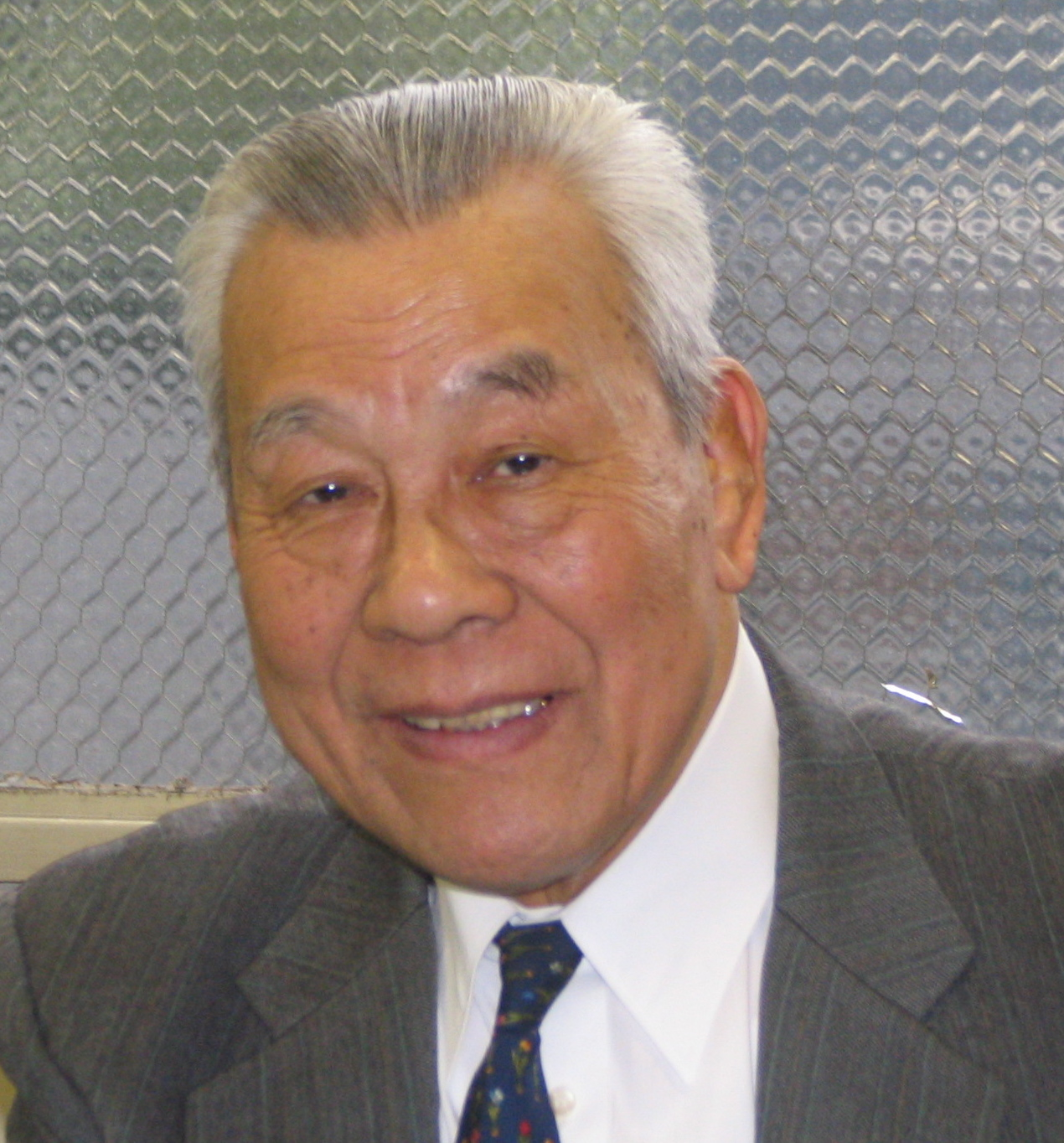
- Toshirō Daigo

Personal information
- Native name: 醍醐敏郎 Daigo Toshirō
- Born: 2 January 1926 Awa District, Chiba, Japan
- Died: 10 October 2021 (aged 95) Tokyo, Japan
- Occupation: Judoka

Sport
- Sport: Judo
- Rank: 10th dan black belt

Toshirō Daigo (醍醐敏郎, Daigo Toshirō; 2 January 1926 – 10 October 2021) was a Japanese judoka who was the Chief Instructor at the Kodokan and a manager of the Japanese national team.

Before his death, he was one of only three living Kodokan 10th dan (and one of only 15 to have attained this rank), having been promoted at the New Year Kagami biraki Ceremony, 8 January 2006, along with Ichiro Abe and Yoshimi Osawa.

== Biography ==
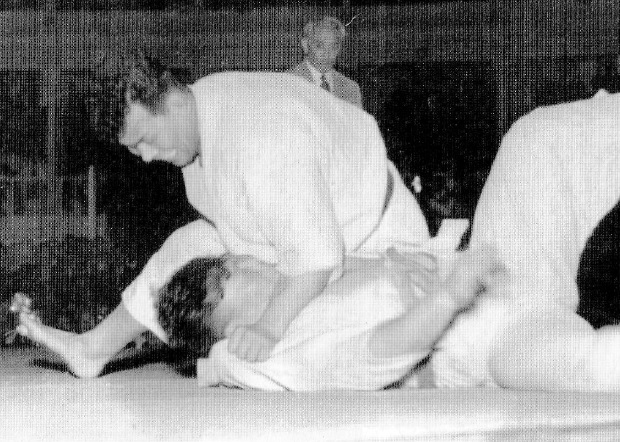
Toshirō Daigo in the final of the 1951 All-Japan Judo Championships

Daigo was born in January 1926 and educated at Tokyo University of Education.

He was All-Japan Judo Champion in 1951 and 1954, and the author of Kodokan Judo: Throwing Techniques, a definitive text on judo throws.

Daigo died on 10 October 2021, at the age of 95.

== Bibliography ==
- (2005) Kodokan Judo: Throwing Techniques, Kodansha, Tokyo, Japan.
