= Edward Szrejter =

American judoka executive (1927–2020)

Personal information
- Born: 16 December 1927
- Died: 28 April 2020 (aged 92)
- Occupation: Judoka

Sport
- Sport: Judo
- Rank: 9th dan black belt

Edward N. Szrejter (1927-2020) was a former Executive Director of the United States Judo Association. He is notable as the creator of the Judo Kata of Renraku-no-kata, which translates to Forms of Combination.

== Clubs ==
Edward Szrejter was the point of contact for the Danang Judo Club. He later ran a club in Florida that had upwards of 230 members.
