= Yasuhiko Nagatoshi =

American judoka (born 1942)

Personal information
- Born: 10 April 1942 (age 83)
- Occupation: Judoka

Sport
- Sport: Judo
- Rank: 7th dan black belt

Profile at external databases
- JudoInside.com: 48223

Yasuhiko Nagatoshi (born 10 April 1942) is an American judoka practitioner. In the 1967 US National Championships, Nagatoshi won grand champion and the gold medal in the under 80 kg division. He was a bronze medalist in the 1968 National Championships.

Nagatoshi first came to America via an exchange program to Norwalk. He holds the rank of 7th dan. Nagatoshi was the Olympic alternate for Japan.
