= Henry Stone (judoka) =

Henry A. Stone, Ph.D. (1901–1956) was an American judoka and physical education supervisor at the University of California at Berkeley.

== Career ==
Stone was the Associate Supervisor, then Supervisor for Physical Education for Men at the University of California at Berkeley from the late 1940s until the 1955–1956 academic year. Stone held a 5th degree black belt in Judo, and was instrumental in the early formation of national governance for Judo in the United States, and with Yosh Uchida helped to establish weight categories in contest Judo. He has been called the "Father of American Judo", and was inducted into the United States Judo Federation Hall of Fame in 1993.
