= Karl Geis =

American Judoka (1933-2014)

- Born: April 7, 1933; Houston, Texas
- Died: 2014 (aged 80–81)
- Style: Judo, Aikido
- Rank: 10th Dan Judo; 7th Dan in Aikido

Karl Geis (1933 – April 7, 2014) was an American judo, aikido, and jodo instructor. He died of prostate cancer. Karl Geis is a member of the Black Belt Magazine Hall of Fame, and the founder of Fugakukai International Association.

== Martial arts ==
Geis was first exposed to Judo in 1955 while as a member of the US Air Force. Karl Geis would train at the Kodokan. Geis would be promoted to 4th dan in judo at the Kodokan in 1967 at the age of 34 and to 6th dan in aikido by Kenji Tomiki in 1979. Karl Geis would win the Black Belt Magazine Judo Competitor of the Year for 1974 Geis was a founding member of the USJF Texas Yudanshakai. Geis along with George Harris, Robey Reed, Philip S. Porter, and a few others were the founders of the United States Judo Association. which promoted him to 10th dan on March 12, 2014. Karl was a leading light in Judo for 20 year prior to 1974. One of Karl Geis' more prominent students was two time Olympian Jimmy Wooley

== Psychology ==
Geis worked as a psychologist and a developer as the positive reinforcement method of training in martial arts. He would be the subject of multiple independent articles including one concerning his use of psychology in Judo in black belt magazine.

== Fugakukai International Association ==
Geis founded Fugakukai Aikido and was eventually promoted to 10th dan by the board of instructors of Fugakukai. Geis lists as primary influences, his Japanese aikido, judo, and jodo instructors; Kenji Tomiki, Tsunako Miyake, Yoshimi Osawa, Sumiyuki Kotani, Toshiro Daigo, Kazuo Kudo, and Tatsukuma Ushijima.

== Media ==
Geis is the author of "The Book of Twelve Winds."
