= Kagami mochi =

Traditional Japanese New Year decoration

Kagami mochi (鏡餅, "mirror rice cake") is a traditional Japanese New Year decoration. It usually consists of two round mochi (rice cakes), the smaller placed atop the larger, and a daidai (a Japanese bitter orange) with an attached leaf on top. In addition, it may have a sheet of konbu and a skewer of dried persimmons under the mochi. It sits on a stand called a sanpō (三宝) over a sheet called a shihōbeni (四方紅), which is supposed to ward off fires from the house for the following years. Sheets of paper called gohei (御幣) folded into lightning shapes similar to those seen on sumo wrestler's belts are also attached.

Mass-produced kagami mochi rice cakes	A traditionally-ornamented kagami mochi

Several sizes and prices of kagami mochi in Tokyo.	Traditionally-made kagami mochi

Kagami mochi first appeared in the Muromachi period (14th-16th century). The name kagami ("mirror") is said to have originated from its resemblance to an old-fashioned kind of round copper or bronze mirror, which also had a religious significance. The reason for it is not clear. Explanations include mochi being a food for special days, the spirit of the rice plant being found in the mochi, and the mochi being a food which gives strength.

The two mochi discs are variously said to symbolize the going and coming years, the human heart, "yin" and "yang", or the Moon and the Sun. The daidai, whose name means "generations", is said to symbolize the continuation of a family from generation to generation.

Traditionally, kagami mochi were placed in various locations throughout the house. Nowadays, they are usually placed in a household Shinto altar, or kamidana. They are also placed in the tokonoma, a small decorated alcove in the main room of the home.

Contemporary kagami mochi are often pre-molded into the shape of stacked disks and sold in plastic packages in the supermarket. A mikan or a plastic imitation daidai is often substituted for the original one.

Variations in the shape of kagami mochi are also seen. In some regions, three layered kagami mochi are also used. The three layered kagami mochi are placed on the butsudan or on the kamidana. There is also a variant decoration called an okudokazari placed in the center of the kitchen or by the window which has three layers of mochi.

Kagami mochi are traditionally broken and eaten in a Shinto ritual called kagami biraki (mirror-opening) on the second Saturday or Sunday of January. This is an important ritual in Japanese martial arts dojos. It was first adopted into Japanese martial arts when Kanō Jigorō, the founder of judo, adopted it in 1884, and since then the practice has spread to aikido, karate, and jujutsu dojos.

== See also ==
- Noshi
- Daphniphyllum
