= Jesse Jones (judoka) =

American soldier

Jesse Lee Jones
Personal information
- Born: November 13, 1936
- Died: July 14, 2014 (aged 77)
- Occupation: Judoka

Sport
- Sport: Judo
- Rank: 9th dan black belt

Jesse Jones was born on November 13, 1936, in Big Sandy, Texas. He died on July 14, 2014. He was the son of Hattie Chalk and Truman Jones.

== Military ==
Jones was a former member of the United States Marine Corps. He served from 1952 to 1973, having served in the Korean and Vietnam Wars. He earned two Purple Hearts during his tenure.

== Judo ==
Jones learned Judo while a member of the US Marines. He went on to teach Judo for over 55 years. During this time, he implemented a number of Judo programs in the San Diego Area as well as Southwestern College. He organized a number of tournaments at Southwestern College. Jones served as the Southwest Judo Association Yudankashi's first vice president. Jones was also a President of the United States Judo Association. It was during this tenure that he brought the organization back from almost closing due to bankruptcy. He won the United States Judo Association's Coach of the Year Award in 2013. He served as a technical advisor during the US Olympics in Los Angeles in 1984 and Atlanta in 1996. Jones also earned the United States Judo Associations USJA Lifetime Achievement Award.

== Personal life ==
Jones married Joan Seidel and had two children, Andrea Lee and Nicole Suzanne. Jones earned his MBA from San Diego State.
