= Schelle =

- Municipality
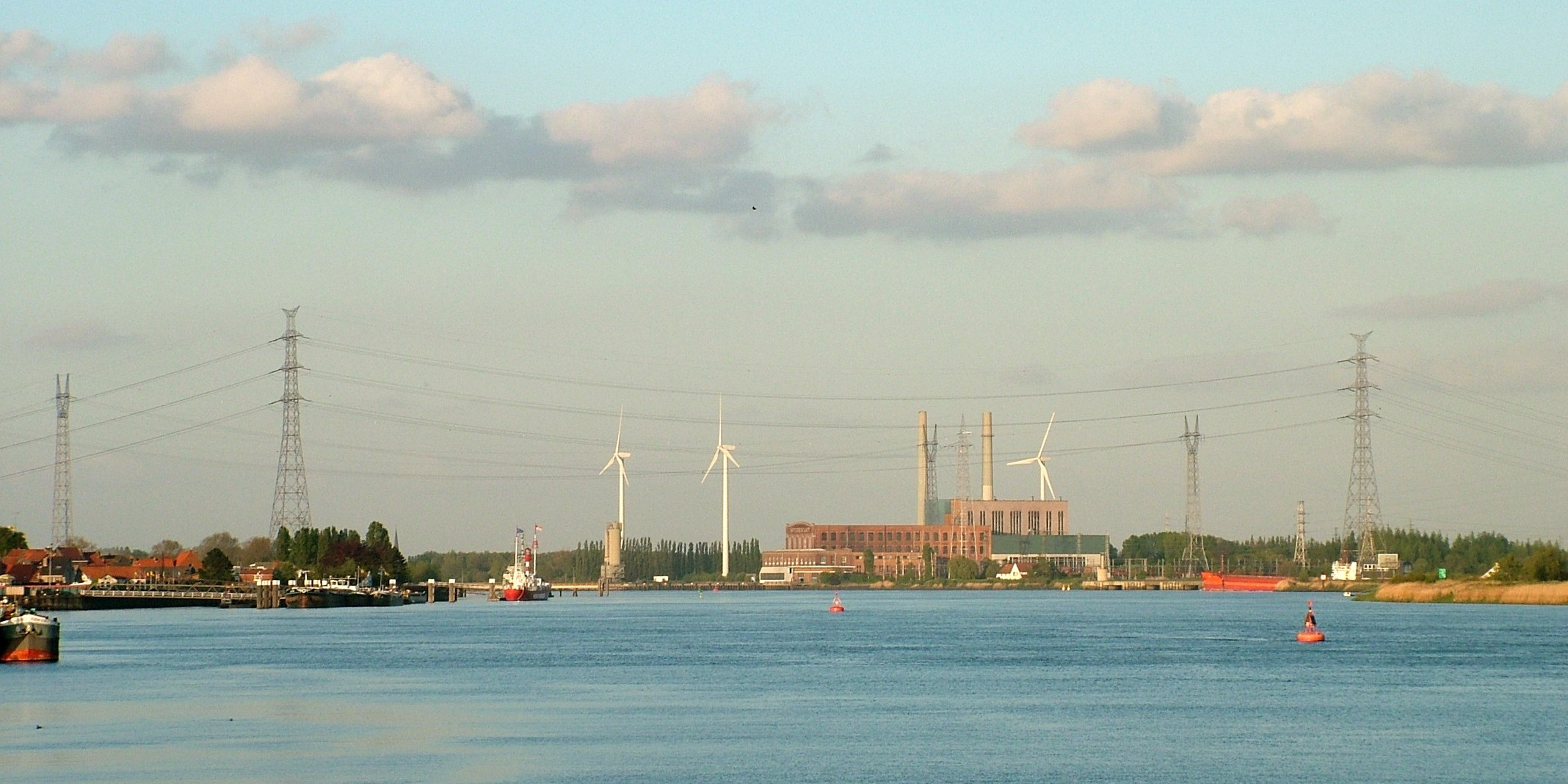

- Flag Coat of arms

- Location of Schelle in the province of Antwerp
- Interactive map of Schelle
- Location in Belgium
- Coordinates: 51°08′N 04°20′E
- Country: Belgium
- Community: Flemish Community
- Region: Flemish Region
- Province: Antwerp
- Arrondissement: Antwerp

Government
  - Mayor: Rob Mennes (CD&V)
  - Governing party: CD&V

Area
  - Total: 7.83 km^{2} (3.02 sq mi)

Population (2025-01-01)
  - Total: 8,682
  - Density: 1,110/km^{2} (2,870/sq mi)
- Postal codes: 2627
- NIS code: 11038
- Area codes: 03
- Website: www.schelle.be

Schelle is also the German name for Šaľa, Slovakia.

Schelle (Dutch pronunciation: [ˈsxɛlə]) is a municipality located in the Belgian province of Antwerp. The municipality only comprises the town of Schelle proper. In 2021, Schelle had a total population of 8,559. The total area is 7.80 km^{2}.

== Notable people ==
- Hugo Coveliers (born 1947), retired Belgian politician and lawyer
- Felix De Smedt (1923–2012), judoka who is credited with introducing the sport to Belgium.

== Gallery ==
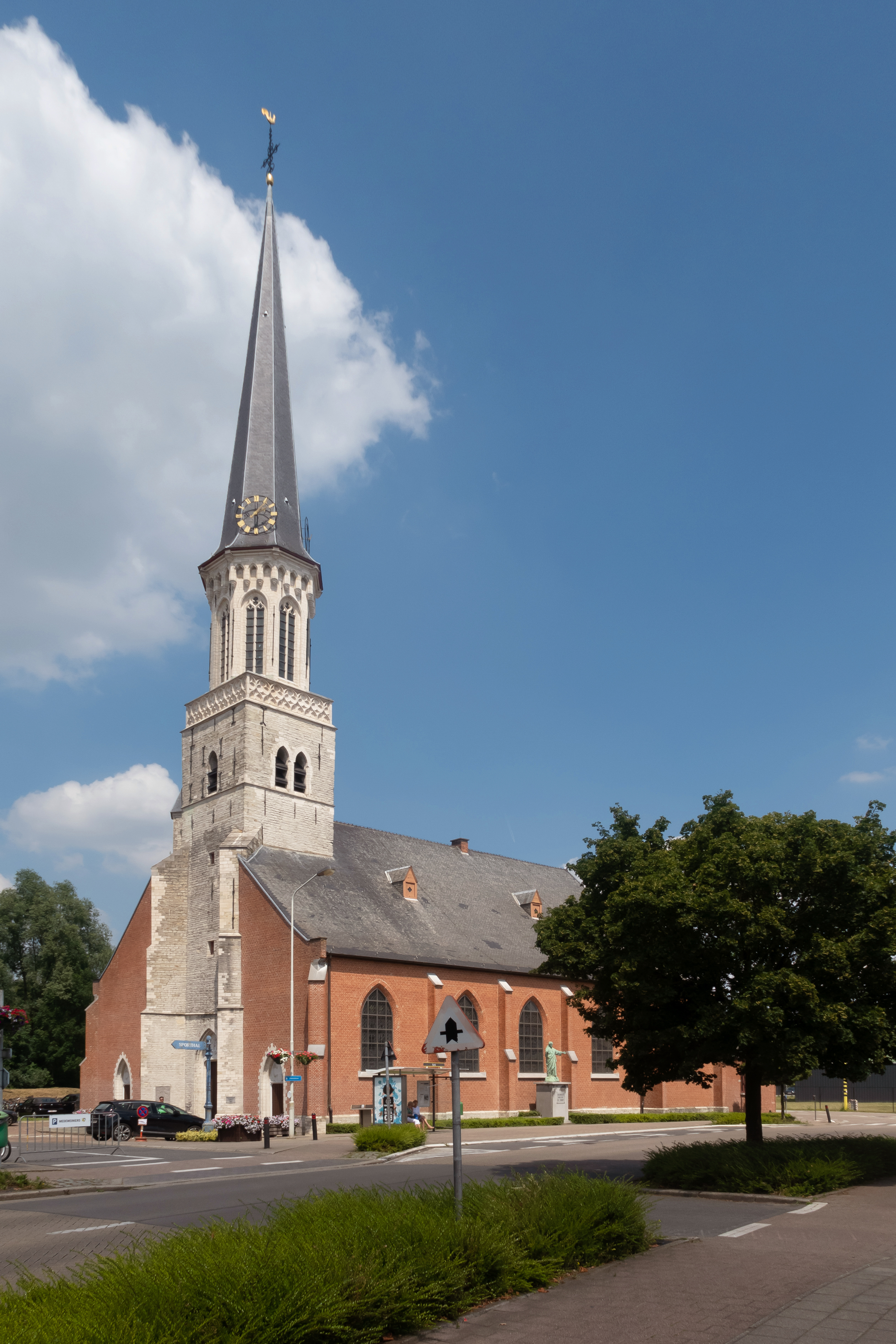
Schelle, church: parochiekerk Sint-Petrus en Paulus

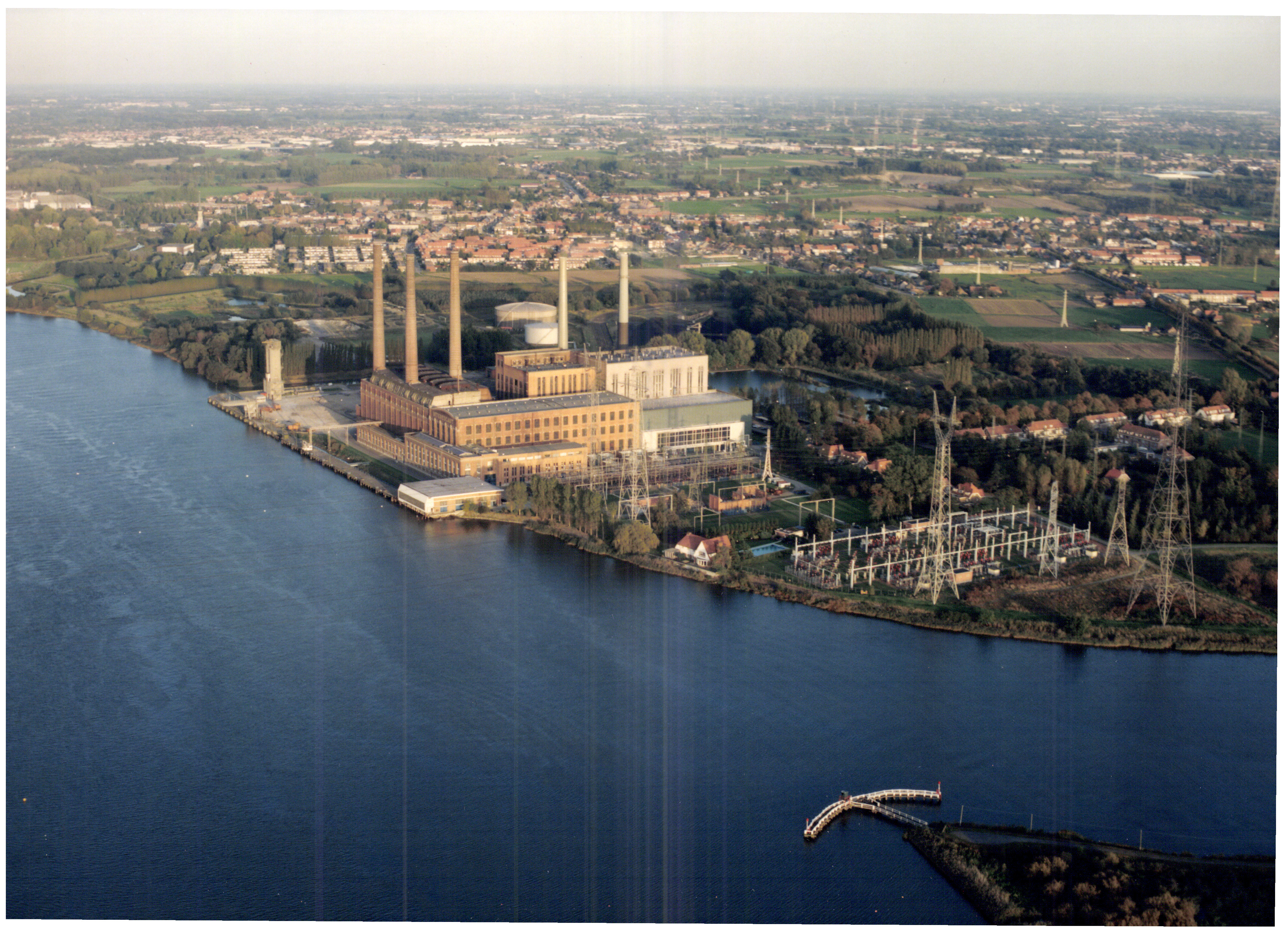
Power plant

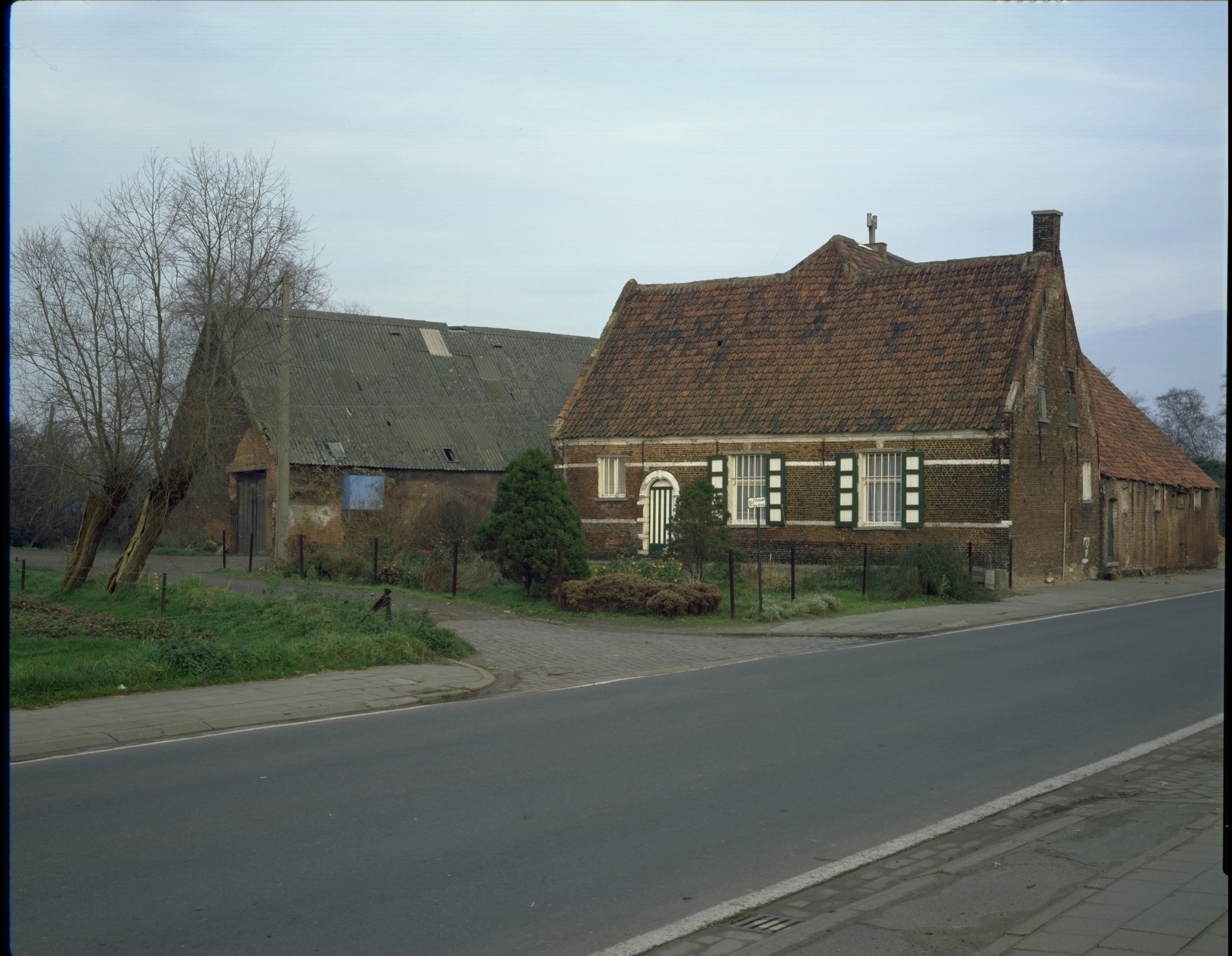
Farm in Schelle

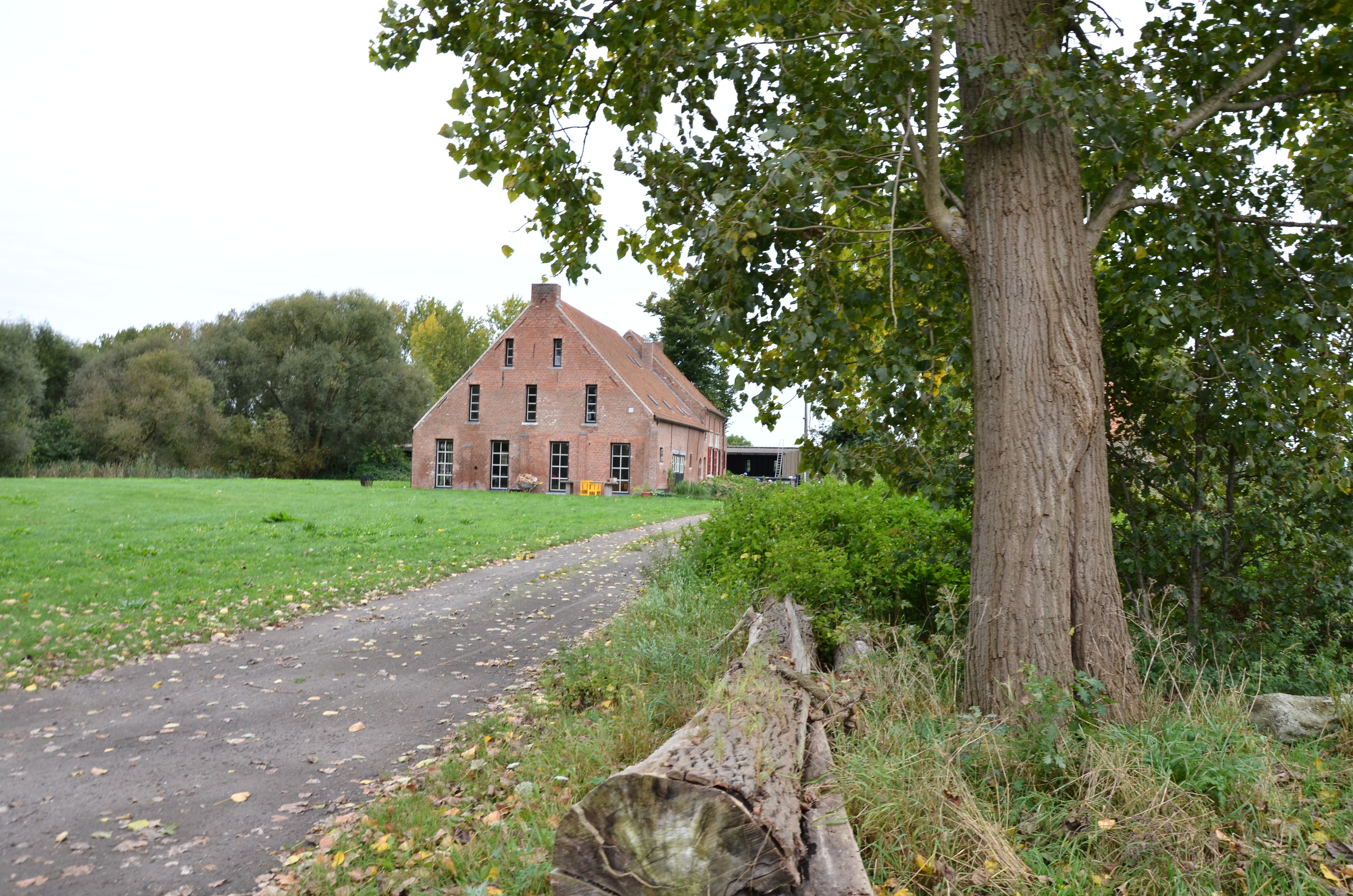
Farm in Schelle
