= Kokushikan University =

Private university in Setagaya, Japan

Coordinates: 35°38′54.72″N 139°39′25.03″E

- 国士舘大学
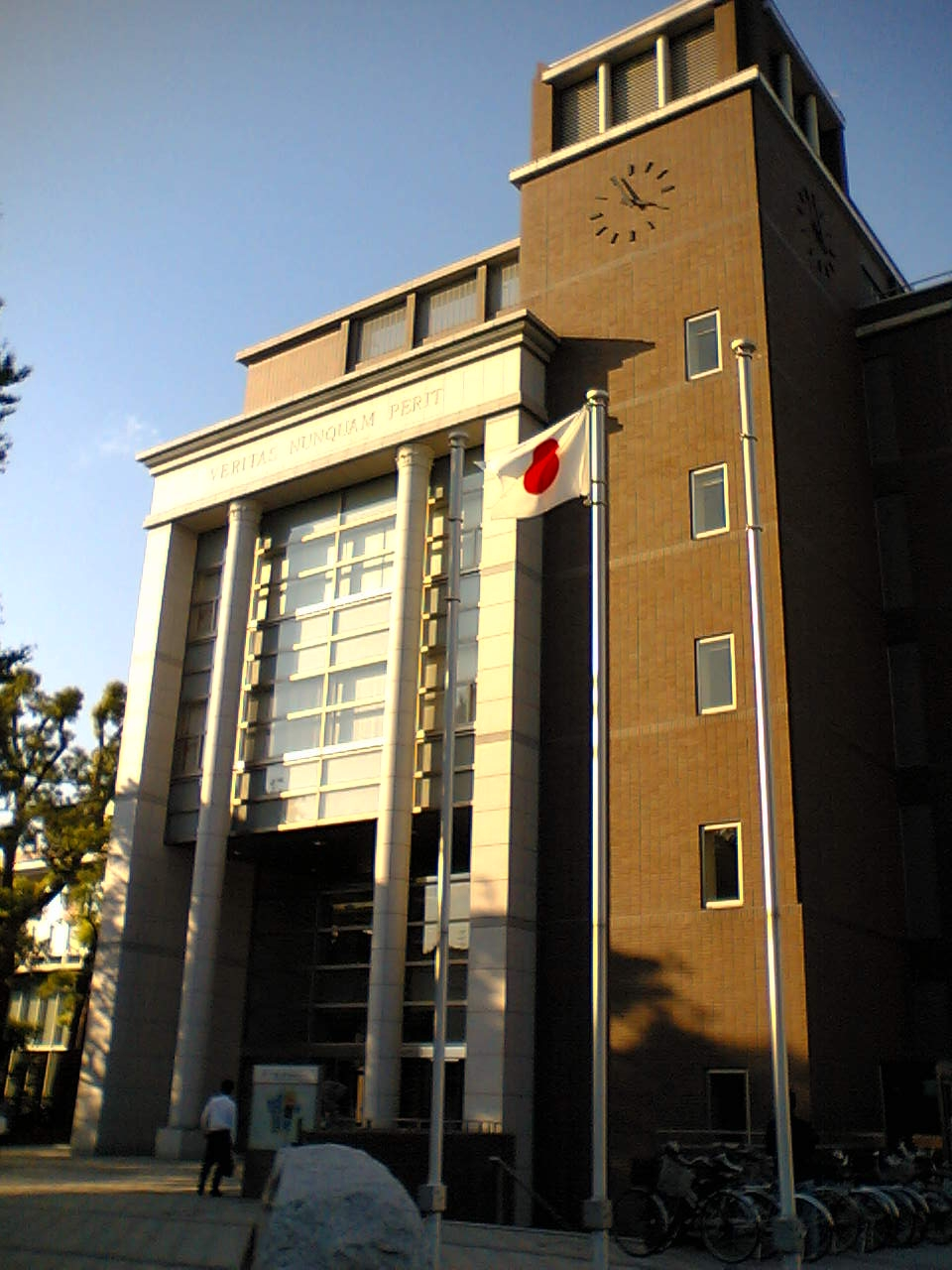
- Motto: Knowledge and Action
- Type: Private
- Established: 1917
- Affiliations: Setagaya Six Universities Consortium
- President: Nobuyuki Miura, Ph.D.
- Location: Setagaya, Tokyo, Japan
- Campus: Urban
- Website: www.kokushikan.ac.jp

Kokushikan University (国士舘大学, Kokushikan Daigaku) is a private university in Setagaya, Tokyo, Japan.

The basic origins of Kokushikan University lie in the Kokushikan private academy which was founded in Tokyo's Azabu District in 1917, during the Taisho period. Kokushikan's 146,000 graduates are active in all spheres of society.

== Organization ==
=== Graduate schools ===
- Political Science
- Economics
- Business Administration
- Sport System
- Emergency Medical System
- Engineering
- Law
- Interdisciplinary Intellectual Property Law
- Human Sciences
- Globalising Asia

=== Undergraduate faculties ===
- Faculty of Political Science and Economics
  - Political Science and Public Administration
  - Economics
- Faculty of Physical Education
  - Sport and Physical Education
  - Martial Arts
  - Sport and Medical Science
- School of Science and Engineering
  - Mechanical Engineering
  - Electronics and Informatics
  - Civil Engineering
  - Urban Design
  - Human Informatics
  - Mathematics and Science
- Faculty of Law
  - Law
  - Modern Business Law
- Faculty of Letters
  - Education
  - History and Geography
  - Literature
- School of Asia 21
- Faculty of Business

=== Research institutes ===
- Research Institutes and Centers
- International Center
- Asia-Japan Research Center
- Institute of Budo and Moral Education
- Lifelong Learning Center
- Wellness Research Center
- Institute for Cultural Studies of Ancient Iraq
- Institute for the Study of Politics
- Placement Center

=== Others ===
- University Library
- Guesthouse
- Student dormitory
- Kokushikan Foreign Student Alumni Meeting
- Cultural Exchange Center with Loval Citizen

=== Scholarship ===
- Studies excellent scholarship
- Athletic skills excellent scholarship
- Study help scholarship
- Students from abroad scholarship
- Department of Engineering Shiozawa scholarship
- Rinichi Kitsutaka Commemoration study fund (only for students of the Department of Letters from Chiba Prefecture)
- Muneo Nakamura Study fund (only for students of the School of Law)

=== Campus ===
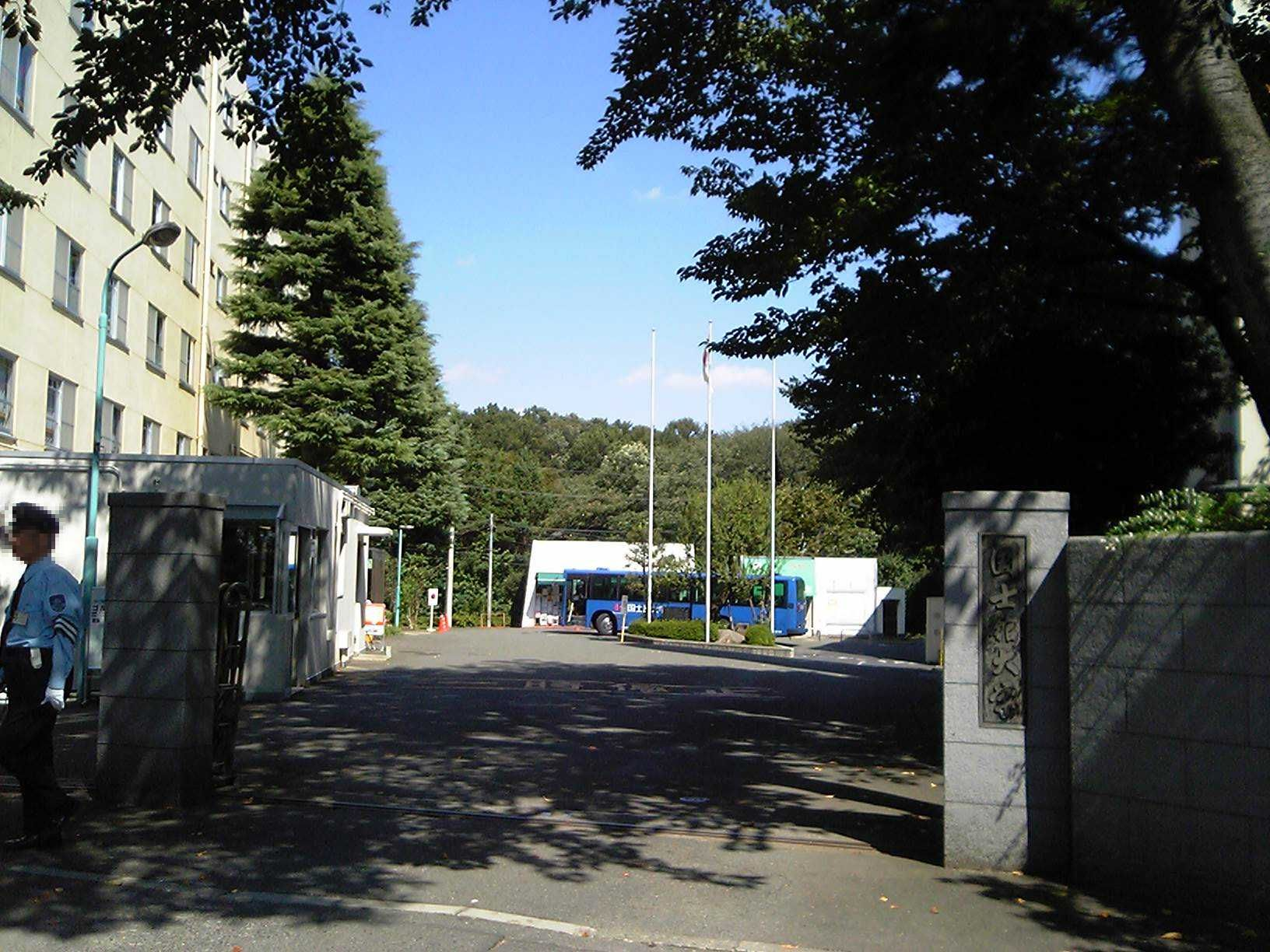
Machida Campus

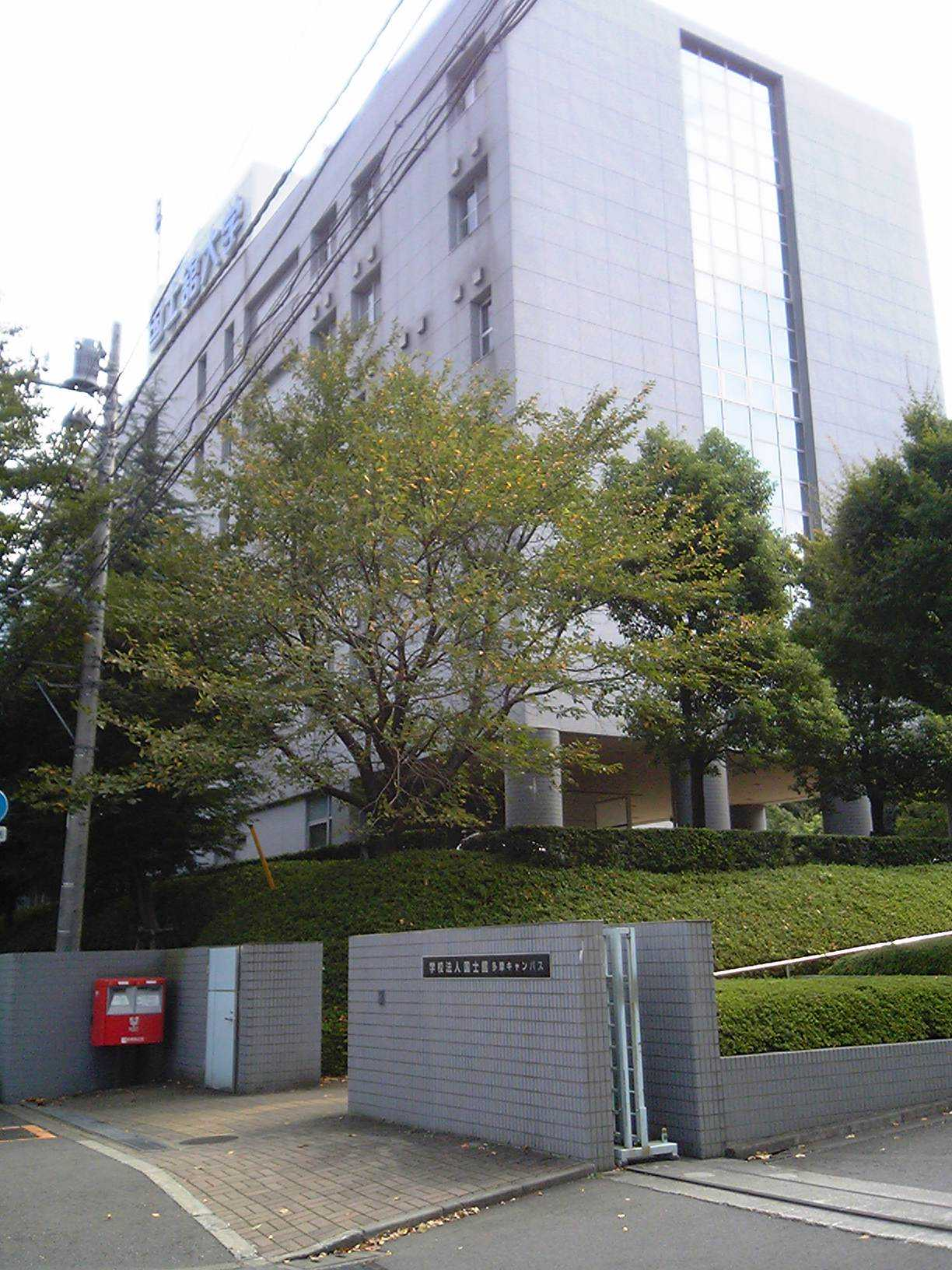
Tama Campus

- Setagaya Campus: (Main campus) 4-28-1 Setagaya, Setagaya, Tokyo 154–8515, Japan
- Machida Campus: Hirohakama, Machida, Tokyo, Japan 195-8550
- Tama Campus: Nagayama, Tama, Tokyo, Japan 206-8515
- Setagaya-Umegaoka Campus: 1223-1 Umegaoka, Setagaya, Tokyo, Japan

== External relations ==
=== Setagaya Six Universities Consortium ===
In addition to Kokushikan University, the other participants in the Setagaya Six Universities Consortium (世田谷6大学コンソーシアム Setagaya Roku Daigaku Konsōshiamu) are as follows:

- Komazawa University
- Seijo University
- Showa Women's University
- Tokyo University of Agriculture
- Musashi Institute of Technology

=== Metropolitan west-area university credit transfer ===
Kokushikan University is in a credit transfer agreement with the following area schools:

- Azabu University
- Sagami Women's University
- Kitasato University
- Joshibi University of Art and Design
- Obirin University
- Tamagawa University
- Tokyo Jogakkan College
- Kanagawa Institute of Technology
- Shoin University
- Tokyo University of Agriculture
- Showa University of Music
- Tokyo Polytechnic University
- Sanno University
- Den-en Chofu University
- Kokugakuin University
- Toyo Eiwa University
- Kamakura Women's University
- Takachiho University

== Sister schools ==
=== Asia ===
China
- Beijing Normal University
- Beijing University of Technology
- Shanxi University
- Soochow University
- Heilongjiang University
- Shanghai Institute of Foreign Trade
- Wuhan University
- Jilin University
- Dalian University of Foreign Languages
- Neusoft Institute of Information

Indonesia
- Gadjah Mada University
- Sebelas Maret University

Kazakhstan
- Al-Farabi Kazakh National University

Kyrgyzstan
- Kyrgyz National University

Mongolia
- National University of Mongolia

Myanmar
- University of Yangon

Philippines
- De La Salle University

South Korea
- Hanyang University
- Chonnam National University
- Dong-Eui University
- Andong National University
- Korea University

Taiwan
- Chinese Culture University
- National Sun Yat-sen University

Thailand
- Chulalongkorn University
- Chiang Mai University

Vietnam
- Ho Chi Minh City University of Social Sciences and Humanities

=== North America ===
Canada
- Simon Fraser University (one month language training program only)
- College of the Rockies (one month language training program only)

United States
- St. John's University
- San Francisco State University
- University of California, Davis (one month language training program only)

=== Europe ===
Bulgaria
- National Sports Academy
- Veliko Tarnovo University

Germany
- LMU Munich

Hungary
- Semmelweis University

Russia
- Far Eastern Federal University

== Research Institute ==
Iraq

- The Iraqi State Board of Antiquities and Heritage

== Alumni ==
- Chubee Kagita, Diet member (Liberal Democratic Party)
- Hitoshi Saito, Olympic gold medal (judoka)
- Keiji Suzuki, Olympic gold medal (judoka)
- Masato Uchishiba, Olympic gold medal (judoka)
- Satoshi Ishii, Olympic gold medal (judoka)
- Rika Usami, karateka
- Sadaki Nakabayashi, once the highest ranking Judoka in the United States
- Harumi Hiroyama, long-distance runner
- Tetsuji Hashiratani, football player
- Hiroto Taniguchi, football player
- Michiyoshi Ohara, professional wrestler
- Naofumi Yamamoto, professional wrestler
- Passion Yara, comedian
- Miyata Toshiya, member of Kis-My-Ft2
- Megumi Fujii, mixed martial artist

== Affiliated schools ==
- Kokushikan Junior and Senior High School
- Welfare Professional School of Kokushikan University
