= Jessica Jones (disambiguation) =

Jessica Jones is a Marvel Comics character.

Jessica Jones may also refer to:

== Fiction ==
- Jessica Jones (comic book), comic book series
- Jessica Jones (TV series), a television series based on the Marvel character
  - Jessica Jones season 1
  - Jessica Jones season 2
  - Jessica Jones season 3
  - Jessica Jones (Marvel Cinematic Universe), the Marvel Cinematic Universe version of the character
- Jessica Jones (EastEnders), character in EastEnders

== People ==
- Jess Jones (born 1990), Canadian women's ice hockey player
- Jessica Jones (composer), composer for film and TV, including 2026 series Unfamiliar
- Jessica Leigh Jones (born 1994), Welsh engineer and astrophysicist

== See also ==
- Jesse Jones (disambiguation)
