= USS Henry County (LST-824) =

1944 LST-542-class tank landing ship

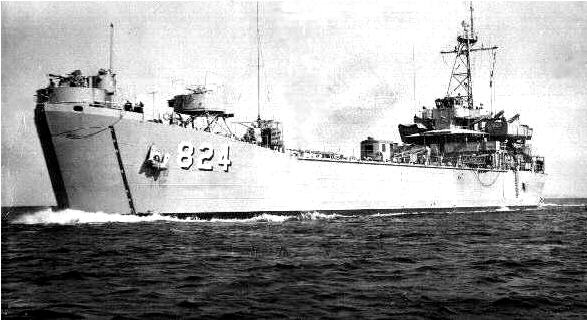
- Henry County underway

History

United States
- Name: USS LST-824
- Namesake: Henry County, Alabama; Henry County, Georgia; Henry County, Illinois; Henry County, Indiana; Henry County, Iowa; Henry County, Kentucky; Henry County, Ohio; Henry County, Tennessee; Henry County, Virginia
- Builder: Missouri Valley Bridge & Iron Company, Evansville, Indiana
- Laid down: 28 September 1944
- Launched: 8 November 1944
- Commissioned: 30 November 1944
- Decommissioned: 15 May 1946
- Renamed: USS Henry County (LST-824), 1 July 1955
- Recommissioned: 5 September 1959
- Stricken: 11 April 1975
- Honors and awards: 1 battle star (World War II); 4 campaign stars (Vietnam)
- Fate: Transferred to Malaysia, 1 October 1976

Malaysia
- Name: KD Sri Banggi
- Acquired: 1 October 1976
- Decommissioned: 1999
- Identification: A-1501
- Fate: Unknown
- Badge

General characteristics
- Class & type: LST-542-class tank landing ship
- Displacement: 1,625 long tons (1,651 t) light; 3,640 long tons (3,698 t) full
- Length: 328 ft (100 m)
- Beam: 50 ft (15 m)
- Draft: Unloaded : 2 ft 4 in (0.71 m) forward; 7 ft 6 in (2.29 m) aft; Loaded : 8 ft 2 in (2.49 m) forward; 14 ft 1 in (4.29 m) aft
- Propulsion: 2 × General Motors 12-567 diesel engines, two shafts, twin rudders
- Speed: 12 knots (22 km/h; 14 mph)
- Boats & landing craft carried: Two LCVPs
- Troops: Approximately 130 officers and enlisted men
- Complement: 8–10 officers, 89–100 enlisted men
- Armament: 1 × single 3-inch/50-caliber gun; 8 × 40 mm guns; 12 × 20 mm guns

USS Henry County (LST-824) was an LST-542-class tank landing ship built for the United States Navy during World War II. Named for counties in Alabama, Georgia, Illinois, Indiana, Iowa, Kentucky, Ohio, Tennessee, and Virginia.

Originally laid down as LST-824 by the Missouri Valley Bridge & Iron Company of Evansville, Indiana on 28 September 1944; launched on 8 November; sponsored by Mrs. Harry W. Groot; and commissioned on 30 November.

== Service history ==
=== World War II, 1945–1946 ===
After shakedown off Florida, LST-824 departed New Orleans on 4 January 1945 for San Diego, arriving there on the 24th. She embarked 107 "bluejackets," then sailed for Pearl Harbor on 26 January. During February she performed training exercises out of Hawaii, then loaded troops and equipment to depart Pearl Harbor on 12 March. For the next month she steamed through the Pacific, stopping at Eniwetok, Guam, and Saipan before proceeding to Okinawa. American forces were already engaged in the fierce struggle to wrestle Okinawa from enemy control when LST-824 departed Saipan on 12 April. Five days later she arrived off China Wan and commenced discharging troops and equipment on the embattled island. The landing ship returned to Saipan on 27 April for reinforcement troops and cargo, and again steamed for Okinawa. For the remainder of World War II, she shuttled supplies between Okinawa and the Philippines in preparation for a possible invasion of Japan. After the Japanese surrender, LST-824 operated with occupation forces in the Far East until sailing for the United States in November. Arriving Portland, Oregon on 5 December, she decommissioned there 15 May 1946 and joined the Pacific Reserve Fleet. While berthed with the Columbia River Group, LST-824 was renamed USS Henry County (LST-824) on 1 July 1955.

=== 1959–1975 ===
Henry County recommissioned on 5 September 1959. After refresher training, Henry County departed the West Coast on 19 March 1960 for the Far East, arriving Yokosuka two weeks later. During the next four months she transported supplies, performed training exercises with U.S. Marines, and engaged in joint operations with Korean forces before returning to Long Beach on 19 August. Following 20 months of operations along the West Coast, Henry County sailed for the mid-Pacific in April 1962 then performed transport and amphibious duties out of Hawaii. In September she was assigned to Task Force 8 for the nuclear tests in "Operation Dominic." Since the tests were considered vital to the nation's security, the Navy demonstrated her ability once again to keep pace with the advances of technology developed to maintain peace through strength. From December 1962 through December 1964 Henry County performed amphibious training operations off the California coast. Decommissioned (date unknown), the ship was struck from the Naval Vessel Register on 11 April 1975. Subsequently transferred to Malaysia and renamed Sri Banggi (A 1501), her final fate is unknown.

LST-824 received one battle star for World War II service and four battle stars for Vietnam service.
