= Yoshihiro Uchida =

American judo coach and businessman (1920–2024)

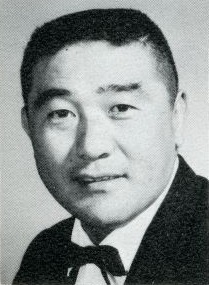
- 1964 San Jose State yearbook photo
- Born: April 1, 1920; Imperial Valley, California, U.S.
- Died: June 27, 2024 (aged 104); Saratoga, California, U.S.
- Alma mater: San Jose State University
- Occupations: Judo coach; businessman; educator

Yoshihiro Uchida (April 1, 1920 – June 27, 2024) was an American judo coach, businessman, and educator who was best known for his contributions to judo. Uchida had been the head judo coach at San Jose State University for over 70 years, and had played a leading part in the development of the university's judo program. His brother George Uchida was the 1972 US Olympic judo coach. He turned 100 in April 2020, and died on June 27, 2024, at the age of 104.

== Early life ==
Uchida was born in Calexico, California, to Japanese immigrants who worked as farm laborers. Later growing up in Garden Grove, Uchida began competing in judo at age 10.

Uchida studied biology at San Jose State College (now University), and in 1940 was made the student-coach of the Physical Education Department's judo program. During World War II, while members of his family were sent to internment camps, Uchida was drafted into the United States Army during World War II and served as a medical technician. He returned to San Jose State in 1946 to complete his degree and to restart the judo program.

== Judo career ==
After graduating in 1947, Uchida remained the coach at SJSU, a part-time position, while working as a laboratory technician at O'Connor Hospital and then a lab supervisor at San Jose Hospital. During this time, Uchida and University of California, Berkeley judo coach Henry Stone began developing rules to allow their students to compete against each other, including a weight class system, moving judo away from a martial art for self defense to a sport for competition. Stone and Uchida persuaded the Amateur Athletic Union (AAU) to sanction judo in 1953; the first AAU National Championship in judo was held at San Jose State in that year.

From 1960 to 1961, Uchida served as president of the Judo Black Belt Federation of America, which under his leadership started a pilot program for a national ranking system. With United States Air Force Academy (USAFA) judo coach Phil Porter, Uchida co-organized the first National Collegiate Judo Championship in 1962 at USAFA. Uchida's San Jose State Spartans won the first of their over 40 national championships under his leadership at the inaugural tournament.

Uchida represented the United States as the team coach of the first Olympic Judo Tournament at the 1964 Summer Olympics in Tokyo. The team included two of Uchida's students from San Jose State, Ben Nighthorse Campbell and Paul Maruyama. James Bregman won a bronze medal in the middleweight class, becoming the first American to medal in the sport.

Uchida continued promoting the sport after the 1964 Olympics. He organized the first U.S. High School Judo Championships and the first U.S. Open tournament, both hosted at San Jose State. As of 2012, his San Jose State Spartans judo teams have won 45 of the 51 National Collegiate Judo Championships. In February 2007, the San Jose State program was named one of six USA Judo National Training Sites.

== Business career ==
In 1957, Uchida bought and operated a failing medical laboratory in order to earn enough income to qualify for a home loan. Having bought the lab for $3,000 with a $75 down payment, Uchida made the lab profitable within one month by soliciting business from doctors with whom he worked previously. Uchida's laboratory business grew to 40 locations.

In 1989, he sold the business to Unilab for $30 million. He used the funds from the sale to start Uchida Enterprises. With 78 other investors, Uchida formed the San Jose Nihonmachi Corporation, which invested over $80 million to develop housing and businesses in San Jose's Japantown neighborhood. Uchida also helped form the Japanese American Chamber of Commerce of Silicon Valley.

== Honors and awards ==
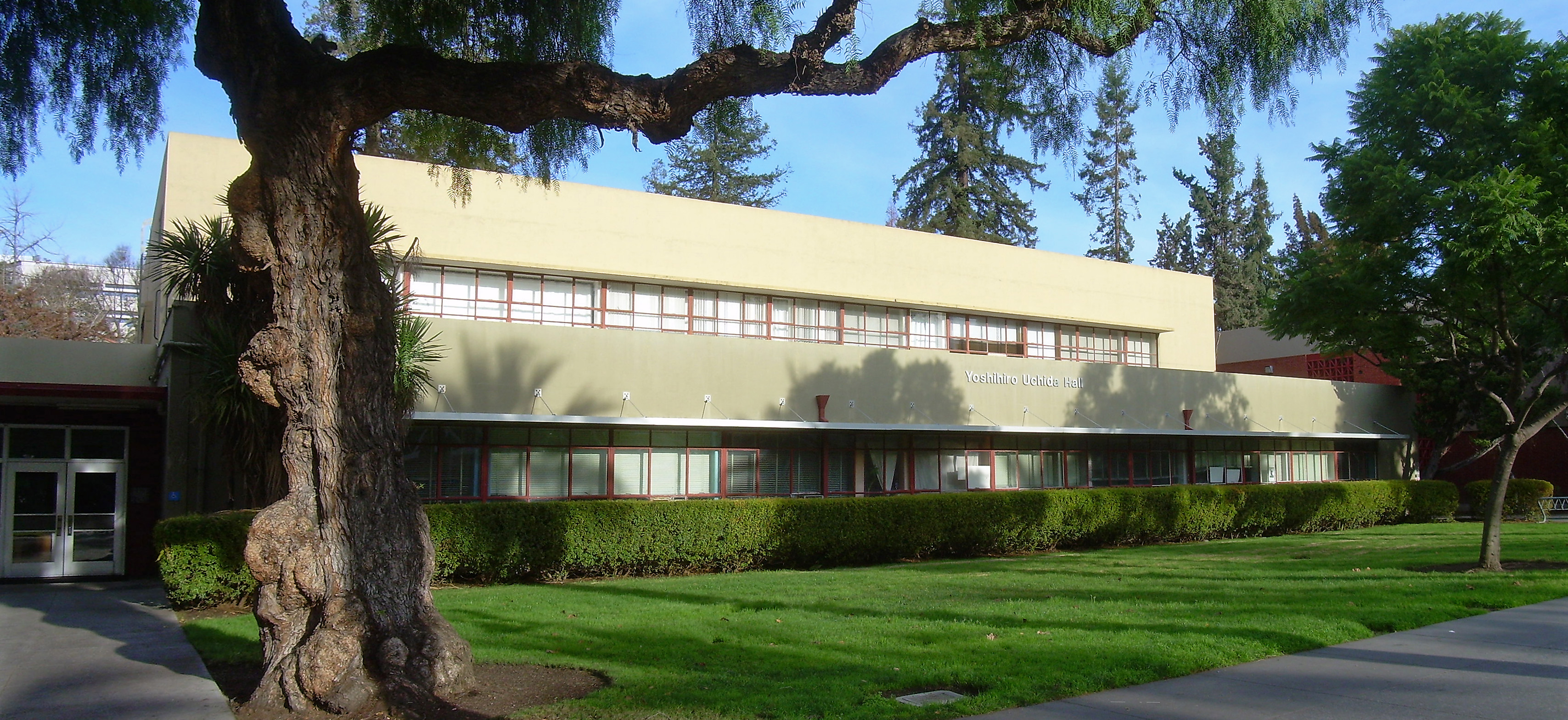
The Yoshihiro Uchida Hall at San Jose State University

For his contributions to judo, Uchida was awarded the Order of the Sacred Treasure with Golden Rays in 1986 by Emperor Hirohito of Japan. He was inducted into the San Jose Sports Hall of Fame in 1996. Uchida has also received many awards from San Jose State, including the university's highest award (the Tower Award) in 1992 and an honorary Doctorate of Humane Letters in 2004. Additionally, the physical education building on campus that houses the judo dojo was renamed "Yoshihiro Uchida Hall" in 1997.

== See also ==
- San Jose State Spartans
