= USA Judo =

- Sport: Judo
- Abbreviation: USA
- Affiliation: IJF
- Regional affiliation: PCJ
- Affiliation date: 2009

Official website
- usjudo.org
- (United States)

USA Judo (officially known as United States Judo, Inc.) is a non-profit organization which represents all areas of U.S. judo practitioners, including athletes, coaches, referees and others. The organization is managed by a staff of seven at the USA Judo National Office which is located at the U.S. Olympic Training Center in Colorado Springs, Colorado. Yosh Uchida became the newly elected President of US Judo Inc in 1996. Keith Bryant was the CEO/Executive Director of USA Judo as of August 2016. Mark C. Hill replaced Lance Nading as Board President in 2017.

== See also ==
- Judo in the United States
- United States Judo Federation
- United States Judo Association
- List of judo organizations
- Judo by country
