= George Uchida =

American male judoka and coach

George Uchida (July 22, 1925 – August 6, 2004) was a judoka, wrestler, author, and coach. Uchida was the brother of San Jose Judo Coach Yosh Uchida. Uchida and other family members were sent to the Poston internment camp during World War II, following the signing of Executive Order 9066. He later served in the US Army in the field of military intelligence. He got key intelligence about Russian involvement in the Korean War. Upon his return he enrolled in San Jose State University majoring in physical education.

== Competition ==
Uchida was a bronze medalist in the 1954 US National Championship for the sport of Judo. He wrestled at San Jose State in 1956, 1957, and 1958.

== Coaching ==
In 1962, he was selected to be the Wrestling Coach at the University of California at Berkley. He hoped to establish Judo in the school as well. By 1972 he served as the Olympic Coach for the US Judo Olympic Team. He also served as the Coach for the US Pan American Team. He also served as the head coach for the National High School Championships in Judo.

== Author ==
Uchida wrote Judo Contest Rules for the Amateur Athletic Union Judo Handbook. He also co wrote Fundamentals of Judo. In his later years he would be an IJF Level A referee.
