= Ichiro Abe =

Japanese judoka (1922–2022)

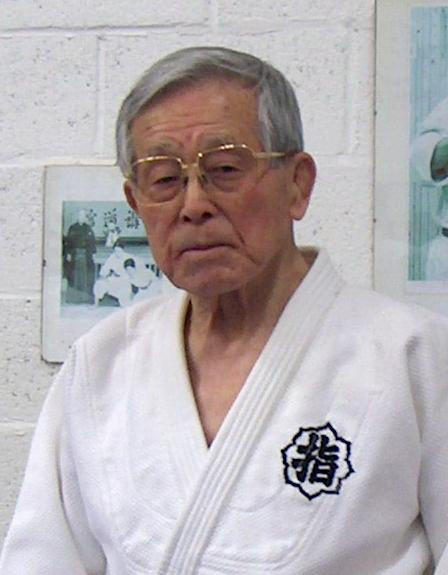

Personal information
- Native name: 安部一郎 Abe Ichiro
- Born: 12 November 1922 Akita Prefecture, Japan
- Died: 27 February 2022 (aged 99) Tokyo, Japan
- Occupation: Judoka

Sport
- Sport: Judo
- Rank: 10th dan black belt

Ichiro Abe (安部一郎, Abe Ichirō; 12 November 1922 – 27 February 2022) was a Japanese judoka. He was head of the Promotions Panel at the Kodokan and former international chairperson of the All Nippon Judo Federation. He was one of only fifteen judoka to have attained Kodokan 10th dan rank, having been promoted at the New Year Kagami biraki Ceremony, 8 January 2006 along with Toshiro Daigo and Yoshimi Osawa.

== Biography ==
Abe was born in 1922 and educated at Tsukuba University. He was sent by the Kodokan as a judo teacher to France in 1951 and Belgium in 1953. He was director of the Kodokan International from 1969 to 1997 and director of the Kodokan Council from 1997 to 2004.

Abe died in Tokyo on 27 February 2022, at the age of 99.
