= Bernard Lepkofker =

American judoka

Personal information
- Nationality: American
- Died: March 17, 2014
- Home town: Brooklyn, New York
- Occupation: Judoka

Sport
- Sport: Judo

Achievements and titles
- Regional finals: New York Judo gold medal (1965)
- National finals: two silver medals and three bronze medals in the US National Championships

Profile at external databases
- JudoInside.com: 48093
- Updated on 15 August 2022

Bernard Lepkofker (d. March 17, 2014) was a competitive judoka from Brooklyn, New York, in the United States. He was a two-time gold medalist at the Maccabiah Games in Israel, won a New York Judo gold medal, and twice won silver medals in the US national championships.

== Early life ==
Lepkofker was raised in a Jewish orphanage, the Pride of Judea Children's Home, and was Jewish. He attended Thomas Jefferson High School, with an initial goal to attend Dayton University. Lepkofker earned a basketball scholarship for college, attending the University of Rio Grande in Ohio, but left after two years.

== Judo career ==
Lepkofker joined the Air Force, and did basic training at F.E. Warren Air Force Base in Wyoming. While in the Air Force he learned judo while stationed in Japan, training at the Kodokan school.

Lepkofker won two silver medals and three bronze medals in the US National Championships during the years 1968, 1974, 1975, 1978, and 1979. In the 1968 National Championships, he lost to future Olympic bronze medalist Allan Coage. Lepkofker was the 1965 New York Judo Gold Medalist.

Lepkofker was the champion of the 1965 Maccabiah Games in Israel, and a competitor in the 1969 Maccabiah Games. At the 1973 Maccabiah Games, he won a gold medal in the heavyweight competition. He also unsuccessfully attempted to make the US Olympic Team.

Lepkofker stood 6'4 and weighed 240 lbs in his prime. He was also one half of the Judo Twins with his brother, Robert Lepkofker. He was a member of the New York Athletic Club.

== Personal life ==
Lepkofker was a Korean War veteran. He and his brother opened up a judo school in Brooklyn, the American Kodokan Judo School, and upon gaining popularity they appeared on The Johnny Carson Show.

Lepkofker died on March 17, 2014.
