= Rank in judo =

Judo belt

In judo, improvement and understanding of the art is denoted by a system of rankings split into kyū and dan grades. These are indicated with various systems of coloured belts, with the black belt indicating a practitioner who has attained a certain level of competence.

== The Kōdōkan Kyū-Dan ranking system ==
Kanō's original kyū-dan grading system
Rank	Senior	Junior	Japanese name
Sixth kyū (beginner)	Light; Blue	Light; Blue	rokkyū (六級)
Fifth kyū Fourth kyū	White	White	gokyū (五級) yonkyū (四級)
Third kyū Second kyū First kyū	Brown	Purple	sankyū (三級) nikyū (二級) ikkyū (一級)
First dan Second dan Third dan Fourth dan Fifth dan	Black		shodan (初段) nidan (二段) sandan (三段) yondan (四段) godan (五段)
Sixth dan Seventh dan Eighth dan Ninth dan	Red and White or Black		rokudan (六段) shichidan (七段) hachidan (八段) kudan (九段)
Tenth dan	Red or Black		jūdan (十段)
Eleventh dan Twelfth dan and higher*	White or Red or Black		juichidan (十一段) junidan (十二段)

Practitioners of Judo (柔道家, Jūdōka) are ranked according to their skill and knowledge, and, for high ranking dan grades, their contribution to the art. Their rank is indicated by the colour of belt that they wear. There are two broad categories of rank: those who have attained a level of competency at which they are considered worthy of a black belt (黒帯, kuro obi) and who hold dan (段) grades and those who are yet to attain that level and who hold kyū (級) grades. Those who hold dan grades are collectively termed Yūdansha (有段者) (literally "person who has dan") and those with kyū grades are Mudansha (無段者), literally "person without dan". High grade "Judoka" 5th dan to 10th dan are Kōdan-sha (高段者) literally "person of high rank" and the "esteemed" grades of 6th, 'IJF' 7th, and 'IJF' 8th dan have alternating red and white panel belts (紅白帯) Kōhaku-obi, and for the "venerable" Kōdan-sha (高段者) "high ranking" grades of 'IJF' 9th and 'IJF' 10th dan, their belts are solid and bright red.

This ranking system was introduced by Kanō Jigorō, the founder of judo, in 1883. However, the current system is not the original one, but based on Kanō's last system introduced between 1926 and 1931, with some modification shortly after Kanō's death in 1938. The first dan grades were awarded to his students Saigō Shirō and Tomita Tsunejirō. Since then it has been widely adopted by other modern martial arts.

In the current system as in use in Japan, there are six student grades ranked in descending numerical order. Beginners were given the rank of sixth kyū (六級, rokkyū) and wore a light blue belt. Once they had passed an elementary level of instruction, they were promoted to fifth kyū (五級, gokyū), when they would adopt the white belt. This they wore through fourth kyū (四級, yonkyū). The remaining three grades ,third kyū (三級, sankyū), second kyū (二級, nikyū) and first kyū (一級, ikkyū) were all indicated with brown belts (for seniors) or with purple belts (for juniors).

1st kyū is the last kyū rank before promotion to first degree black belt (shodan). There are (in practice) 10 dan ranks, which are ranked in ascending numerical order.

== Highest ranking jūdōka ==
=== Kōdōkan-graded jūdan holders ===
The ninth (kudan) and tenth degree black belt (jūdan) and, theoretically, those higher, have no formal requirements. Only 15 individuals have been promoted to the rank of Kōdōkan 10th dan. On January 6, 2006, three individuals were promoted to this rank simultaneously: Daigo Toshirō, Ichirō Abe, and Ōsawa Yoshimi. This is the most ever at the same time, and the first in 22 years. No one has ever been promoted to a rank higher than 10th dan, but in theory the judo rank system is not limited to 10 degrees of black belt. As an educator by profession, Kanō believed that there should be no end to an individual's learning, and therefore no limit to the number of dan ranks. The English language edition (1955) of Illustrated Kodokan Judo, edited by the Kōdōkan, says:

There is no limit ... on the grade one can receive. Therefore if one does reach a stage above 10th dan ... there is no reason why he should not be promoted to 11th dan.

This statement was later clarified, however. Essentially, the dan-rank system was capped at 10 after the death of Kanō. In that respect, in the November 1963 issue of Jūdō, the Kōdōkan's official magazine, the Kōdōkan responding to the question "Do the 11th and 12th Dan really exist?" *clarifies that the hierarchy now stops at 10 and that the Kōdōkan does not envisage any nominations to these grades.

There have only been fifteen 10th dan promotions awarded by the Kōdōkan itself in the history of Judo.

Kōdōkan graded tenth dans (十段, jū-dan)
Name	Lived	Date of promotion
Yamashita Yoshitsugu	1865–1935	1935 posth., antedated
Isogai Hajime	1871–1947	1937
Nagaoka Hideichi	1876–1952	1937
Mifune Kyūzō	1883–1965	1945
Iizuka Kunisaburō	1875–1958	1946
Samura Kaichirō	1880–1964	1948
Tabata Shotarō	1884–1950	1948
Okano Yoshitarō	1885–1967	1967 posth.
Shōriki Matsutarō	1885–1969	1969 posth., antedated
Nakano Shōzō	1888–1977	1977 posth., antedated
Kurihara Tamio	1896–1979	1979 posth., antedated
Kotani Sumiyuki	1903–1991	1984
Abe Ichirō	1922–2022	2006
Daigo Toshirō	1926–2021	2006
Ōsawa Yoshimi	1927–2022	2006

== Variations in rank structure ==
Although dan ranks tend to be consistent between national organizations there is more variation in the kyū grades, with some countries having more kyū grades. Although initially kyū grade belt colours were uniformly white, today a variety of colours are used. The first black belts to denote a dan rank in the 1880s. Initially the wide obi was used; as practitioners trained in kimono, only white and black obi were used. It was not until the early 1900s, after the introduction of the judogi, that an expanded colored belt system of awarding rank was created.

== Belt colors ==
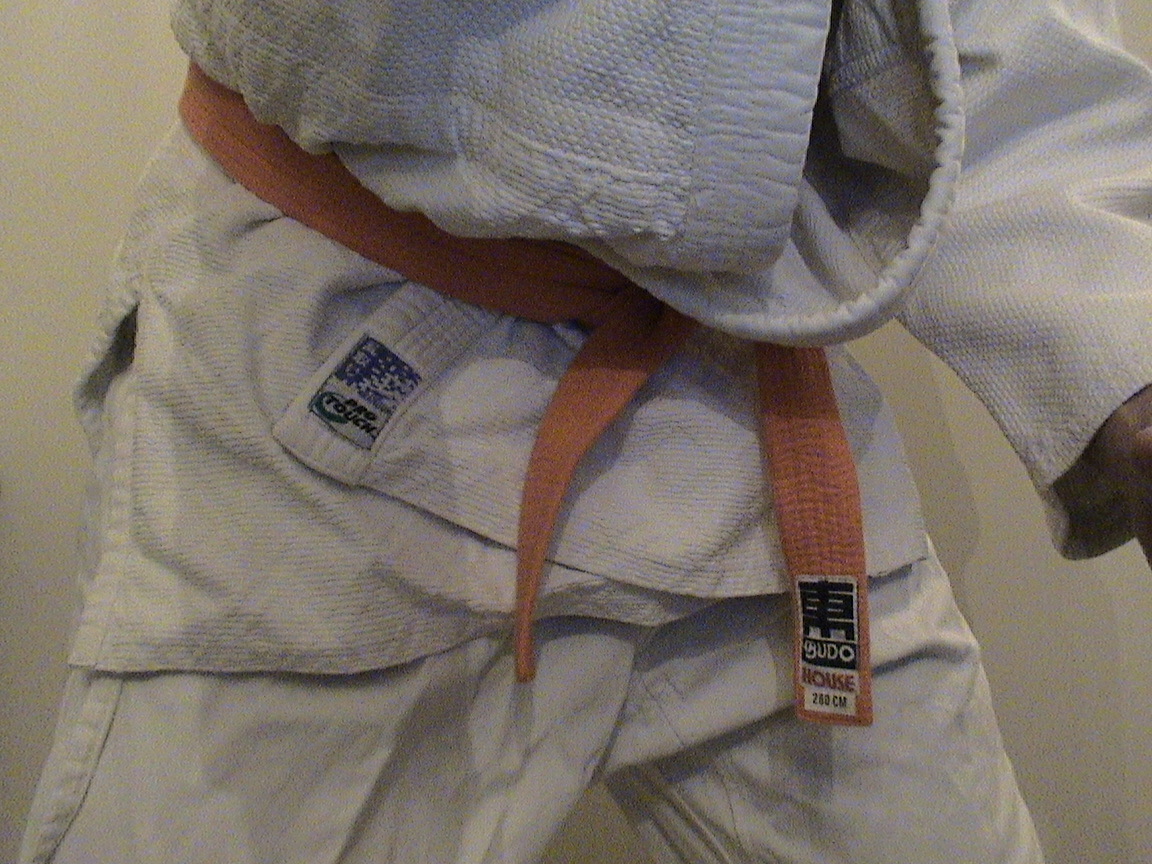
In jūdō, rank is denoted by colored belts.

Examination requirements vary depending on country, age group and of course the grade being attempted. The examination itself may include competition and kata. The kyū ranks are normally awarded by local instructors (sensei), but dan ranks are usually awarded only after an exam supervised by independent judges from a national judo association. For a rank to be recognized, it must be registered with the national judo organization or the Kōdōkan.

The appearance of the belts makes the judoka's level visible. Upon successful graduation, you are entitled to a new degree. The kyu degrees are counted down from 6 to 1. The dan degrees are counted up from 1.

=== Dan ===
For dan ranks, the first five are colored black, 6th, 7th and 8th dan have alternating red and white panels (紅白帯) Kōhaku-obi, commonly known as the "Coral belt," named after the coral snake, and for 9th, 10th dan and above, the belts are solid red. In Europe, according to the ‘IJF’, there is a difference between each grade belts' marking by the difference in length of the alternating white-red coloured blocks of the coral belt, as in “the more blocks in your belt, the higher the grade,” (e.g. for 6th dan, 20cm white-red block, 7th dan: 15cm white-red block, and 8th dan: 10cm white-red block – (in Japan, this difference in block size doesn't seem to apply). In judo's promotion system as originally finalized by Kanō around 1926, there was no maximal dan rank, and judoka holding 10th dan (and above) would normally wear a red belt, but could also wear a white belt (the same color as the beginner or lowest kyū rank), or a black belt. However, since the highest dan rank reached in judo for a living person, or conferred posthumously remains 10th dan, any judo dan rank higher than 10th dan is now considered as a merely historical theoretical option. Some time after the death of Kanō, the promotion system essentially became capped at 10th dan. Furthermore, holders of a dan rank above godan (5th dan) will often wear a plain black belt during regular training practice, and outside any ceremonial duties. In a similar manner to both Brazilian and Gracie Jiu-Jitsu, dan ranks can be signified by either one, or both coral belts with red-black and red-white panels (for example, in the United States).

Judo dan belt colors
Degree	Color	Belt
1st–5th dan	Black	
4th and 5th dan (select dojos)	Black or Red-Black Coral	
6th–8th dan	Black or Red-White Coral	
9th, 10th, and possible 11th dan	Black or Red	

=== Kyu ===
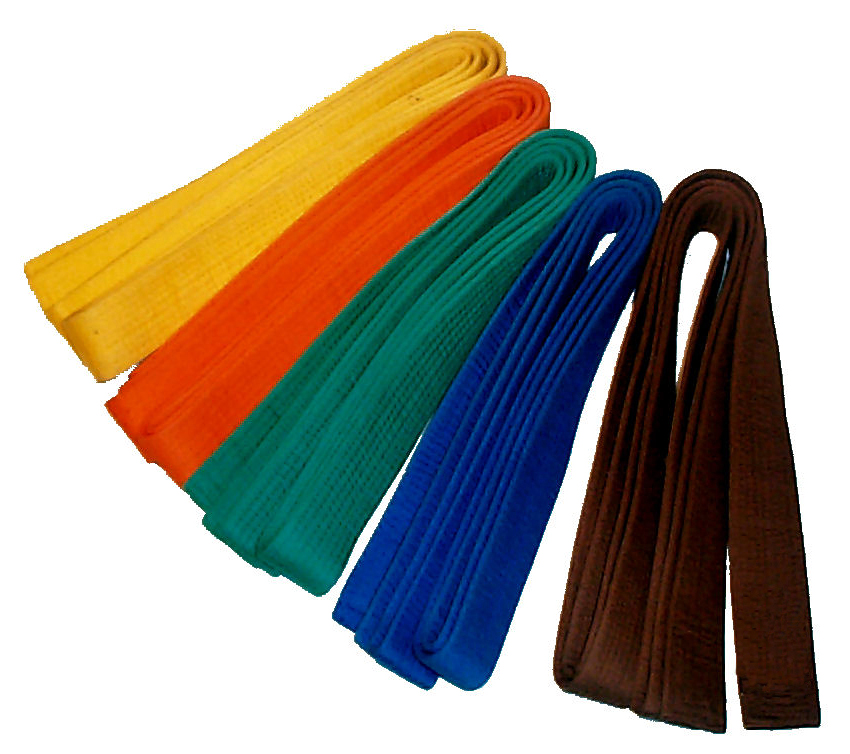
The style of belt commonly worn in modern judo

The Kyu belt system can contain the colors white, red, yellow, orange, green, blue, purple, and brown for both senior and junior practitioners. In some countries junior practitioners have an extra system in place to show the progress in between two kyū grades. The sub rank can be symbolized by a small piece of fabric on the end of the belt. The piece added to the belt can never be of a lower or the same color as the belt worn by the judoka, so an orange belt cannot have a yellow piece, but it can have green, blue or brown.

IJF (International Judo Federation)

Under the IJF system, the belt program classifies kyu 6-3 as Fundamental Judo and kyu 2-1 as Competition Judo. With black belts being classified under Performance Judo. Each kyu grade has a set of general guidelines for expected for each color, while allowing instructors to have autonomy in how grades are awarded.

Judo kyu belt colors of the IJF
	Fundamental Judo				Competition Judo	
Degree	Kyu 6	Kyu 5	Kyu 4	Kyu 3	Kyu 2	Kyu 1
Color	White	Yellow	Orange	Green	Blue	Brown
Belt						

==== Australia ====
In Australia belt rankings for Seniors are, in ascending order: white, yellow, orange, green, blue, brown and finally black. Belt rankings for Juniors follow the same ranks and colours (up to and including brown), but have either 1, 2 or 3 white bars (depending upon age) at each end of the belt, as follows:

- If the judoka is aged up to 10 (Mon), there are to be 3 white bars.
- Between 10 and 13 (Yonen), there are 2 bars.
- Finally, for 13 to 16 years of age (Shonen), there is a single bar.

Judo kyu belt colors of Judo Australia
Degree	Kyu 6	Kyu 5	Kyu 4	Kyu 3	Kyu 2	Kyu 1
Color	White	Yellow	Orange	Green	Blue	Brown
Belt						

==== Austria ====
Judoka older than 15 can take the test for the even and odd Kyu degrees (two-color and one-color) as one test.

In Austria the following belt colors exist:

Judo kyu belt colors of Judo Austria
Degree	Kyu 11	Kyu 10	Kyu 9	Kyu 8	Kyu 7	Kyu 6	Kyu 5	Kyu 4	Kyu 3	Kyu 2	Kyu 1
Color	White	White-Yellow	Yellow	Yellow-Orange	Orange	Orange-Green	Green	Green-Blue	Blue	Blue-Brown	Brown
Belt											
Minimum age	-	7 years	7 years	8 years	9 years	10 years	11 years	12 years	13 years	14 years	15 years

==== Brazil ====
Brazilian belt rankings are normally white, grey, blue, yellow, orange, green, purple, brown. As in some European countries, young judoka in Brazil have an extra system in place to show the progress in between two kyū grades. The sub rank exists between white and orange belts and is symbolized by the ends of the current belt being the color of the next rank.

Judoka above 16 years old can skip some of the basic kyu, until the 5th (considered "basic" kyu by the Brazilian Judo Confederation). It is usual for adults to progress directly from white (12th kyu) to blue belt (8th kyu), not ever taking the grey belt. It is also usual for adults to skip the sub ranks, meaning that they will progress from blue to yellow belt (6th kyu) and then to orange belt (4th kyu).

Judo kyu belt colors of the Brazilian Judo Confederation
Degree	Kyu 12	Kyu 11	Kyu 10	Kyu 9	Kyu 8	Kyu 7	Kyu 6	Kyu 5	Kyu 4	Kyu 3	Kyu 2	Kyu 1
Color	White	White with grey tip	Grey	Grey with blue tip	Blue	Blue with yellow tip	Yellow	Yellow with orange tip	Orange	Green	Purple	Brown
Belt												

==== Canada ====
In Canada belt rankings for Seniors are, in ascending order: white, yellow, orange, green, blue and brown. Belt rankings for Juniors use, white, white-yellow, yellow, yellow-orange, orange, orange-green, green, green-blue, blue, blue-brown, and brown.

Judo kyu belt colors of Judo Canada
Degree	Kyu 6	Kyu 6+	Kyu 5	Kyu 5+	Kyu 4	Kyu 4+	Kyu 3	Kyu 3+	Kyu 2	Kyu 2+	Kyu 1
Color	White	White-Yellow	Yellow	Yellow-Orange	Orange	Orange-Green	Green	Green-Blue	Blue	Blue-Brown	Brown
Belt											

==== Chile ====
Judo kyu belt colors of Federación de Judo de Chile
Degree	Kyu 6	Kyu 5	Kyu 4	Kyu 3	Kyu 2	Kyu 1
Color	White	Yellow	Orange	Green	Blue	Brown
Belt						

==== Czech republic ====
Judo kyu belt colors of the Czech Judo Federation
Degree		Kyu 6/5	Kyu 5	Kyu 5/4	Kyu 4	Kyu 4/3	Kyu 3	Kyu 3/2	Kyu 2	Kyu 1
Color	White	White-Yellow	Yellow	Yellow-Orange	Orange	Orange-Green	Green	Green-Blue	Blue	Brown
Belt										

==== Denmark ====
There are 6 kyu degrees. Seniors wear full-colored belts while children and youth (ages 6–14) also wear half-colored belts.

Judo kyu belt colors of Judo Danmark
Degree	Kyu 6		Kyu 5		Kyu 4		Kyu 3		Kyu 2		Kyu 1
Color	White	White-Yellow	Yellow	White-Orange	Orange	White-Green	Green	White-Blue	Blue	White-Brown	Brown
Belt											

==== Egypt ====
Judo kyu belt colors of EJASF
Degree	Kyu 6	Kyu 6+	Kyu 5	Kyu 5+	Kyu 4	Kyu 4+	Kyu 3	Kyu 3+	Kyu 2	Kyu 2+	Kyu 1
Color	White	White-Yellow	Yellow	Yellow-Orange	Orange	Orange-Green	Green	Green-Blue	Blue	Blue-Brown	Brown
Belt											

==== Finland ====
In Finland, junior sub ranks below a certain age are denoted by one to three red stripes on both ends of the belt. They are also used to signify that joint locks, chokes or strangles may not be performed upon the wearer as those are not taught nor applied to juniors below the age of 15 due to safety reasons.

Judo kyu belt colors in Finland
Degree	Kyu 6	Kyu 5	Kyu 4	Kyu 3	Kyu 2	Kyu 1
Color	White	Yellow	Orange	Green	Blue	Brown
Belt						

==== France ====
Judo kyu belt colors of the French Judo Federation
Degree	Kyu 11	Kyu 10	Kyu 9	Kyu 8	Kyu 7	Kyu 6	Kyu 5	Kyu 4	Kyu 3	Kyu 2	Kyu 1
Color	White	White-Yellow			Yellow	Yellow-Orange	Orange	Orange-Green	Green	Blue	Brown
Belt											
Minimum age	3 years	4 years	5 years	6 years	7 years	8 years	9 years	10 years	11 years	12 years	14 years

==== Germany ====
Minimum age requirement for first Dan is 16 years (exception 15 years with special preconditions).

In Germany the following belt colors exist:

Judo kyu belt colors of the German Judo Federation (last update 2024-01-16)
Degree		Kyu 8	Kyu 7	Kyu 6	Kyu 5	Kyu 4	Kyu 3	Kyu 2	Kyu 1
Color	White	White-Yellow	Yellow	Yellow-Orange	Orange	Orange-Green	Green	Blue	Brown
Belt									
Minimum age	-				8 years	8 years	11 years		13 years (Note: kata and shiai) / 14 years (Note: self defense and taiso)

==== Italy ====
Judo kyu belt colors of the FIJLKAM
Degree	Kyu 6		Kyu 5		Kyu 4		Kyu 3		Kyu 2		Kyu 1
Color	White	White-Yellow	Yellow	Yellow-Orange	Orange	Orange-Green	Green	Green-Blue	Blue	Blue-Brown	Brown
Belt											

==== Ireland ====
In Ireland the senior belt system is white, yellow, orange, green, blue, brown and black. A practitioner must be at least sixteen before being eligible to grade for blackbelt. For white, yellow, orange and green belt gradings are held in the practitioners club and are based on demonstration of a syllabus and kata. For promotion to blue and brown the judoka must compete at a national grading against players of their own rank and win at least two fights by ippon or wazari. To achieve black belt a judoka must earn 100 points i.e. 10 points for every ippon or waza-ari victory against a brown belt.

Judo kyu belt colors of the Irish Judo Association
Senior	Degree								Kyu 5				Kyu 4		Kyu 3	Kyu 2	Kyu 1
Senior	Color	White							Yellow				Orange		Green	Blue	Brown
Senior	Belt	White															
Senior	Minimum age	White	14 years														
Minor (U14) Shamrock (U8)	Degree		1st Shamrock	2nd Shamrock	Mon 2	Mon 3	Mon 4	Mon 5	Mon 6	Mon 7	Mon 8	Mon 9	Mon 10	Mon 11	Mon 12		
Minor (U14) Shamrock (U8)	Color		Red	Red	Red	White-Yellow	Yellow	Yellow-Orange	Orange	Orange-Green	Green	Green-Blue	Blue	Blue-Brown	Brown		
Minor (U14) Shamrock (U8)	Belt																
Minor (U14) Shamrock (U8)	Minimum age	4 years	5 years	6 years	7 years		8 years		9 years		10 years		11 years		12 years		

==== Israel ====
In Israel the following belt colors exist:

Judo kyu belt colors of the Israel Judo Association
Degree	Kyu 6				Kyu 5			Kyu 4		Kyu 3		Kyu 2	Kyu 1
Color	White	White-Purple	Purple	White-Yellow	Purple-Yellow	Yellow	Yellow-Orange	Orange	Orange-Green	Green	Green-Blue	Blue	Brown
Belt													

==== Japan ====
In Japan, the use of belt colors is related to the age of the student. Some clubs will only have black and white, others will include a brown belt for advanced kyū grades and at the elementary school level it is common to see a green belt for intermediate levels.

==== Netherlands ====
Judo kyu belt colors in Dutch Judo Federation
Degree	Kyu 6	Kyu 5	Kyu 4	Kyu 3	Kyu 2	Kyu 1
Color	White	Yellow	Orange	Green	Blue	Brown
Belt						

==== Norway ====
Judo kyu belt colors in Norwegian Judo Federation
Degree	Kyu 6	Kyu 5	Kyu 4	Kyu 3	Kyu 2	Kyu 1
Color	White	Yellow	Orange	Green	Blue	Brown
Belt						

==== Portugal ====
Judo kyu belt colors of the Portuguese Judo Federation
Degree	Kyu 6		Kyu 5		Kyu 4		Kyu 3		Kyu 2		Kyu 1
Color	White	White-Yellow	Yellow	Yellow-Orange	Orange	Orange-Green	Green	Green-Blue	Blue	Blue-Brown	Brown
Belt											

==== South Africa ====
Judo kyu belt colors of Judo South Africa
Degree		Kyu 8	Kyu 7	Kyu 6	Kyu 5	Kyu 4	Kyu 3	Kyu 2	Kyu 1
Color	White	White-Yellow	Yellow	Yellow-Orange	Orange	Orange-Green	Green	Blue	Brown
Belt									

==== Sweden ====
Judo kyu belt colors of the Swedish Judo Federation
Degree		Kyu 6	Kyu 5		Kyu 4		Kyu 3		Kyu 2		Kyu 1
Color	White	White-Yellow	Yellow	Yellow-Orange	Orange	Orange-Green	Green	Green-Blue	Blue	Blue-Brown	Brown
Belt											
Minimum age		7 years		8 years		9 years	10 years	11 years	12 years	13 years	15 years

==== United Kingdom ====
In the United Kingdom a red belt is used between the white and yellow belts to signify full membership of the home Country's national Judo governing body i.e. 'JudoAlba' (Scots Gaelic) JudoScotland, 'Judo Cymru' (Welsh) Welsh Judo, 'Norlin Airlann Judo' (Ulster Scots) or Tuaisceart Éireann Judo (Irish Gaelic) Northern Ireland Judo and in England, British Judo (BJA). A practitioner must be at least fifteen before being eligible to grade for Shodan (初段) Black belt 1st dan. The British Judo Association Kyu Grade system is as follows:

Judo kyu belt colors of the British Judo Association
Degree	Novice	Kyu 6	Kyu 5	Kyu 4	Kyu 3	Kyu 2	Kyu 1
Color	White	Red	Yellow	Orange	Green	Blue	Brown
Belt							

==== United States ====
In the United States, only seniors (usually age 16 and older) are allowed to earn the dan levels, signified by wearing the same belts. The United States Judo Federation (USJF) and United States Judo Association (USJA) both recognize the same dan grades. Advanced kyū levels can be earned by both seniors and juniors (children under the age of 16) and are signified by wearing belts of various colors other than black, coral, or red. The order of belt colors can vary from dōjō to dōjō, depending on the dōjō's organizational affiliation.

===== Seniors =====
For seniors, both the USJF and the USJA specify six kyū ranks, as listed in the table. In a similar manner to Brazilian Jiu Jitsu, The USJA requires "Beginners" (not yet qualified as kyūs) to wear a beginning white belt until they test for yellow belt, as well as 4th and 5th level dans to wear red-black coral belts, and 6-8th level dans to wear red-white coral belts. The USJA also recommends that a patch is worn, specifying the practitioner's level for brown kyū, and dan levels.

Seniors
	Degree	Beginner	Rokkyū	Gokyū	Yonkyū	Sankyū	Nikyū	Ikkyū
USJF	Color	-	White	Green	Blue	Brown	Brown	Brown
USJF	Belt	-						
USJA	Color	White	Yellow	Orange	Green	Brown	Brown	Brown
USJA	Belt							

===== Juniors =====
The USJF Junior ranking system specifies ranks up to 11th kyū (jūichikyū). The USJA Junior ranking system specifies twelve levels of kyū rank, beginning with "Junior 1st Degree" (equivalent to jūnikyū, or 12th kyū) and ending with "Junior 12th Degree" (equivalent to ikkyū). As with the senior practitioners, the USJA recommends that juniors wear a patch specifying their rank. When a USJA Junior reaches age 16 or 17, their conversion to Senior rank is:

- Yellow belt converts to 6th kyū (rokkyū)
- Orange belt converts to 5th kyū (gokyū)
- Green belt converts to 4th kyū (yonkyū)
- Blue belt or higher converts to 3rd kyū (sankyū)

Juniors
	Degree	Jūnikyū	Jūichikyū	Jūkyū	Kukyū	Hachikyū	Nanakyū	Rokkyū	Gokyū	Yonkyū	Sankyū	Nikyū	Ikkyū
USA Judo	Color		White	White-Yellow	Yellow	Yellow-Orange	Orange	Orange-Green	Green	Green-Blue	Blue	Blue- purple	Purple
USA Judo	Belt												
USJF	Color		White	White-Yellow	Yellow	Yellow-Orange	Orange	Orange-Green	Green	Green-Blue	Blue	Blue- purple	Purple
USJF	Belt												
USJA	Name	Junior 12th Class	Junior 11th Class	Junior 10th Class	Junior 9th Class	Junior 8th Class	Junior 7th Class	Junior 6th Class	Junior 5th Class	Junior 4th Class	Junior 3rd Class	Junior 2nd Class	Junior 1st Class
USJA	Color	White	Yellow	Orange	Orange	Green	Green	Blue	Blue	Purple	Purple	Brown	Brown
USJA	Belt												
