= Philip S. Porter =

American judoka

Philip S. Porter (1925 – August 7, 2011) was a martial artist in the United States.

== Biography ==
Porter began his martial arts career as a boxer in 1943 at age 18. He was later a member of the West Point Boxing Team and, in 1950, Light Heavyweight Boxing Champion of the Western Area of the Air Training Command, USAF. He graduated from the United States Military Academy at West Point in 1948, and served in the U.S. Army and Air Force for 25 years, retiring as a major in 1967.

Porter started training in Judo, Jujutsu, and Karate in 1951 while serving on a Strategic Air Command (SAC) combat crew at Travis Air Force Base, California. His first teacher was Walter Todd, a 2nd Degree in Judo, and the first American to be awarded a black belt in Shotokan Karate. Todd was later promoted to 8th Degree Black Belt in Shudokan Karate.

Porter started competing in Judo in 1951 and had a competitive career spanning over 50 years. He was champion of United States Air Forces in Europe in 1957, won a Bronze Medal in the US Senior Nationals in 1963, won the US National Masters Championship four times (1975,1977, 1980 and 1981) and won two gold and a silver medal in the 1998 World Master athlete Games in Ottawa, Canada in 1998.

Porter was active as a national and international referee in Judo for many years. He rewrote the IJF contest rules in 1967. He refereed the finals in the 1965 World Judo Championships in Brazil between Geesink and Matsunaga. He served on the six-member Consultative Committee of Referees for the first Judo Olympics in Tokyo in 1964, and was the referee for the team finals in the World CISM Games of 1971 in Vienna, Austria.

He was one of the founders of the United States Judo Association (USJA) formed in 1954. He also served three years as National Chairman of the AAU Judo Committee (1961–1964), Chairman of the U.S. Olympic Judo Committee (1964–1968), Secretary General of the Pan American Judo Union (1964–1967), Technical Director of the Pan American Judo Union (1967–1969), President, U. S. Judo Association (1980–1995); Editor, "American Judo" (1960–1995), president and head coach, National Judo Institute and National Judo Team, (1980–1995).

Porter founded the United States Martial Arts Association (USMAA) in 1995 and remained president until his death in August 2011.

== Judo competition record ==
Porter's autobiography lists the following accomplishments:

- 1951: started competing in Judo
- 1957: US Air Force USAFE champion
- 1963: placed in the US Senior Nationals
- 1998: two gold and a silver medal in the 1998 World MasterAthlete Games in Ottawa, Canada.

== Martial arts ranks ==
Porter's autobiography lists ranks in the following martial arts:

- Budo Taijutsu - 10th dan, Masaaki Hatsumi 1998.
- Judo - 10th dan, from USMA. 2004.
- Judo - 9th dan, from USJA. 1994
- Jujutsu - 10th dan, from USMA and Beikoku Mizu Ryu JuJutsu. 1997.
- Jun Kin Shin - 10th dan (soke). (Porter founded Jun Kin Shin)
- Taiho Jitsu - 10th dan, from Mid-Atlantic Self Defense Association. 1997
- Karate - 8th dan (honorary), from American Shotokan Karate Alliance. 1996.
