= Kagami biraki =

Traditional Japanese ceremony

Kagami mochi

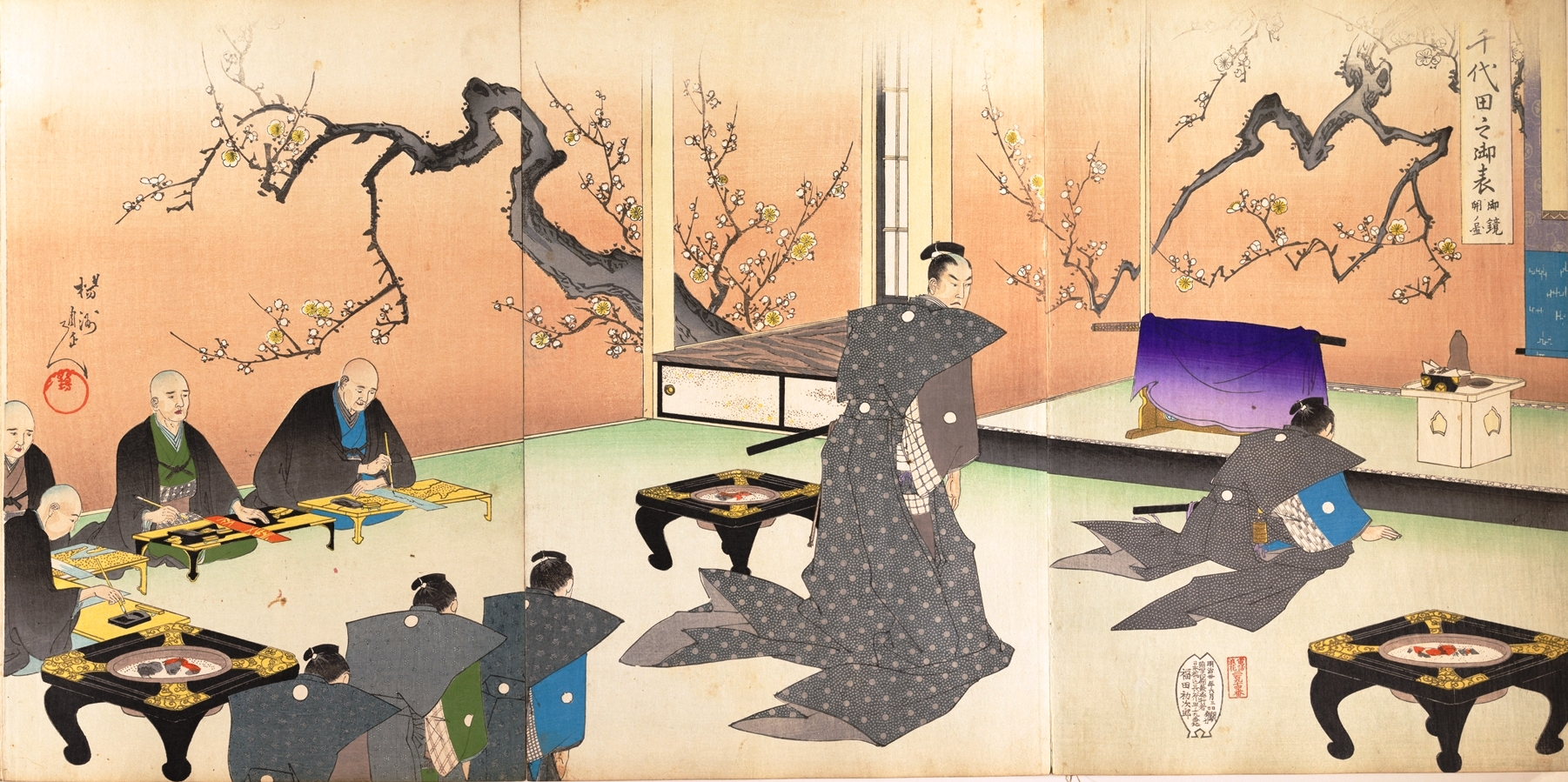
Kagami biraki ceremony at Edo Castle

Kagami biraki (鏡開き, lit. 'opening the mirror'; understood as "breaking of the mochi") is a traditional Japanese ceremony where kagami mochi are broken open. It traditionally falls on January 11 (odd numbers are associated with being good luck in Japan). The term also refers to the opening of a cask of sake at a party or ceremony.

== History ==
The fourth Tokugawa shōgun, Tokugawa Ietsuna, was the first to hold a kagami mochi ceremony 300 years ago. On the eve of war, he gathered his daimyō in his castle to break open a sake cask. Upon achieving victory, a new tradition was born.

As for the date on which Kagami biraki is held, one theory is that it was held every year on January 20 during the Muromachi period (1336-1573) and later changed to January 11 in many parts of Japan after the third Tokugawa shogun, Tokugawa Iemitsu, died on January 20 during the Edo period (1603-1867).

== Ceremony ==
The ceremony nowadays is also performed at weddings, sporting events, housewarmings, opening days at new companies, and other significant events worthy of being celebrated.

In Japan, mochi was traditionally made at home, but most families today buy it ready-made. Over the holidays, a pair of round mochi (kagami mochi) the size of small plates – one a little larger than the other – is stacked on a stand and placed in a household Shinto or Buddhist altar or tokonoma as an offering to the deities that visit on New Year's.

The ornamental mochi is removed on January 11 and broken into smaller pieces before being eaten. By this time, the kagami mochi is usually quite brittle, and cracks appear on the surface. The mochi is not cut with a knife, since cutting has negative connotations (cutting off ties) and is instead broken with one's hands or a hammer.

Many Japanese martial arts dojo use the kagami biraki ceremony to signify their first practice of the New Year.

Masu being used to drink sake at Kagami biraki celebration as part of a modern Japanese New Year celebration.

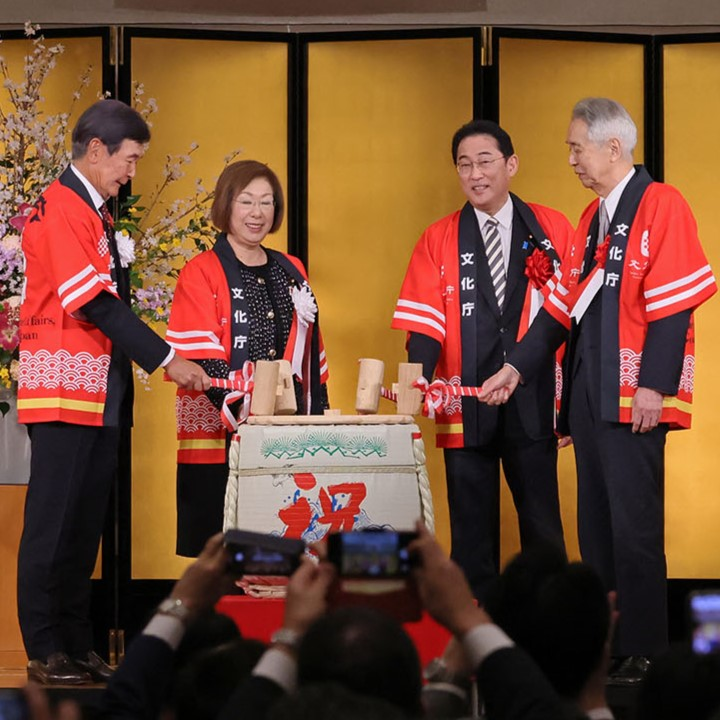
The sake version of kagami biraki by VIPs wearing happi coats

The sake version of the ceremony (based on the original practice) involves presenting a wooden barrel of iwai-zake ("celebration sake") to the celebrants at the beginning of the event. The round, wooden lid of this barrel (representing harmony) is then broken open with wooden mallets handled by VIPs (thus the event breaking open good fortune) and the contents then freely distributed among the participants.

== See also ==
- Breaking bread in Europe, particularly in the Christian Eucharist
