= United States Judo Association =

Judo Association

- Sport: Judo
- Jurisdiction: National
- Membership: 20,000+
- Abbreviation: USJA
- Founded: Unofficial 1935 Armed Forces Judo Association 1957 United States Judo Association 1969
- Affiliation: USA Judo
- Regional affiliation: United States
- President: David Brogan

Official website
- usja.net
- (United States)

The United States Judo Association is a sports association in the United States. It was formed in 1969 following a reorganization of the Armed Forces Judo Association, and is one of three national judo associations in the United States, the other two being USA Judo and the United States Judo Federation.

== History ==
The US Judo Association was founded by George Harris, George Bass, Robey Reed, Jim Bregman, Philip S. Porter, Rick Mertins, and Karl Geis.

== Presidents and Executive Directors ==
- Philip S. Porter
- Edward Szrejter
- George Bass
- George Harris
- Jim Nichols
- Jim Bregman
- Jesse Jones
- Mike Szrejter
- Jim Webb
- AnnMaria De Mars
- Gary Goltz
- Marc Cohen
- John Paccione
- Bob Rush
- Celita Schutz
- Andrew Connelly
- David Brogan

== See also ==
- List of judo organizations
