= United States Judo Federation =

American judo organization

- Sport: Judo
- Founded: 1952
- Affiliation: USA Judo
- Regional affiliation: United States
- President: Mitchell Palacio

Official website
- www.usjf.com
- (United States)

The United States Judo Federation is a non-profit corporation dedicated to promoting judo in the United States. Its national office is in Ontario, Oregon.

== History ==
The United States Judo Federation (USJF) was originally known as the Amateur Judo Association in 1952. In 1955, it was renamed the Judo Black Belt Federation. As late as 1955, the JBBF was the only judo federation in the United States. In 1967, it changed its name to the United States Judo Federation. In 1969, a faction of the Armed Forces Judo Association became the United States Judo Association.

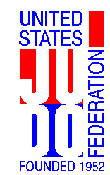

In 2007, USJF sanctioned competitions and tournaments in at least nine different states.

In contrast with USA Judo, which focuses on elite athletes and American participation in Olympic and international tournaments, USJF's focus is on "grassroots" judo.

== Former leadership ==
- Eichi Karl Koiwai (1968–1978)
- Mas Tamura
- Kevin Asano

== See also ==
- List of judo organizations
