= Hanami =

Japanese traditional custom

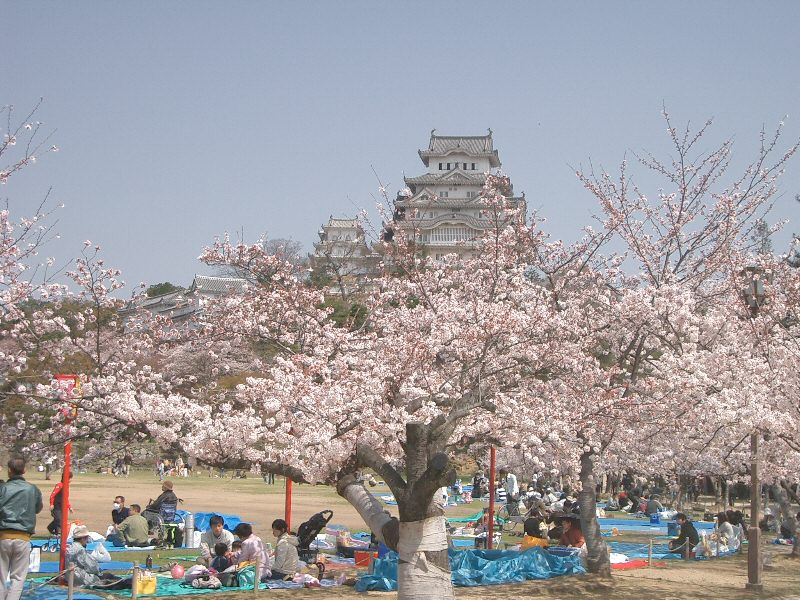
Hanami picnics in front of Himeji Castle, 2005

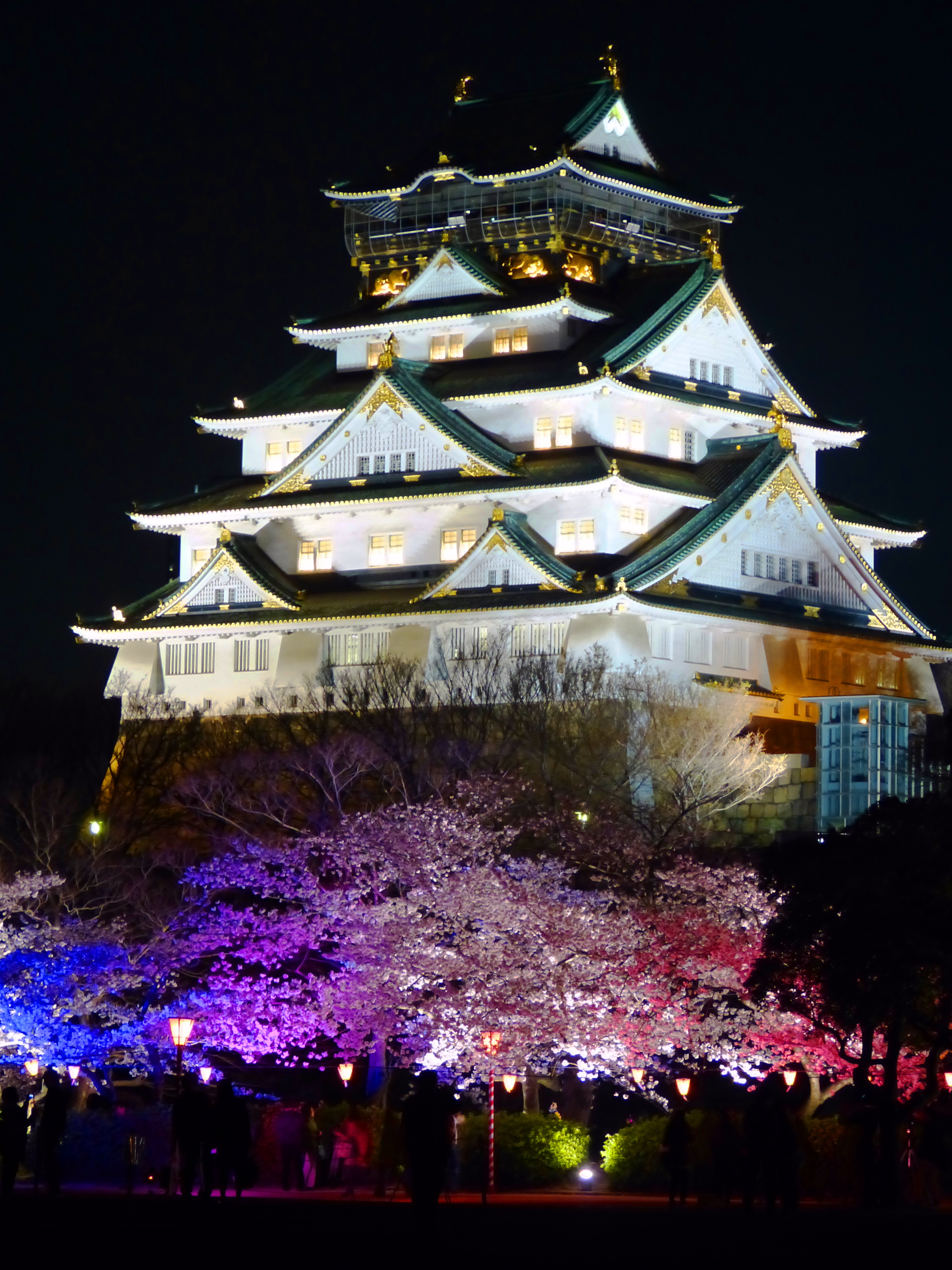
Osaka Castle

Hanami (花見; "flower viewing"; pronounced [hanamiꜜ]) is the Japanese traditional custom of enjoying the transient beauty of flowers; flowers (花, hana) in this case almost always mean those of the cherry (桜, sakura) or, less frequently, plum (梅, ume) trees. From the end of March to early May, cherry trees bloom all over Japan, and around the second week of January on the island of Okinawa. The blossom forecast (桜前線, sakura-zensen) "cherry blossom front" is announced each year by the Japan Meteorological Agency and watched carefully by those planning hanami, as the blossoms only last a week or two.

In modern-day Japan, hanami mostly consists of having an outdoor party beneath the sakura during daytime or at night. In some contexts the Sino-Japanese term kan'ō (観桜; view-cherry) is used instead, particularly for festivals. Hanami at night is called yozakura (夜桜) "night cherry blossom". In many places such as Ueno Park temporary paper lanterns are hung for the purpose of yozakura. On the island of Okinawa, decorative electric lanterns are hung in the trees for evening enjoyment, such as on the trees ascending Mt. Yae, near Motobu Town, or at the Nakijin Castle.

A more ancient form of hanami also exists in Japan, which is enjoying the plum blossoms instead, which is narrowly referred to as umemi (梅見; plum-viewing). This kind of hanami is popular among older people, because they are calmer than the sakura parties, which usually involve younger people and can sometimes be very crowded and noisy.

== History ==
In these spring days,
when tranquil light encompasses
the four directions,
why do the blossoms scatter
with such uneasy hearts?

— Ki no Tomonori (c. 850 – c. 904)

The practice of hanami is many centuries old. The custom is said to have started during the Nara period (710–794) when it was plum or ume blossoms that people admired in the beginning. The Japanese practice of hanami originated from the Chinese custom of enjoying poetry and wine underneath plum blossom trees while viewing their flowers, that was replicated by Japanese elites. This is supported by the fact that hanami started in urban areas rather than rural areas, that Japanese people initially admired plum blossoms like the Chinese rather than cherry blossoms, and that classic Japanese poetry does not associate cherry blossoms with merriness.

By the Heian period (794–1185), cherry blossoms or sakura came to attract more attention than the plum blossom and hanami was synonymous with sakura. From then on, in both waka and haiku, "flowers" meant "sakura". The historical text Nihon Kōki, documented the first observation of the sakura bloom in the year 812, which has been observed and recorded over the next twelve centuries.

Hanami was first used as a term analogous to cherry blossom viewing in the Heian era novel The Tale of Genji. Although a wisteria viewing party was also described, the terms "hanami" and "flower party" were subsequently used only in reference to cherry blossom viewing.

Sakura was originally used to divine that year's harvest as well as announce the rice-planting season. People believed in kami inside the trees and made offerings. Afterwards, they partook of the offering with sake.

Emperor Saga of the Heian period adopted this practice, and held flower-viewing parties with sake and feasts underneath the blossoming boughs of sakura trees in the Imperial Court in Kyoto. Poems would be written praising the delicate flowers, which were seen as a metaphor for life itself, luminous and beautiful yet fleeting and ephemeral. This was said to be the origin of Hanami in Japan.

If there were no cherry blossoms in this world
How much more tranquil our hearts would be in spring.

— Ariwara no Narihira (825–880)

The custom was originally limited to the elite of the Imperial Court, but soon spread to Samurai society and, by the Edo period, to the common people as well. Tokugawa Yoshimune planted areas of cherry blossom trees to encourage this. Under the sakura trees, people had lunch and drank sake in cheerful feasts.

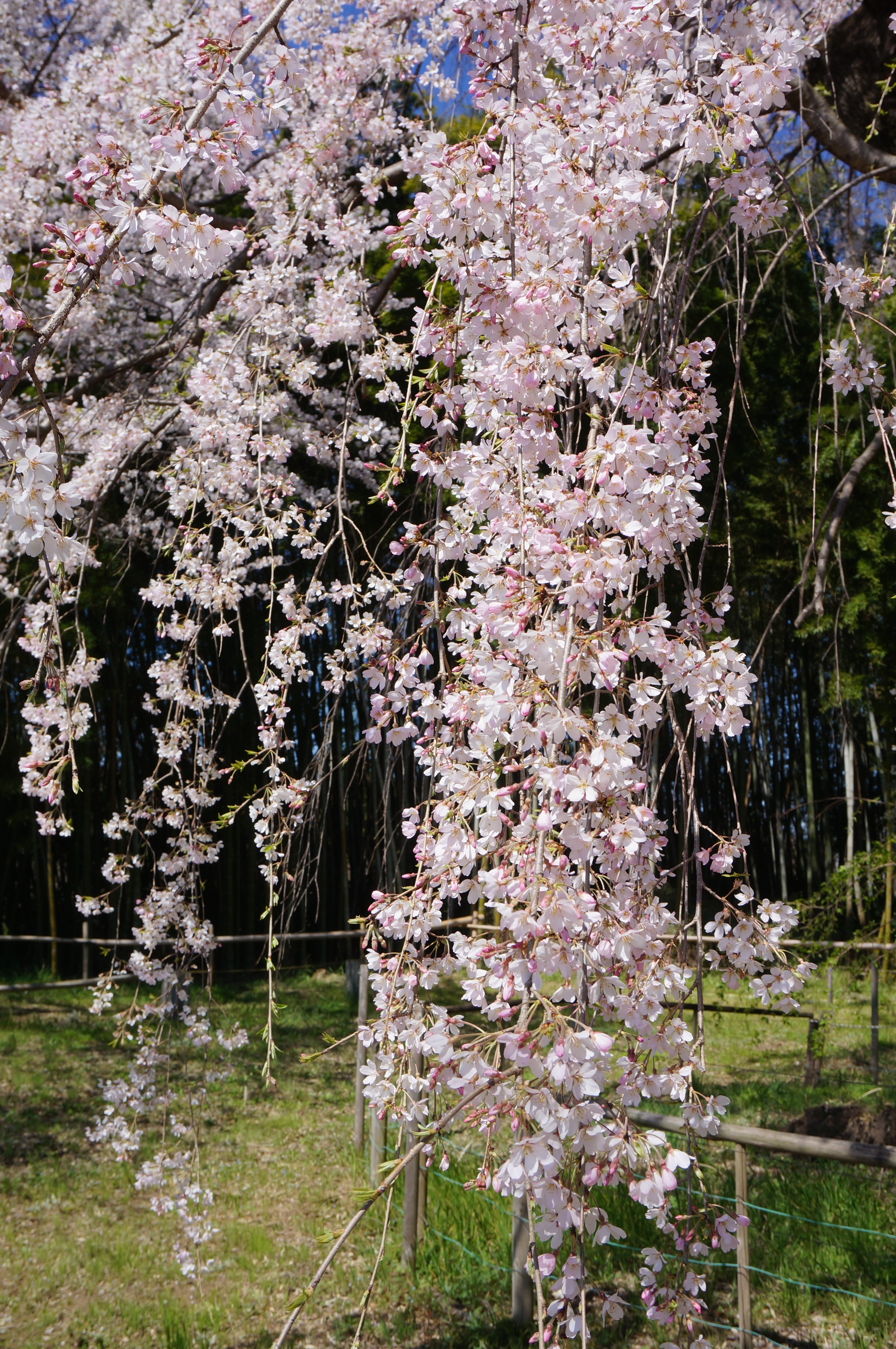
'Shidare-zakura' is the first recorded cultivar in Japan.

Since a book written in the Heian period mentions "weeping cherry" (しだり櫻, shidarizakura), one of the cultivars with pendulous branches, it is considered that Prunus itosakura 'Pendula' (Sidare-zakura) is the oldest cultivar in Japan. In the Kamakura period, when the population increased in the southern Kanto region, Oshima cherry, which originated in Izu Oshima Island, was brought to Honshu and cultivated there, and then brought to capital, Kyoto. In the Muromachi period, the Sato-zakura Group which was born from complex interspecific hybrids based on Oshima cherry, began to appear.

The Jindai-zakura, a tree which is about 2,000 years old

Prunus itosakura (syn. Prunus subhirtella, Edo higan), a wild species, grows slowly, but has the longest life span among cherry trees and is easy to grow into large trees. For this reason, there are many large and long-lived trees of this species in Japan, and their cherry trees are often regarded as sacred and have become a landmark that symbolizes Shinto shrines, Buddhist temples and local areas. Famous examples include the Jindai-zakura (~2,000 years old), Usuzumi-zakura (~1,500 years old), and Daigo-zakura (~1,000 years old).

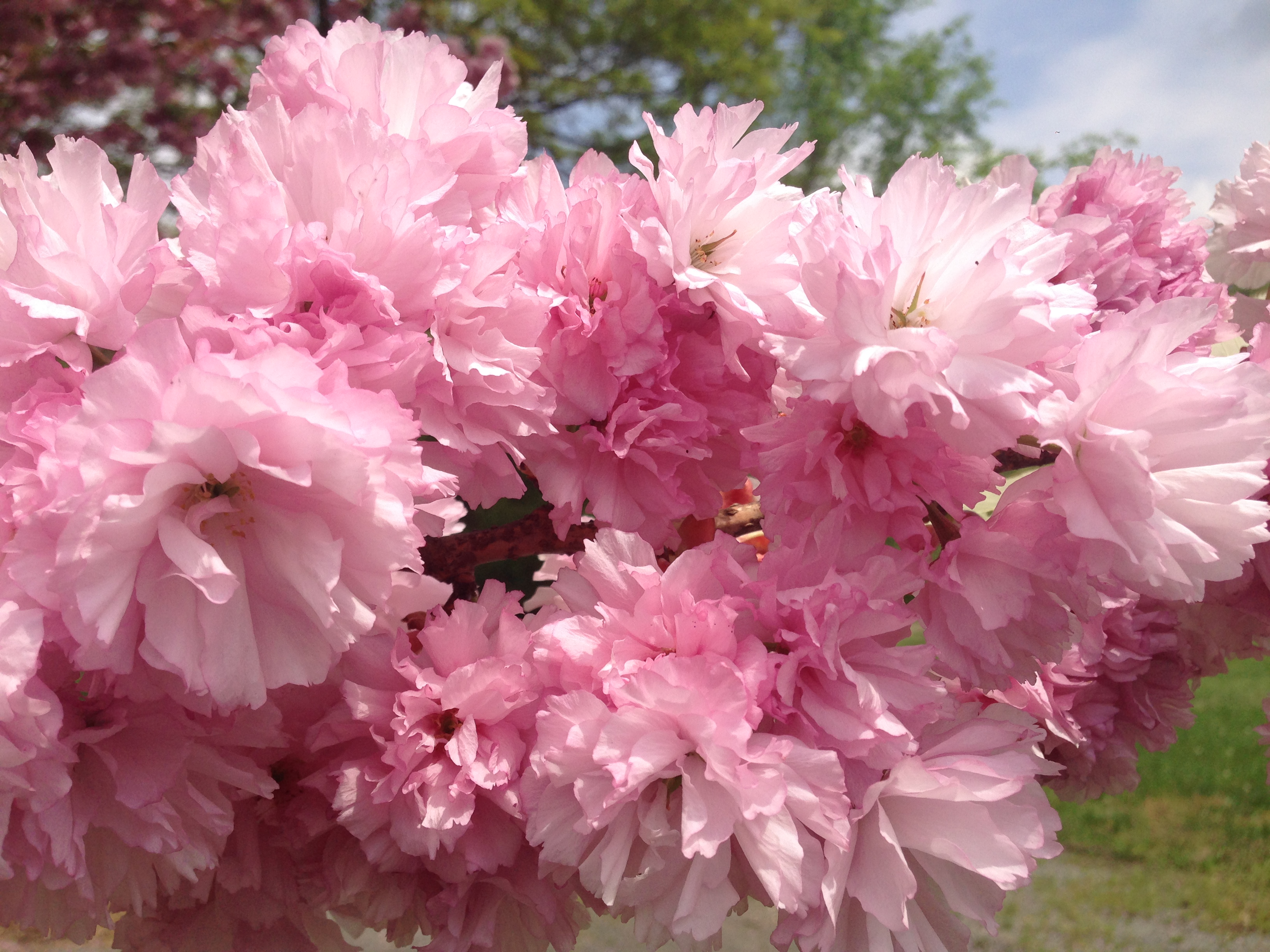
'Kanzan' is a double-flowered cultivar developed in the Edo period. It has 20 to 50 petals in a flower.

In the Edo period, various double-flowered cultivars were produced and planted on the banks of rivers, on Buddhist temples, in Shinto shrines and in daimyo gardens in urban areas such as Edo, and the common people living in urban areas could enjoy them. Books from that period recorded more than 200 varieties of cherry blossoms and mentioned many varieties of cherry blossoms which are currently known, such as 'Kanzan'. However, the situation was limited to urban areas, and the main objects of hanami across the country were wild species such as Prunus jamasakura (Yamazakura) and Oshima cherry, which were widely distributed in the country.

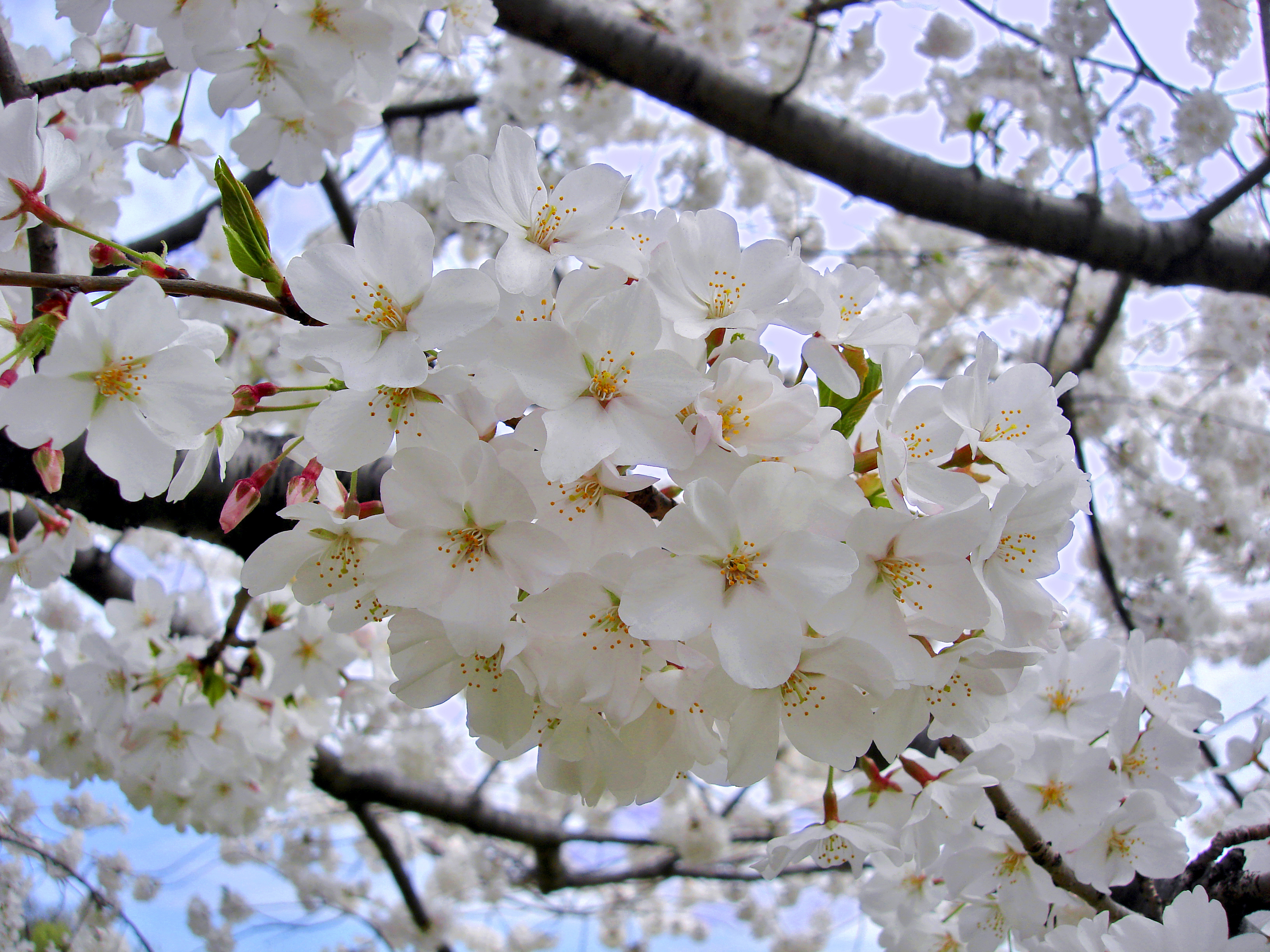
Yoshino cherry ('Somei-yoshino') has rapidly spread throughout Japan since the Meiji period.

Since the Meiji period when Japan was modernized, Yoshino cherry has spread throughout Japan, and the object of hanami for Japanese people has changed to Yoshino cherry. On the other hand, various cultivars other than Yoshino cherry were cut down one after another due to the rapid modernization of cities, such as reclamation of waterways and demolition of daimyo gardens. The gardener Takagi Magoemon and the village mayor of Kohoku Village Shimizu Kengo worried about this situation and saved them from the danger of extinction by making a row of cherry trees composed of various cultivars on the Arakawa River bank. In Kyoto, Sano Toemon XIV, a gardener, collected various cultivars and propagated them. After World War II, these cultivars were inherited by the National Institute of Genetics, Tama Forest Science Garden and the Flower Association of Japan, and from the 1960s onwards various cultivars were again used for hanami.

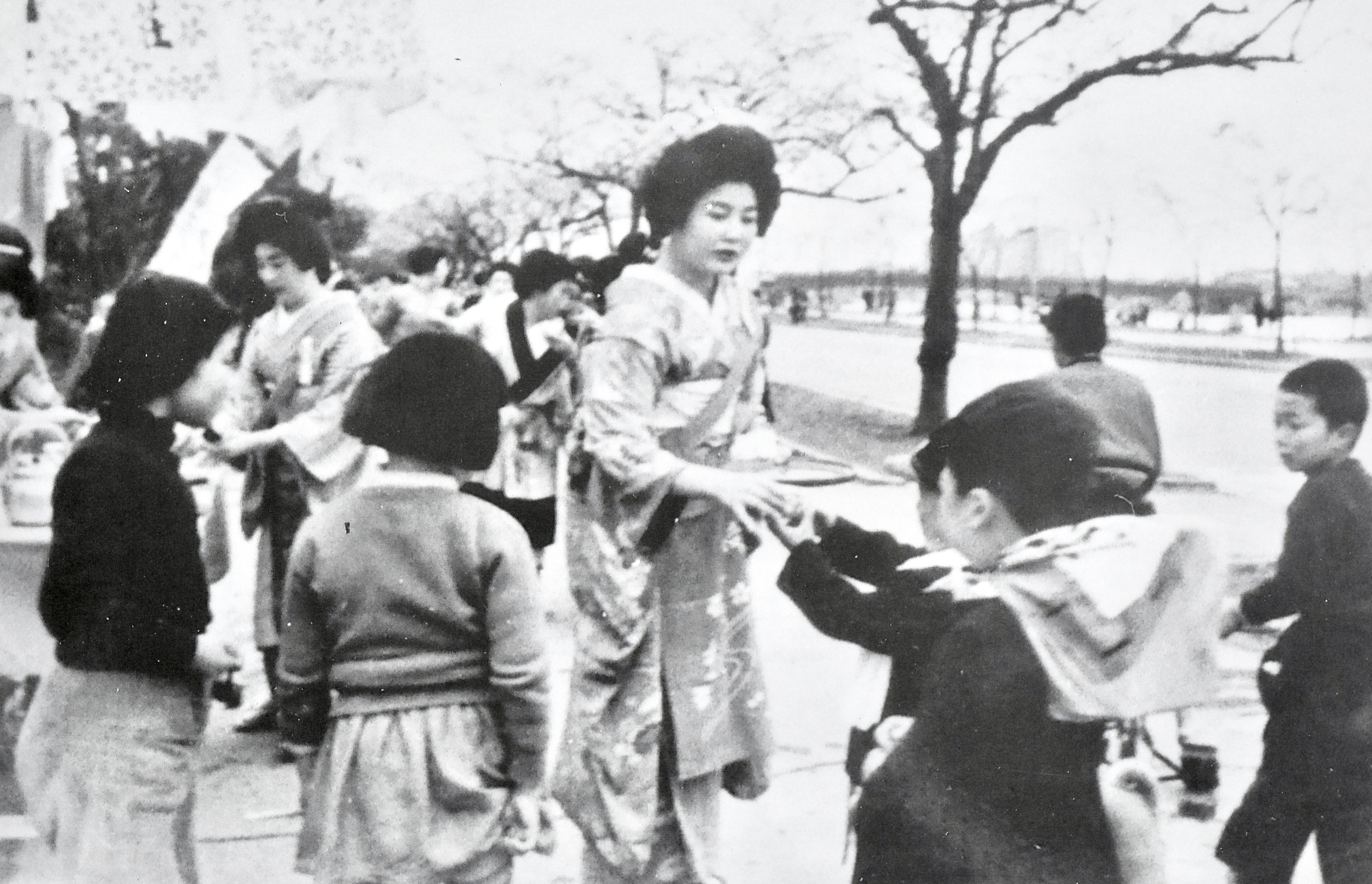
Geishas of Sumida serving tea to the hanami-goers, 1954

The teasing proverb dumplings rather than flowers (花より団子, hana yori dango) hints at the real priorities for most cherry blossom viewers, meaning that people are more interested in the food and drinks accompanying a hanami party than actually viewing the flowers themselves.

Dead bodies are buried under the cherry trees! is a popular saying about hanami, after the opening sentence of the 1925 short story "Under the Cherry Trees" by Motojirō Kajii.

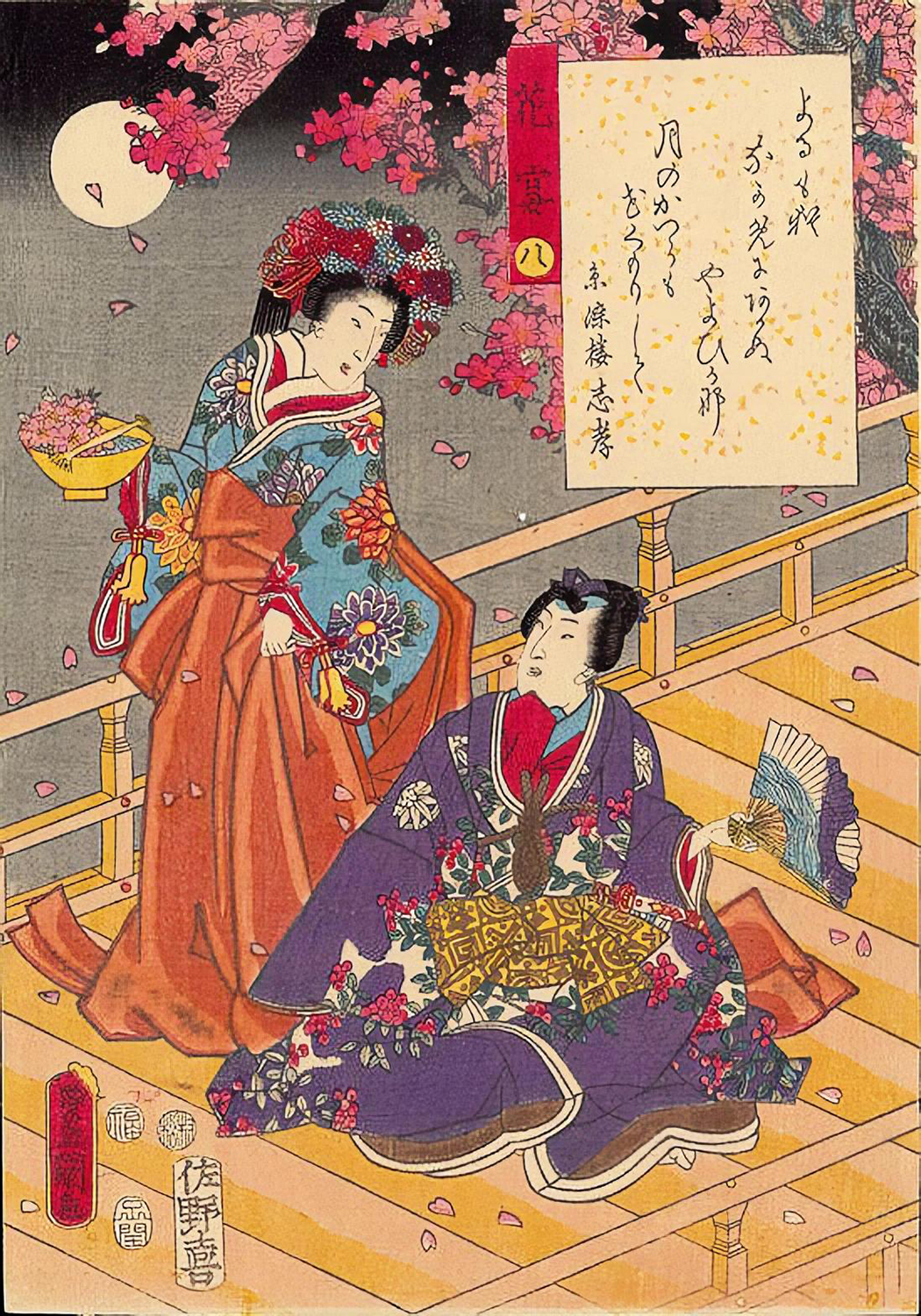
Ukiyo-e painting from The Tale of Genji, chapter 20 Hana no En, "Under the Cherry Blossoms", by artist Kunisada (1852)

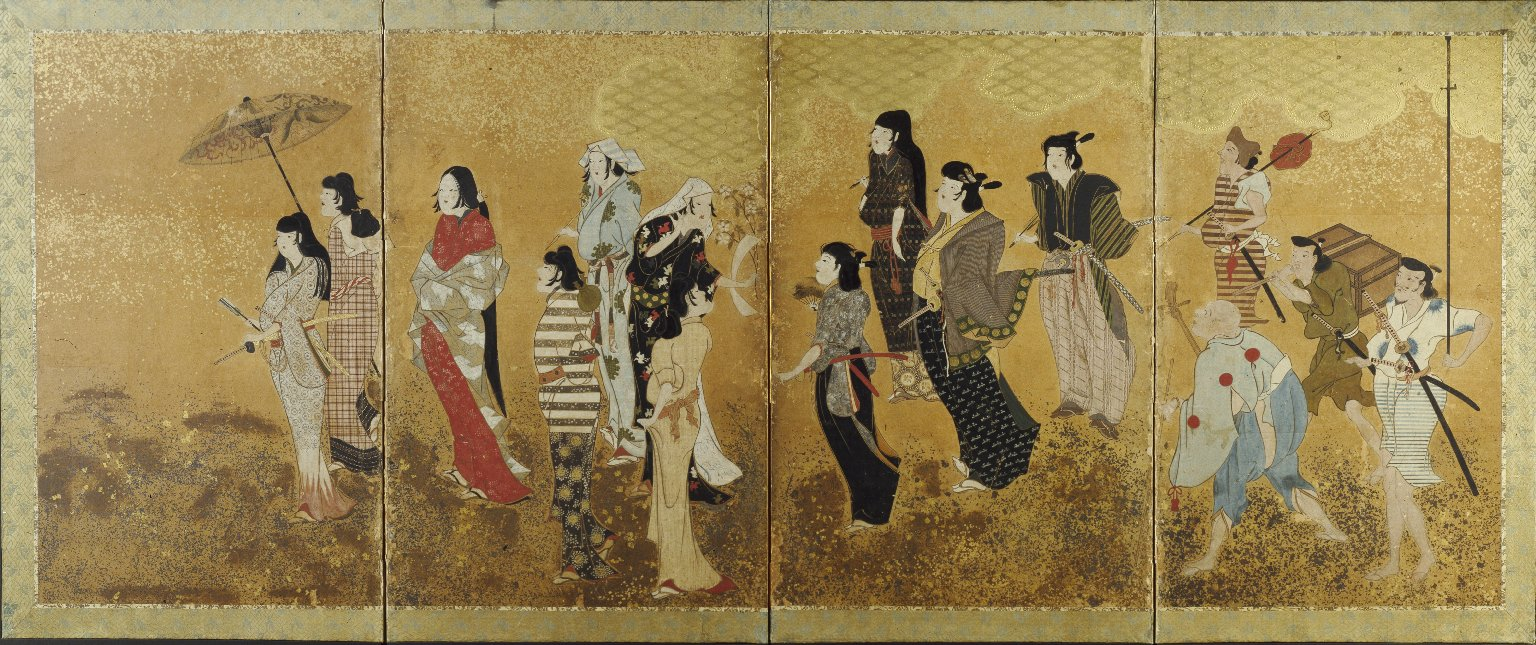
Cherry Blossom Viewing Picnic, c. 1624–1644. Edo period, Kan'ei Era. Ink, color and gold leaf on paper, Brooklyn Museum

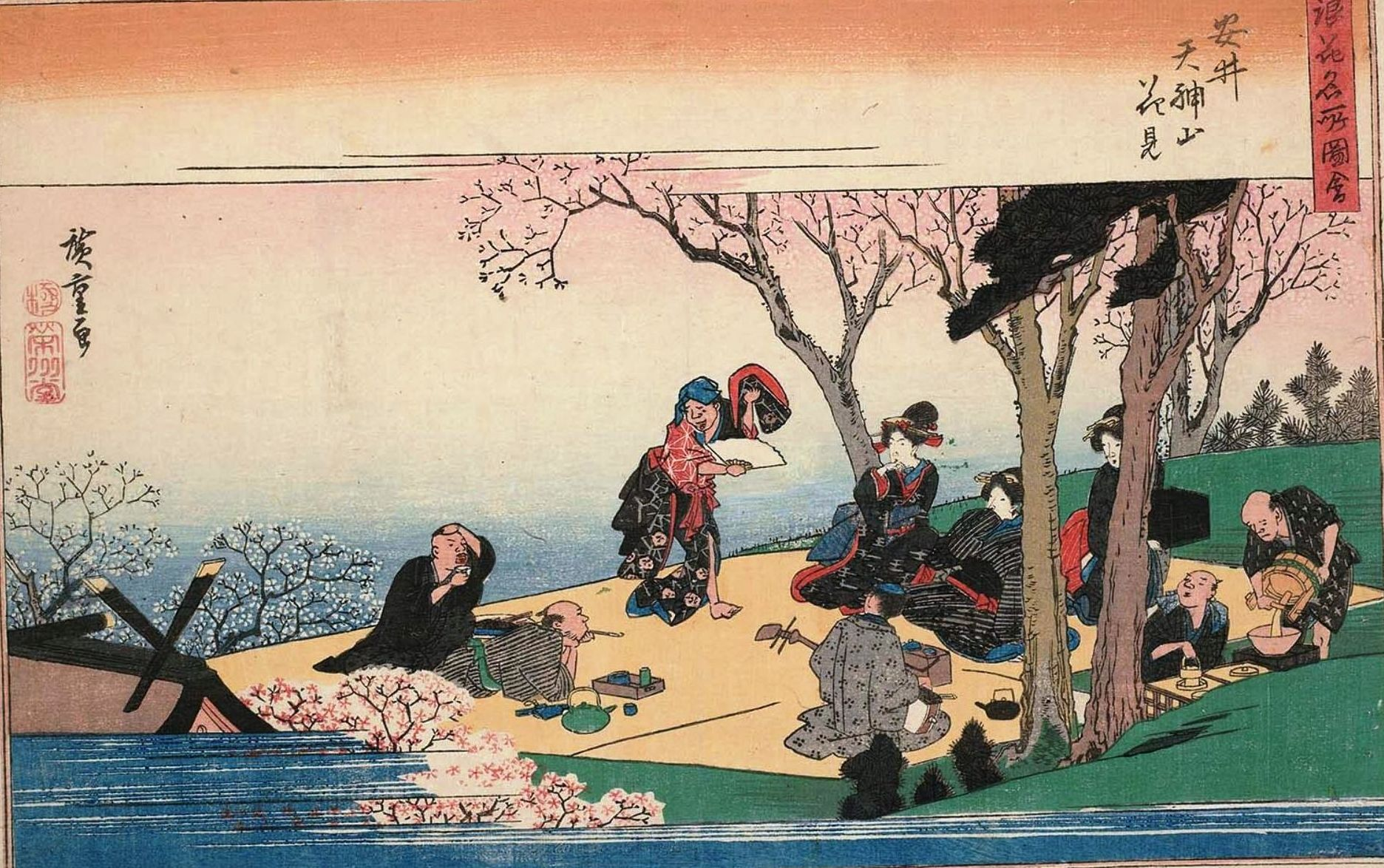
Hanami in Osaka. People enjoy viewing blossoms with dance, music, food and sake. The black box on the right is a multi-tiered bento box. Hiroshige (1834).

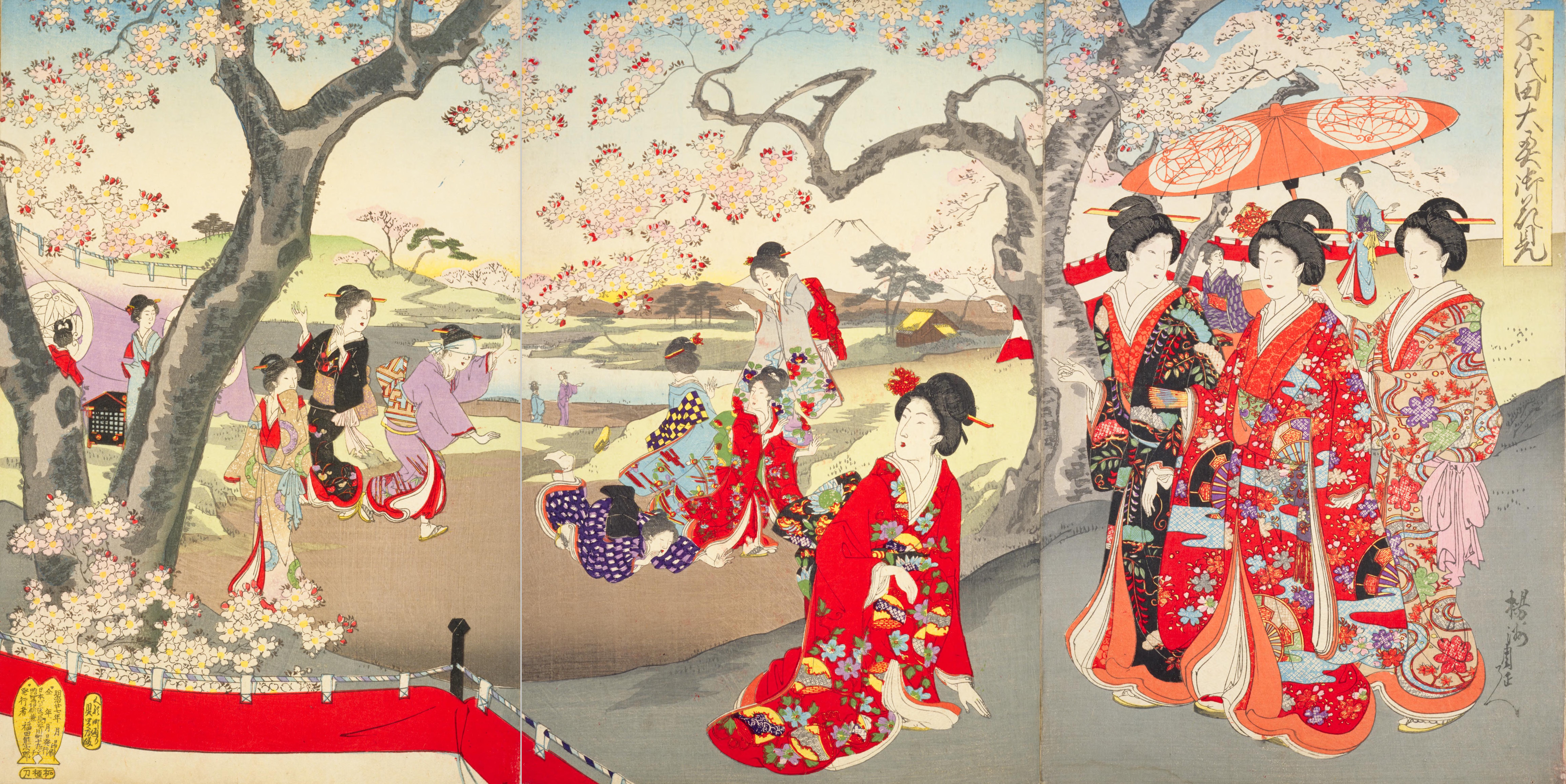
Ladies in the Edo palace enjoying cherry blossoms, Toyohara Chikanobu (1894)

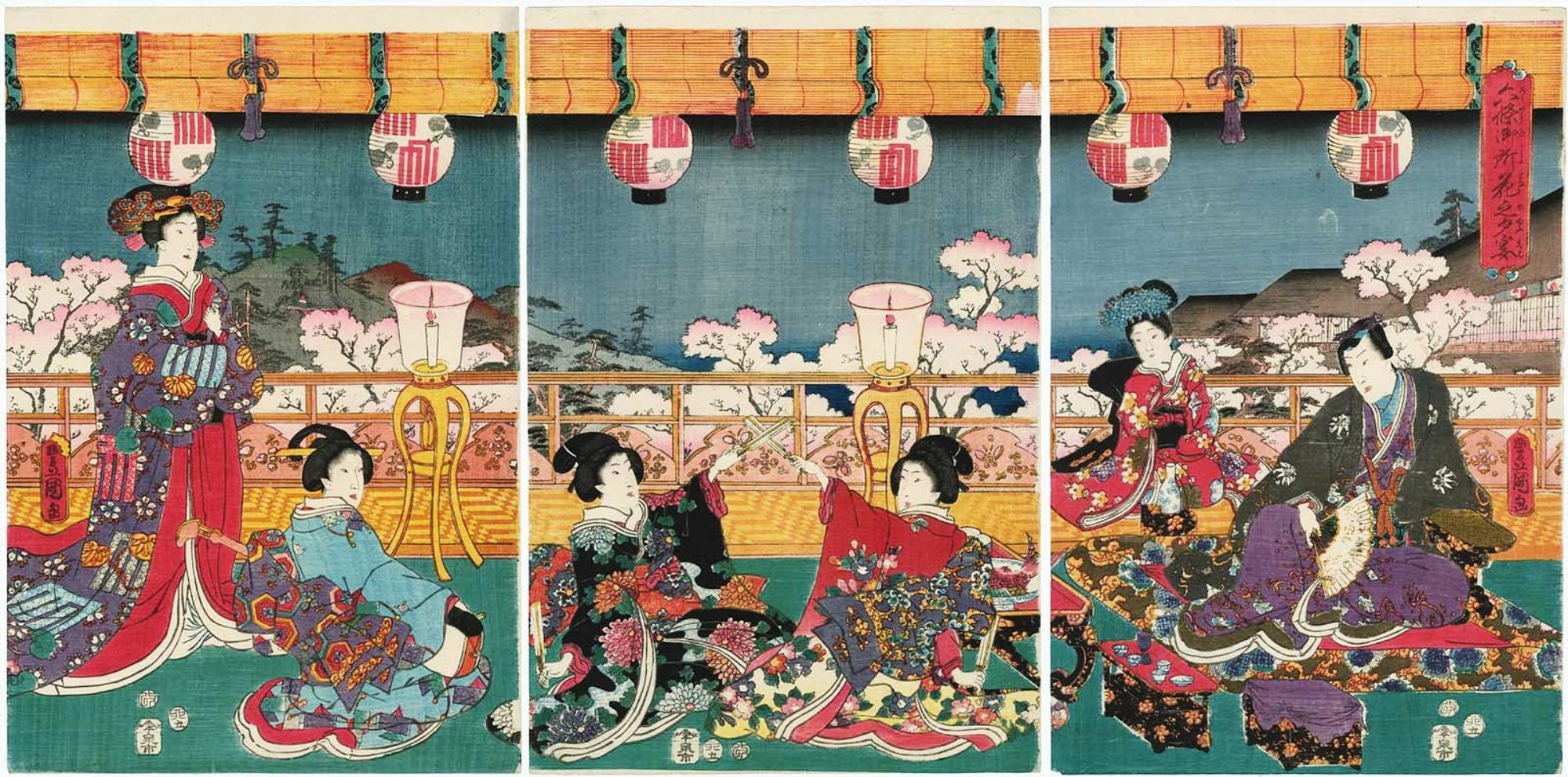
Evening Banquet for Cherry-blossom Viewing at the Rokujô Palace (Rokujô gosho hanami no yûen), by Kunisada (1855)

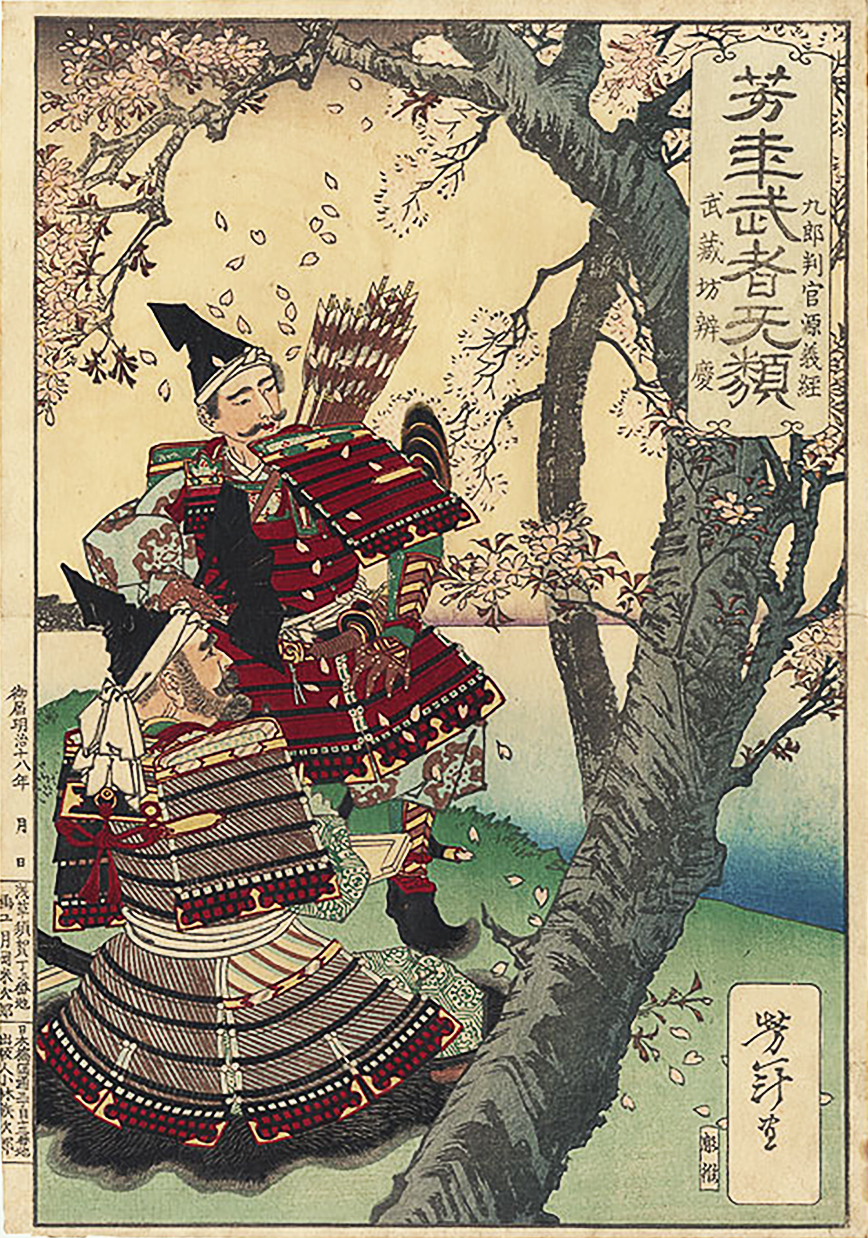
Woodblock print by Tsukioka Yoshitoshi, series "Courageous Warriors" ("Yoshitoshi musha burui"), Kurō Hangan Minamoto Yoshitsune and Musashibō Benkei under a cherry tree

== Hanami today ==
The Japanese people continue the tradition of hanami, gathering in great numbers wherever the flowering trees are found. Thousands of people fill the parks to hold feasts under the flowering trees, and sometimes these parties go on until late at night. In more than half of Japan, the cherry blossoming days come at the same time as the beginning of school and work after vacation, and so welcoming parties are often opened with hanami. Usually, people go to the parks to keep the best places to celebrate hanami with friends, family, and company coworkers many hours or even days before. In cities like Tokyo, it is also common to have celebrations under the sakura at night. Hanami at night is called yozakura (夜桜, "night sakura"). In many places such as Ueno Park, temporary paper lanterns are hung to have yozakura.

The cherry blossom front is forecast each year, previously by the Japan Meteorological Agency and now by private agencies, and is watched with attention by those who plan to celebrate hanami because the blossoms last for very little time, usually no more than two weeks. The first cherry blossoms happen in the subtropical southern islands of Okinawa, while on the northern island of Hokkaido they bloom much later. In most large cities like Tokyo, Kyoto and Osaka, the cherry blossom season normally takes place around the end of March and the beginning of April. The television and newspapers closely follow this cherry blossom front as it slowly moves from south to north. In 2018 blossoms were scheduled to open in Fukuoka on March 21, in Kyoto March 27, in Tokyo March 26 and Sapporo May 1. The hanami celebrations usually involve eating and drinking, and playing and listening to music. Some special dishes are prepared and eaten at the occasion, like dango and bento, and sake is commonly drunk as part of the festivity. In 2020, traditional cherry blossom season events were canceled and tourists did not come to Japan due to the COVID-19 pandemic. The 2021 peak bloom day in Kyoto, March 26, was the earliest since record-tracking began in 812. Peak blooms have been trending earlier since 1800, an example of season creep caused by climate change.

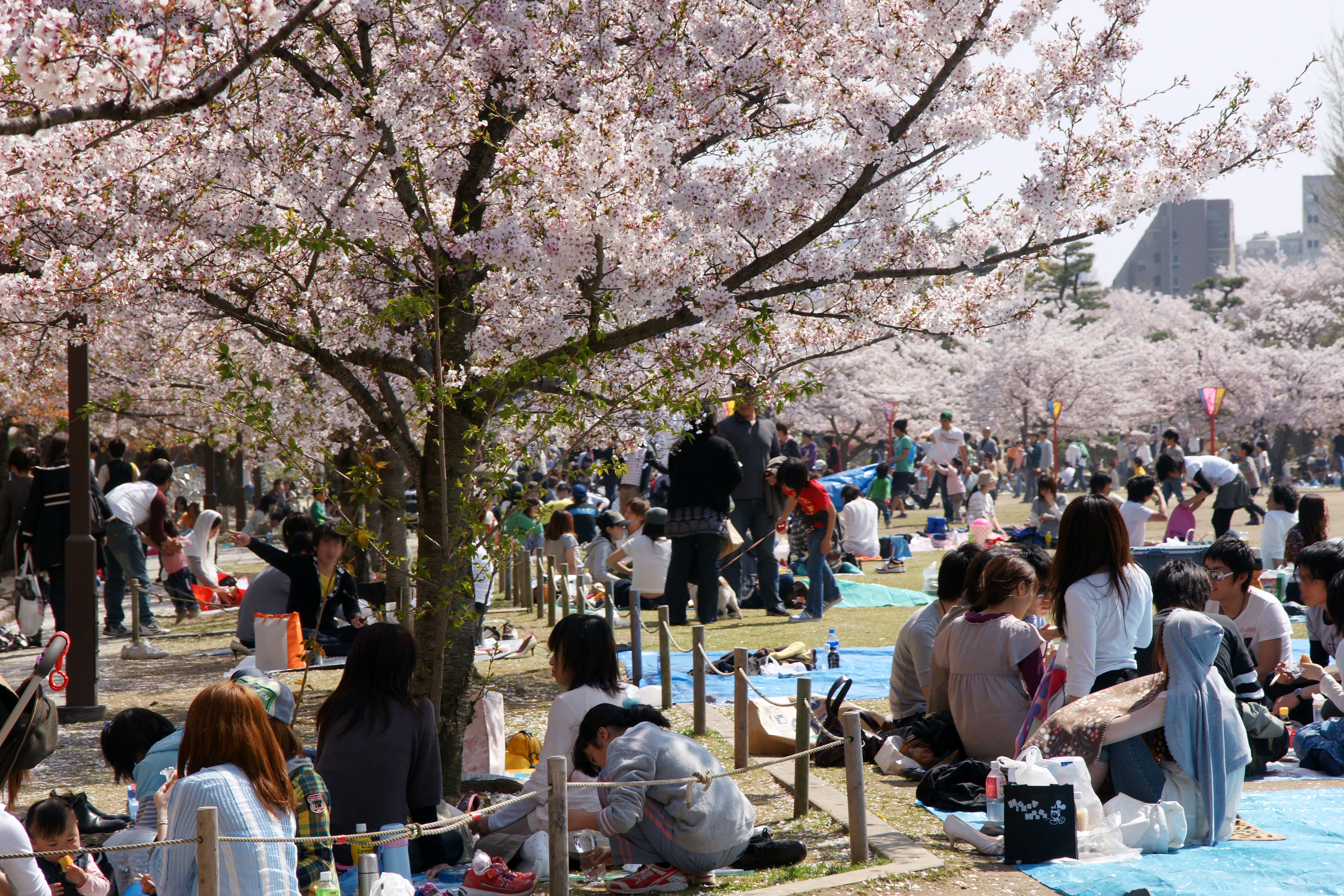
Cherry blossom viewing, Himeji Castle, 2009

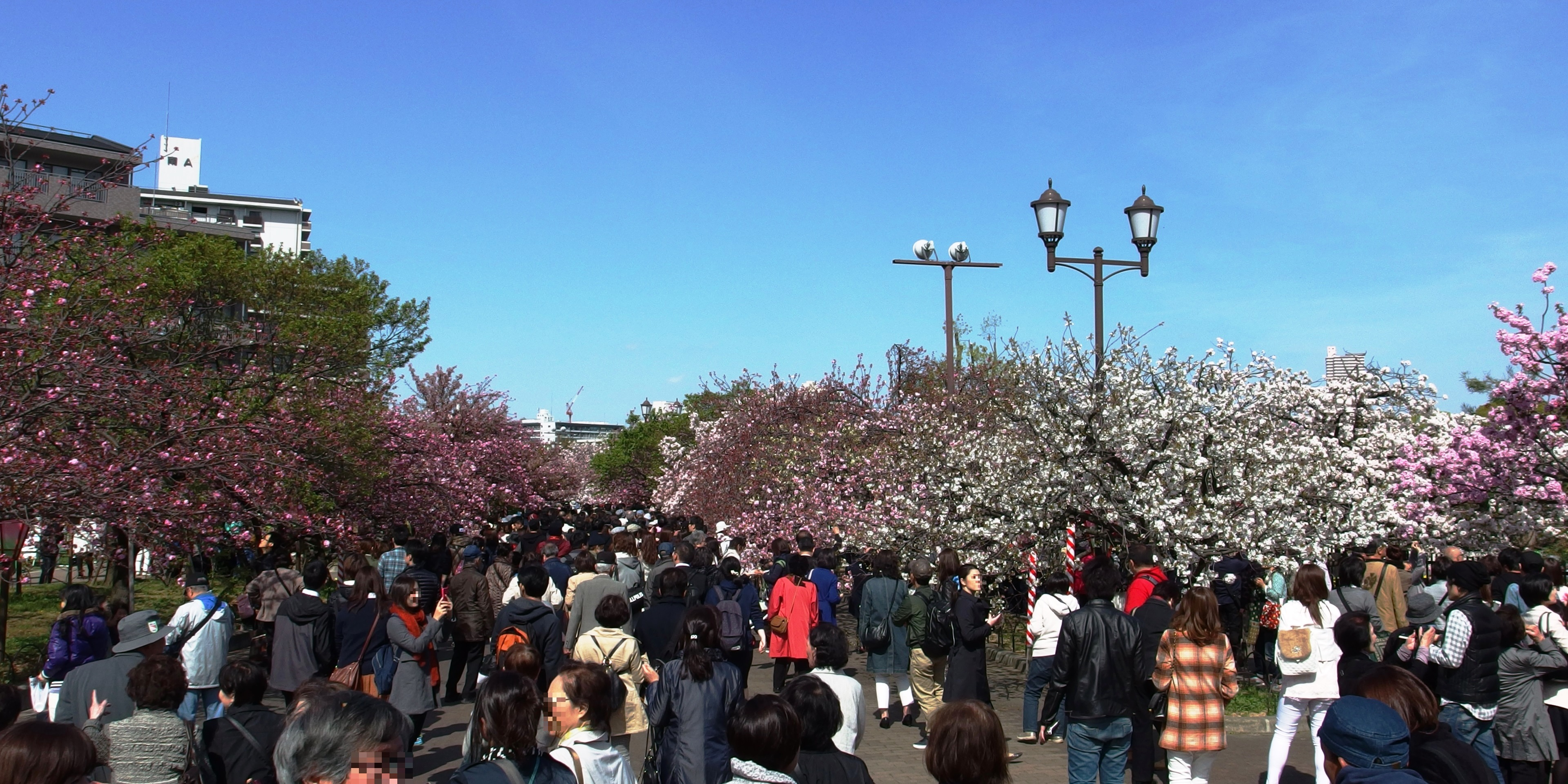
Hanami through the "Tunnel" at Japan Mint in Osaka, 2016

(video) Hanami picknickers in Bunkyō, 2015

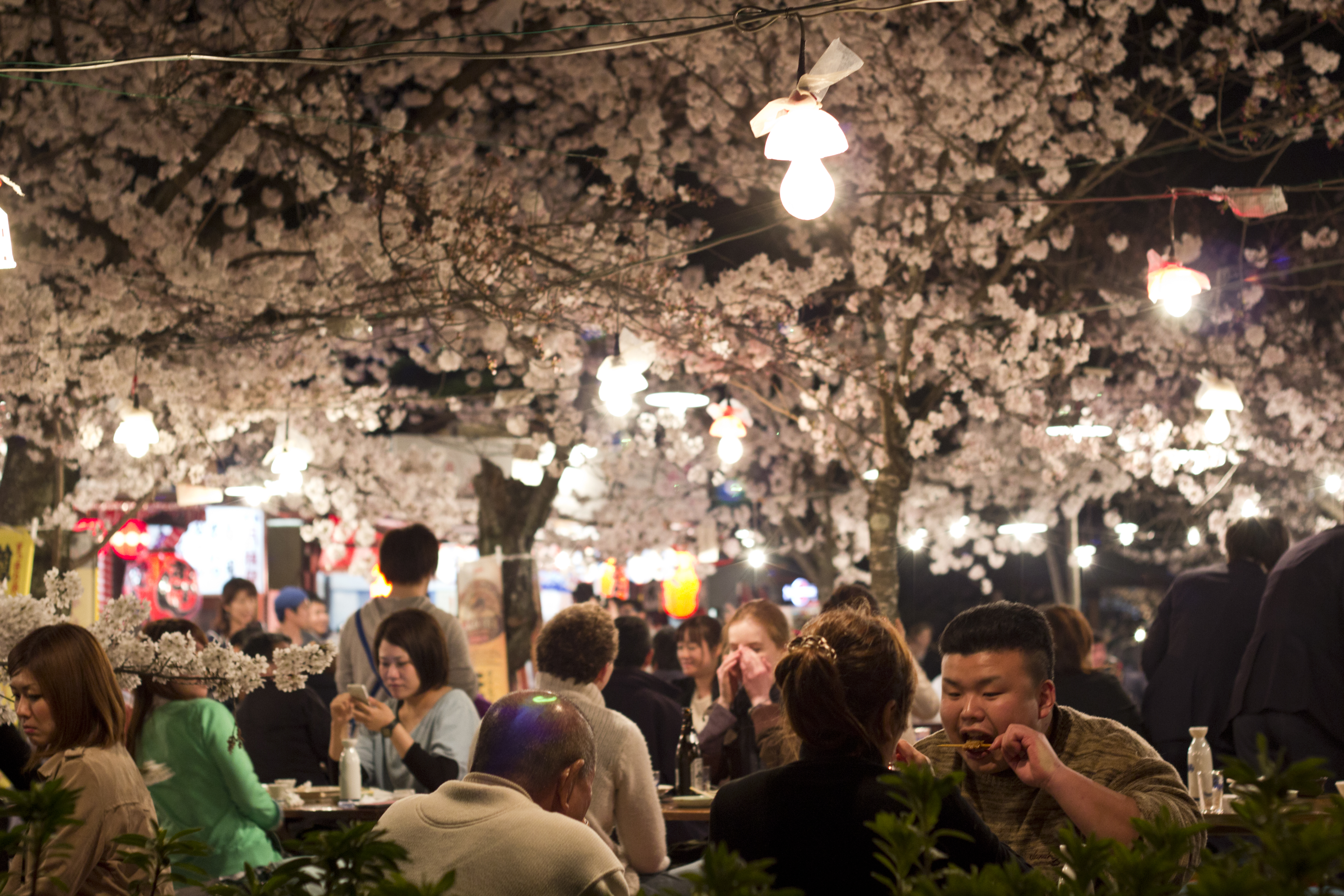
Hanami at Maruyama Park behind Yasaka Shrine in Kyoto, 2014

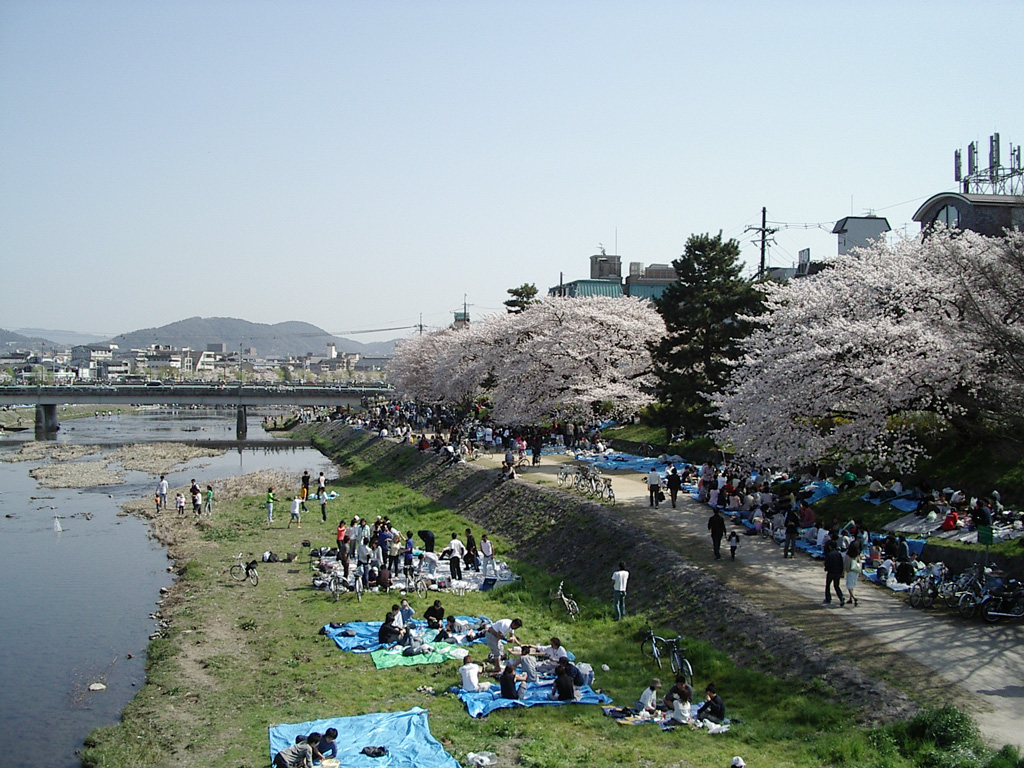
Hanami parties along the Kamo River, 2005

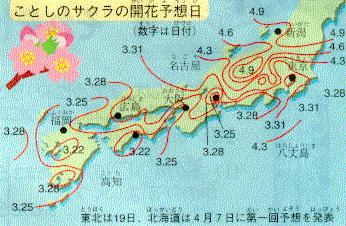
A blossom forecast for 2006, with the predicted dates of blossoms. The numbers are for dates (3.22 is March 22) and the "cherry blossom front" moves from south to north.

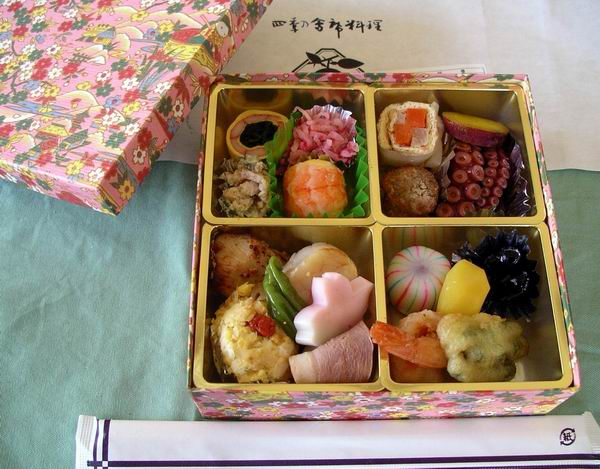
A colourful collection of sweet and savoury snacks to nibble on between sips of sake, while admiring the cherry blossoms

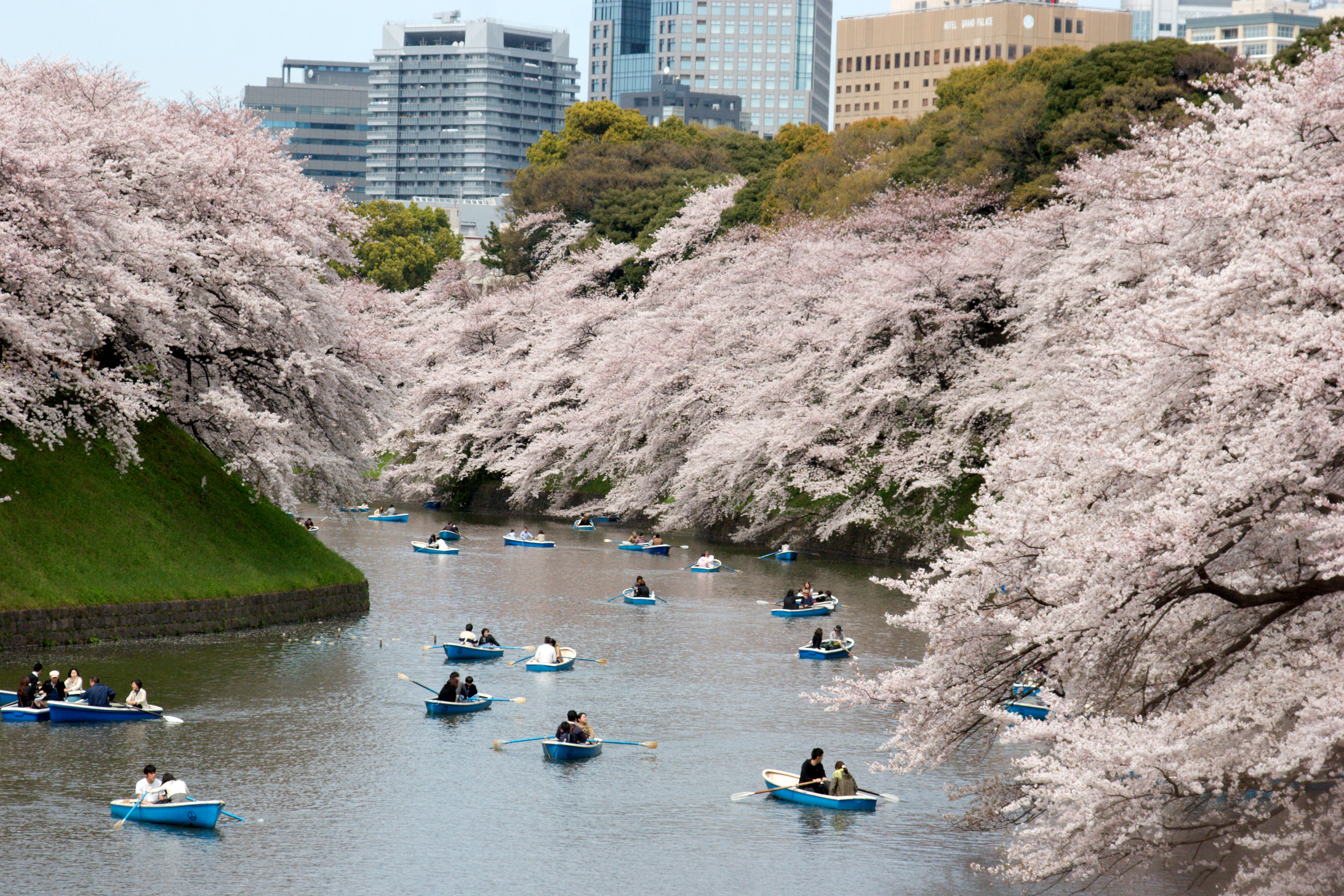
Chidorigafuchi, Tokyo

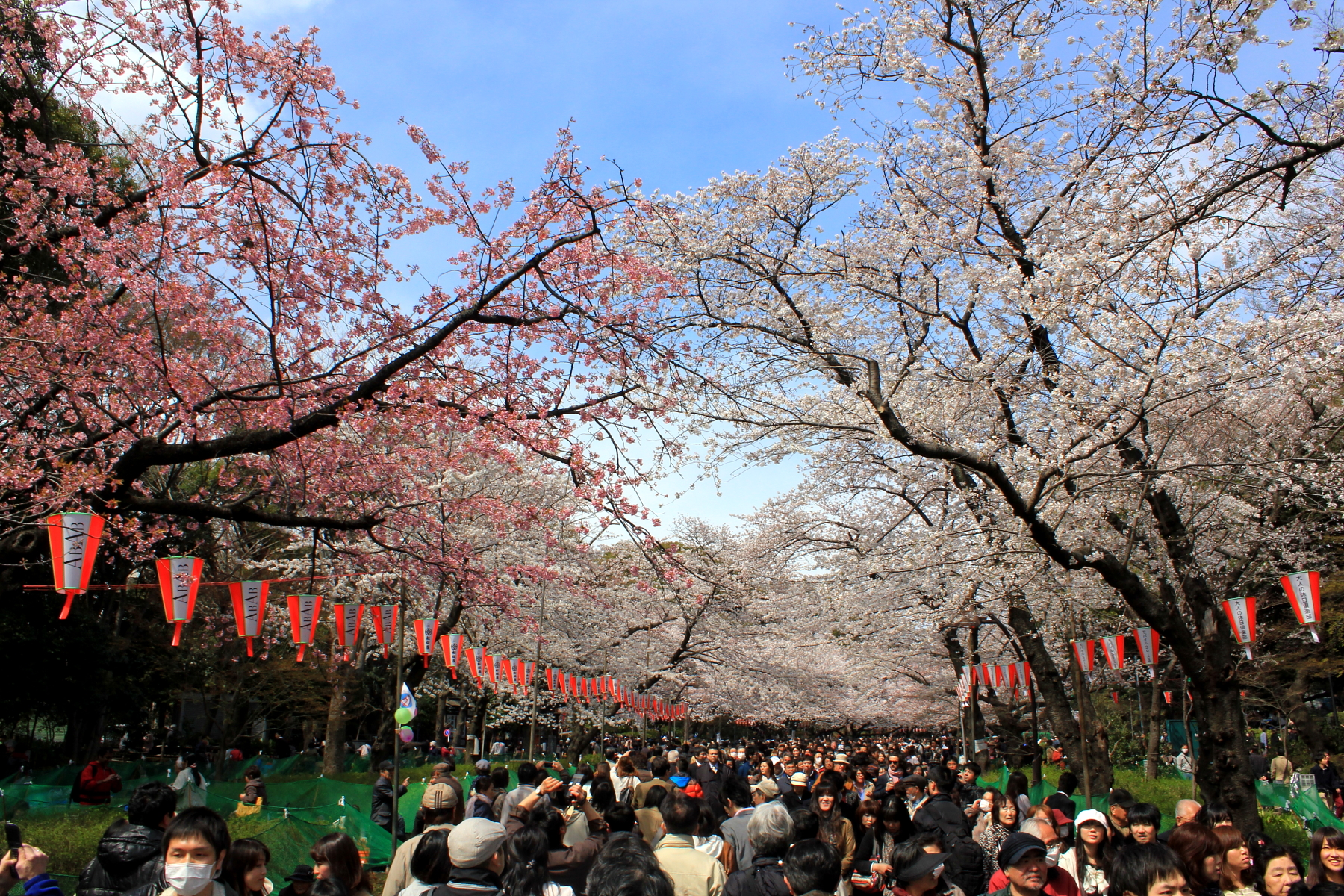
Hanami in Ueno Park

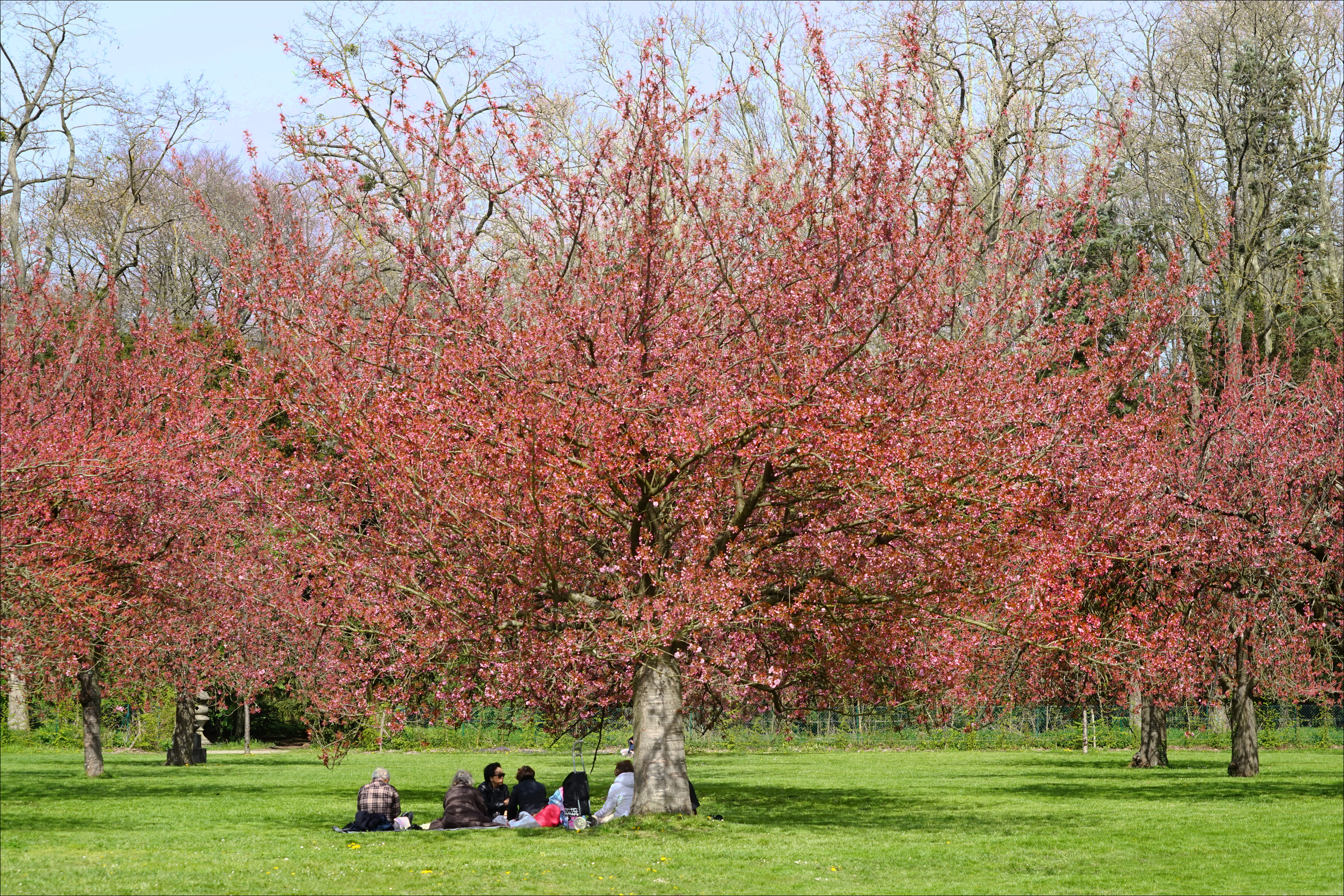
Hanami in Parc de Sceaux, Hauts-de-Seine

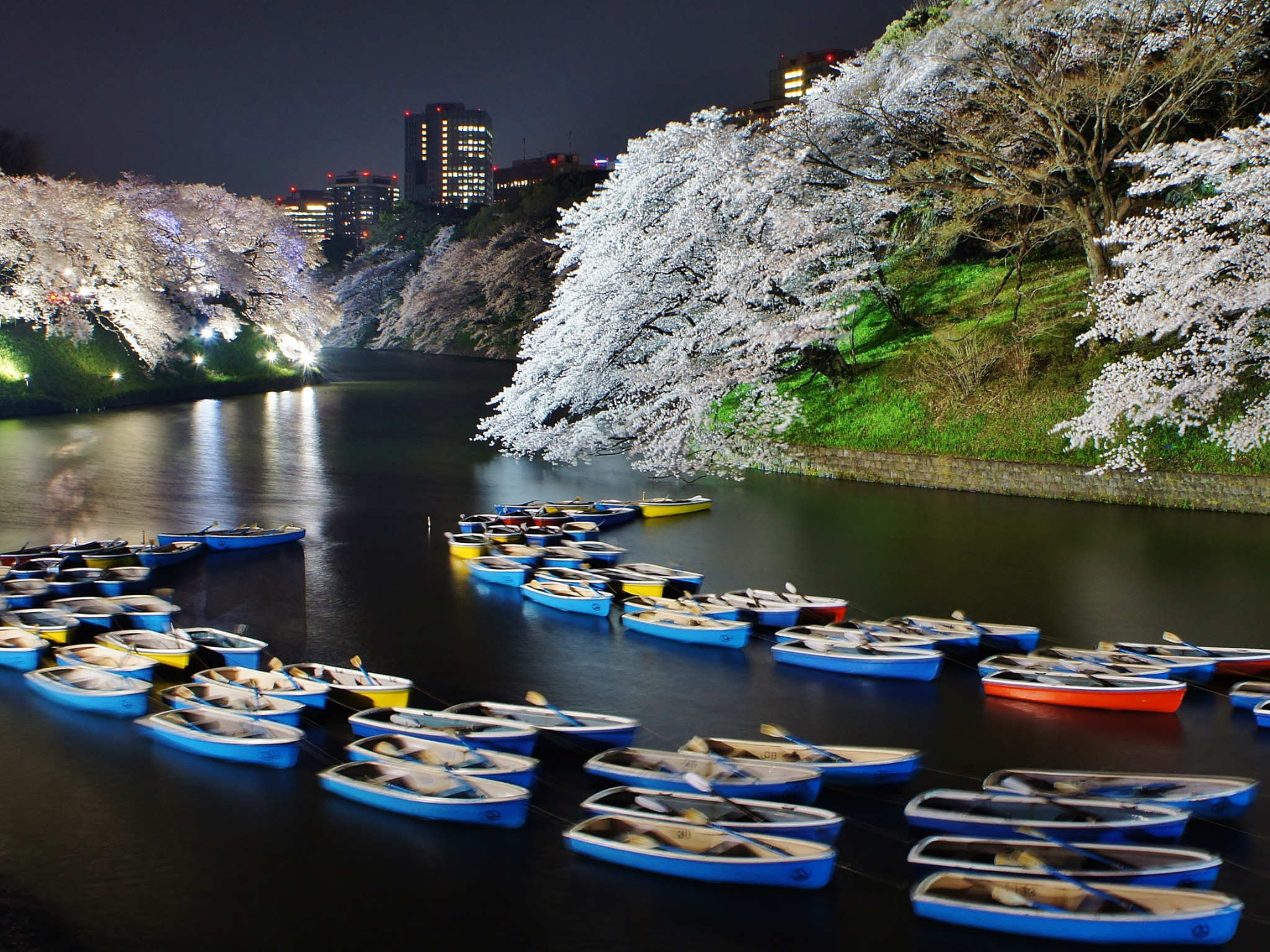
Chidorigafuchi Cherry Blossom Illuminations

== Outside Japan ==
Similar celebrations take place in Taiwan, Korea, the Philippines, and China.

=== North America ===
==== United States ====
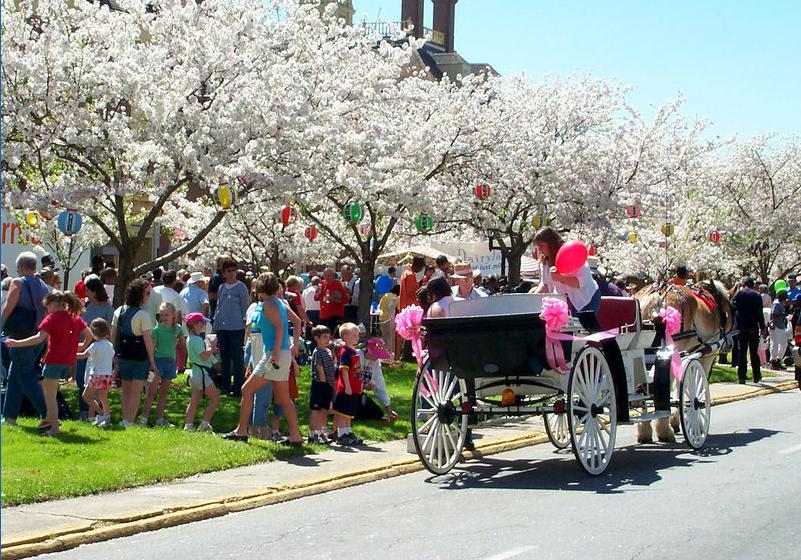
International Cherry Blossom Festival in Macon, Georgia, United States

In the United States, hanami has also become very popular. In 1912, Japan gave 3,000 sakura trees as a gift to the United States to celebrate the nations' friendship. These trees were planted in Washington, D.C., and another 3,800 trees were donated in 1965. These sakura trees continue to be a popular tourist attraction, and every year, the National Cherry Blossom Festival takes place when they bloom in early spring.

In Macon, Georgia, another cherry blossom festival called the International Cherry Blossom Festival is celebrated every spring. Macon is known as the Cherry Blossom Capital of the World, because 300,000 sakura trees grow there.

In Brooklyn, New York, the Annual Sakura Matsuri Cherry Blossom Festival takes place in May, at the Brooklyn Botanic Garden. This festivity has been celebrated since 1981, and is one of the Garden's most famous attractions. Similar celebrations are also held in Philadelphia and other places through the United States.

Another popular collection of sakura in the United States is in Newark, New Jersey's Branch Brook Park, whose over 5,000 cherry trees of 18 varieties attract 10,000 visitors a day during its annual Cherry Blossom Festival.

==== Canada ====
In Toronto, Canada the Hanami is celebrated in the many parks in the city in late April, due to the city's cold climate. Around 50 Yoshino Sakura trees have been donated to the city as symbols of international friendship and good will by the descendants of Japanese immigrants. High Park, the home of the most extensive cherry tree collection in the city, closes its streets to auto traffic to better allow for sakura viewing during the week of peak bloom.

Vancouver has over 40,000 cherry blossom trees of different varieties. Queen Elizabeth Park is a popular spot to view the cherry blossom trees.

=== Europe ===
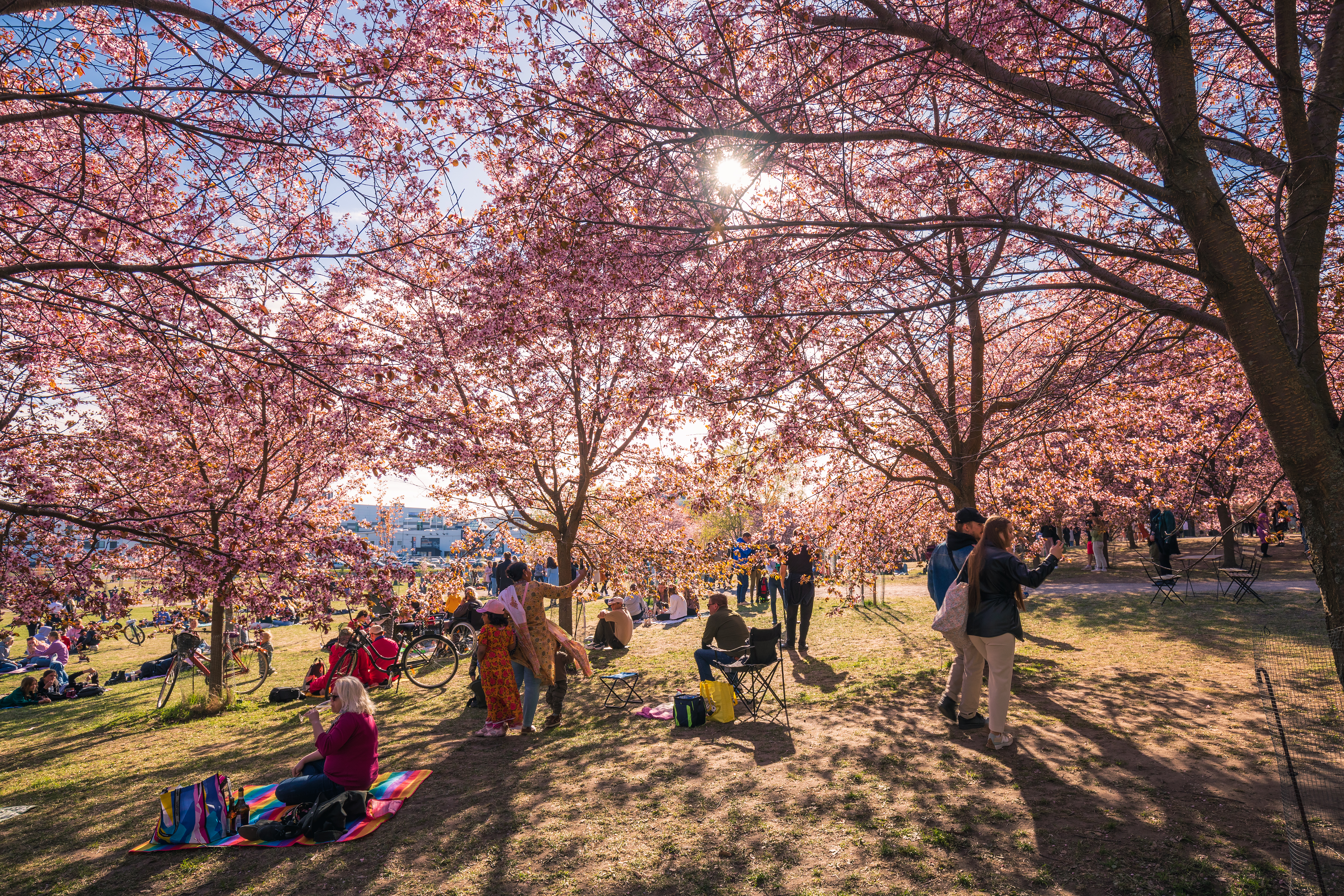
Cherry blossom at Kirsikkapuisto in Helsinki, Finland

Hanami is also celebrated in several European countries. For example, in Finland people gather to celebrate hanami in Helsinki at Roihuvuori. Local Japanese people and companies have donated 200 cherry trees which are all planted in Kirsikkapuisto. Those cherry trees usually bloom in mid-May.

In Rome, in Italy, the hanami is celebrated, where are a lot of cherry trees were donated by Japan in 1959.

In Stockholm there is an annual festivity in Kungsträdgården where a lot of people celebrate hanami.

Paris has several stunning displays of cherry blossom trees in the Trocadero Garden, Jardin des Plantes, Parc de Sceaux, and many other spots.

During the COVID-19 pandemic in England, the National Trust initiated the #BlossomWatch campaign, which was inspired by Japanese cherry blossom festivals. It encouraged people to share images of first flowers on their lockdown walks.

== See also ==
- Sakuramochi
- Sakurayu
- Sakura cheese
- Hana wa sakuragi, hito wa bushi
- Momijigari, autumn leaf viewing
- Tsukimi, moon viewing
- Fuji Matsuri
- Prunus
- Cherry Tree Park
- Subaru Cherry Blossom Festival of Greater Philadelphia
- List of Award of Garden Merit flowering cherries
