= Sakura cheese =

Soft cheese created and produced by Kyodo Gakusha Shintoku Farm, in Hokkaidō, Japan

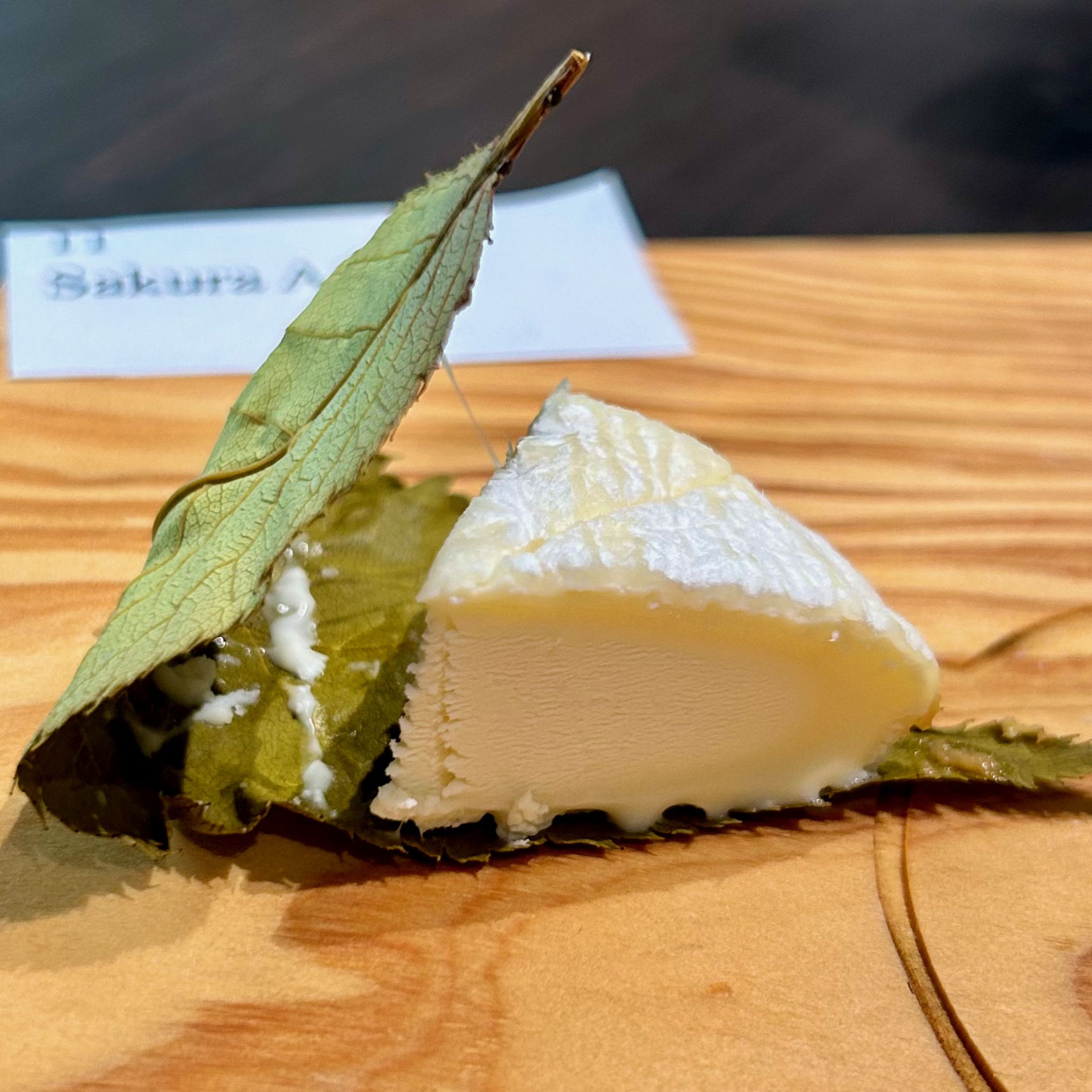
- Country of origin: Japan

Sakura cheese (Sakura Chīzu (桜チーズ; literally "Sakura (Cherry Blossom) Cheese")) is a soft cheese created and produced by Kyodo Gakusha Shintoku Farm, in Hokkaidō, Japan.

== Features ==
Sakura Cheese is a camembert style that is washed in local sake, Yachi Yanagi (ヤチヤナギ), dusted with locally harvested Dutch myrtle, and Sasayuki (笹雪) and wrapped in bamboo leaf picked on the producer's farm. The Japanese word 'Sakura' means "cherry blossom" in English, and is widely recognized as an important symbol of Japan and Japanese culture.

== Production ==
Kyodo Gakusha Shintoku Farm, the Hokkaido dairy that produces Sakura Cheese, was founded by Shinichiro Miyajima, in 1974. The farm also makes Shintoko, a seasonally produced, multi-award-winning Gruyère-type cheese that is aged for over 10 months for a rich, complex flavor. The farm is currently run by Miyajima's son, Nozomu Miyajima, an award-winning cheesemaker who trained in dairy science at the University of Wisconsin-Madison. Miyajima attributes his cheesemaking success in large part to his farm's volcanic soils and naturally filtered waters.

== Cheese in Japan ==
Cheese production and consumption in Japan is a modern phenomenon and was not part of the culinary tradition of Japan. In 1900 the per-capita annual consumption of cheese in Japan was only 0.9g. Japan's consumption and production however increased significantly after World War II and is now the world's third biggest importer of cheese. Sakura Cheese is a further milestone in the country's growing appreciation of cheese by becoming the first internationally acclaimed cheese originating from Japan, winning a gold medal in the soft cheese category at the Mountain Cheese Olympics in Appenzell, Switzerland. This was a rare honor for a non-European produced cheese with awards traditionally going to Swiss, Italian, or French cheeses.

== See also ==
- Sakuramochi
- Sakurayu
- List of cheeses
