= Sakurayu =

Japanese infusion created by steeping pickled cherry blossoms

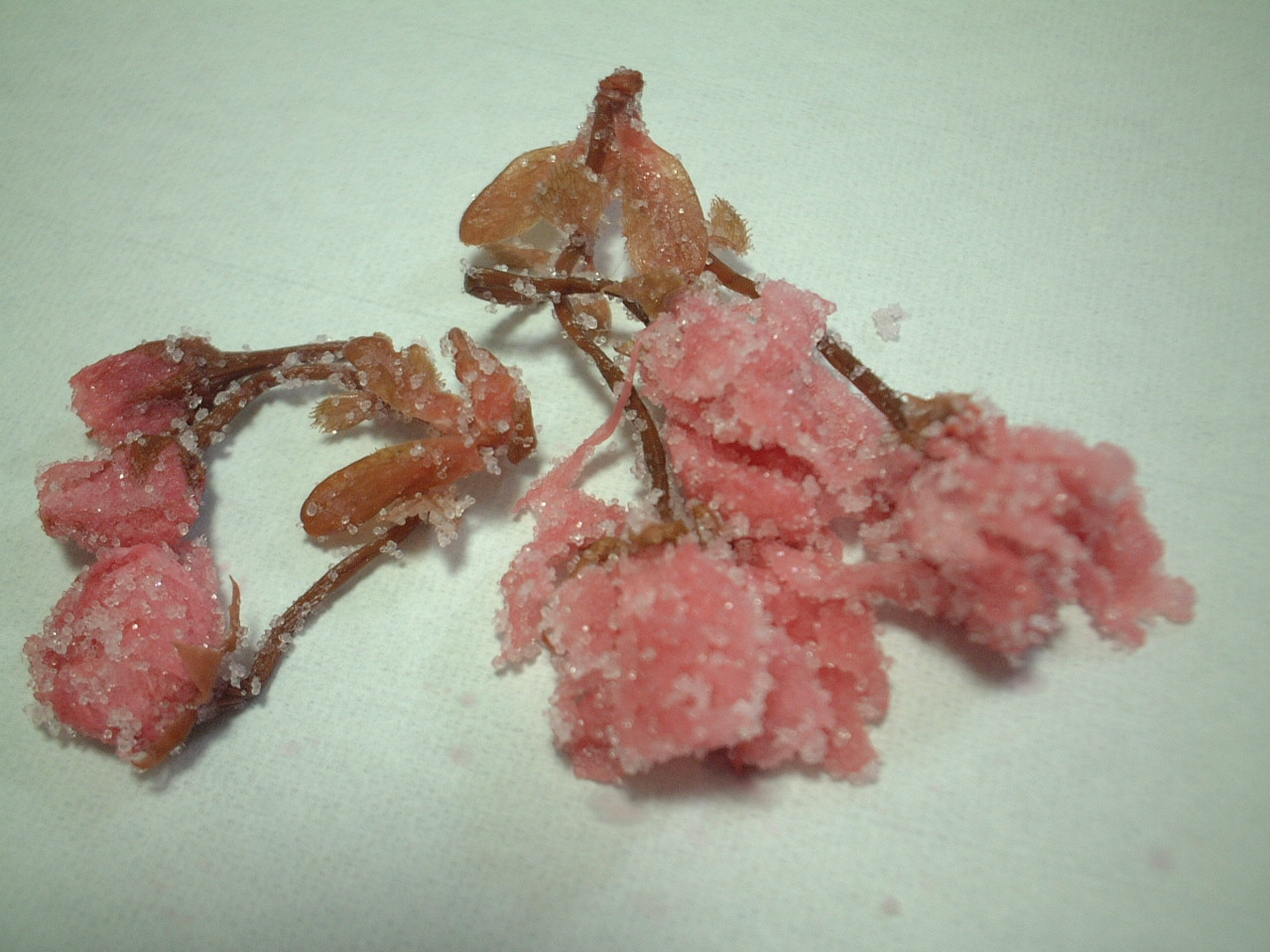
Pickled blossoms

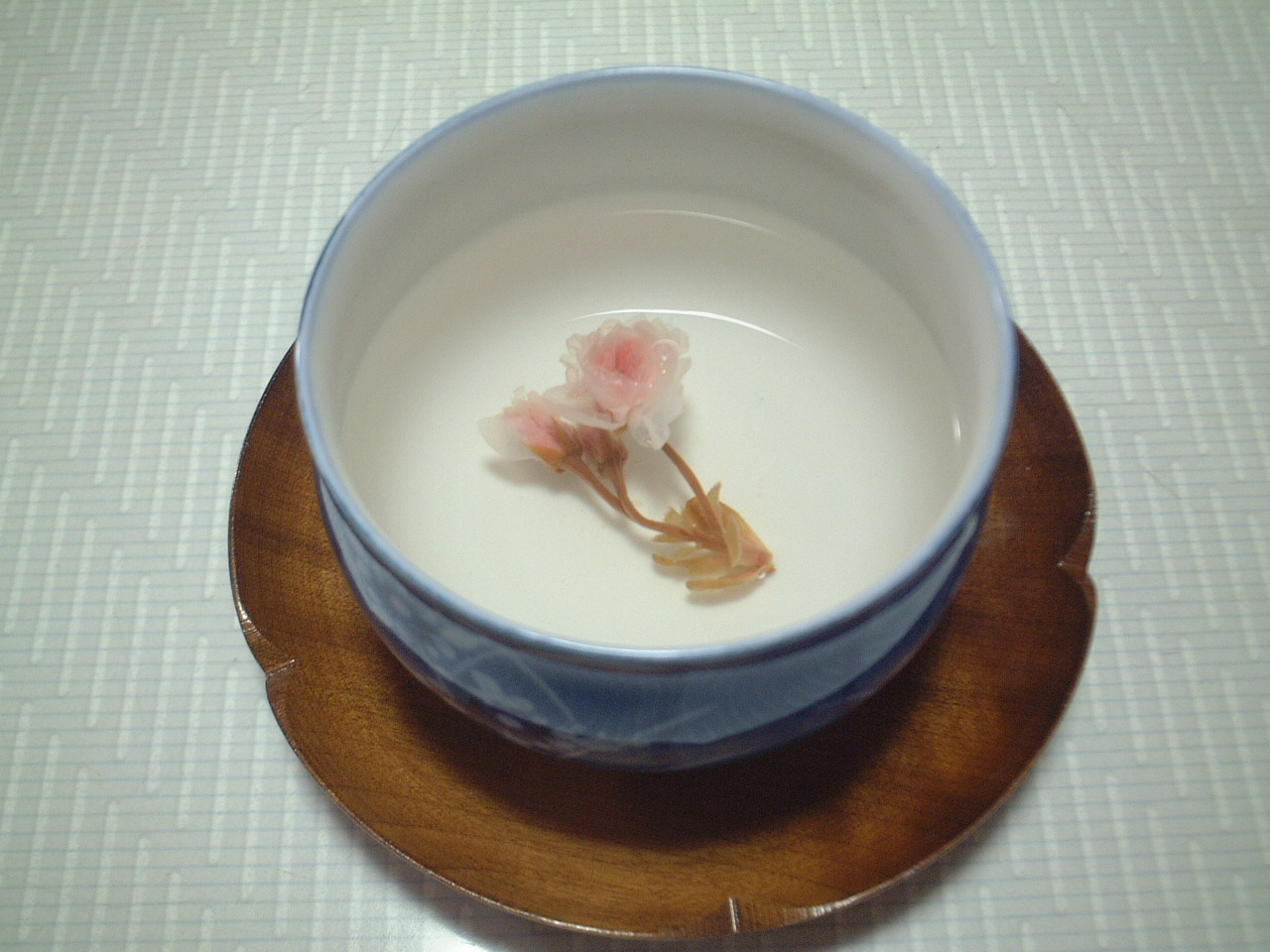
A cup of sakurayu

Sakurayu (Japanese: 桜湯) or Sakura-cha (桜茶), literally "cherry blossom tea", is a Japanese infusion created by steeping pickled cherry blossoms with boiled water. This combination becomes a type of herbal tea, and has been enjoyed in East Asian culture for many generations.

== Preparation ==
The main ingredient, cherry blossom petals, are harvested when the cherry trees bloom from mid to late spring. After the calyxes are removed, the petals are then pickled in plum vinegar and salt and the product subsequently dried. The dried cherry blossoms are then stored or sealed in tea packets and sold.

In order to produce sakurayu, a few such dried, salt-pickled blossoms must be sprinkled into a cup of hot water. Once covered in hot water, the collapsed petals unfurl and float. The herbal tea is then allowed to steep until the flavor reaches its desired intensity. The resulting drink tastes slightly salty. The tea is a very light slightly sweet brew.

== Serving ==
There is a Japanese expression, "ocha o nigosu" (お茶を濁す). In this phrase, "ocha" means tea, and "nigosu" means to make unclear. So the term itself will literally translate to to make the tea cloudy. However, the meaning of this expression is to "be evasive," "be vague," or "non-committal." This denotation is why green tea is not served at weddings, but "Sakura-yu" is served, as it represents "beginning," which is most appropriate for a wedding.

== See also ==
- Sakuramochi
- Sakura cheese
- Cherry blossom
- Hanami
- Kuzuyu
