= Sakuramochi =

Japanese confection

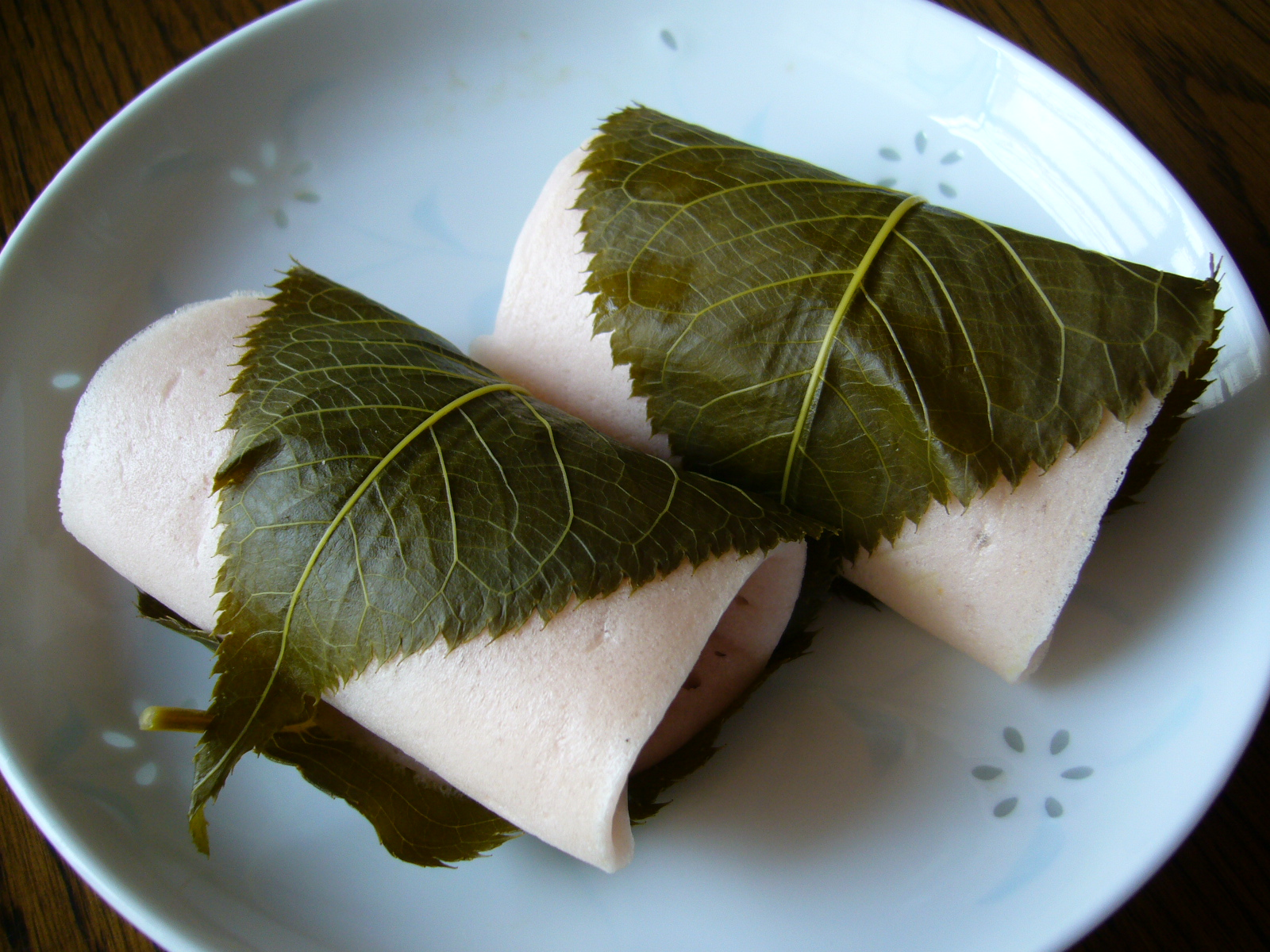
- Sakuramochi (Kanto-style)
- Place of origin: Japan
- Main ingredients: Sweet pink-colored rice cake, red bean paste, pickled cherry blossom leaf
- Other information: Traditionally consumed on Hinamatsuri and at Hanami

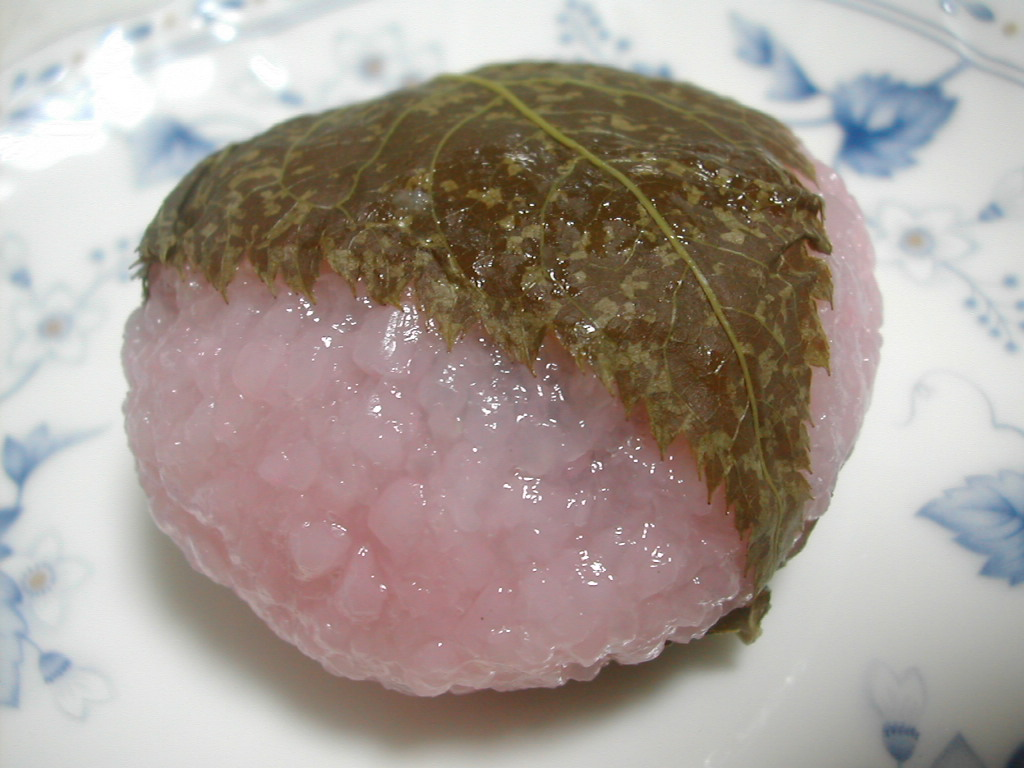
Kansai-style sakuramochi

Sakuramochi (桜餅) is a Japanese confection (wagashi) consisting of sweet, pink-colored rice cake (mochi) with red bean paste (anko) filling, wrapped in a pickled cherry blossom (sakura) leaf, which may or may not be eaten depending on individual preference.

Traditionally, the sweet is eaten during the spring season, especially at the annual Hinamatsuri celebration on March 3 and flower viewing (hanami) parties.

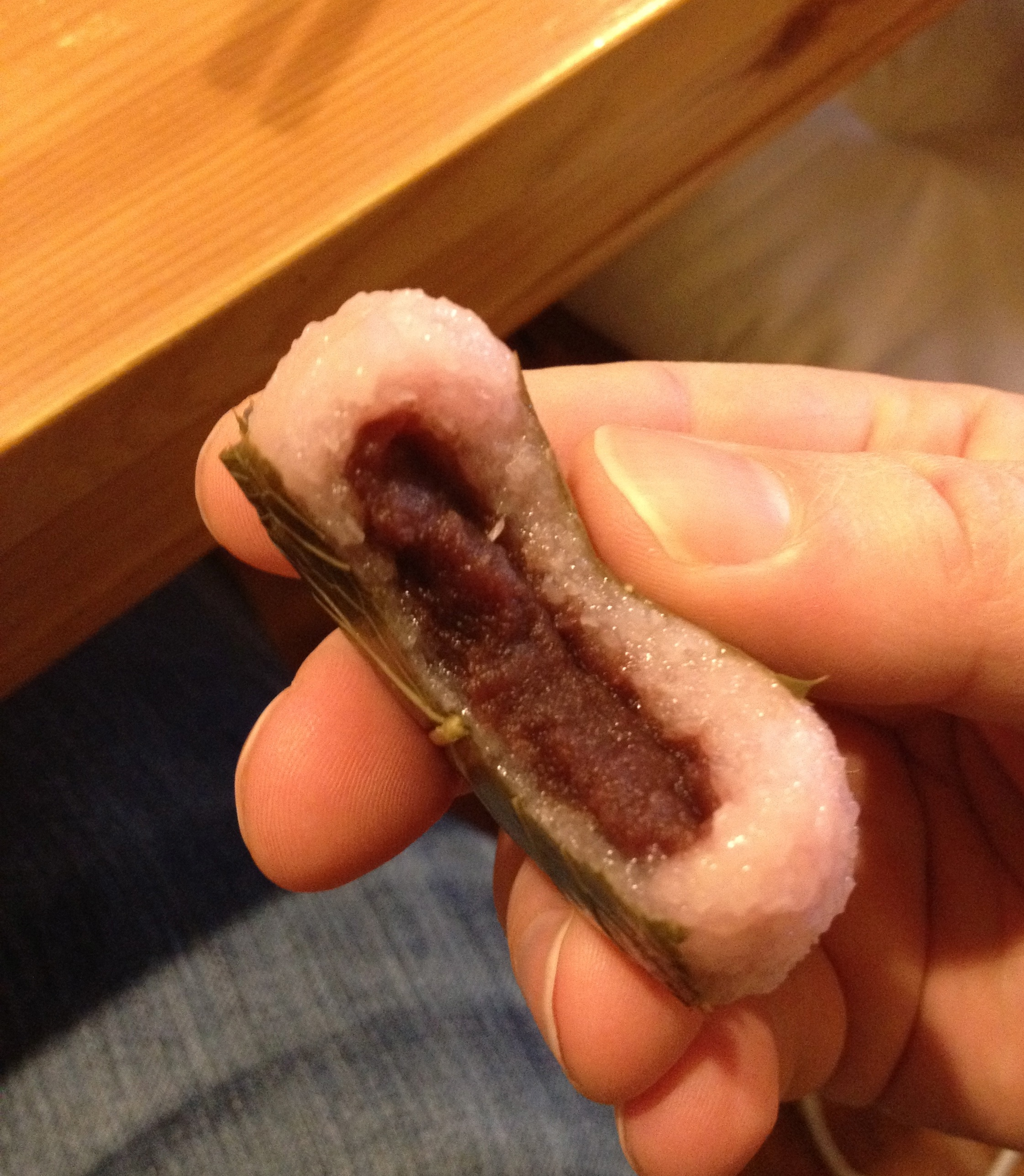
The interior of a sakuramochi, showing the red-bean paste inside

== History ==
The invention of sakuramochi is traditionally attributed to the Mukōjima neighborhood of Edo (today Tokyo) in the second year of the Kyōhō era (1717 AD), when Shinroku Yamamoto, who had worked as a gatekeeper at Chōmei-ji Temple since 1691, established a teahouse named Yamamoto-ya in front of the temple.

Originally meant for those visiting their family graves in the Chōmei-ji cemetery, the sweet was wrapped in cherry blossom leaves Yamamoto collected while cleaning up the temple grounds. The sweet grew popular among the crowds of hanami-goers, many of whom were attracted by the cherry blossom trees planted along the Sumida River by the order of the shōgun Tokugawa Yoshimune.

Yamamoto-ya remains in business to this day and is often simply referred to as Chōmeiji. Available all year, its sakuramochi is made from wheat flour, adzuki from Hokkaido, and Oshima cherry leaves from Matsuzaki, Shizuoka, using a recipe largely unchanged since the Edo period.

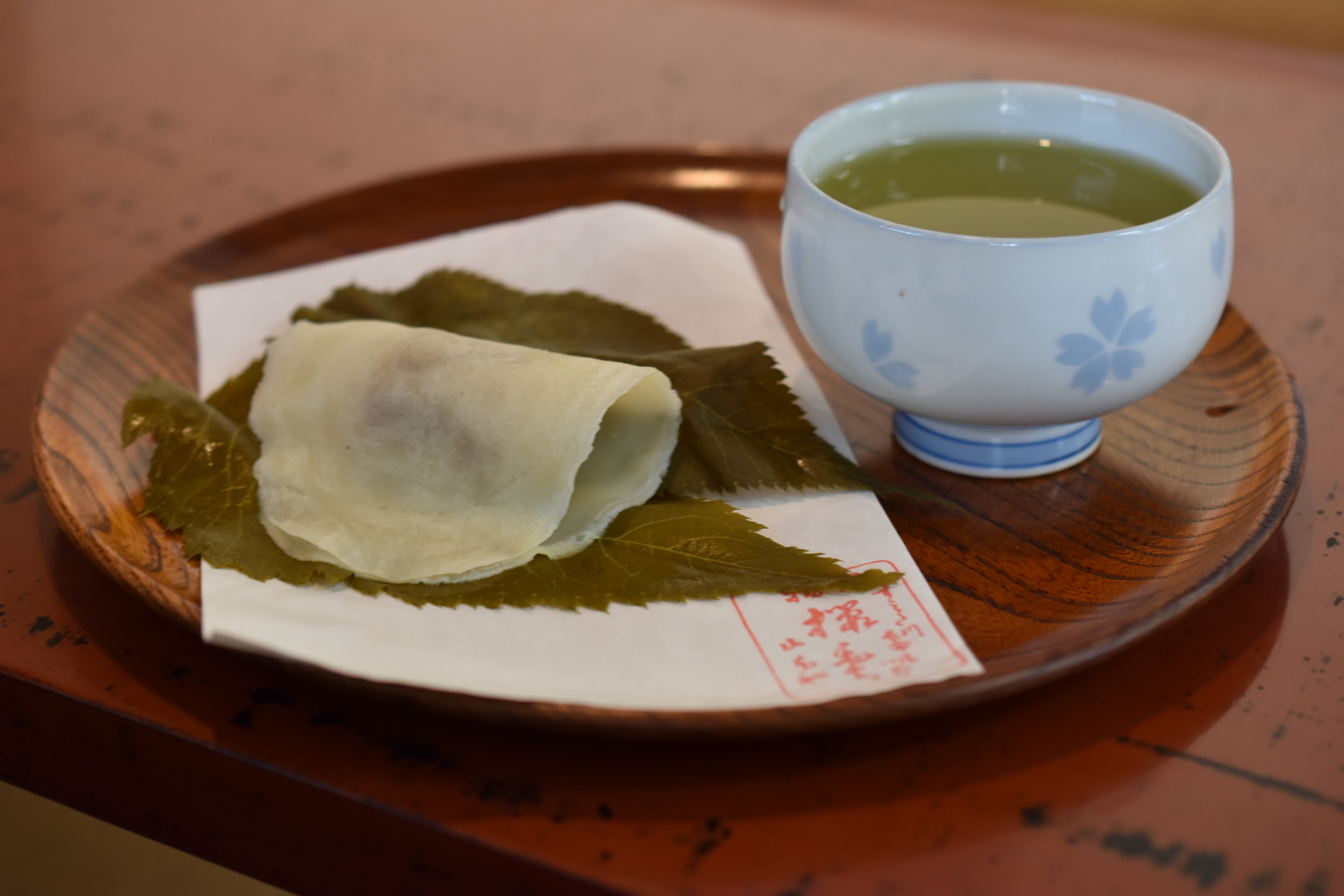
Sakuramochi at Yamamoto-ya, also known simply as Chōmeiji.

== Types ==
There are two major types of sakuramochi: Chōmeiji and Dōmyōji. Though their origins are regional, both types are often available at wagashi shops and supermarkets.

Kanto style
Sakuramochi common in the Kantō region, particularly in Tokyo, also known as Chōmeiji-mochi. This type is a kind of crêpe made from shiratama-ko (glutinous rice flour), though the original sakuramochi at Chōmeiji Yamamoto-ya uses wheat flour.
Kansai style
Sakuramochi common in the Kansai region, also referred to as Dōmyōji-mochi after the Buddhist temple in Osaka where its nuns made the famous Dōmyōji-hoshii (dried glutinous rice). It is somewhat similar to ohagi.

== See also ==
- Sakurayu
- Sakura cheese
- Hwajeon
- Japanese tea ceremony
- Wajik
- Kashiwa mochi
- Hanabiramochi
- Hishi mochi
- Warabimochi
- Zunda-mochi
- Kuzumochi
- Kusa mochi
- Hyōroku mochi
- Botamochi
- Kusamochi
