= Mountain Cheese Olympics =

Annual cheese festival in Austria

Austria and Hungary Map

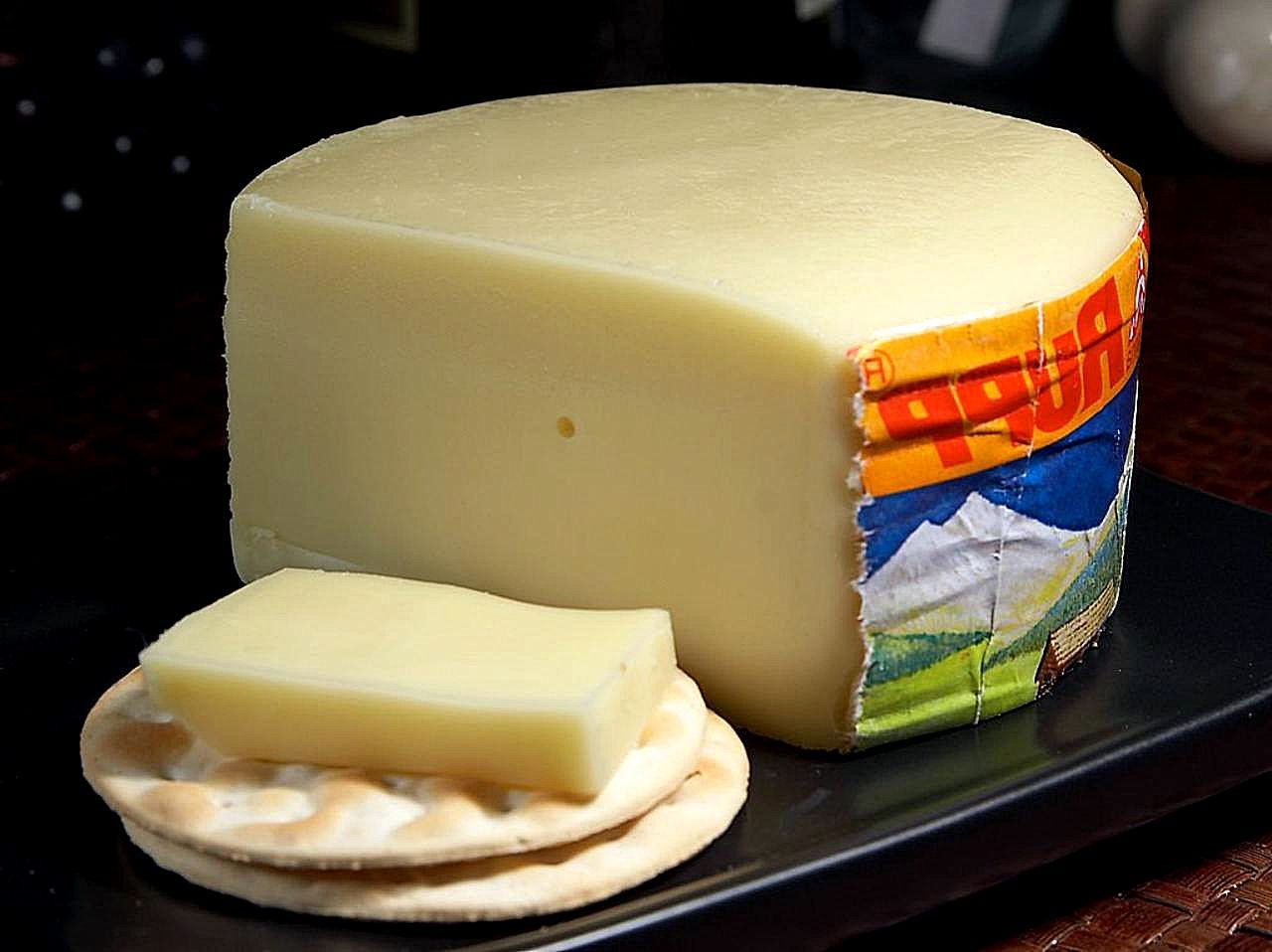
Mountain Cheese

The International Mountain Cheese Olympics is a cheese festival and competition that has been ongoing for over 18 years. Cheesemakers from all over the world, including Switzerland, Japan, Mexico, Canada, Germany, Italy and many others compete to have the most exceptional quality of artisan mountain cheese. In previous years, the festival was held in Appenzell, Switzerland, and was originally intended to help promote the economic interests of the mountain regions of Switzerland. Currently, the festival is held in Galtür, Austria, a small ski resort village. Some popular tourist attractions in Galtür include hiking, biking, and open-air thermal spas regularly enjoyed by tourists and natives alike. Many people love the mountain air and crystal-clear lakes, but it is high-altitude sunlight, not snow, that is the new obsession. The festival will celebrate its 25th edition in September 2019.

Mountain cheeses are particularly important to this festival and differ from mass-produced cheese sold all around the world. The festival focuses on "mountain cheese" because they have separate and more distinct qualities that other kinds of cheese don't. Mountain cheeses are most often made from sheep or goat milk, and tend to be softer than most types of cheeses. This cheese, focused on in the International Mountain Cheese Olympics, can also be known as Alpine cheese. The term "Alpine cheese" simply means any cheese indigenous to the Alps, the European mountain range marking the borders of Switzerland, France, Austria, and Italy. These cheeses have achieved global fame and replication, however, because of the centuries-old recipes and methods that make these cheeses so special. This particular group of cheese is made from animals, such as sheep and goats, that have grazed in the high elevation pastures. This type of cheese is important because it has a rich and complex flavour, which is why people from around the world come to compete for the best mountain cheese. The cheesemakers allowed to compete in this event have to be cheese artisans, making cheeses at altitudes over 600 m (1,970 ft), with prizes for taste and quality.

The 2021 International Mountain Cheese Olympics will be held in Galtür, Austria, which is a small, well known ski resort village located in the upper Paznaun valley in the state of Tyrol. The Mountain Cheese Olympics were founded in 2002 "to promote the mountain region economy", and the festival itself consists of many events. This annual celebration allows festival visitors to purchase all different types of mountain cheeses by the competitors and explore international cuisine. The competition is the main highlight of the entire annual event, centering around how the mountain cheese is shaped and displayed, as well as taste. According to experts, the cheese industry is affected by several factors; economic factors like marketing and sales, and cultural factors related to the areas where the cheese is manufactured. This is why, at first, Switzerland started this competition to help their economic interest and allow individuals from all around the world to share their appreciation for mountain cheese. Though it was started primarily by Switzerland, France and Italy happen to dominate its awards, and there are typically over 100 entries, from all over the world, including Japan, Mexico, and Ethiopia.
