= Yukimi Daifuku =

Lotte brand of mochi ice cream

Yukimi daifuku
- Japanese snack food
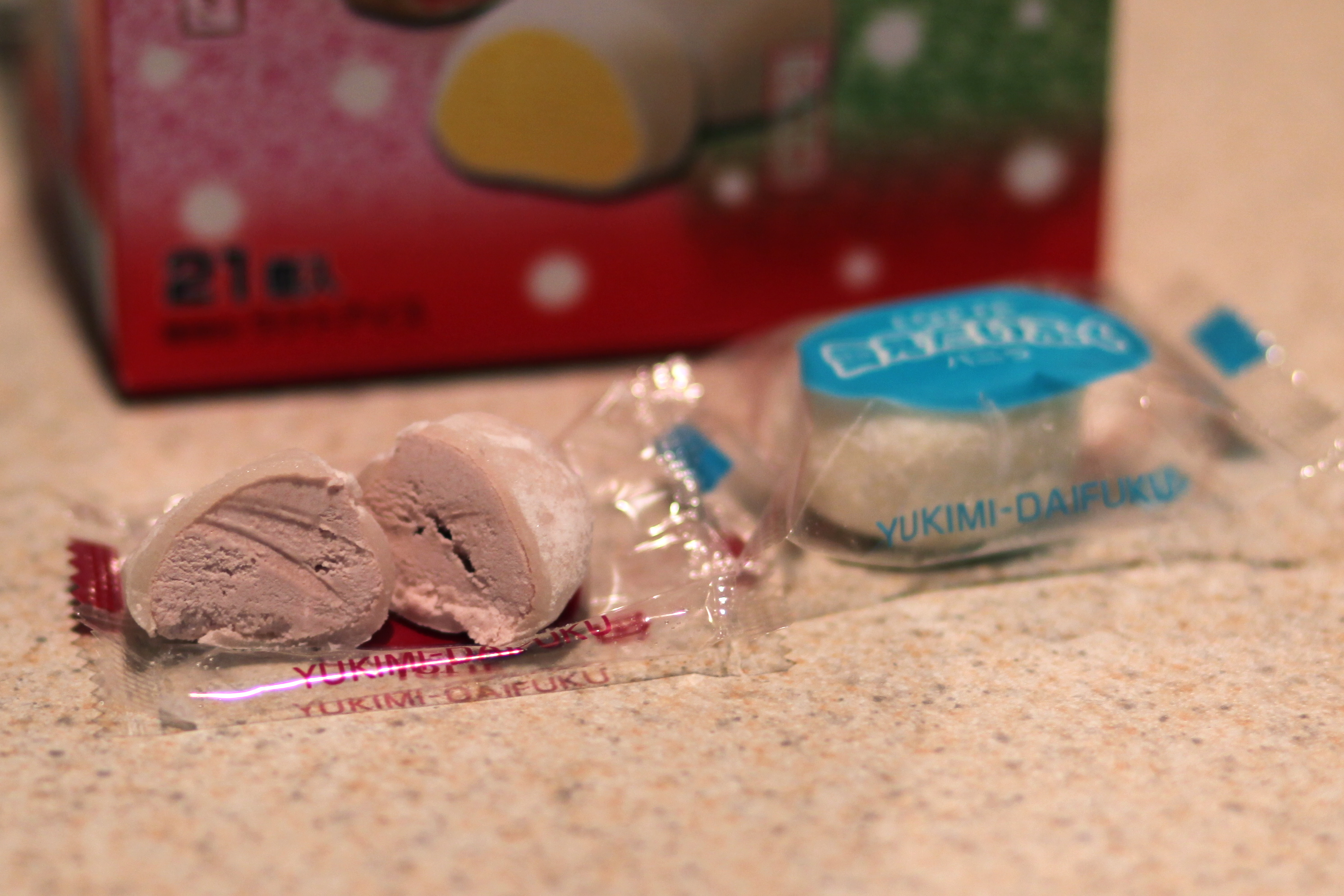
- Japanese name: 雪見だいふく
- Maker: Lotte
- Ingredients: ice milk, mochi
- Flavours: vanilla, strawberry, red bean paste, green tea, and chocolate

Yukimi Daifuku (Japanese: 雪見だいふく "snow-viewing daifuku") is a brand of mochi ice cream manufactured by Lotte.

== History ==
It was initially released in Japan in October 1981. It consists of a ball of vanilla ice milk wrapped in a thin layer of mochi. Lotte originally created Watabōshi (Japanese: わたぼうし, a white bridal hood worn with a shiromuku), a bite-size lacto ice (ice cream-like frozen dessert) wrapped in a thin layer of marshmallow in 1980. Marshmallow was quickly replaced by mochi because it was more popular in Japan and the company perfected a technology to keep mochi soft at freezing temperature in 1981.

== Varieties ==
It comes in three sizes: a carton containing two pieces of ice milk or lacto ice, with a plastic pick for eating it; a "mini yukimi daifuku" box with nine smaller ice milks that contain 9 spoons; and "yukimi daifuku petit three colour box" (雪見だいふくプチ3色 Yukimi Daifuku Puchi San-shoku) containing three kinds, a green tea lacto ice, a chocolate lacto ice, and a vanilla lacto ice. Many people favour the Vanilla, known for its sweet taste.

Aside from its regular vanilla flavor, there is also strawberry milk, triple chocolate raw, tokachi azuki, and raw chocolate.

The regular Yukimi daifuku, strawberry milk, and triple chocolate raw comes in a packaging of two pieces (47 mL each). The tokachi azuki and raw chocolate flavour comes in the same packaging as the mini box. They contain nine pieces with 30 mL in each.

In the hanami (cherry blossom viewing) season, a seasonal variety with strawberry lacto ice is sold.

== Etymology ==
Yukimi is a seasonal activity in Japan, similar to hanami, consisting of watching snow falling. The name is a play upon tsukimi daifuku (月見大福, "moon-viewing daifuku"), the sweets traditionally eaten while viewing the Moon.

== See also ==
- Mochi ice cream
- Snow skin mooncake
