= Daifuku =

Japanese confection

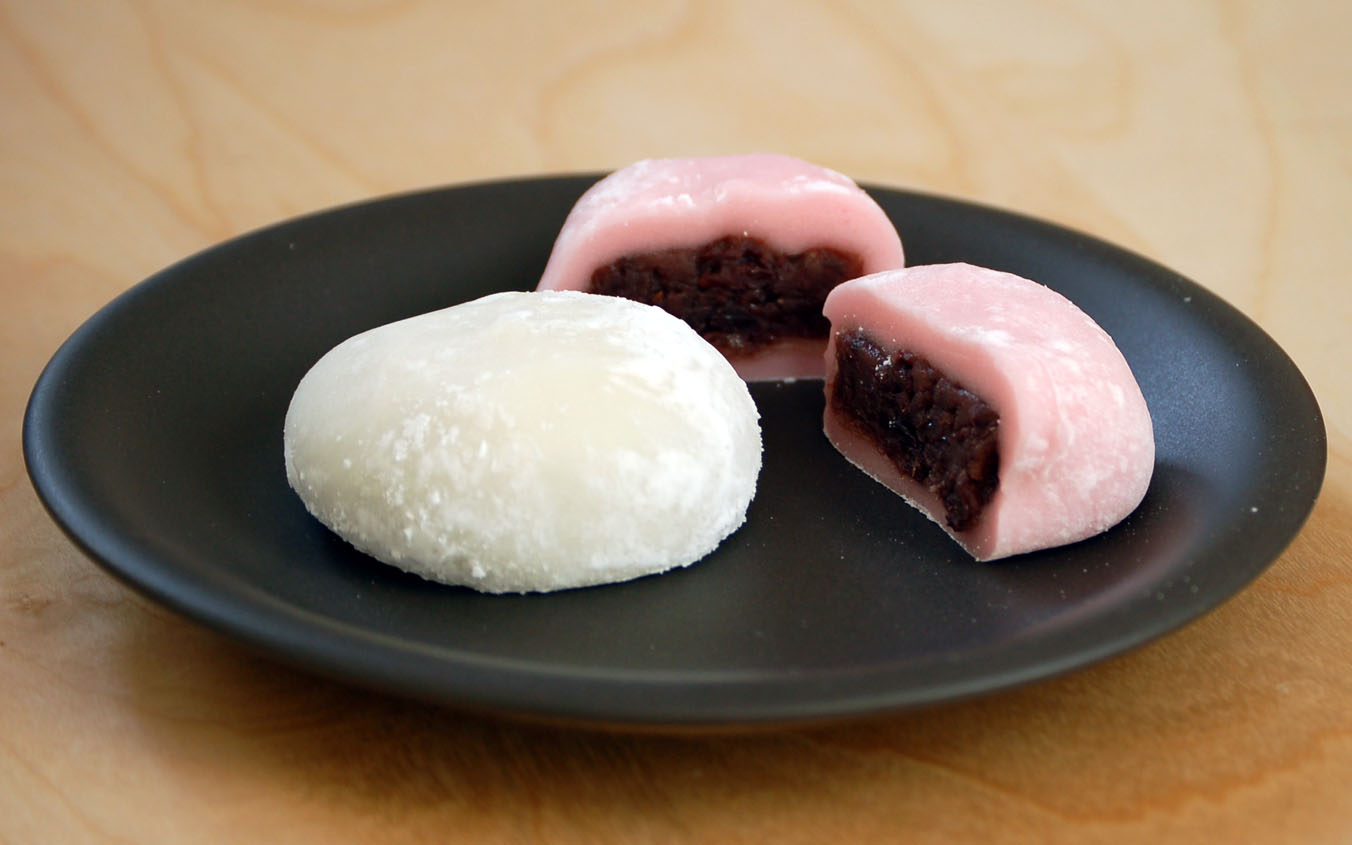
- Alternative names: Daifukumochi (Kōhaku type)
- Place of origin: Japan
- Region or state: East Asia
- Main ingredients: glutinous rice, sweet filling (usually red bean paste)
- Variations: Yomogi daifuku, Ichigo daifuku, Yukimi Daifuku

Daifukumochi (大福餅), or daifuku (大福) (literally "great luck"), is a wagashi, a type of Japanese confection, consisting of a small round mochi stuffed with a sweet filling, most commonly anko, a sweetened red bean paste made from azuki beans. Daifuku is often served with green tea.

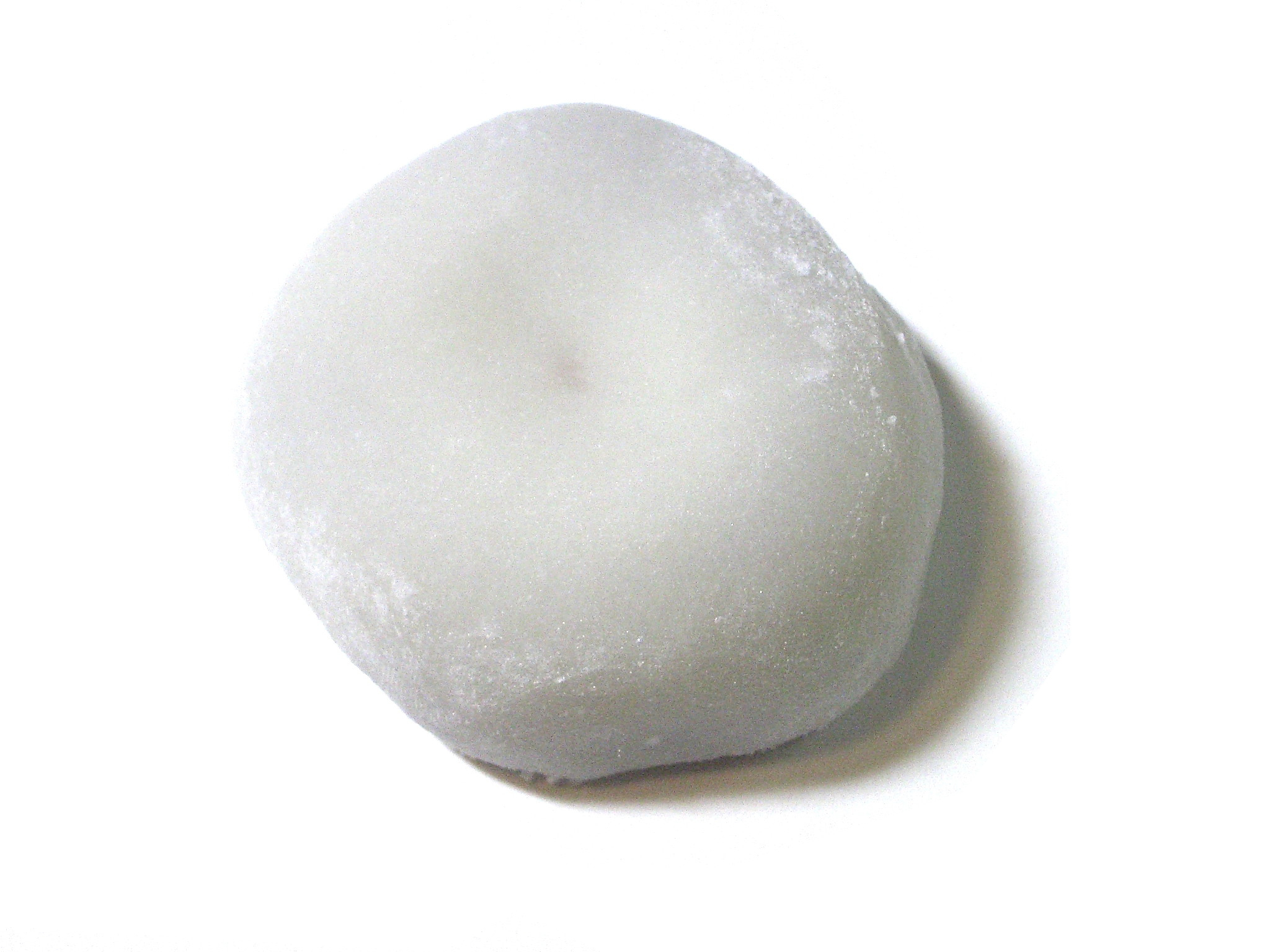
Daifuku (plain type)

Daifuku comes in many varieties. The most common are white, pale green, or pale pink-colored mochi filled with anko. Daifuku are approximately 4 cm (1.5 in) in diameter. Nearly all are covered in a fine layer of rice flour (rice starch), corn starch, or potato starch to keep them from sticking to each other or to the fingers. Though mochitsuki is the traditional method of making mochi and daifuku, they can also be cooked in a microwave.

== History ==
Daifuku was originally called uzura mochi (鶉餅; quail rice cake) or harabuto mochi (腹太餅; belly thick rice cake) because of its shape and filling nature. Later, the name was changed to daifuku mochi (大腹餅; big belly rice cake). Since the pronunciations of belly (腹, fuku) and luck (福, fuku) are the same in Japanese, the name was further changed to great luck rice cake (大福餅, daifuku mochi), a bringer of good luck. By the end of the 18th century, daifuku were gaining popularity, and people began eating them toasted. They were also used for gifts in ceremonial occasions.

== Varieties ==
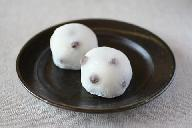
Mame daifuku

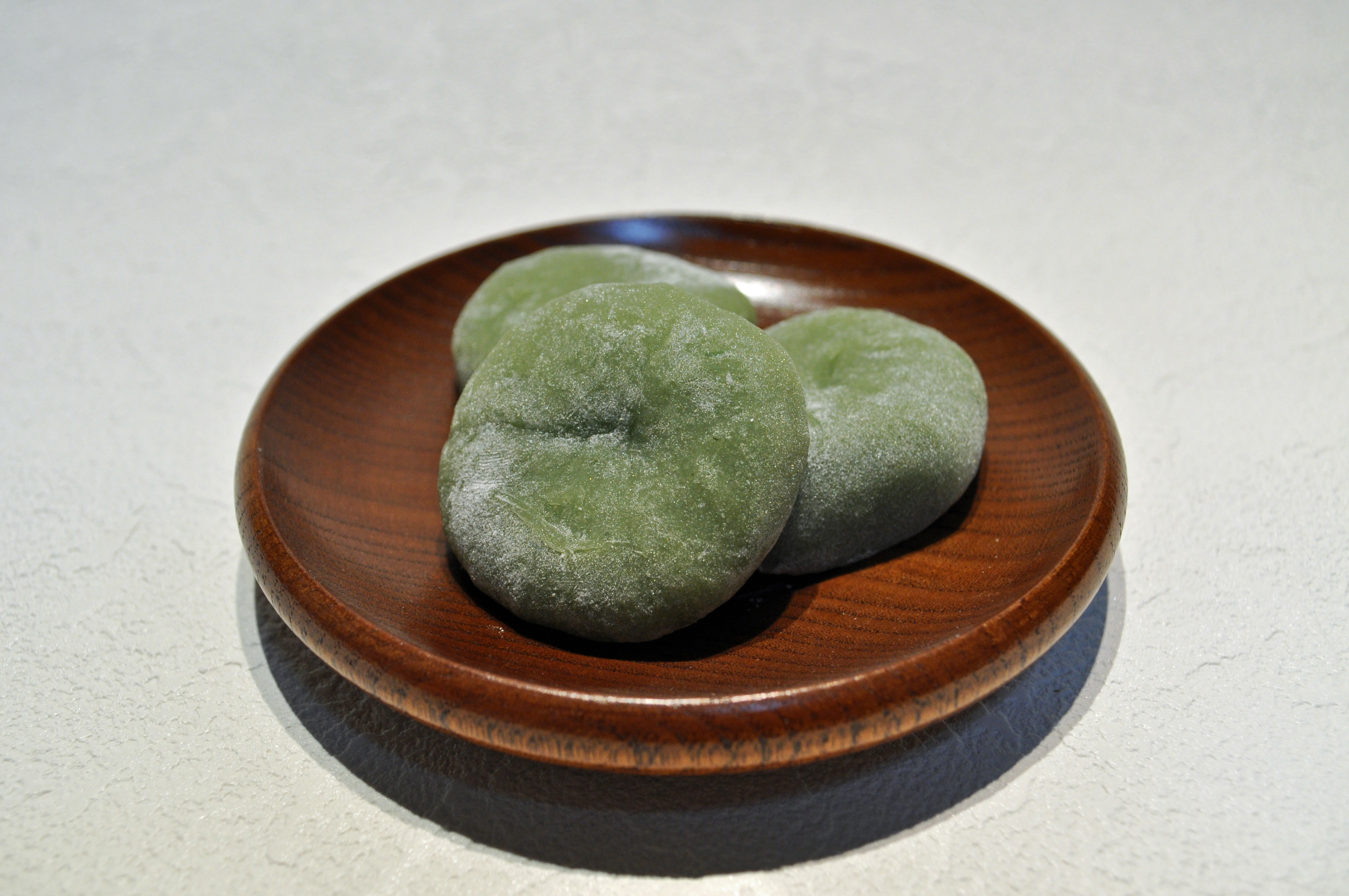
Yomogi daifuku

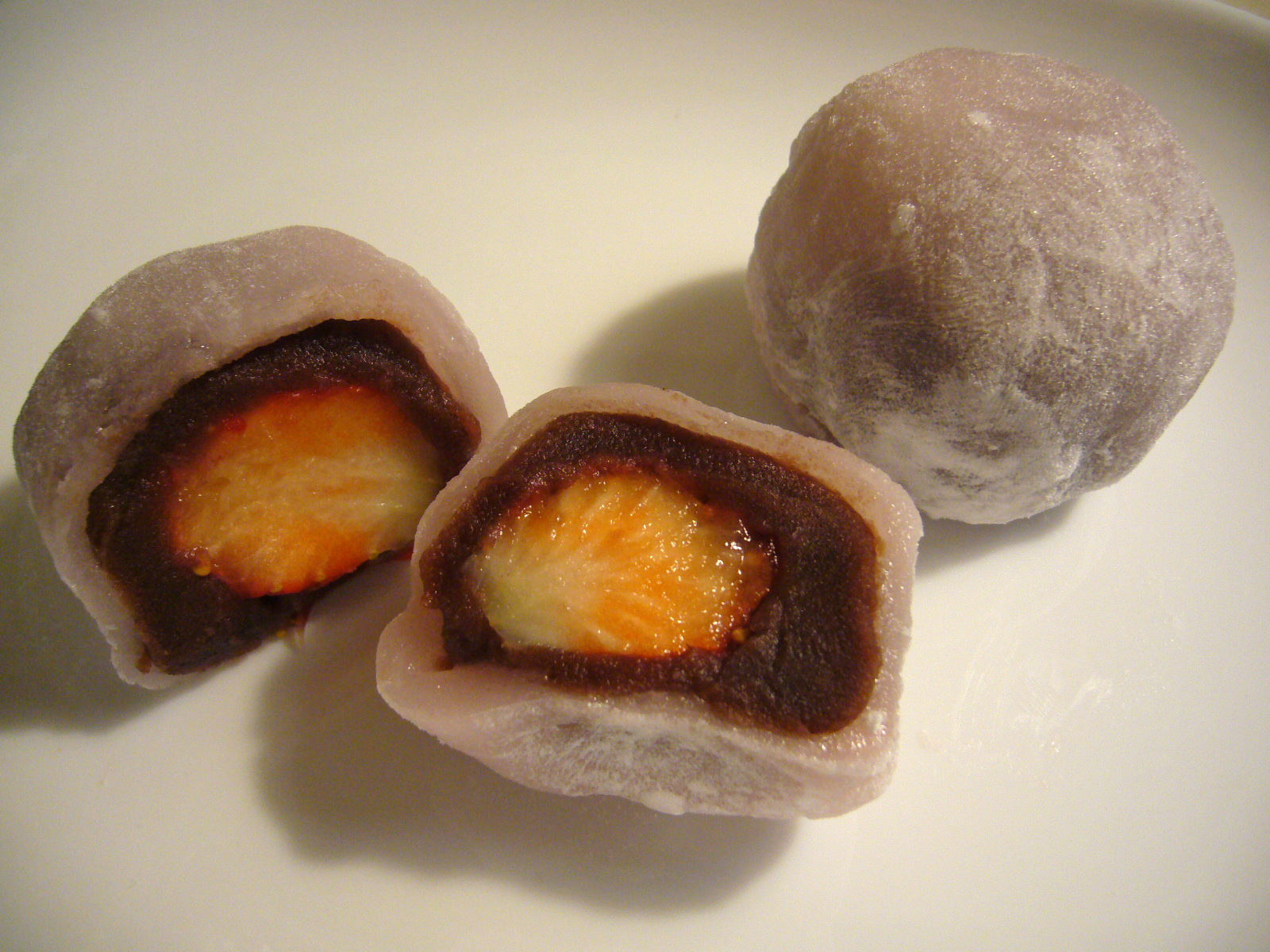
Ichigo daifuku

Yomogi daifuku (蓬大福)
A version made with kusa mochi (草餅), which is mochi flavored with mugwort.

Mame daifuku (豆大福)
A version where azuki beans or soybeans are mixed into mochi and/or azuki sweetfilling.

Shio daifuku (塩大福)
A version which contains unsweetened anko filling; it has a mild salty taste.

Awa daifuku (あわ大福)
A version made with Awa mochi (粟餅), which is mochi mixed with Foxtail millet.

Ichigo daifuku (イチゴ大福)
A variation containing strawberry and sweet filling, most commonly anko, inside a small round mochi. Creams are sometimes used for sweet filling. Because it contains strawberry, it is usually eaten during the springtime. It was invented in the 1980s. Many patisseries claim to have invented the confection, so its exact origin is vague.

Ume daifuku (梅大福)
A version which contains sweetened Japanese plum instead of azuki sweetfilling.

Coffee daifuku (コーヒー大福)
A version which contains coffee flavored sweetfilling.

Mont Blanc daifuku (モンブラン大福)
A version which contains puréed, sweetened chestnuts (Mont Blanc cream) instead of azuki sweetfilling.

Purin daifuku (プリン大福)
A version which contains crème caramel (プリン) instead of azuki sweetfilling.

Mochi ice cream (もちアイス)
A version which contains ice cream instead of azuki sweetfilling.

== See also ==
- Lo mai chi
- Yukimi Daifuku (雪見だいふく) – A brand name of mochi ice cream made by the company Lotte.
