= My/Mochi Ice Cream =

American ice cream brand

- Founded: March 2015; Los Angeles, California
- Headquarters: Los Angeles, California, United States
- Area served: Canada; United States; Mexico
- Products: Mochi ice cream, frozen desserts
- Website: https://www.mymochi.com/

My/Mochi Ice Cream is an American ice cream brand sold in the United States, Mexico and Canada. The company was founded in 2015, after private equity firm Century Park Capital Partners bought Mikawaya, a Los Angeles–based confectionery company that is credited with the invention of mochi ice cream. To popularize mochi ice cream and make it more accessible, the company launched the My/Mo Mochi Ice Cream brand in 2017.

My/Mochi sells mochi ice cream, low-calorie ice cream balls wrapped in a pillowy sweet rice dumpling. My/Mochi manufactures and markets an assortment of mochi ice cream flavors including dairy, and non-dairy and vegan choices. My/Mochi is generally found in the frozen food aisles of grocery stores, though certain grocery chains have established “Mochi Bars” where the confection can be accessed quickly and easily.

In January 2020, Lakeview Capital acquired My/Mochi from Century Park Capital Partners. In June 2020, My/Mochi introduced single-serve packaging due to both environmental and food safety concerns.

In February 2021, My/Mo Mochi Ice Cream changed its name to My/Mochi Ice Cream.
