= Bubbies =

Ice cream manufacturer in Arizona

Bubbies Homemade Ice Cream and Desserts is an ice cream manufacturer in Arizona. Started in 1985 in Honolulu, the production and office facilities are now located in Phoenix, Arizona. The company sells ice cream cakes and mochi ice cream in Hawaii as well as mainland USA and several other countries. Bubbies mochi ice cream was voted readers' pick by Honolulu and has appeared on Oprah Winfrey's O list. Keith Robbins (aka Hawaii's Mr. Bubbie) the founder of Bubbies Homemade Ice Cream sold his business after 32 years. In January 2020, Bubbies closed their last brick and mortar located at Hawaii Kai.

== See also ==
- List of ice cream brands
