= Mikawaya =

American confectionary producer

Mikawaya Incorporated
- Industry: Ice cream; Confectionery
- Founded: 1910; 116 years ago in Los Angeles, California
- Founder: Ryuzaburo Hashimoto
- Headquarters: Torrance, California
- Key people: Frances Hashimoto (President and CEO 1970–2012)
- Products: Wagashi; Mochi ice cream
- Website: www.mikawayausa.com

Mikawaya is an American confectionery producer specializing in Japanese pastries, snacks, and desserts. The company's products include traditional wagashi, as well as newer offerings, such as mochi ice cream. Mochi ice cream, which was created by Mikawaya's former CEO and President Frances Hashimoto, now represents the majority of Mikawaya's annual sales.

== History ==
Mikawaya was founded as a small, traditional Japanese wagashi confectionery store in Little Tokyo, Los Angeles in 1910. In 1942, The owners of the family-owned business, husband and wife Koroku and Haru Hashimoto, were forced to close their business with the outbreak of World War II. Koroku and Haru Hashimoto were interned and sent to the Poston War Relocation Center in Poston, Arizona. They returned to Los Angeles following their release and the end of the war. The Hashimotos reopened Mikawaya at 244 E. First Street in Los Angeles' Little Tokyo neighborhood on December 23, 1945.

Frances Hashimoto became CEO of Mikawaya in 1970 when she was 27 years old. Her father had recently died and her mother asked her to join the family-run confectionery business. Hashimoto, who was working as an elementary school teacher at the time, considered her decision for six months before leaving teaching and joining Mikawaya.

== Expansion ==
Hashimoto sought to expand the family's business from one location in Little Tokyo to a multi-store enterprise. In 1974, she opened a second bakery location on Fourth Street in Los Angeles. Under Hashimoto, who served as CEO and president, Mikawaya expanded to include additional locations in Little Tokyo, Torrance, California, Gardena, California, and Honolulu, Hawaii. On June 29, 2021, the company's flagship store located at the Japanese Village Plaza in Little Tokyo permanently closed.

== The Mochi ice cream line ==
Frances Hashimoto is credited as the inventor of the popular mochi ice cream. She also spearheaded the line's introduction the American market through Mikawaya. Hashimoto's husband, Joel Friedman, initially conceived the idea of wrapping small orbs of ice cream with a coating of mochi, a sweet Japanese rice cake, during the early 1990s. Hashimoto expanded on the idea, offering seven flavors of mochi ice cream made by Mikawaya. The mochi ice cream line proved a hit with consumers, expanding Mikawaya from more traditional Japanese pastries like chestnut buns or rice cakes. Mikawaya now sells its mochi ice cream in Albertsons, Trader Joe's, Ralphs, and Safeway. Mochi ice cream now accounts for the majority of Mikawaya's sales.
