= Frances Hashimoto =

American businesswoman (1943–2012)

- Born: August 26, 1943; Poston War Relocation Center, Yuma County, Arizona, United States
- Died: November 4, 2012 (aged 69); Pasadena, California, United States
- Monuments: Frances Hashimoto Plaza, Los Angeles
- Education: Hollenbeck Junior High School; Theodore Roosevelt High School
- Alma mater: University of Southern California
- Occupations: Businesswoman, social activist, schoolteacher
- Spouse: Joel Friedman
- Children: 2
- Honours: Order of the Rising Sun (5th Class)

Frances Kazuko Hashimoto (August 26, 1943 – November 4, 2012) was an American businesswoman, schoolteacher, and social activist. She was a key figure and proponent of Los Angeles' Little Tokyo neighborhood. She was the head of Mikawaya confectionery company since 1970, where Hashimoto, the inventor of mochi ice cream, also introduced the dessert to American consumers.

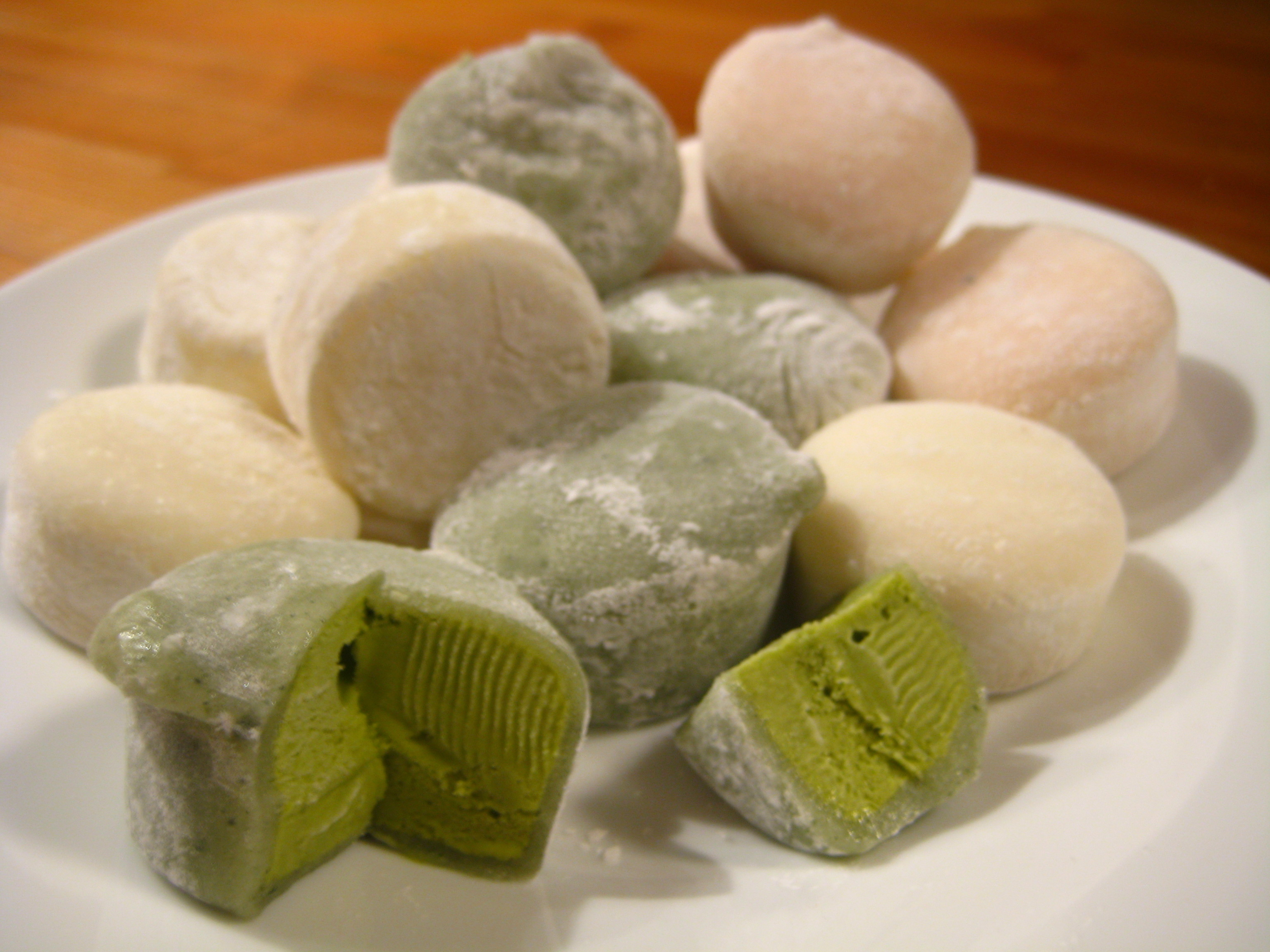
Mochi ice cream, created by Hashimoto.

== Biography ==
=== Early life ===
Hashimoto's parents, Koroku and Haru Hashimoto, owned the family-owned Mikawaya wagashi, a traditional Japanese confectionery which opened in 1910 in Los Angeles. They were forced to shutter their business with the outbreak of World War II. Koroku and Haru were interned with thousands of other Japanese Americans during World War II due to Executive Order 9066. They were sent to the Poston War Relocation Center in Poston, Arizona. Frances Hashimoto was born in the Poston War Relocation Center on August 26, 1943. The family returned to Los Angeles after the war and their release from internment. Hashimoto's parents reopened Mikawaya at 244 E. First Street in the city's Little Tokyo on December 23, 1945.

Hashimoto was raised in Boyle Heights, Los Angeles. She attended Hollenbeck Junior High School, where her classmates included Ellen Endo, the former editor of Rafu Shimpo, and Theodore Roosevelt High School in Boyle Heights. Hashimoto received a bachelor's degree from the University of Southern California (USC) in 1966 and became an elementary school teacher.

=== Mikawaya ===
She taught third grade for four years until her mother, who had been widowed, asked her to join the family business full-time in 1970. Hashimoto mulled over her decision for six months before ultimately deciding to leave teaching. She became the chief executive officer of Mikawaya in 1970, when she was twenty-seven years old.

Though she faced some instances of gender bias, Hashimoto quickly sought to expand the family's business from one location in Little Tokyo to a multi-store enterprise. In 1974, she opened a second bakery location on Fourth Street in Los Angeles. Under Hashimoto, who served as CEO and president, Mikawaya expanded to include additional locations in Little Tokyo, Torrance, California, Gardena, California, and Honolulu, Hawaii. The company's flagship store is located at the Japanese Village Plaza in Little Tokyo.

Frances Hashimoto is credited as creator of the popular mochi ice cream. She also spearheaded the line's introduction to the American market. Hashimoto's husband, Joel Friedman, initially conceived the idea of wrapping small orbs of ice cream with a coating of mochi, a sweet Japanese rice cake, during the early 1990s. Hashimoto expanded on the idea, offering seven flavors of mochi ice cream made by Mikawaya. The mochi ice cream line proved a hit with consumers, expanding Mikawaya from more traditional Japanese pastries like chestnut buns or rice cakes. Mikawaya now sells its mochi ice cream in Whole Foods, Albertsons, Trader Joe's, Ralphs, and Safeway. Mochi ice cream now accounts for the majority of Mikawaya's sales.

=== Community activism ===
Hashimoto worked for the preservation of Little Tokyo, with challenges ranging from changing demographics to economic downturns.

In 1982, Hashimoto became the first woman to chair the Nisei Week Japanese Festival. She organized fundraising for Nisei Week and remained a strong proponent of the festival in the face of declining attendance in recent years, arguing that younger Japanese Americans needed to remain aware of their cultural heritage. She arranged for the festival's annually crowned Nisei Week queen and princesses to attend an exchange in Nagoya, a sister city of Los Angeles. Hashimoto also pushed for stronger ties between Little Tokyo and Minami Otsu Dori Shotengai, a section of Nagoya.

Hashimoto served as the President of Little Tokyo Business Association (LTBA) from 1994 to 2008. She actively sought to preserve the character of Little Tokyo and oversaw the redevelopment of the neighborhood, including signage, housing, and security. Los Angeles City Councilwoman Jan Perry later noted that, "She worked very hard to protect the history, integrity and identity of Little Tokyo as the largest Japantown in California." She was also a member of the boards of several Japanese American organizations, including the Japanese American Cultural & Community Center (JACCC) and the Japanese Chamber of Commerce of Southern California. Hashimoto also served as the vice president of the Little Tokyo Community Council.

== Awards ==
In the spring of 2012, the government of Japan awarded Hashimoto the Order of the Rising Sun, Gold and Silver Rays, for her contributions to Japan–United States relations.

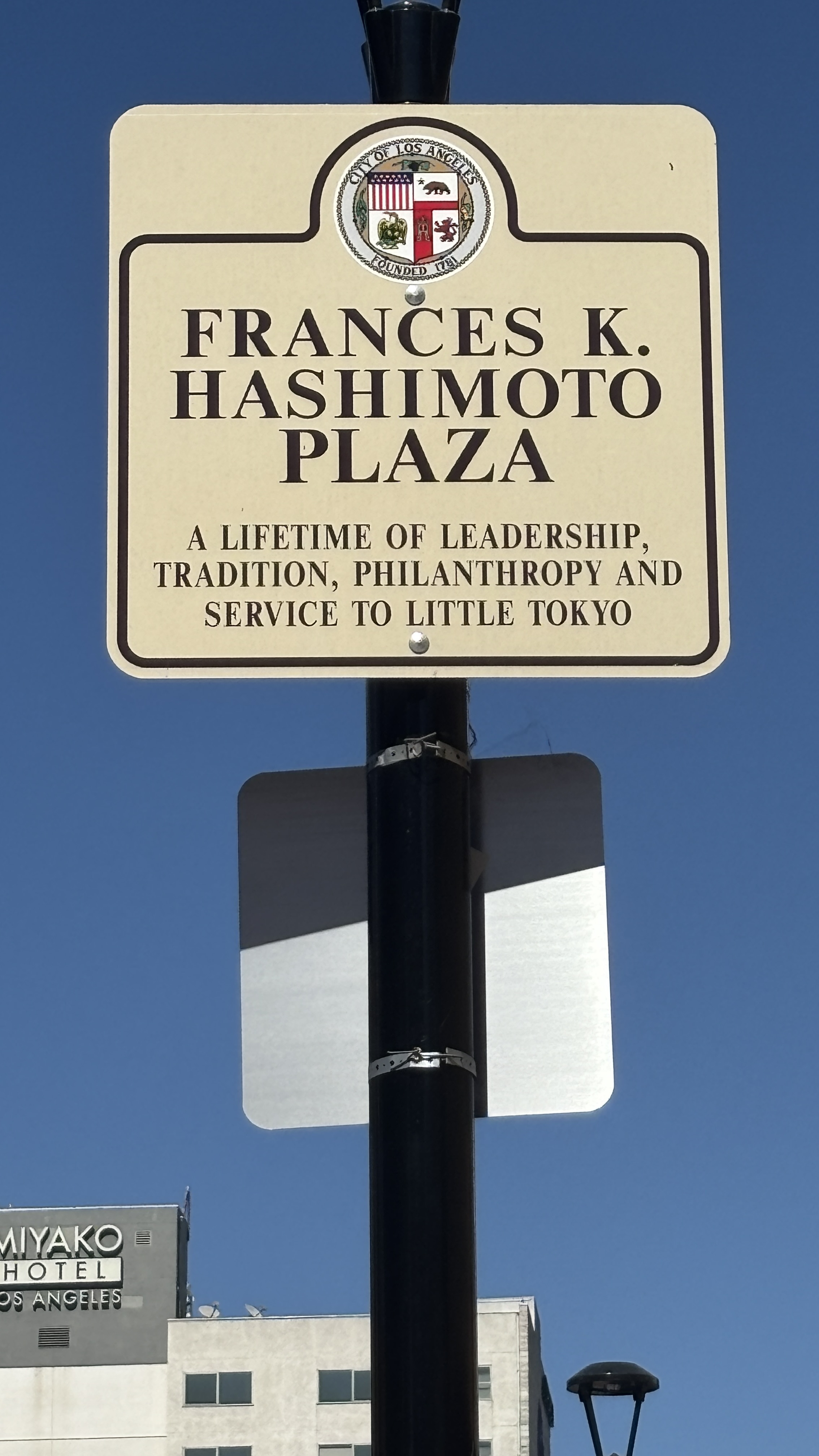
Frances K. Hashimoto Plaza

On September 19, 2012, the Los Angeles City Council unanimously voted to rename the intersection of Azusa and Second Streets "Frances Hashimoto Plaza" in recognition of her cultural contributions to the city. The motion was jointly sponsored by city council members José Huizar, who represents Boyle Heights, and Jan Perry, who represents Downtown Los Angeles, including Little Tokyo. The new name for the plaza was formally unveiled at a ceremony held on November 15, 2012.

The Nisei Week Foundation's annually awarded community service award is now named in her honor.

== Death ==
Hashimoto died at her home in Pasadena, California, from lung cancer on Sunday, November 4, 2012, at the age of 69. She was survived by her husband, Joel Friedman, their sons, Bryan Koji and Ryan Koroku Hashimoto-Friedman, and her sister, Sachiko June Osugi.
