= Mochi ice cream =

Mochi filled with ice cream

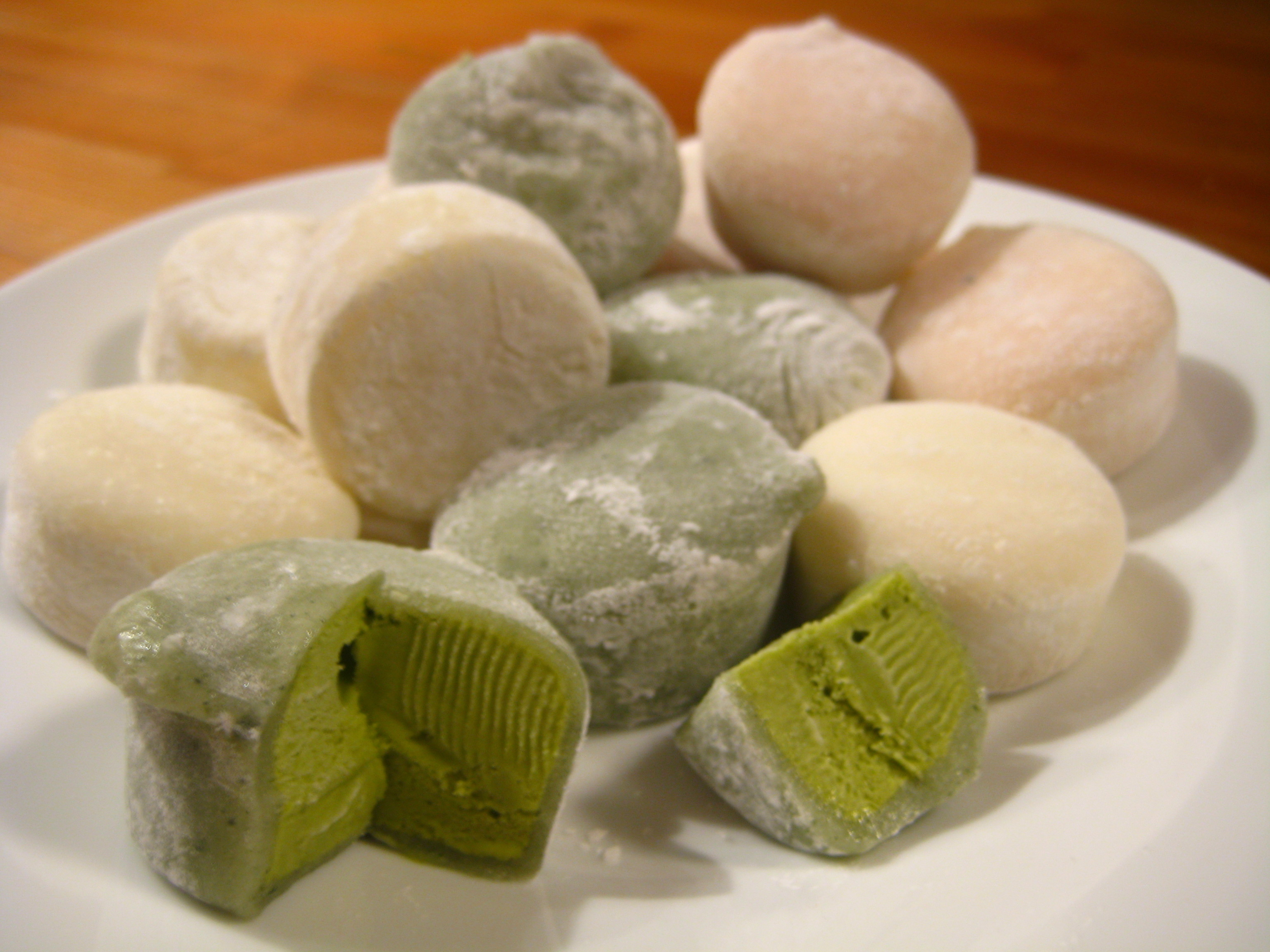
- Mochi ice cream in green tea, vanilla, and strawberry flavors
- Course: Dessert
- Place of origin: Japan
- Region or state: East Asia
- Serving temperature: Cold
- Main ingredients: Mochi, ice cream, powdered sugar

Mochi ice cream is a confection made from Japanese mochi (pounded sticky rice) with an ice cream (ice milk in some cases) filling. In the United States, it was pioneered by Japanese-American businesswoman and community activist Frances Hashimoto with help from her husband, Joel.

== Description ==
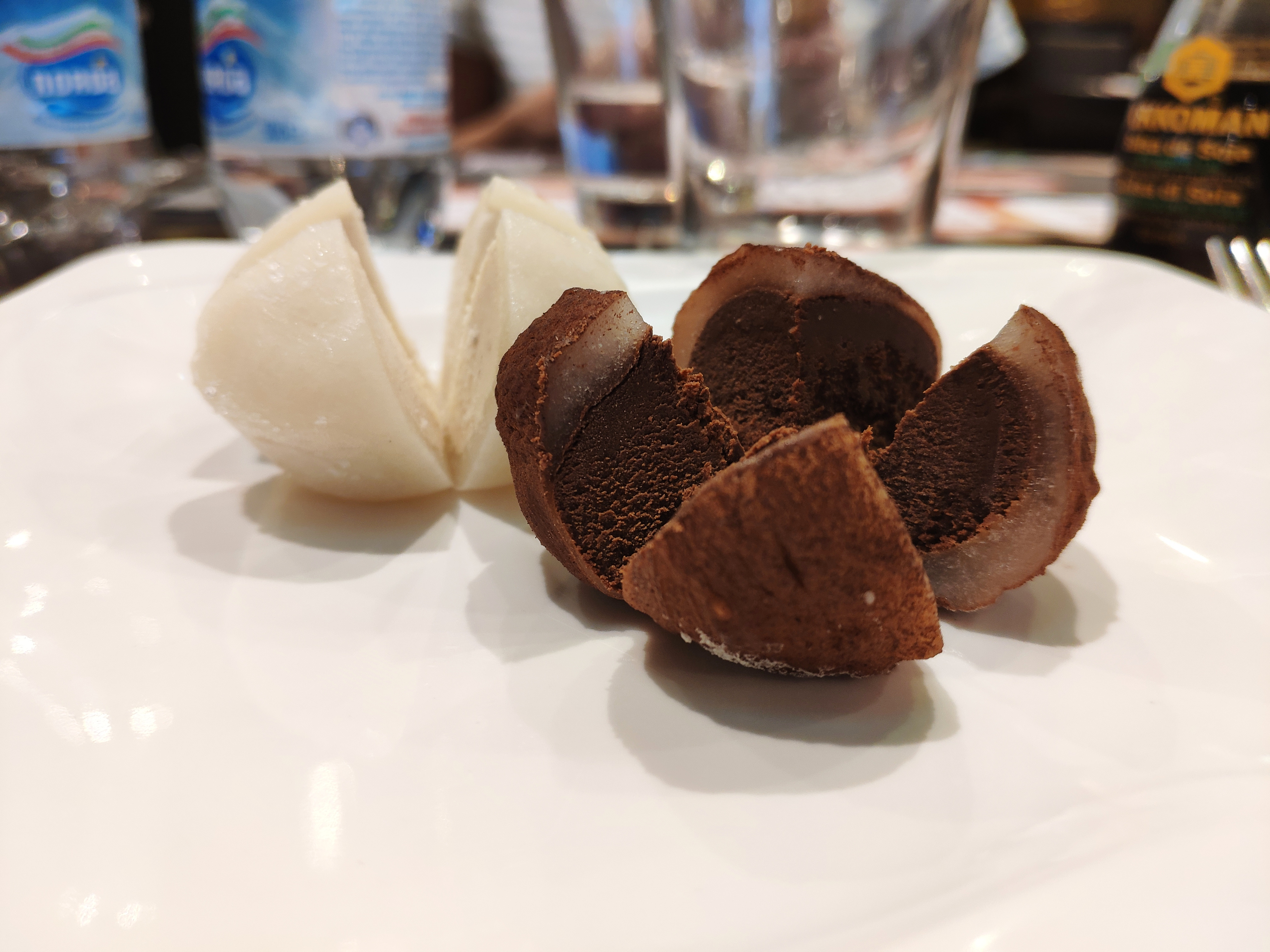
Vanilla and chocolate mochi ice cream

Mochi ice cream is a small, round confection consisting of a soft, pounded sticky rice dumpling (mochi) formed around an ice cream filling. The ice cream adds flavor and creaminess to the confectionery while the mochi adds sweetness and texture. The traditional ice cream flavors used are vanilla, chocolate and strawberry. Other flavors, such as Kona coffee, plum wine, green tea, and red bean, are also widely used. Mochi can also be flavored as a complement to the ice cream filling. When making mochi, it is dusted with either potato or cornstarch to keep it from caking while being formed and handled.

== History ==
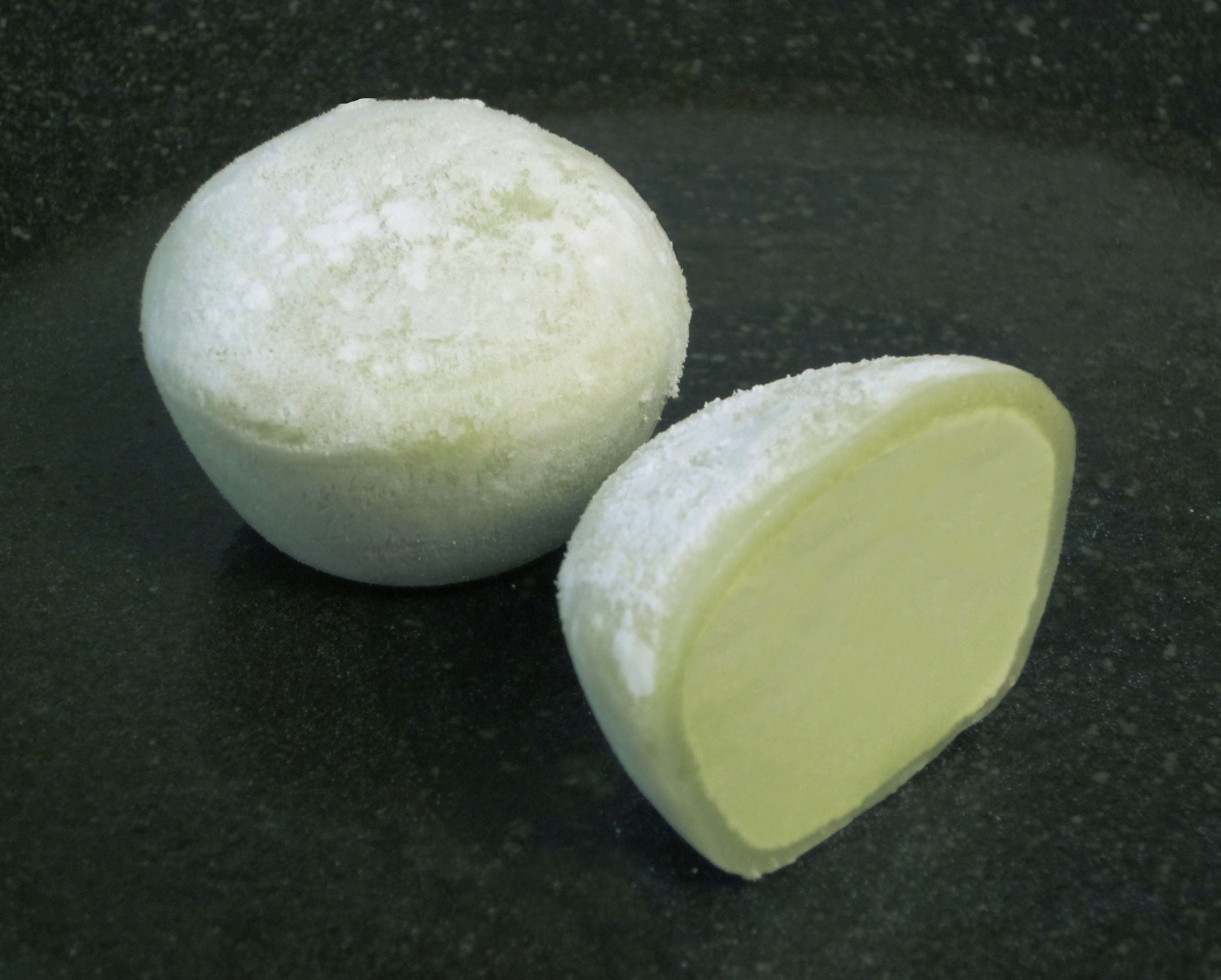
Green tea ice cream mochi

Japanese daifuku is the predecessor to mochi ice cream, commonly featuring adzuki bean filling. Due to the temperature and consistency of mochi and ice cream, both components must be modified. This is to achieve the right viscosity that will remain constant regardless of changes in temperature.

The dessert was originally produced by Lotte as Yukimi Daifuku in 1981. The company first made the product by using a rice starch instead of sticky rice and a rice milk instead of real ice cream.

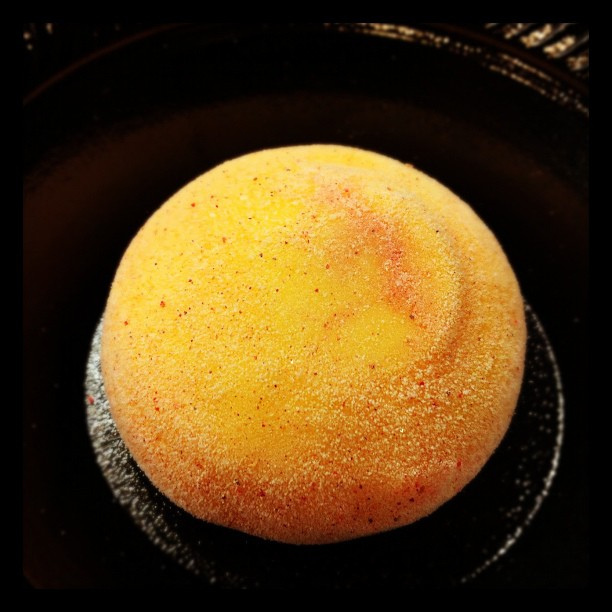
Mango ice cream mochi

Mikawaya, a company in America, began production of mochi ice cream in the United States in 1993. Research and development took over a decade to evolve into the mass production form used today, due to the complex interactions of the ingredients. Trial and error was used in order to successfully pull the delicate mochi dough over the ice cream without leaving a sodden mess. Friedman explained that in order to conduct production of the ice cream, experts in fields ranging from construction to microbiology were brought in to perfect the state-of-the-art production building.

Mikawaya debuted their mochi ice cream in Hawaii in 1994. The frozen treat was so popular, it captured 15% of the novelty frozen treat market during its first four months.

Mochi ice cream gained huge popularity in the UK following a viral TikTok trend, which began in January 2021. The trend of ‘Looking for Little Moons in Big Tesco’ became a sensation, receiving 341.8M views and a surge in sales of 1400% in Tesco alone.

Now, stores like Trader Joe's sell mochi ice cream with flavors such as mango, chocolate, and, in some places, purple yam.

== See also ==
- My/Mochi
- Bubbies
- Yukimi Daifuku
- Snow skin mooncake
- Cream puff
