= Snow skin mooncake =

Cold mooncake with glutinous rice crust

Snow-skin mooncake
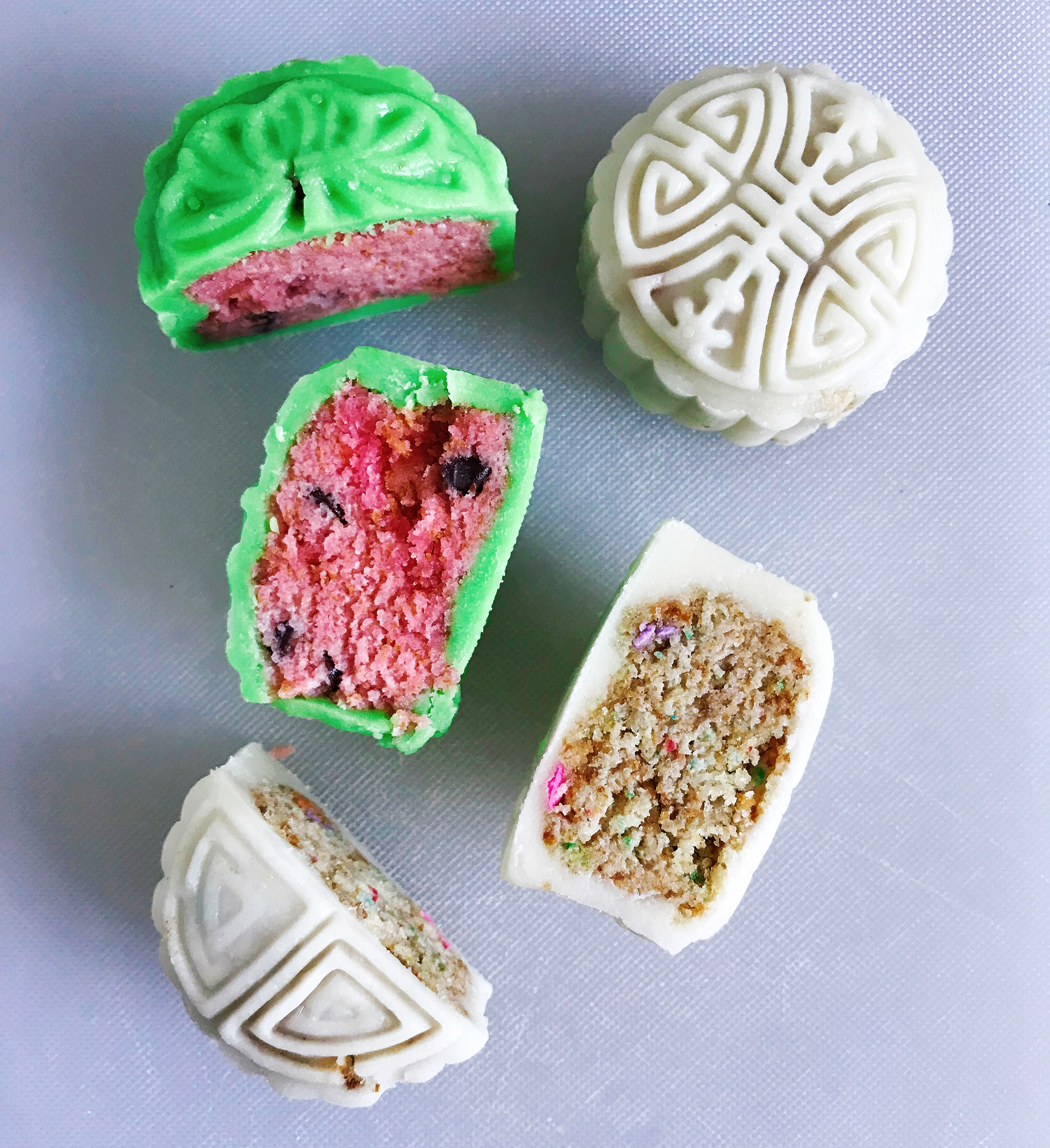
- Alternative names: Snowy mooncake, ice skin mooncake, crystal mooncake
- Place of origin: Hong Kong
- Serving temperature: Cold
- Main ingredients: glutinous rice, flour, sugar, milk, vegetable oil, mung bean

Snow skin mooncake
- Traditional Chinese: 冰皮月餅
- Simplified Chinese: 冰皮月饼
Transcriptions
Standard Mandarin
- Hanyu Pinyin: bīng pí yuè bing
Yue: Cantonese
- Jyutping: bing1 pei2 jyut6 beng2

Snow skin mooncake, snowy mooncake, ice skin mooncake or crystal mooncake is a Chinese confection eaten during the Mid-Autumn Festival. It is a cold mooncake with glutinous rice skin, originating from Hong Kong. Snow skin mooncakes are also found in Macau, Mainland China, Taiwan, Singapore, Malaysia and Indonesia. Although snow skin mooncakes are usually made and sold by bakeries, these mooncakes are not baked in ovens like traditional cakes. Unlike traditional mooncakes which are served at room temperature, snow skin mooncakes are typically eaten cold.

== History ==
The snow skin mooncake emerged in the 1960s. It was developed by a bakery in Hong Kong, because the traditional Cantonese mooncakes were made with salted duck egg yolks and lotus seed paste, resulting in very high sugar and oil content. Since many customers thought traditional mooncakes were an oily food, the bakery used fruit for filling and less oil to make a mooncake with less fat. Another early pioneer of snow skin mooncakes is Poh Guan Cake House (宝源饼家) in Singapore.

Snow skin mooncakes gradually become popular in the 1970s. A newspaper in 1980 reported that Singapore community centers were offering snow skin mooncake making courses. However, this version is a copy of Vietnamese mooncake. At that time the snow skin mooncake was also called a "crystal mooncake" (水晶月饼). The name "Bing Pi Yue Bing" (冰皮月饼) appeared in advertisements in the early 1980s.

== Composition ==
The crust of snow skin mooncake is made of glutinous rice, which is frozen. The snow skin mooncake is similar to mochi ice cream or yukimi daifuku, as both have glutinous rice crusts and have to be kept frozen.

Snow skin mooncakes are typically white and are served cold, which is why they are named "snow skin". However, mooncakes may have other colors because of added flavors in their crusts. For example, if chocolate is added, the color of the crust might be brown. Green-colored skin is made with the juice of the aromatic Pandan (Pandanus amaryllifolius) leaf, a popular and uniquely South-East Asian flavor.

While traditional mooncakes are usually filled with salted duck egg yolks and lotus seed paste or red bean paste, snow skin mooncakes can be filled with a variety of fillings such as mung bean paste, fruit, green tea, jam, strawberry, chocolate, coffee, cheese. Other flavored fillings include durian, sesame, mango pomelo sago, and purple yam.

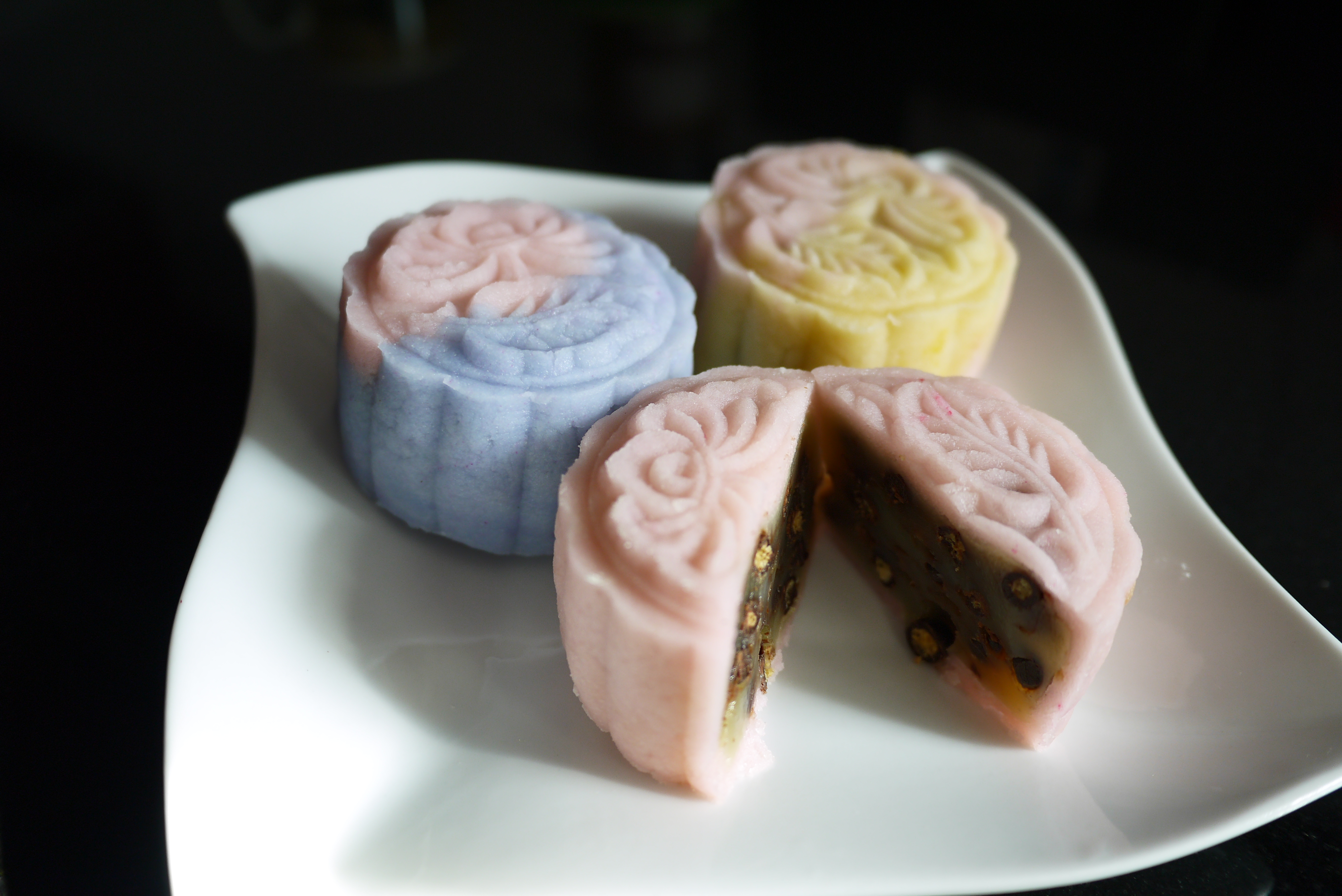

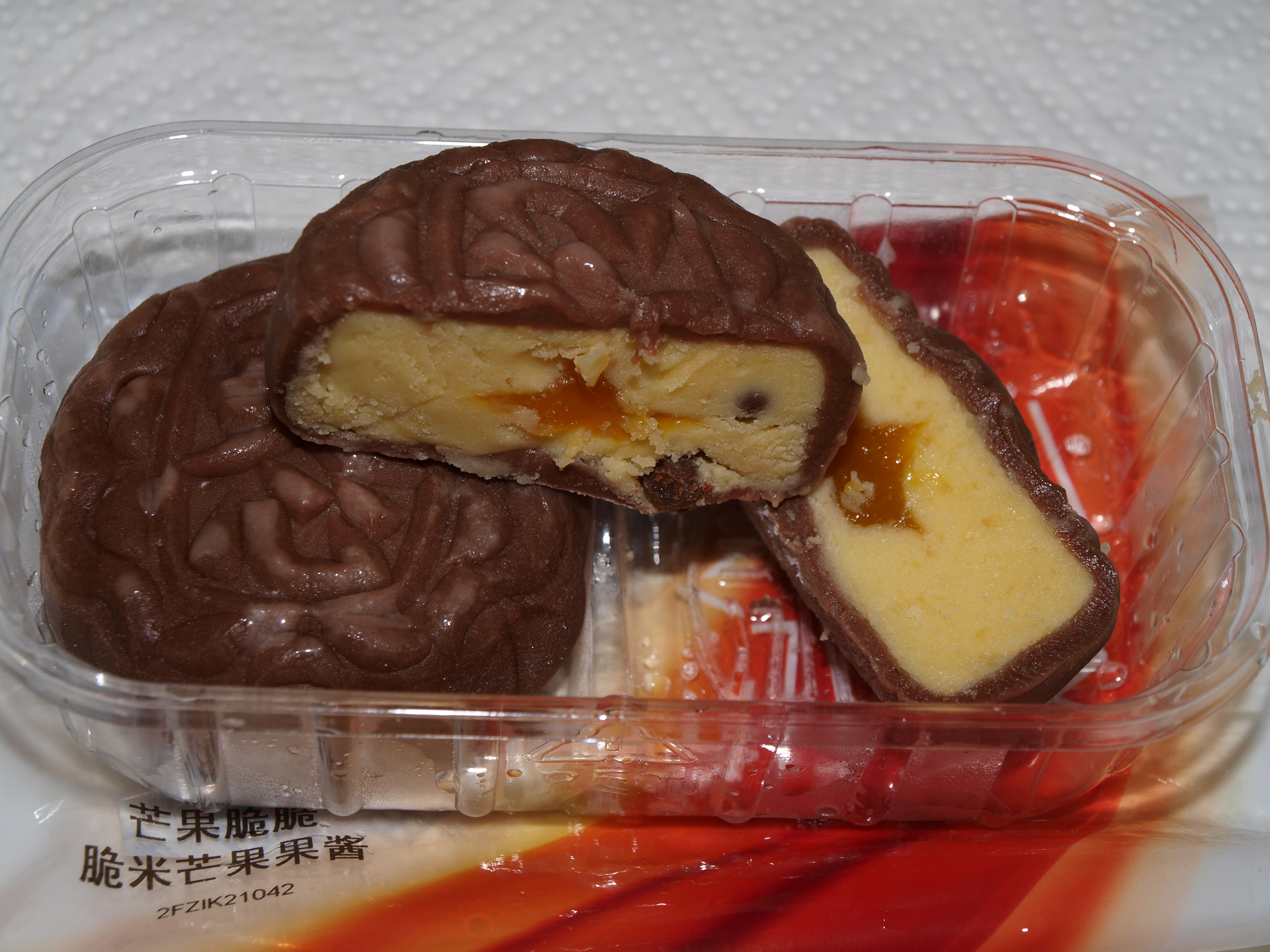
Mango jam and crispy rice

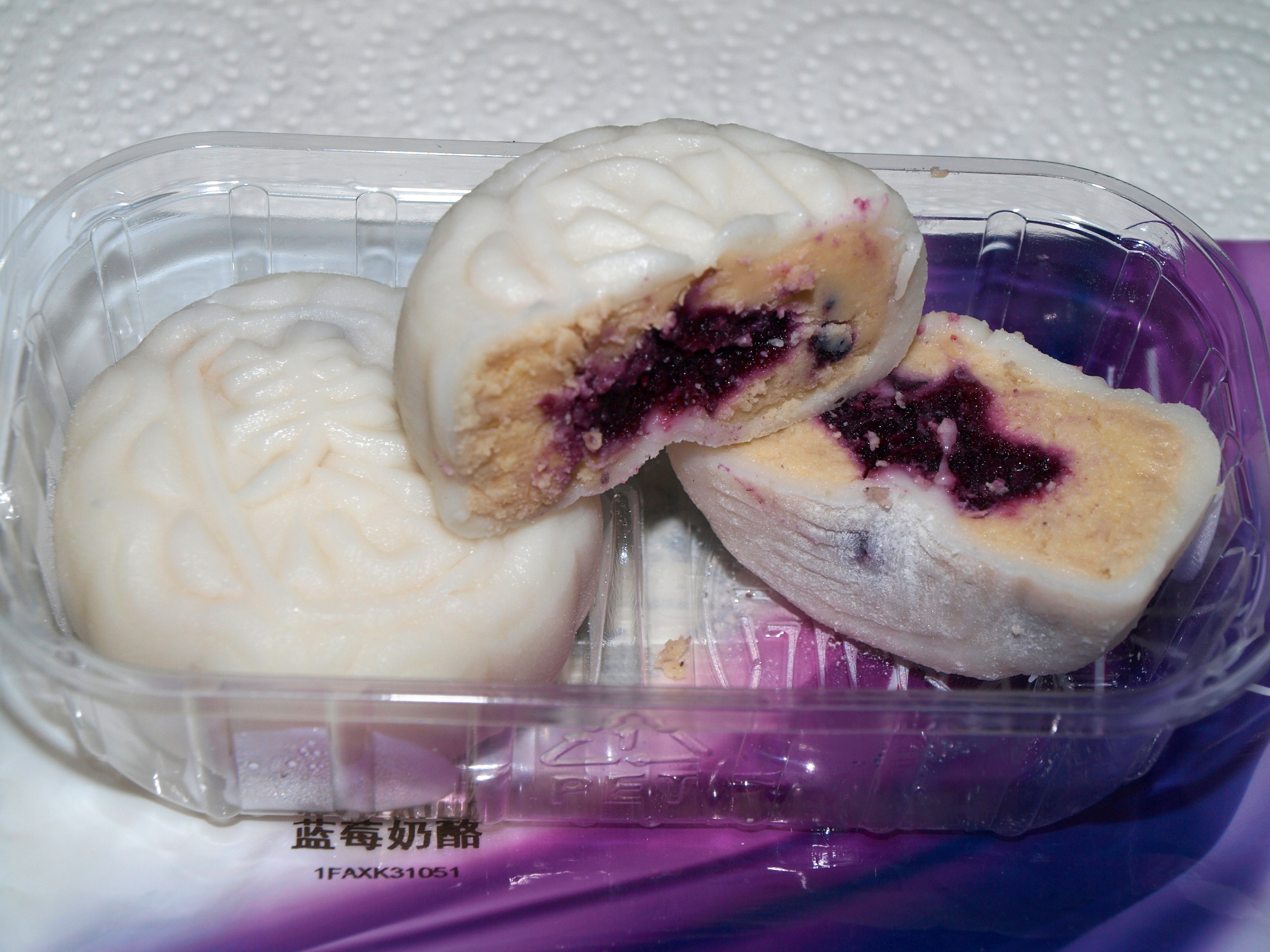
Cheese and blueberry

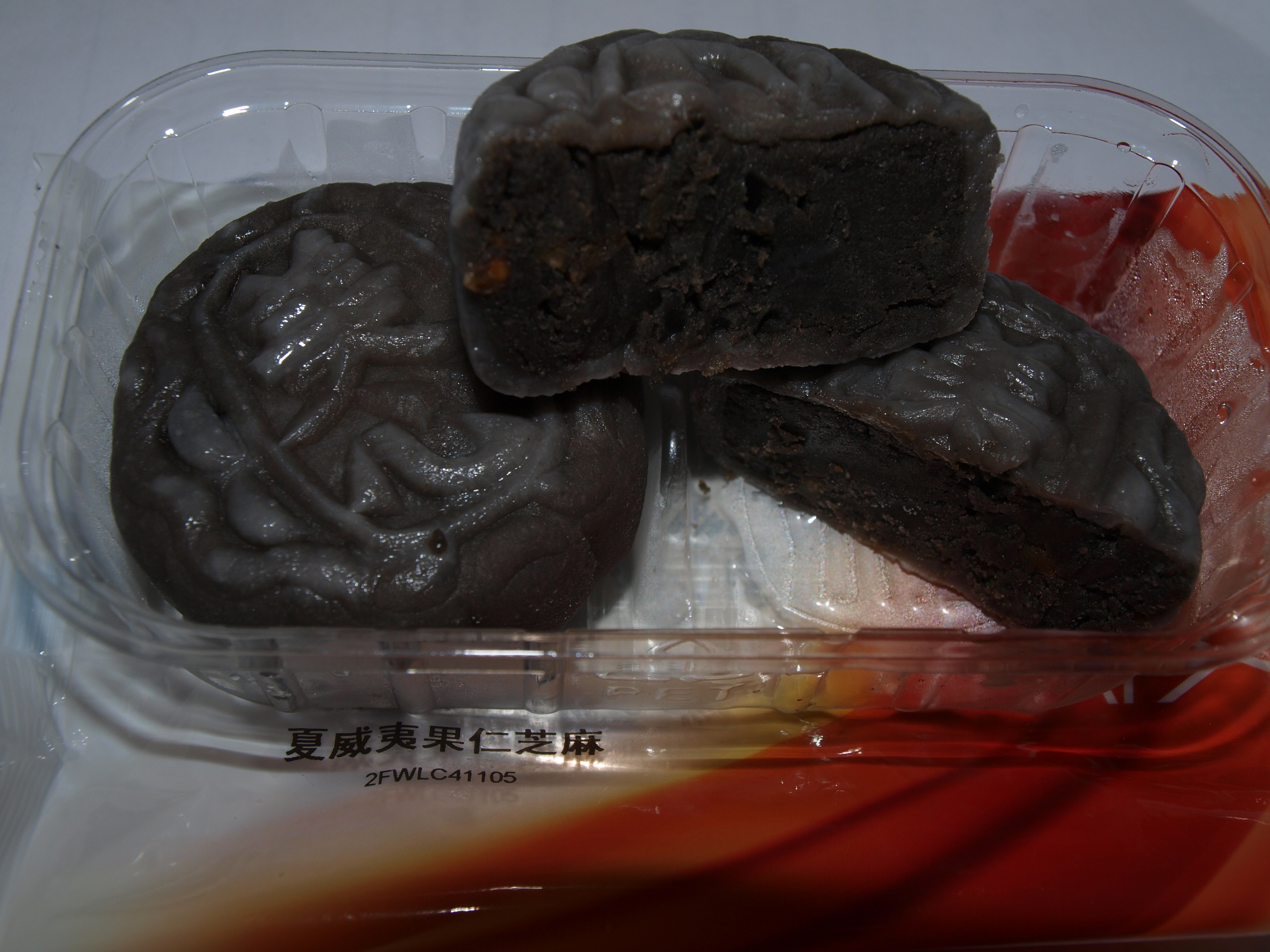
Black sesame and macadamia nuts

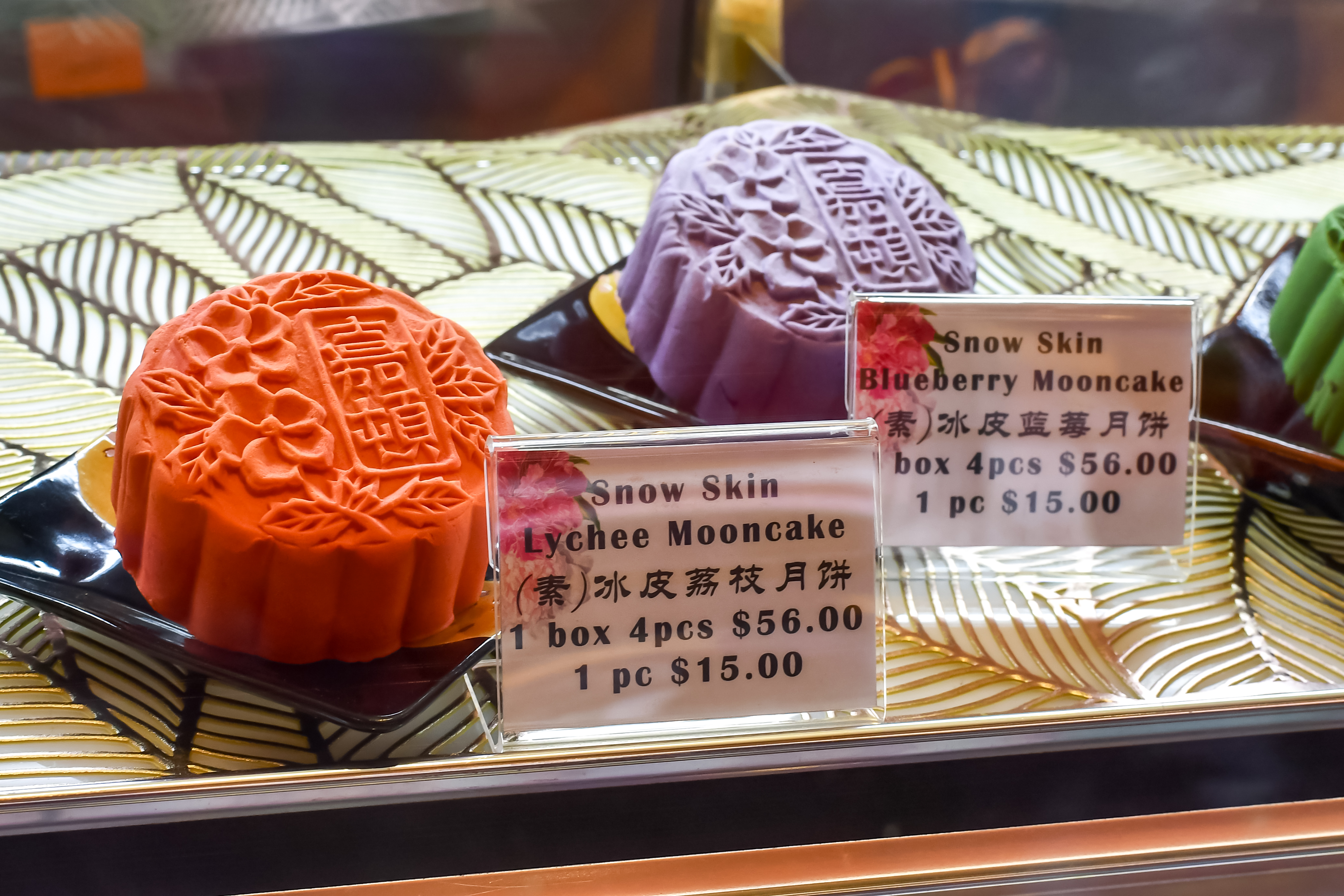

== Production and storage ==
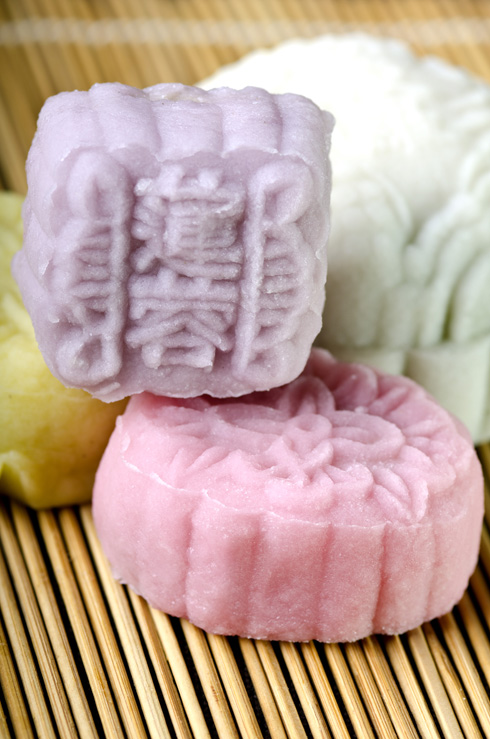
Snow skin mooncakes of various flavors

The requirements of production, storage and transportation for snow skin mooncakes are more stringent than for baked mooncakes. Because snow skin mooncakes are not baked in an oven, high temperatures cannot be used to kill bacteria. Factories have to keep sterile conditions, and many manufacturers are requested to follow HACCP systematic for food safety. The mooncakes are also kept at a low temperature while in storage, shipping and at the retailer to prevent bacteria growing. Snow skin mooncakes were difficult to find in mainland China before the 2000s, because of the need to keep them refrigerated while in transit from the producer to the consumer.

Snow skin mooncakes are usually packaged in plastic bags in pairs or individually. Because they are not baked, snow skin mooncakes must be refrigerated and can be stored in freezer for up to a few weeks. They are typically thawed for a few hours in a refrigerator before serving, to allow them to soften. Thawed mooncakes should be consumed within 2 hours. Refreezing is not advised.

== See also ==
- Mochi ice cream
- Yukimi Daifuku
- List of Chinese desserts
- List of desserts
