= Green tea ice cream =

Japanese ice cream flavor

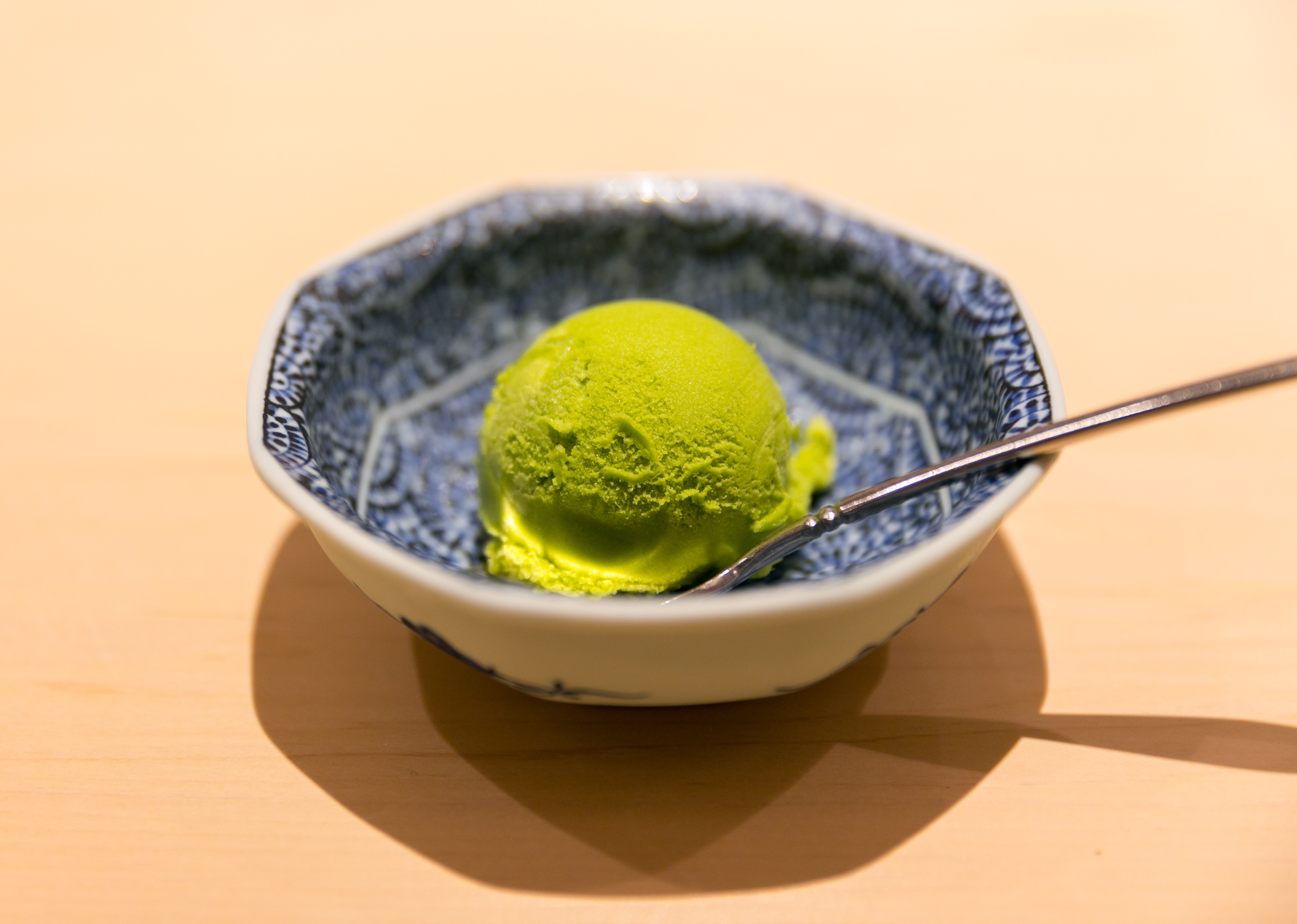
- Matcha ice cream at a Japanese restaurant
- Alternative names: Matcha ice
- Type: Ice cream
- Course: Dessert
- Place of origin: Japan
- Serving temperature: Cold
- Main ingredients: Matcha, ice cream

Green tea ice cream (抹茶アイスクリーム, matcha aisu kurīmu) or matcha ice (抹茶アイス matcha aisu) is ice cream flavored with matcha, or green tea. It is popular in Japan and other parts of East Asia. Matcha ice cream has been available in the United States since the late-1970s, primarily in Japanese restaurants and markets, and became more mainstream in the late 1990s.

In Asia, green tea ice cream is often served in or with other foods, such as monaka, mochi, and shaved ice.

== Overview ==
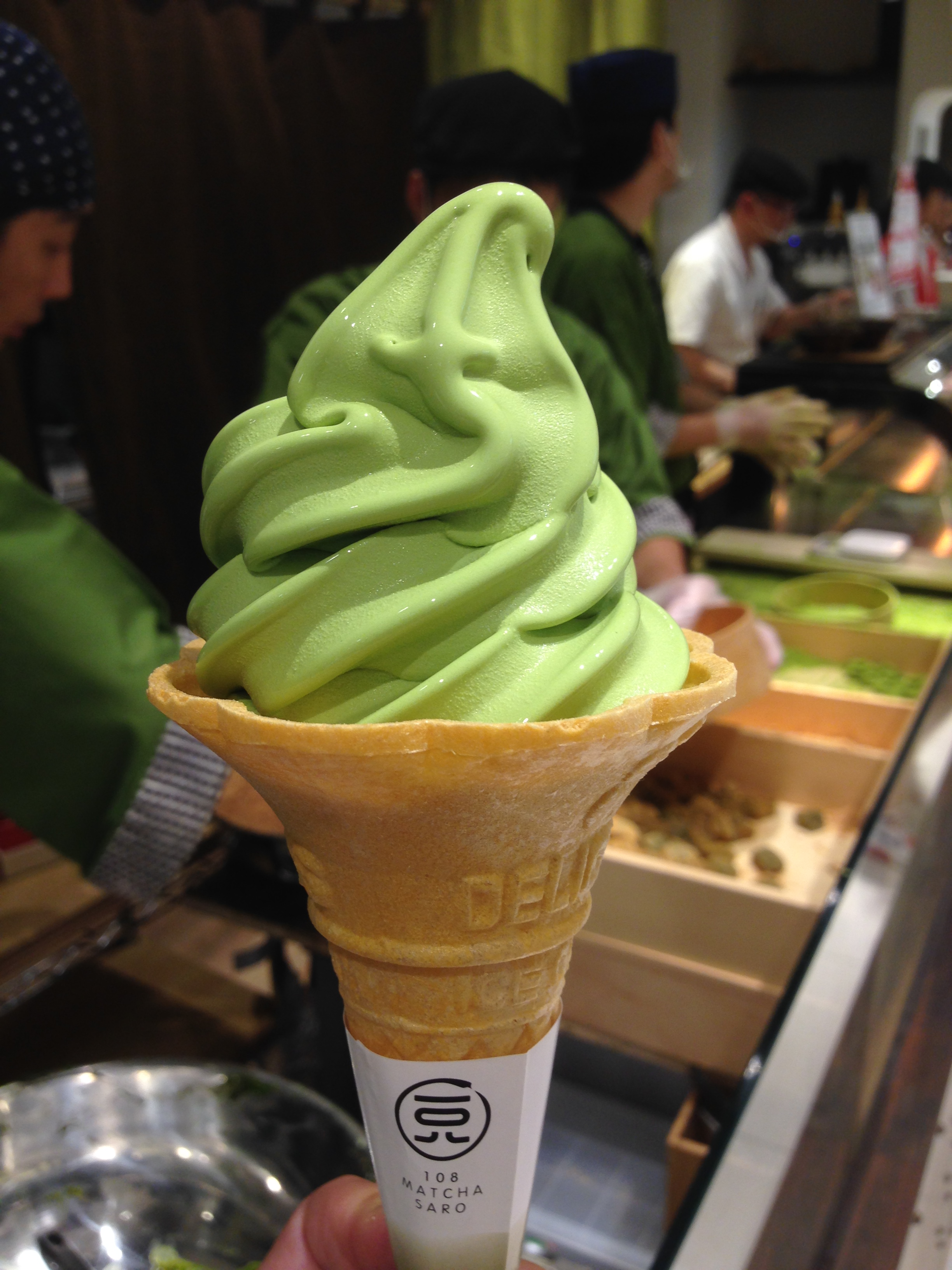
Green tea ice cream cone from Taipei, Taiwan

Matcha is powdered tea made from a special type of green tea called tencha (碾茶). Tencha is a tea grown in the shade and one of the most expensive of all green tea types. It is also used in tea ceremonies in Japan.

Matcha is sweeter and less bitter and is used today in a variety of sweets. In Japan, the Food Labeling Law prohibits the sale of powdered green tea made from any green tea other than tencha as matcha. Calling matcha ice cream simply "green tea ice cream" may be misleading.

== History ==
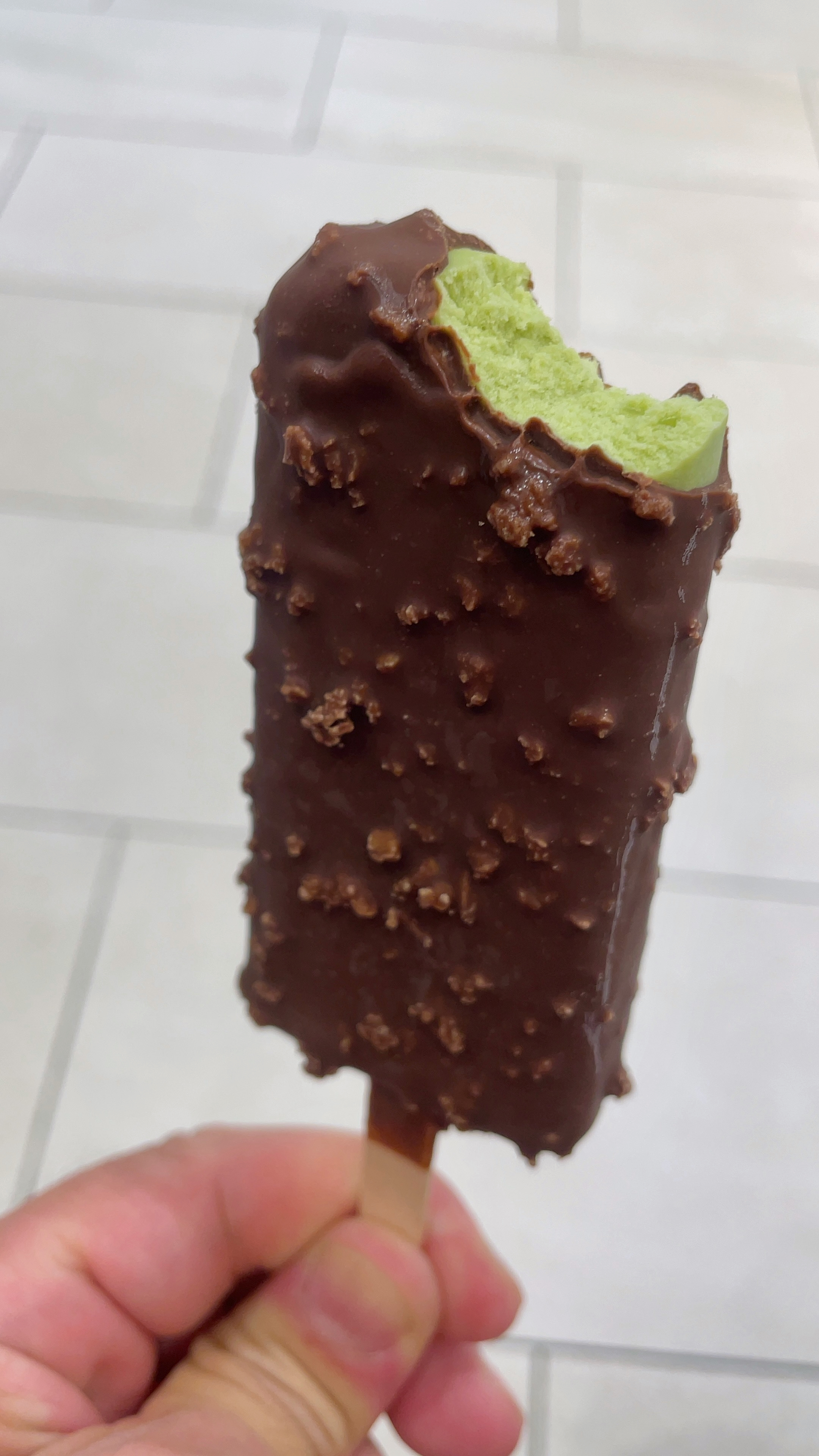
Green tea ice cream bar with chocolate shell

There is a theory that Toyotomi Hideyoshi (1537–1598) ate shaved ice with matcha and millet sugar added. In the Edo period (1603–1867). There was also a shaved ice called Uji Kintoki (宇治金時) with matcha and anko (sweet bean paste) added.

Matcha ice cream was served as ice cream with hikicha (挽茶入氷菓子) at court luncheons and banquets in Japan during the Meiji era. Hikicha (挽茶) means ground tea, i.e., matcha. For example, ice cream with hikicha was listed on the menu of a court banquet for Prince Vittorio Emanuele, Count of Turin, a member of the Italian royal family who visited Japan in 1898. In addition, a 1907 cookbook includes instructions for making tencha ice cream. Tencha (碾茶) is tea before powdered matcha.

Also in 1926, a proposal by a Japanese American living in Texas to advertise matcha in the U.S. with a newspaper ad for "matcha ice cream" was claimed in a Japanese tea industry report.

When Charles Lindbergh of the United States flew to Kasumigaura, Ibaraki Prefecture, in 1931, he was presented with matcha ice cream by the Japanese tea association and was very pleased. He was the first American to eat matcha ice cream on record.

In 1958, a tea company in Wakayama Prefecture developed and sold a soft-serve ice cream containing matcha named "Green Soft." A coffee shop menu book published in 1968 listed matcha ice cream, which was already a standard ice cream served in coffee shops at that time.

In 1983, a confectionery store in Kyoto Prefecture sold matcha ice cream and soft serve. In 1983, Meiji Dairies sold matcha ice cream under the Lady Borden brand (the Japanese brand name of the American Borden Company).

The amount of imported ice cream increased in the Japanese market after the import liberalization act of ice cream in 1990. In 1995, Maeda-en USA in California began selling green tea ice cream in Japan. The same product was soon imported and distributed to convenience stores and supermarkets in Japan as well, and it was introduced in some Japanese newspapers.

Häagen-Dazs Japan started producing green tea ice cream in 1996; it became an immediate hit, having twice as many sales as the previous favorite flavor, vanilla. The product is now sold in Japanese grocery markets and has become one of the company's most popular flavours.

The statistics from the Japanese Ice Cream Association show that green tea ice cream was ranked third in the "Favourite Ice Cream Flavour" study.

== Popularity ==
Green tea ice cream has been available in the United States, the country with the largest ice cream consumption, since the late 1970s, primarily in Japanese restaurants and markets. It is becoming mainstream and can also be made at home.

The U.S. saw rapid growth in Japanese cuisine and sushi popularity in the mid-1990s, which resulted in a big expansion of the Japanese restaurant business in the U.S. This development gradually helped people learn about green tea, resulting in green tea ice cream becoming a typical dessert.

== With other dishes ==
Green tea ice cream is often served with other foods, such azuki beans, dango dumplings, monaka wafers, shaved ice, taiyaki, and so forth.

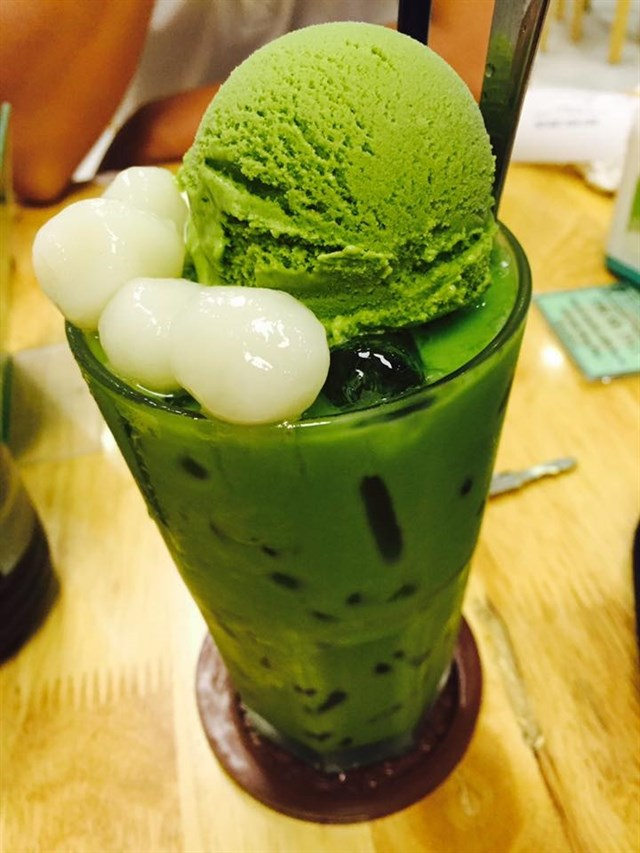
With dango

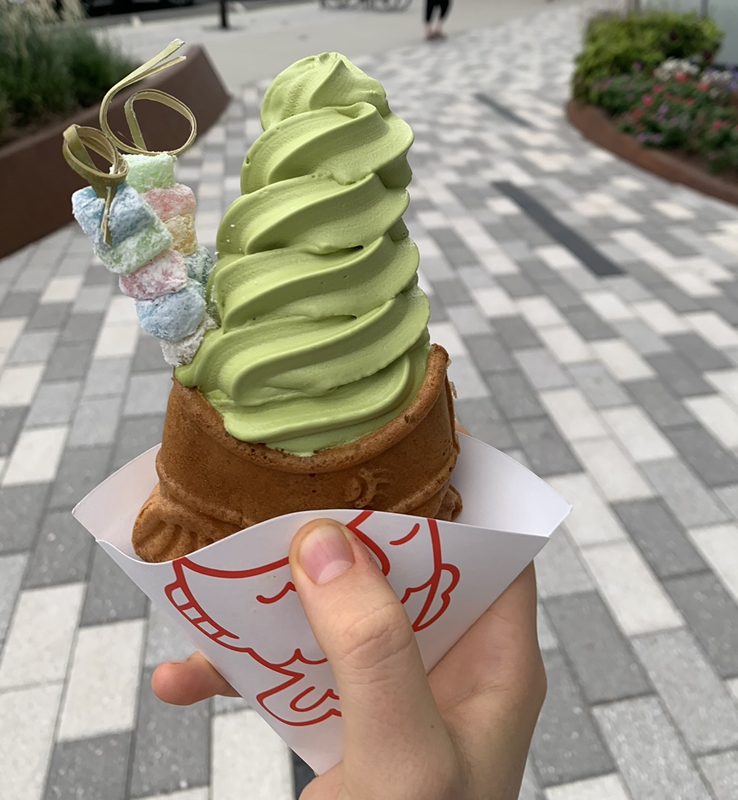
With taiyaki

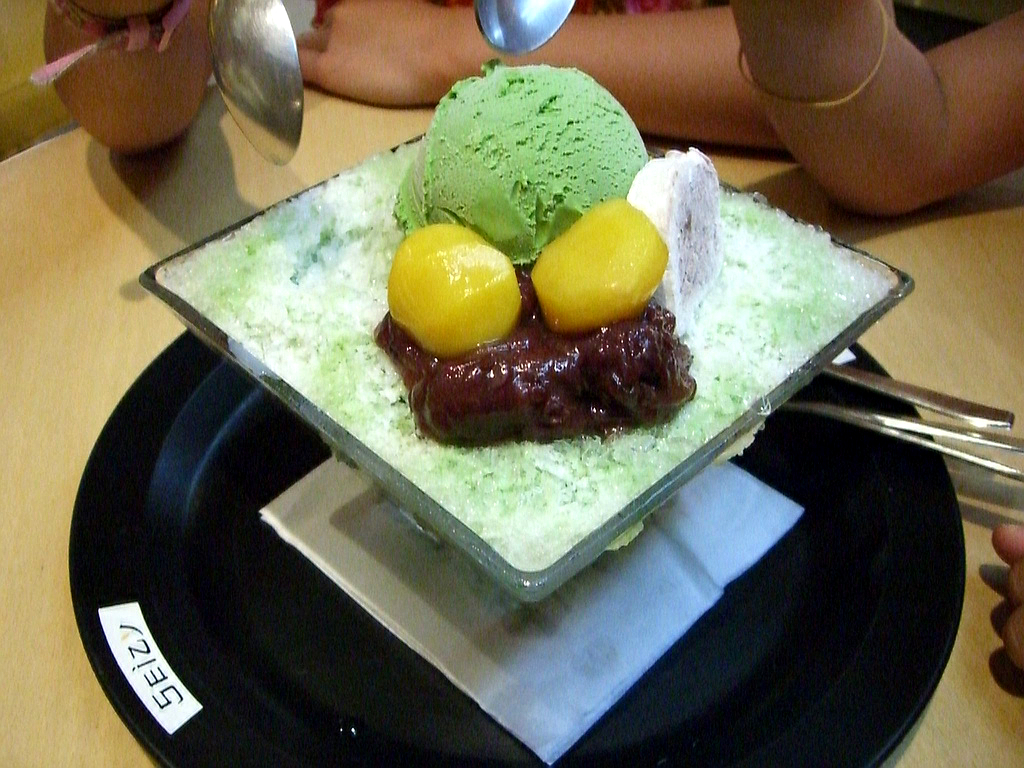
With Korean bingsu

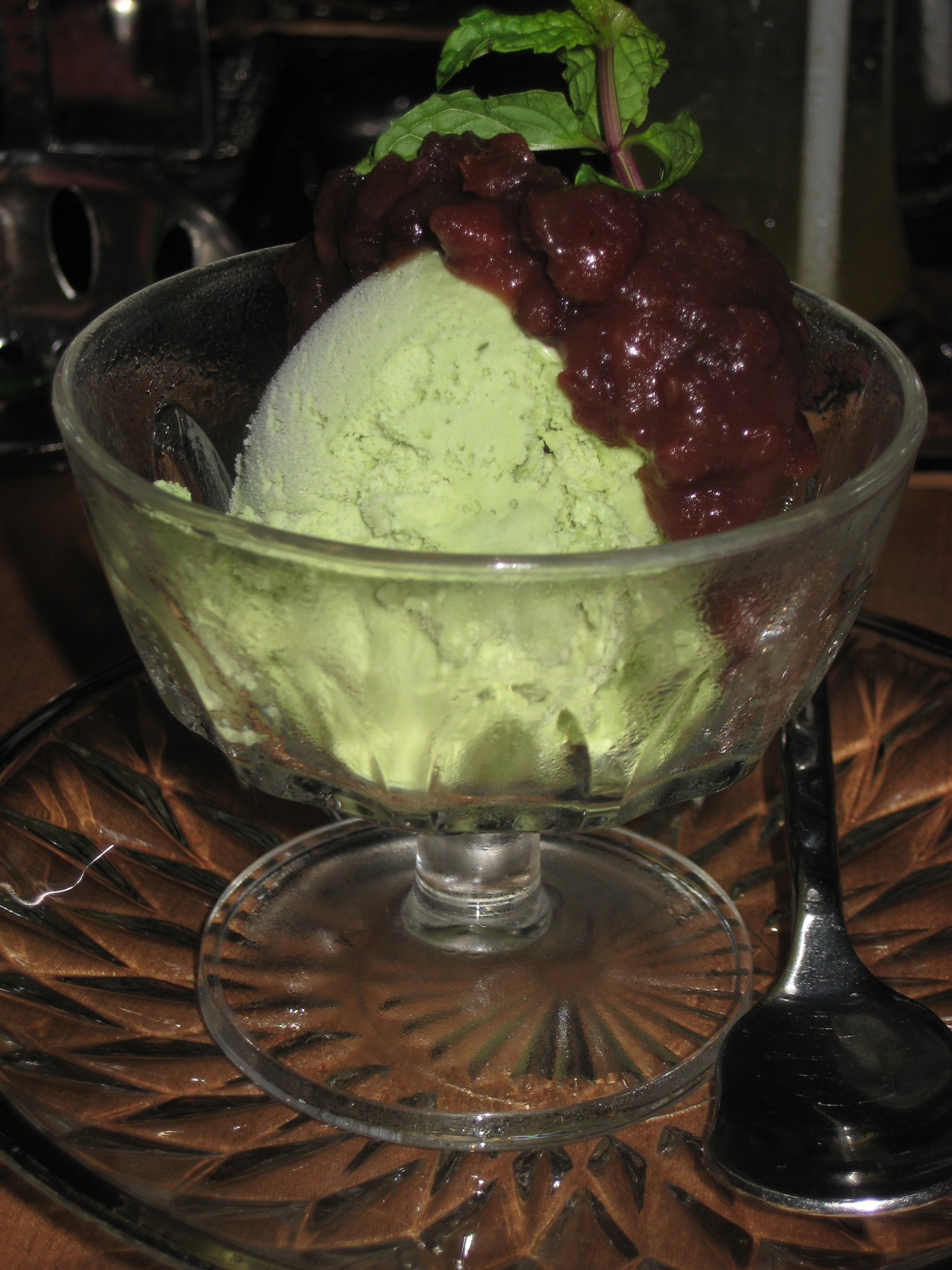
With azuki

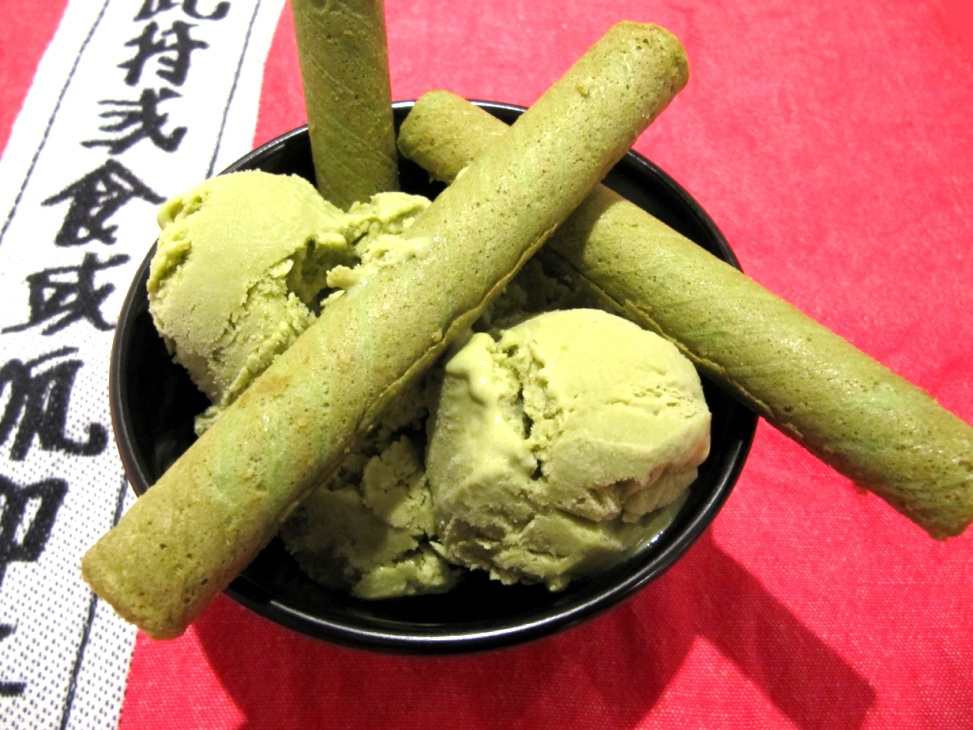
With wafers

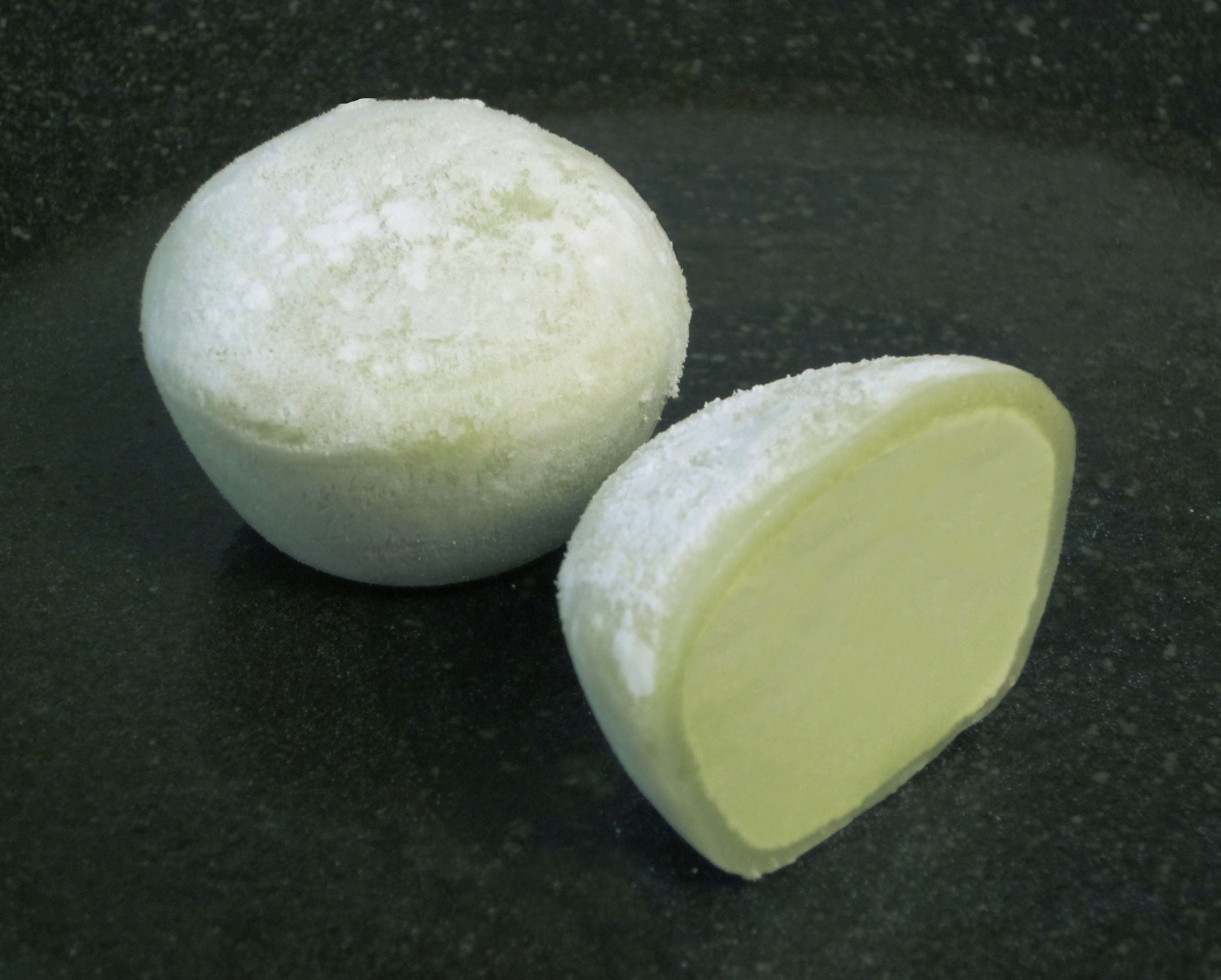
In mochi ice cream

== See also ==
- List of Japanese teas
- List of ice cream flavors
