= Kōhaku maku =

Decorative marking used in Japan

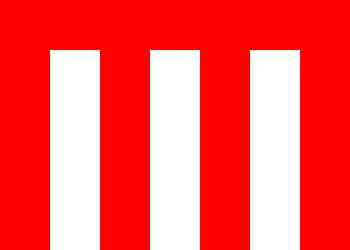
kōhaku pattern

A kōhaku maku (紅白幕, red and white curtain) is a type of decorative fabric panel used on various occasions in Japan. The fabric takes its name from its design of vertical red and white stripes, which is known as kōhaku. Kōhaku maku panels are hung from a red and white striped rope.

Kōhaku maku are hung against walls on to give a festive appearance on formal occasions such as graduation ceremonies, but are also used on less formal occasions such as outdoor tea ceremonies and hanami flower viewing picnics to mark off or decorate spaces.

A type of fabric with a similar pattern in black and white is used for wakes.
