= Ice milk =

Dairy based frozen confectionery

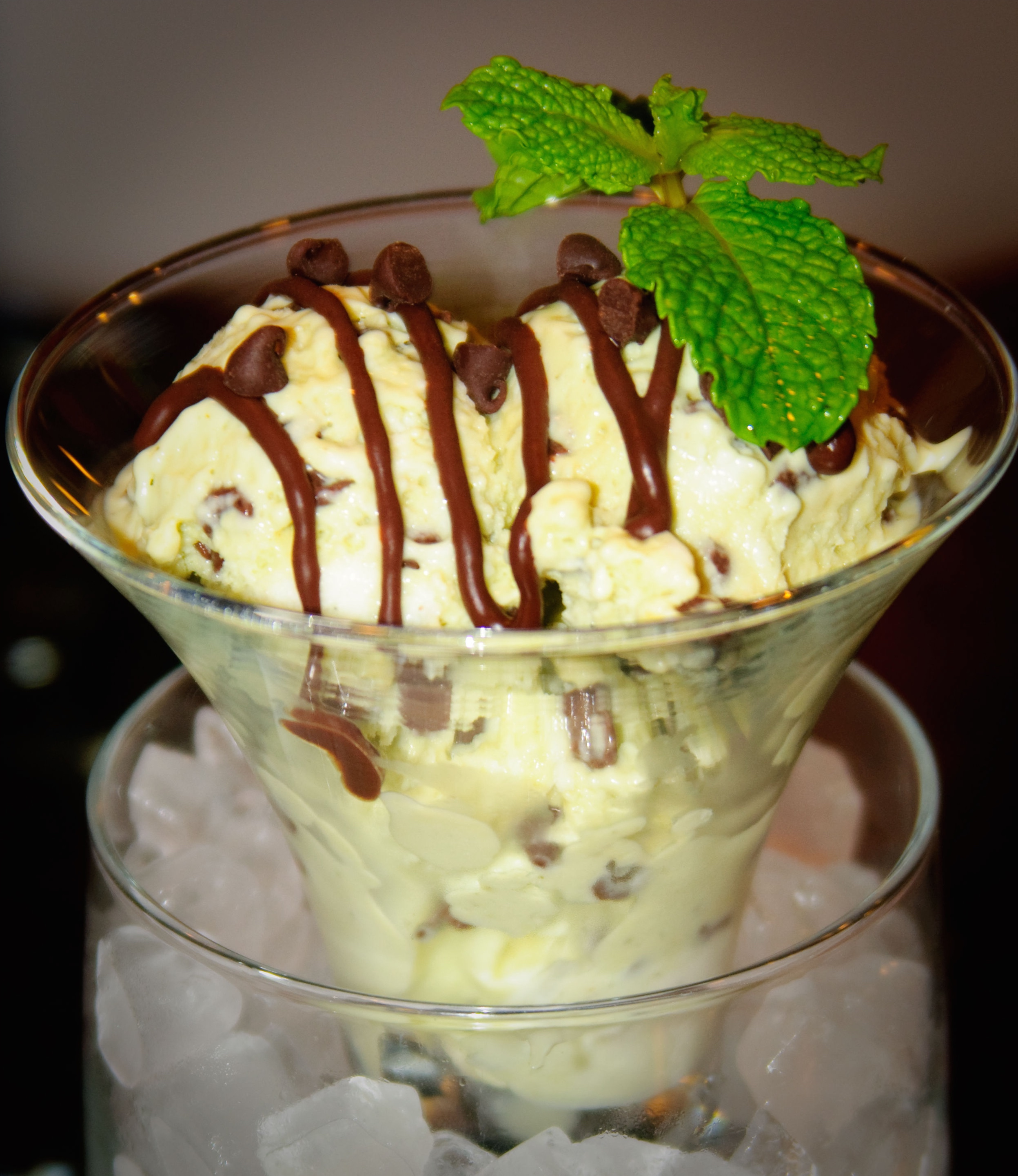
- Mint chocolate chip ice milk
- Alternative names: Iced milk
- Course: Dessert

Ice milk, or iced milk, is a frozen dessert made with frozen dairy milk instead of cream. Ice milk has less milk fat than regular ice cream. Ice milk is sometimes priced lower than ice cream.

In the United States, ice milk is defined as containing less than 10 percent milk fat and the same sweetener amount as ice cream. A 1994 change in United States Food and Drug Administration rules allowed ice milk to be labeled as "non-fat ice cream", "low-fat ice cream", or "light ice cream" in the United States (depending on its fat content). In Canada, ice milk is defined as containing 3%–5% milk fat content, while 5%–7.5% milk fat content would instead be considered "light ice cream"; a product with an undefined milk fat content would be defined simply as a "frozen dairy dessert".
