= Hishi (disambiguation) =

Hishi may refer to:

- Japanese destroyer Hishi
- Hishi mochi, diamond shaped mochi
- Racehorses owned by Masaichiro Abe:
  - Hishi Akebono
  - Hishi Amazon
  - Hishi Miracle
