= Goheimochi =

Mochi made with a sweet and sour sauce

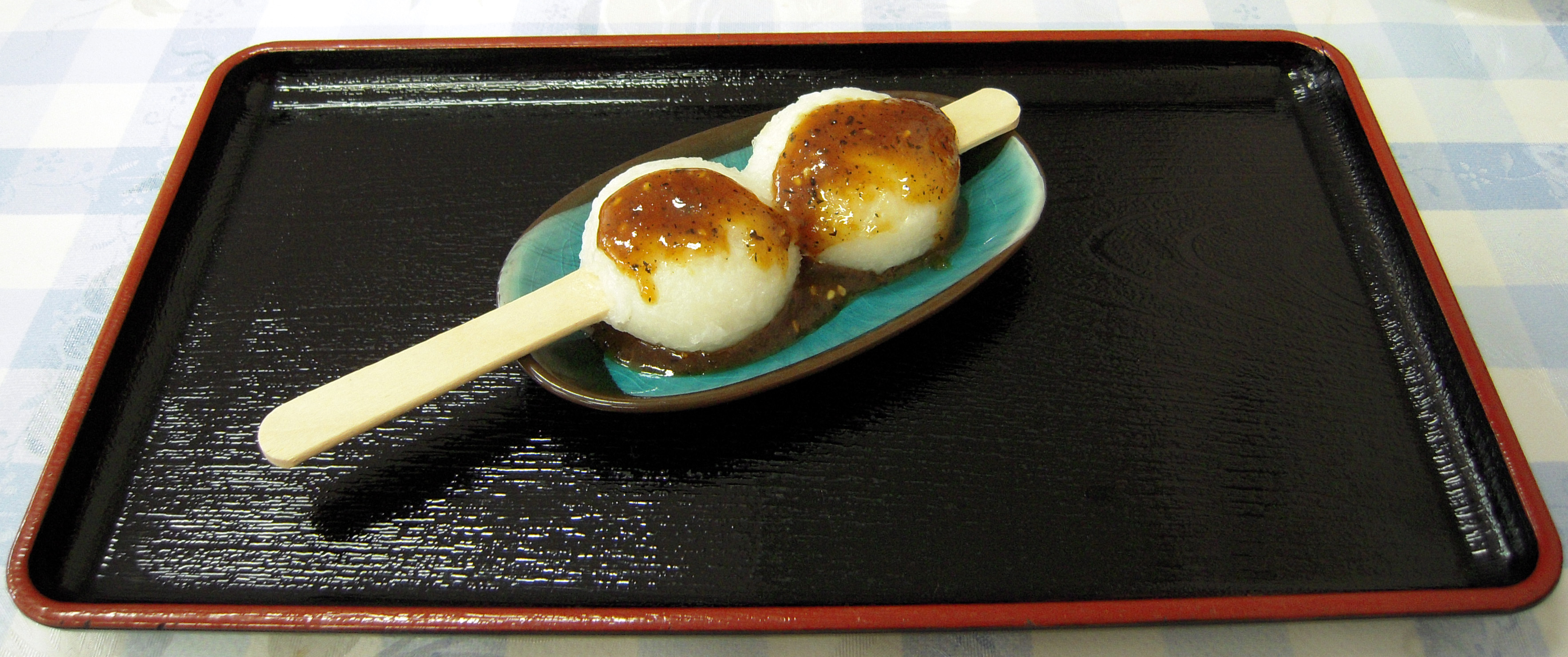
Round goheimochi

Goheimochi (Japanese: 五平餅) is a type of mochi made in the Chubu region of central Japan, specifically in Nagano, Gifu, and Aichi prefectures. Unlike regular mochi it is coated with a type of sweet and sour sauce, usually composed of sugar, soy sauce, and mirin. The mochi is then skewered and grilled. Goheimochi is typically made in one of two shapes: Waraji is shaped like a traditional sandal and rounded mochi is served on a skewer. The mochi is usually only half-cooked so that some grains of rice remain, the rice is usually short-grain rice giving goheimochi a firmer texture compared to standard mochi.

== Varieties ==
Across the Chubu region there are many types of goheimochi. In the Kiso Valley and Hida region, goheimochi is often coated with soy sauce and sugar. In Aichi Prefecture, goheimochi is often covered in miso which is considered the region's specialty. Other examples of goheimochi sauce include honey, walnut, egg, and hachinoko (wasp larvae). Frozen goheimochi is now exported around Japan in vacuum sealed bags and can be found in supermarkets in Japan's larger cities.

== History ==
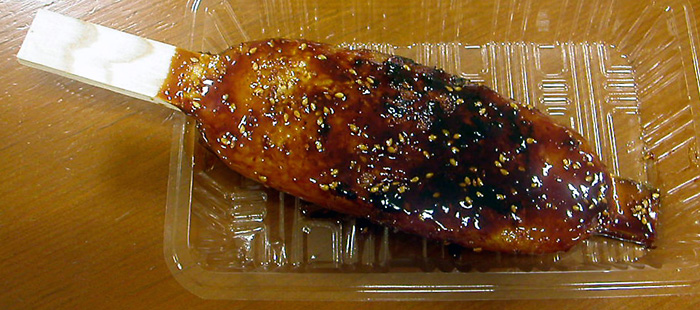
Waraji-shaped goheimochi

Goheimochi was invented in the Edo Period, though its origins are unknown. Despite this there are a few theories regarding the origins of the dish. As the name of the dish is similar to that of Gohei (Shinto streamers) many theorize that the reason the dish was created as a form of money that was offered to Shinto gods. Another theory regarding the origins of the dish is that it came from the Japanese word for lumberjack, Gobei.

== Cultural references ==
In the TV series Half Blue Sky, one of the main characters opens a goheimochi shop. This feature increased the dish's popularity outside of Chubu. The film Your Name is set in the Hida Region and characters are seen eating goheimochi in various scenes.

== See also ==
- Mochi
- Hishi mochi
- Hanabiramochi
- Muchi
- Uirō
- Japanese rice
