= Glutinous rice ball =

Glutinous rice ball may refer to:

- Tangyuan, a Chinese glutinous rice ball cooked in boiling water
- Lo mai chi, a Chinese glutinous rice pastry
- Gyeongdan, a Korean glutinous rice cake

== See also ==
- Rice ball
