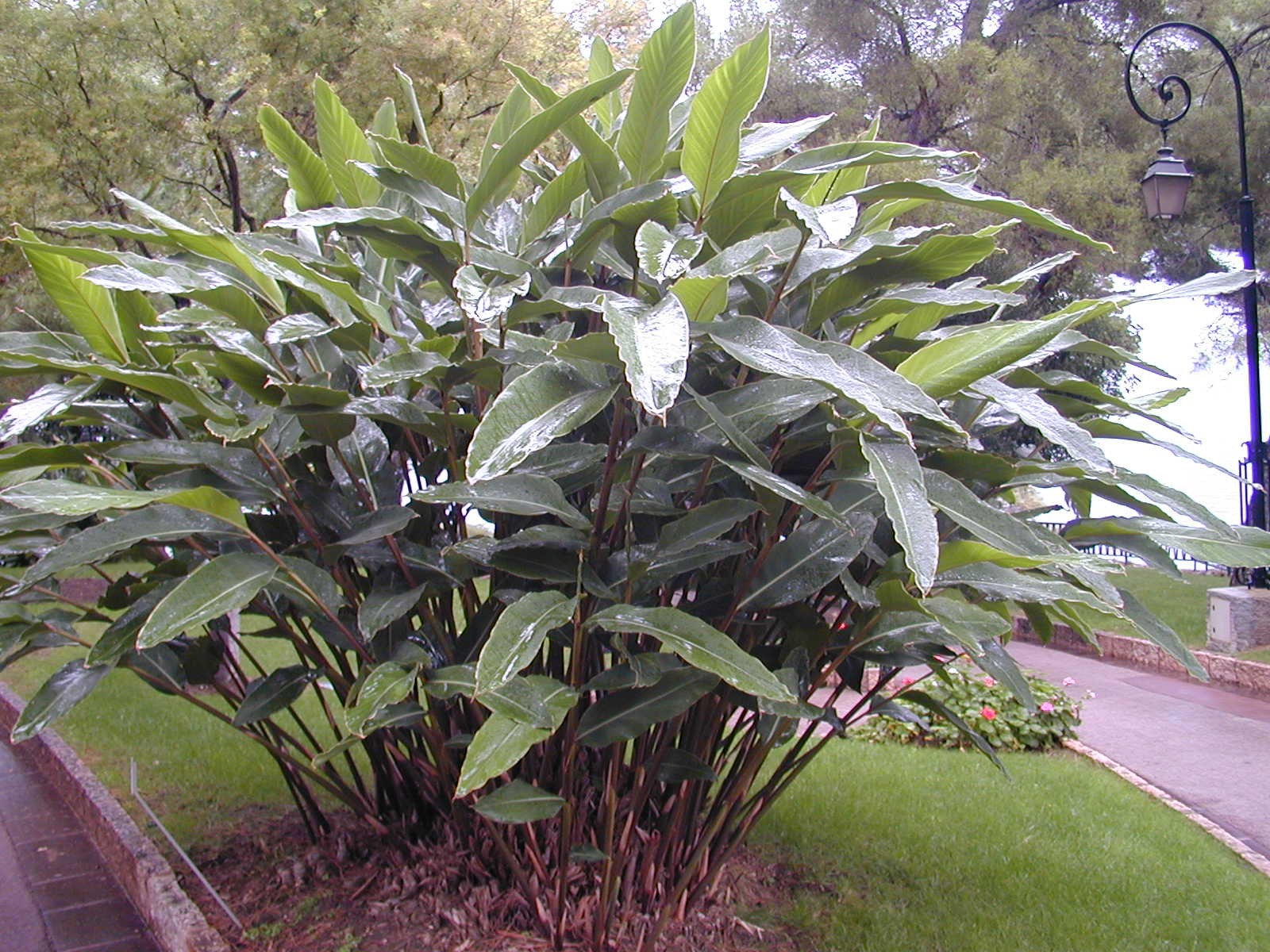
- Alpinia zerumbet as a landscape plant
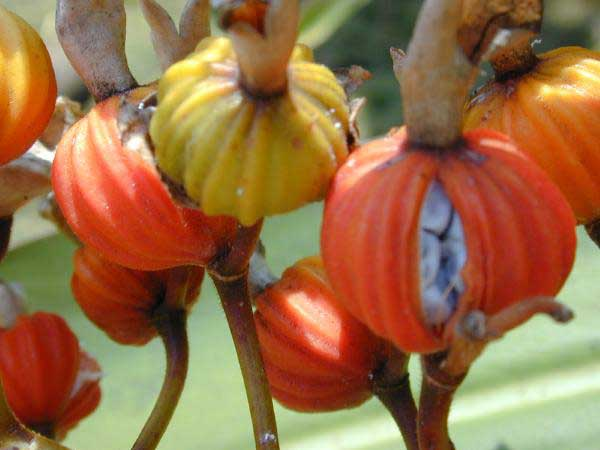
- A. zerumbet fruit dehiscing.

Conservation status
- Data Deficient (IUCN 3.1)

Scientific classification
- Kingdom: Plantae
- Clade: Tracheophytes
- Clade: Angiosperms
- Clade: Monocots
- Clade: Commelinids
- Order: Zingiberales
- Family: Zingiberaceae
- Genus: Alpinia
- Species: A. zerumbet

Binomial name
- Alpinia zerumbet (Pers.) B.L.Burtt and R.M.Sm.

Synonyms
- Alpinia cristata Griff.; Alpinia engleriana K.Schum.; Alpinia fimbriata Gagnep.; Alpinia fluvitialis Hayata; Alpinia nutans var. longiramosa Gagnep.; Alpinia nutans K.Schum., nom. illeg. homonym. post.; Alpinia oceanica Burkill; Alpinia penicillata Roscoe; Alpinia rechingeri (Gagnep.) Loes., nom. illeg. homonym. post.; Alpinia schumanniana Valeton; Alpinia speciosa var. longiramosa Gagnep.; Alpinia speciosa (J.C.Wendl.) K.Schum., nom. illeg. homonym. post.; Amomum nutans (Andrews) Schult.; Catimbium speciosum (J.C.Wendl.) Holttum; Costus zerumbet Pers.; Guillainia rechingeri Gagnep.; Languas schumanniana (Valeton) Sasaki; Languas speciosa (J.C.Wendl.) Small; Renealmia nutans Andrews; Renealmia spectabilis Rusby; Zerumbet speciosum J.C.Wendl.

= Alpinia zerumbet =

Species of flowering plant

Alpinia zerumbet, commonly known as shell ginger among other names, is a perennial species of ginger native to East Asia. The plants can grow up to 2.5 to 3 meters (8 to 10 ft) tall and bear colorful funnel-shaped flowers. They are grown as ornamentals and their leaves are used in cuisine and traditional medicine.

== Names ==
Alpinia zerumbet is called a "shell ginger" or "shell flower" most commonly, because its individual pink flowers, especially when in bud, resemble sea shells. Other common names in English include "pink porcelain lily", "variegated ginger, and "light galangal".

In Japan, A. zerumbet is called gettō (ゲットウ [月桃]) in standard Japanese. In the languages of the Ryukyu Islands, it is known as sannin (サンニン) on Okinawa, shanin (シャニン) on Tanegashima in the Ōsumi Islands, sa'nen (サネン) on Amami Ōshima, sani (サニ) on Okinoerabujima, samin (サミン) on Miyako-jima, samin (サミン), sa'nin (サニン) and sami (サミ) on Ishigaki Island, sami (サミ) on Taketomi Island and sa'nin (サニン) on Iriomote Island. It is known as souka (ソウカ) on Chichijima in the Bonin Islands and sōka (ソーカ) in the Daitō Islands east of the Ryukyus.

In Taiwan, A. zerumbet is called yuètáo (月桃) in Mandarin Chinese, hó͘-chú-hoe (虎子花) or ge̍h-thô/go̍eh-thô (月桃) in Taiwanese Hokkien kiéu-kiông (枸薑) or ngie̍t-thò (月桃) in Siyen Hakka. In the island's aboriginal languages, it is known as silu in Bunun, jiaboe and garyo in Paiwan, bussiyan, bissiyan and bassiyan in Atayal and lalengac in Sakizaya.

In China, it is called yànshānjiāng (艷山薑), as well as yùtáo (玉桃), cǎoběn zhíwù (草本植物) and dà húluóbo (大胡蘿蔔) among other names.

== Characteristics ==
Native to eastern Asia, Alpinia zerumbet is a rhizomatous, evergreen tropical perennial that grows in upright clumps 8 to 10 ft (2.4 to 3.0 m) tall in tropical climates. It bears funnel-formed flowers. Flowers have white or pink perianths with yellow labella with red spots and stripes. There are three stamens, but only one has pollen. There is one pistil. The fruit is globose with many striations. In more typical conditions, it reaches 4 to 8 ft (1.2 to 2.4 m) feet tall in the green house, and 3 to 4 ft (0.91 to 1.22 m) feet tall, as a house plant.

It was originally called Alpinia speciosa, which was also the scientific name of torch ginger. To avoid the confusion, it was renamed A. zerumbet while torch ginger was reclassified in the genus Etlingera. No species is accepted as A. speciosa today.

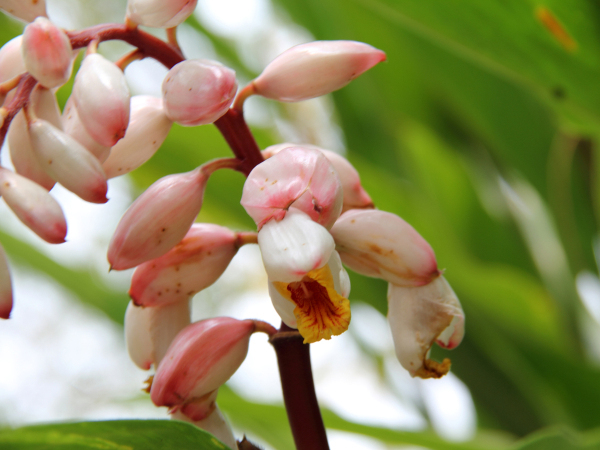
Alpinia zerumbet

== Cultivation ==
Alpinia zerumbet is best grown in rich medium-wet, to wet well drained soils in full sun to part shade. Afternoon shade in hot summer climates, is recommended. Indoors, the plant must have bright light and humid conditions. Flowering rarely occurs before the second year.

== Uses ==
The long leaf blades of A. zerumbet are used for wrapping zongzi, a traditional Chinese dish made of rice stuffed with different fillings. In Okinawa, Japan, its leaves are sold for making an herbal tea and are also used to flavor noodles and wrap muchi rice cakes.

A 2013 publication found A. zerumbet leaf extract increased the lifespan of C. elegans by 22.6%. Recent research has investigated its effects on human longevity and the phytochemicals that may be responsible.

A. zerumbet contains many kavalactones structurally related to the compounds in kava (Piper methysticum) and may help prevent high glucose induced cell damage in human umbilical vein endothelial cells.

== Gallery ==
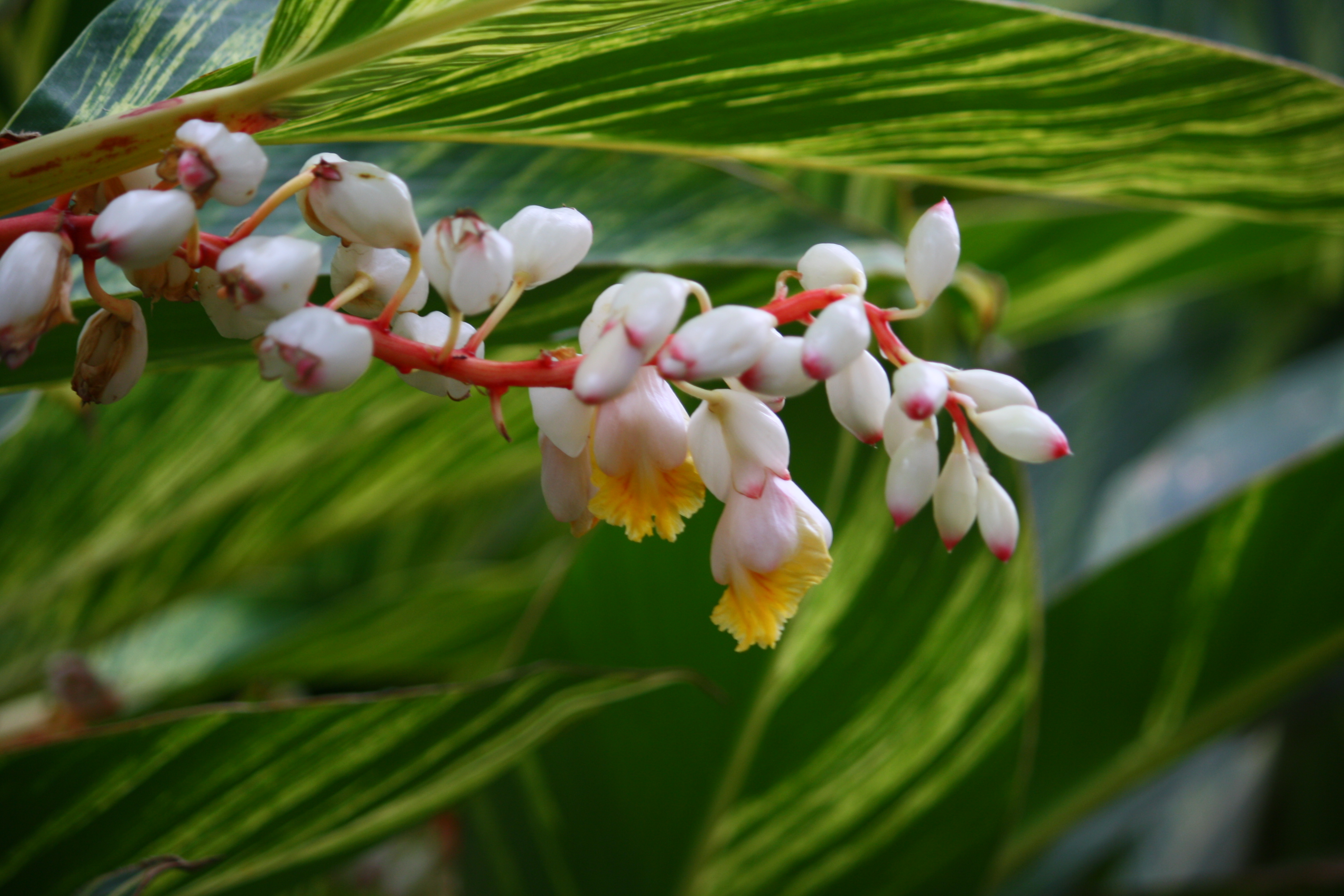
Flowers of Alpinia zerumbet, the shell ginger

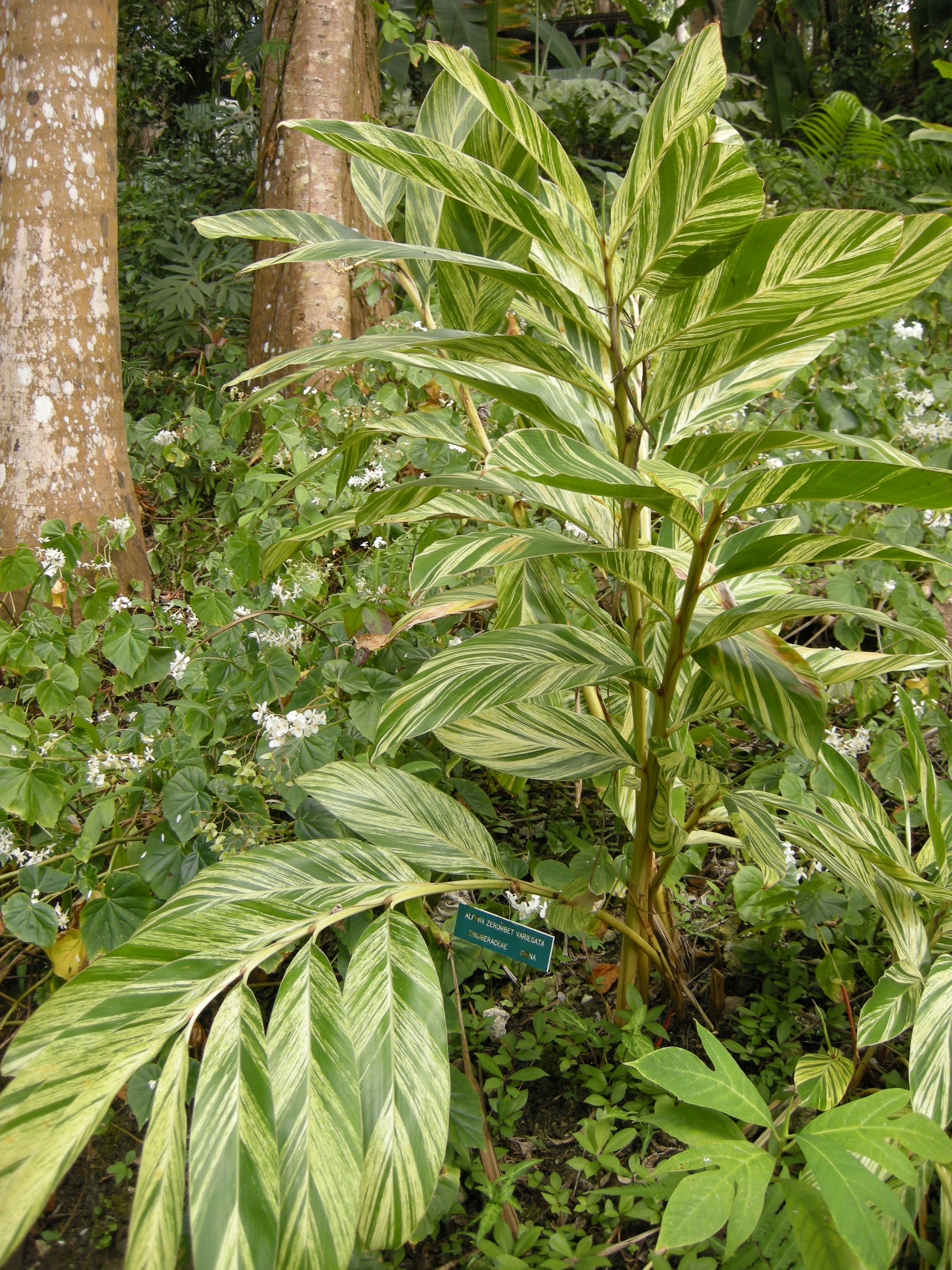
Alpinia zerumbet variegata, cultivated for ornamental use

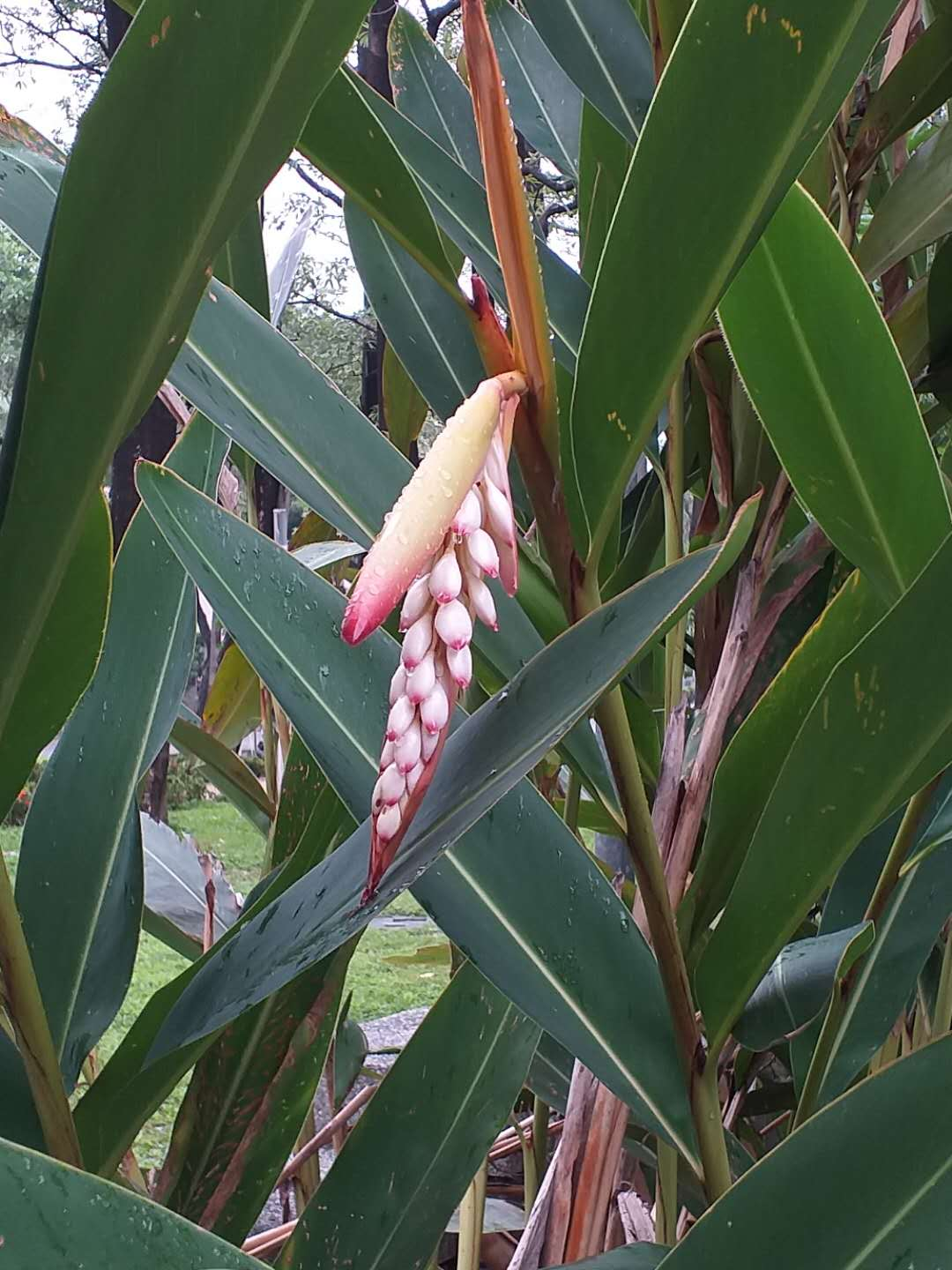
A. zerumbet inflorescence protected by two bracts before flower bloom

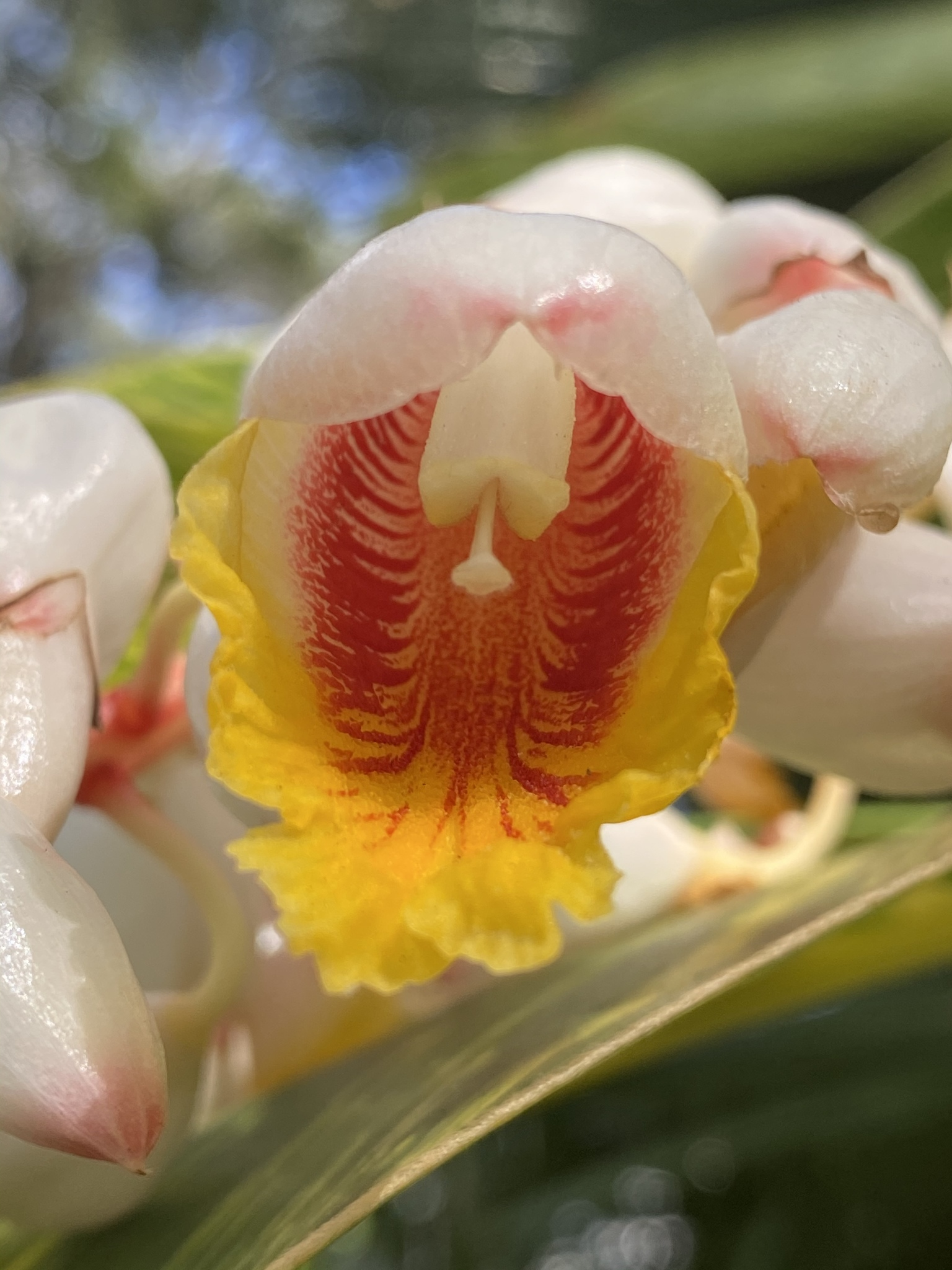
A closeup of the A. zerumbet flower with its shell shape

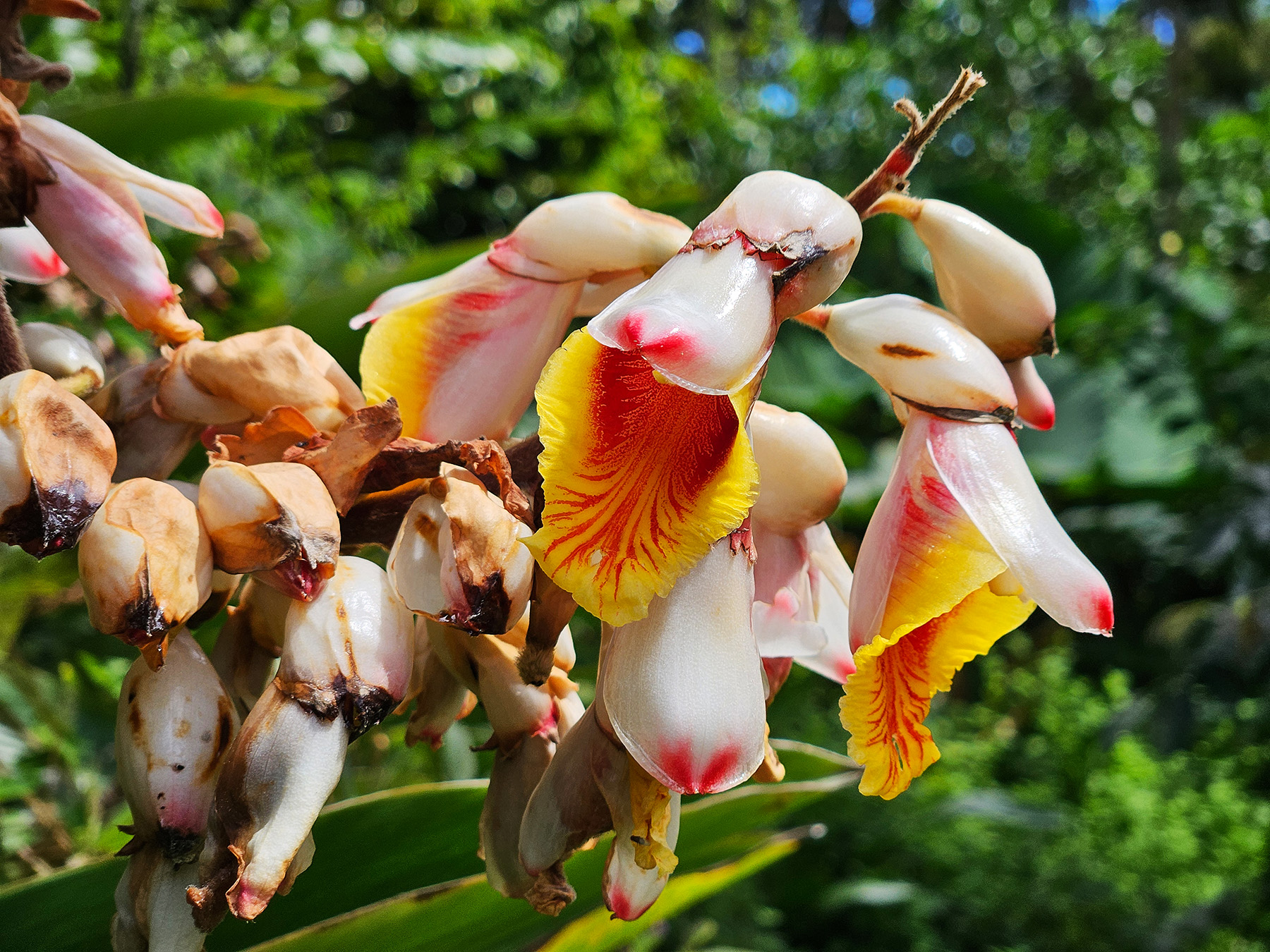
Alpinia zerumbet (Pers.) B.L.Burtt & R.M.Sm., Hawaii

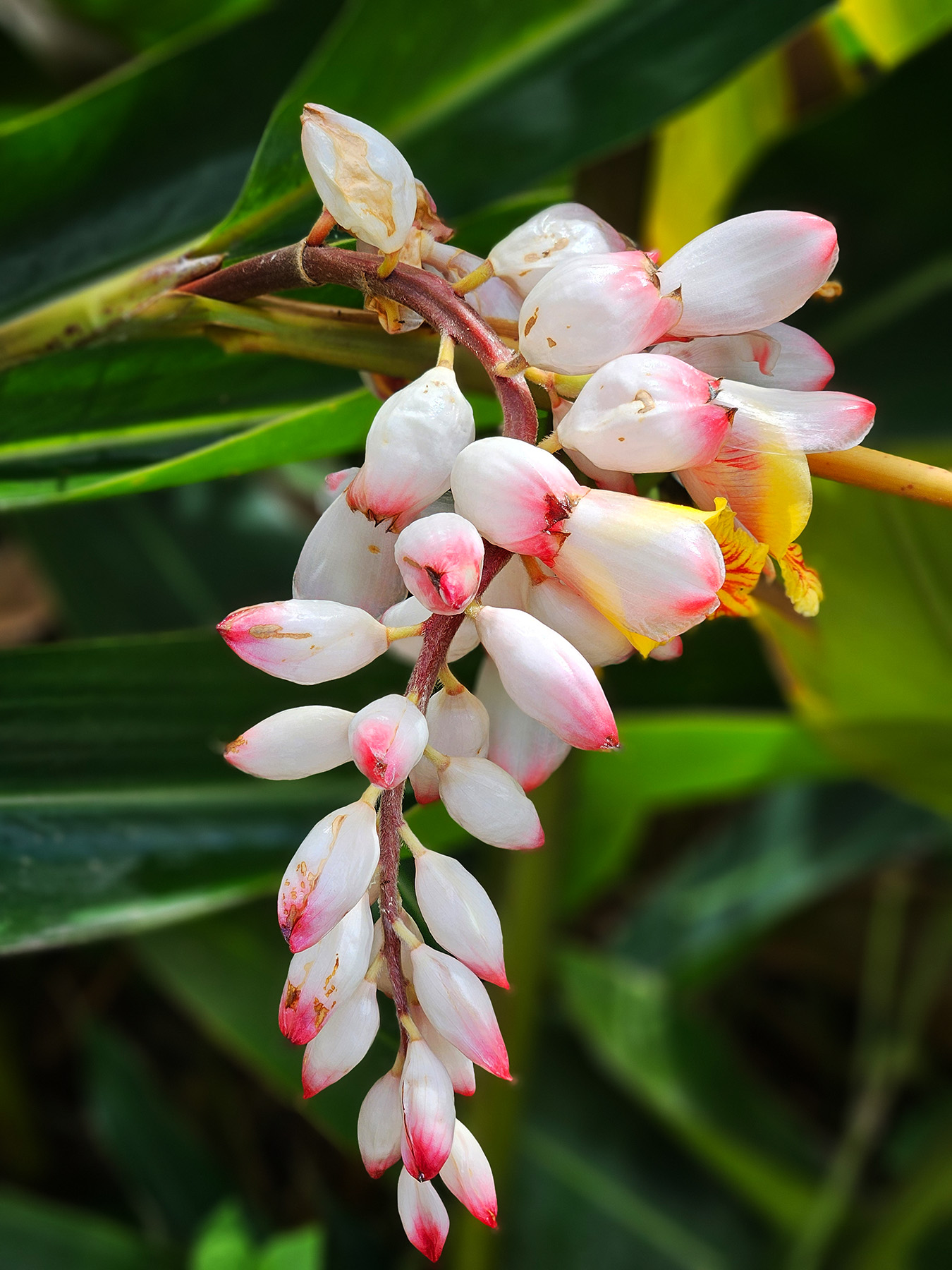
Alpinia zerumbet, Hawaii (island)
