= Mochi =

Japanese rice cake

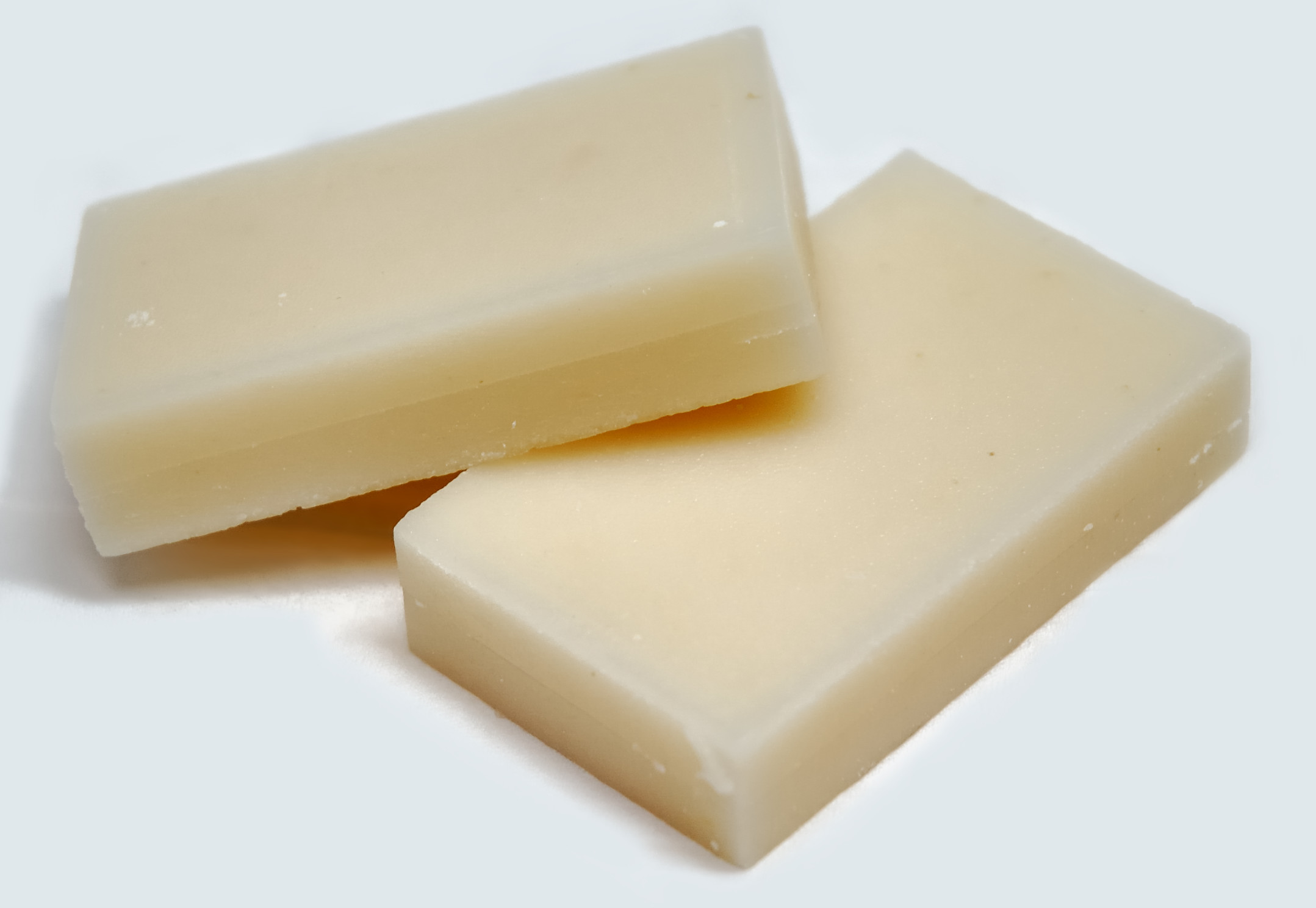
Rice cake kirimochi or kakumochi

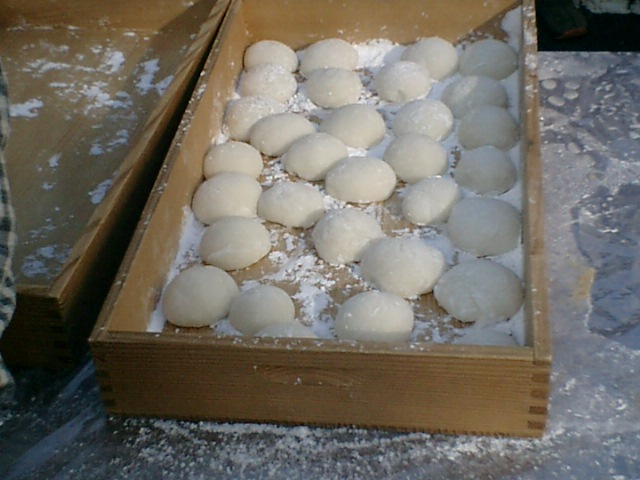
Rice cake marumochi

Fresh mochi being pounded

Mochi (/ˈmoʊtʃiː/ MOH-chee; もち, 餅 [motɕi]) is a Japanese rice cake made of mochigome (もち米), a short-grain japonica glutinous rice, and sometimes other ingredients such as water, sugar, and cornstarch. The steamed rice is pounded into paste and molded into the desired shape. In Japan, it is traditionally made in a ceremony called mochitsuki (餅搗き). While eaten year-round, mochi is a traditional food for the Japanese New Year, and is commonly sold and eaten during that time.

Mochi is made up of polysaccharides, lipids, protein, and water. Mochi has a varied structure of amylopectin gel, starch grains, and air bubbles. In terms of starch content, the rice used for mochi is very low in amylose and has a high amylopectin level, producing a gel-like consistency. The protein content of the japonica rice used to make mochi is higher than that of standard short-grain rice.

Mochi is similar to dango, which is made with rice flour instead of pounded rice grains.

== History ==
Red rice was the original variant used in the production of mochi. The cultural significance of mochi in Japan is unique, though it has elements in common with other auspicious foods in other Asian countries. According to archaeological research, the homemade production of mochi increased beginning in the 6th century (Asuka period), when earthenware steamers became popular in every household, mainly in eastern Japan.

In the Bungo no kuni fudoki, compiled in the late 8th century in the Nara period, a legend concerning mochi was described. According to the book, when a rich man made a flat mochi from leftover rice and shot an arrow at it, the mochi transformed into a white bird and flew away, and after that, the man's rice field became desolate and barren. This legend shows that round white mochi was historically held to have spiritual power.

In the Heian period (794–1185), mochi was often used in Shinto events to celebrate childbirth and marriage. According to the Ōkagami compiled in the 12th century, emperors and nobilities used to put mochi into the mouths of babies that were 50 days old. In this period, it became customary in aristocratic society for the bride and groom to eat mochi together at the bride's house three days after the wedding.

The first recorded accounts of mochi being used as a part of New Year's festivities are from the Heian period. The nobles of the Imperial court believed that long strands of freshly made mochi symbolized long life and well-being, while dried mochi helped strengthen one's teeth. Accounts of it can also be found in The Tale of Genji.

The custom of kagami mochi (mirror mochi) began among the samurai class during the Muromachi period. Kagami mochi are composed of two spheres of mochi stacked on top of one another, topped with a bitter orange (daidai). In welcoming the New Year, samurai decorated kagami mochi with Japanese armor and Japanese swords and would place them in the tokonoma (alcove in a traditional Japanese room where art or flowers are displayed) to pray for the prosperity of their families in the New Year. When people ate kagami mochi after the New Year period, they avoided cutting it with a hōchō (knife) so as not to violate the kami, and smashed it with a wooden hammer after it naturally dried and cracked.

To this point, most mochi was made without sweetener. This began to change in the 17th century as Western confections were introduced by the Portuguese, and over the following two centuries sweetened confections were adopted into the diets of Japan's social elite, who held high sugar content up as a status symbol. To accommodate the increased demand, domestic sugar production was increased beginning in the mid-18th century, and a century later the now more accessible sweetened mochi became popular among the general public. For those who could afford it, such mochi was made from white sugar; for the rest, brown sugar was used.

Mochi continues to be one of the traditional foods eaten around Japanese New Year and is sold and consumed in abundance around this time. A kagami mochi is placed on family altars (kamidana) on December 28 each year.

== Seasonal specialties ==
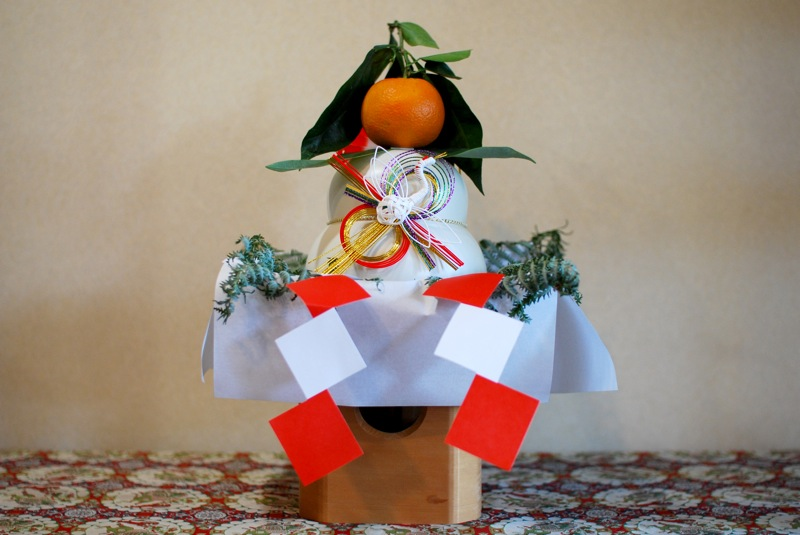
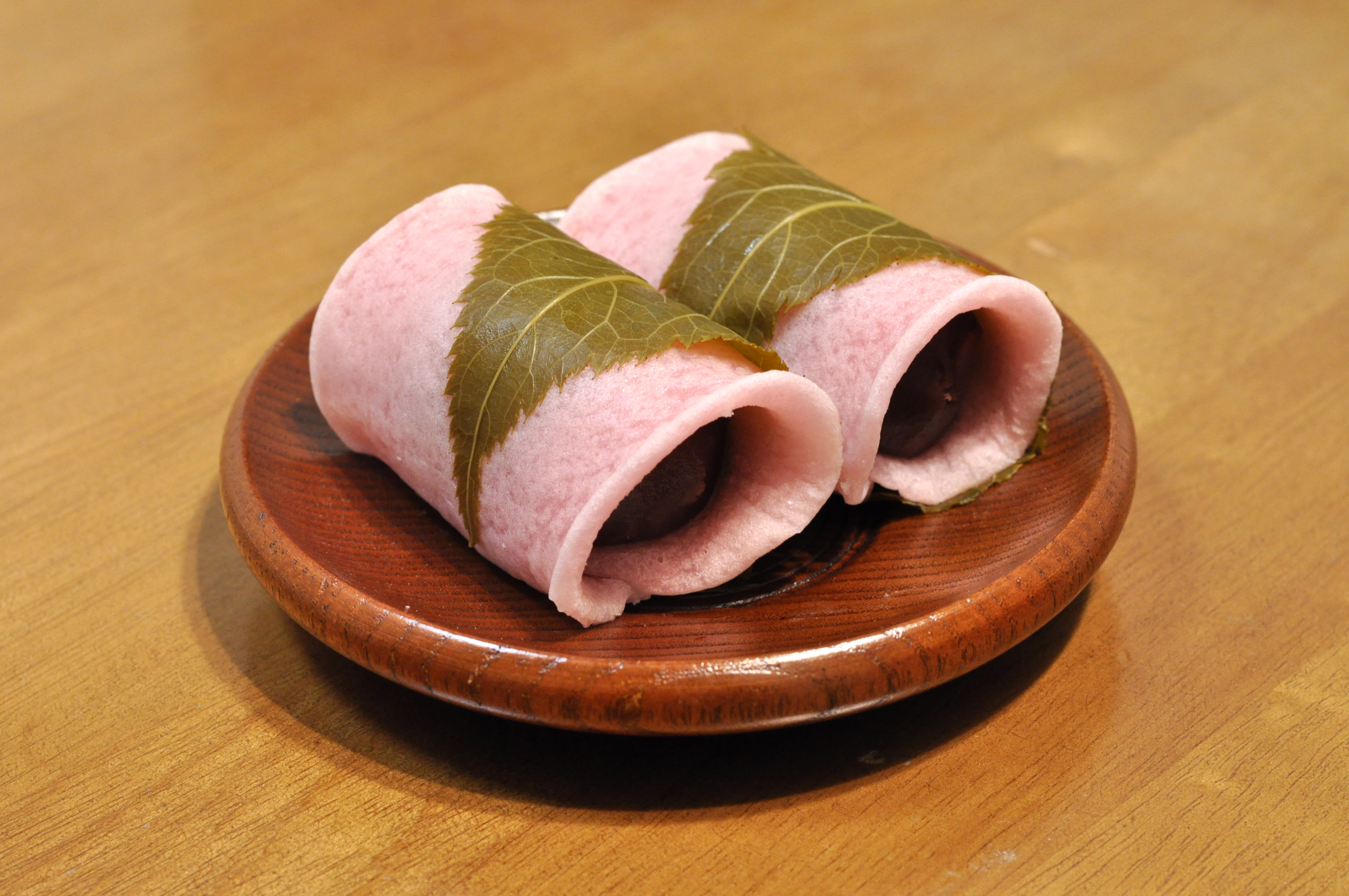
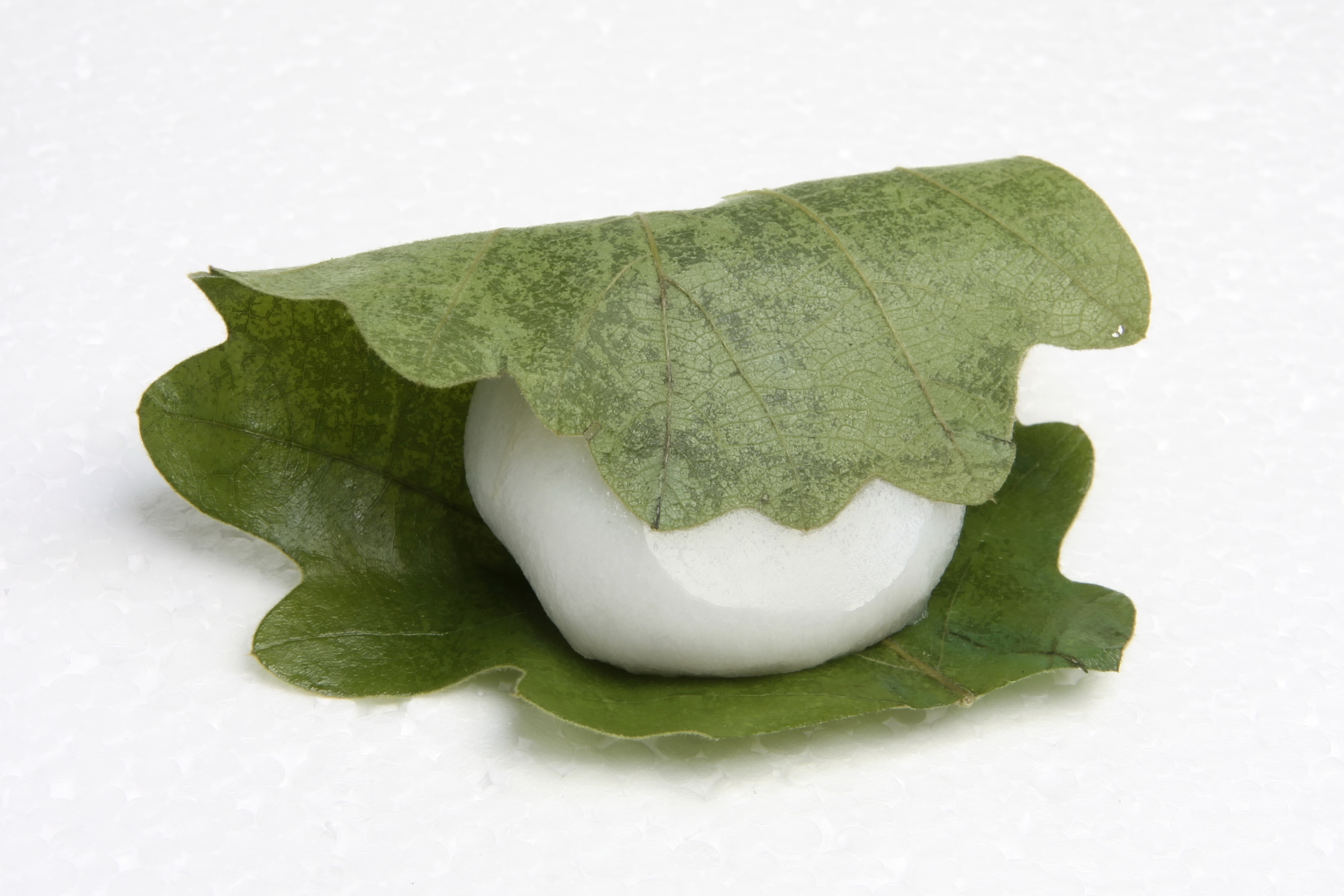
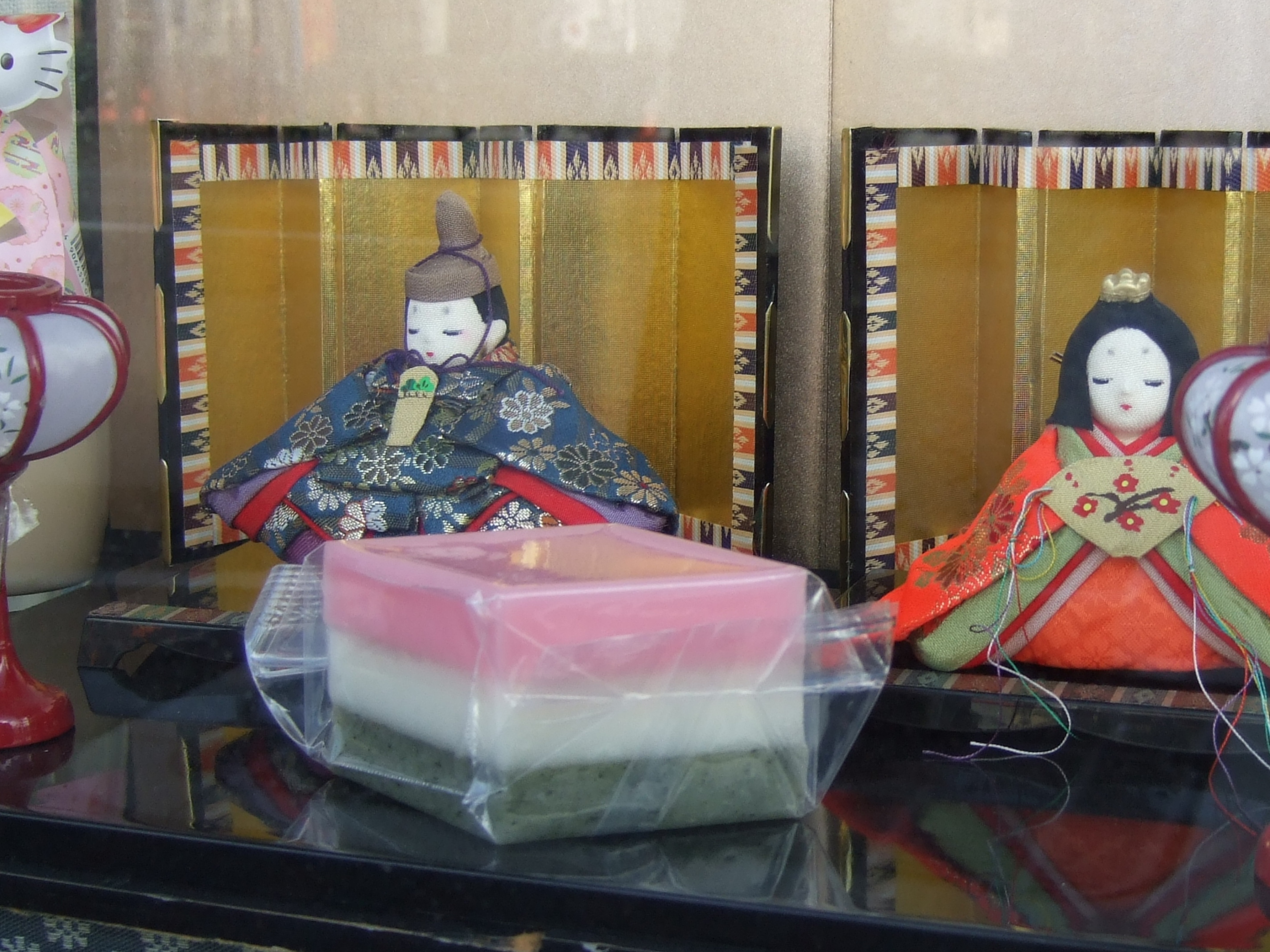
Seasonal specialties. Clockwise from upper left: kagami mochi, sakuramochi wrapped in pickled cherry blossom (sakura) leaf, Girls' Day hishi mochi, kashiwa mochi.

=== New Year ===
- Kagami mochi is a New Year's decoration, which is traditionally broken and eaten in a ritual called kagami biraki (mirror opening) and placed on family altars on December 28.
- Zōni is a soup containing rice cakes. It is also eaten on New Year's Day. In addition to mochi, zōni contains vegetables such as taro, carrot, honeywort, and red and white colored kamaboko.
- Kinako mochi is traditionally made on New Year's Day as an emblem of luck. This style of mochi preparation involves roasting the mochi over a fire or stove, then dipping it into water, and finally coating it with sugar and kinako (soy flour).

=== Spring ===
The cherry blossom (sakura) is a symbol of Japan and signifies the onset of full-fledged spring. Sakuramochi is a pink-colored mochi surrounding sweet red bean paste and wrapped in an edible, salted cherry blossom leaf; this dish is usually made during the spring.

=== Children's Day ===
Children's Day is celebrated in Japan on May 5. On this day, the Japanese promote the happiness and well-being of children. Kashiwa-mochi and chimaki are made especially for this celebration. Kashiwa-mochi is white mochi surrounding a sweet red bean paste filling with a kashiwa oak leaf wrapped around it. Chimaki is a variation of a dango wrapped in bamboo leaves.

=== Girls' Day ===
Hishi mochi is a ceremonial dessert presented as a ritual offering on the days leading up to Hinamatsuri, or "Girls' Day" in Japan, on March 3 every year. Hishi mochi is rhomboid-shaped mochi with layers of red, green, and white. The three layers are colored with jasmine flowers, water caltrop, and mugwort.

== Preparation ==
=== Traditional ===
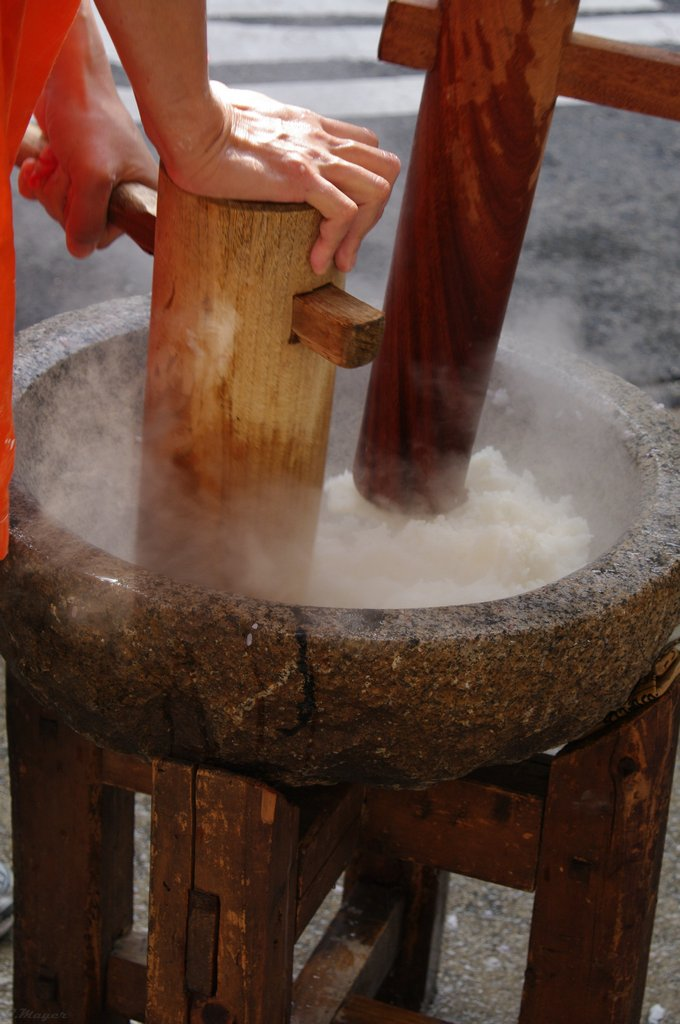
Steamed rice in a stone mortar being mashed with a wooden kine (pestle) during mochitsuki

Traditionally, mochi making is an important cultural event in Japan that involves members of a local community or family. Although less common today, the traditional process still exists in most rural areas, urban temples, shrines, and community spaces, especially in the days leading up to the new year. The traditional process of mochi-pounding (called mochitsuki (餅つき)) involves whole rice as the only ingredient and takes place in three basic steps:

1. Polished glutinous rice is soaked overnight and steamed.
2. The steamed rice is mashed and pounded with wooden mallets (kine) in a traditional mortar (usu). The work involves two people, one pounding and the other turning and wetting the mochi. They must keep a steady rhythm or they may accidentally injure each other with the heavy kine.
3. The sticky mass is cut or formed into shapes, for example spheres.

=== Modern ===
Cooked rice being automatically tumbled in a modern household machine

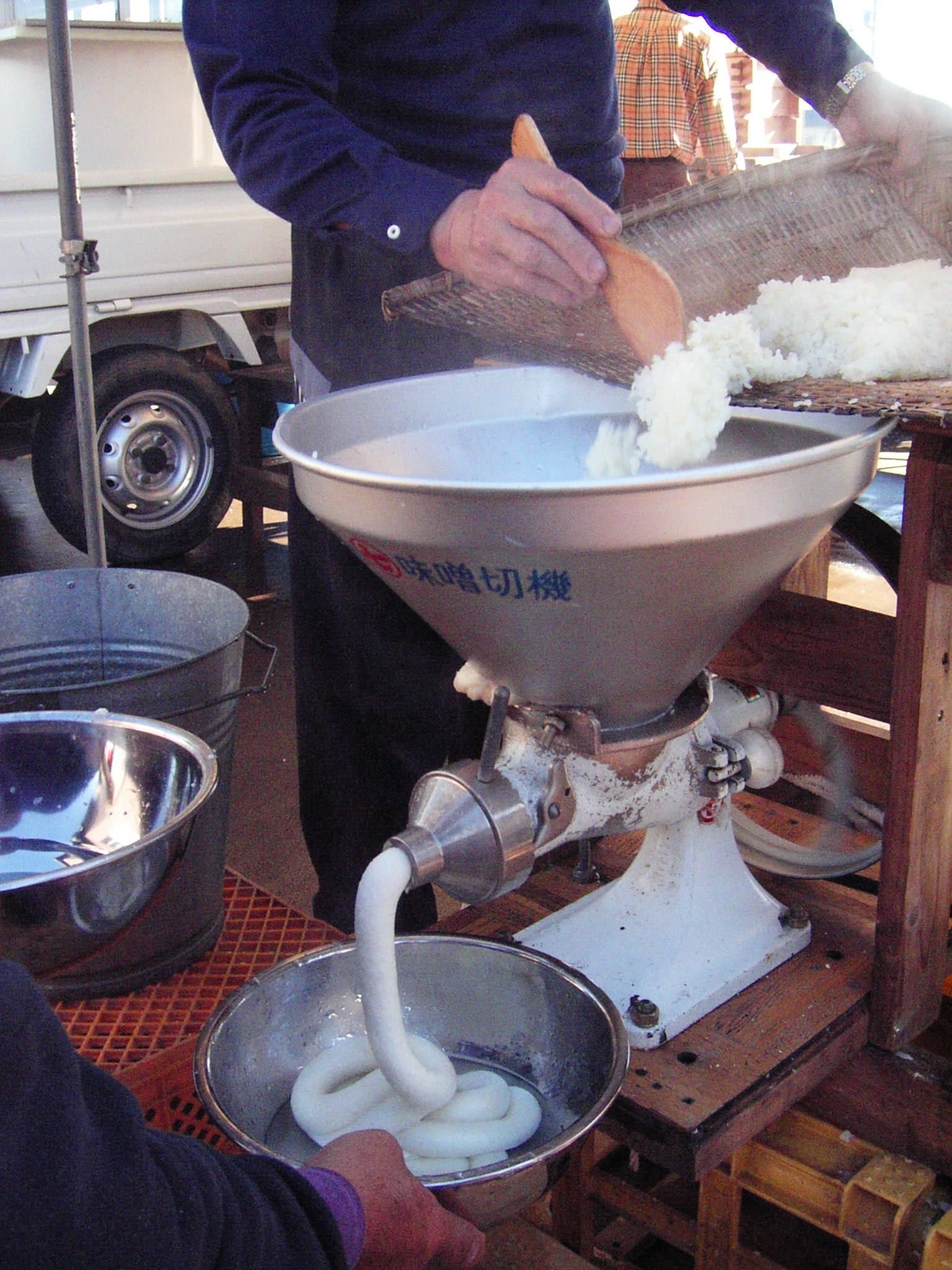
Making mochi with modern equipment

The modern preparation of mochi uses a sweet flour of sweet rice (mochiko). The flour is mixed with water and cooked on a stovetop or in the microwave until it forms a sticky, opaque, white mass. This process is performed twice, stirring the mass in between until it becomes malleable and slightly transparent.

With modern equipment, mochi can be made at home, with the technology automating the laborious dough pounding. Household mochi appliances provide a suitable space where the environment of the dough can be controlled.

The assembly-line sections in mochi production control these aspects:

1. Viscoelasticity or the products' chewiness by selecting specific species of rice
2. Consistency of the dough during automated pounding process
3. Size
4. Flavourings and fillings

Varieties of glutinous and waxy rice are produced as major raw materials for mochi. The rice is chosen for its tensile strength and compressibility. One study found that in kantomochi rice 172 and BC3, amylopectin distribution varied and affected the hardness of mochi. Kantomochi rice produced harder, brittle, grainy textures, all undesirable qualities except for ease of cutting. For mass production, the rice variety should be chewy, but easy to separate.

Generally, two types of machines are used for mochi production in an assembly line. One machine prepares the dough, while the other forms the dough into consistent shapes, unfilled or with filling. The first type of machine controls the temperature at which the rice gelatinizes. One study found that a temperature of 62 °C (144 °F) corresponds to the gelatinization of mochi. When the temperature fell below this point, the hardening was too slow. It was concluded that a processing temperature below 62 °C (144 °F) was unsuitable for dough preparation.

== Processing ==
Mochi is a variation of a low-calorie, low-fat rice cake. The cake has two essential raw materials: rice and water. Sticky rice (also called sweet rice, Oryza sativa var. glutinosa, glutinous sticky rice, glutinous rice, waxy rice, botan rice, biroin chal, mochi rice, pearl rice, and pulut), whether brown or white, is best for mochi-making, as long-grain varieties will not expand correctly. Water is essential in the early stages of preparation. Other additives such as salt and other seasonings and flavorings are important for nutritive value and taste. However, additives can cause breakage of the mass, so they should not be added to the rice before the cake is formed. The balls of rice are then flattened and cut into pieces or shaped into rounds. The machines for mass production are a hugely expensive investment, and the product should have the proper moisture to appeal to consumers.

== Preservation ==
While mochi can be refrigerated for a short storage period, it can also "become hard and not usable." The recommended preservation method is by freezing. The best method for freezing involves wrapping each mochi cake tightly in a sealed plastic bag. Although mochi can be kept in a freezer for almost one year, the frozen mochi may lose flavor and softness or get freezer-burned. Food additives, such as modified tapioca starch, can also extend the shelf life of mochi.

== Ingredients ==
Mochi is relatively simple to make, as only a few ingredients are needed for plain mochi. The main ingredient is either shiratamako or mochiko, Japanese sweet glutinous rice flour. Both shiratamako and mochiko are made from mochigome, a type of glutinous short-grain rice. The difference between shiratamako and mochiko comes from texture and processing methods. Shiratamako flour has been more refined and is a finer flour with a smoother, more elastic feel. Mochiko is less refined and has a doughier texture.

Other ingredients may include water, sugar, and cornstarch (to prevent sticking). Additional other ingredients can be added to create different variations/flavors.

== Nutrition ==
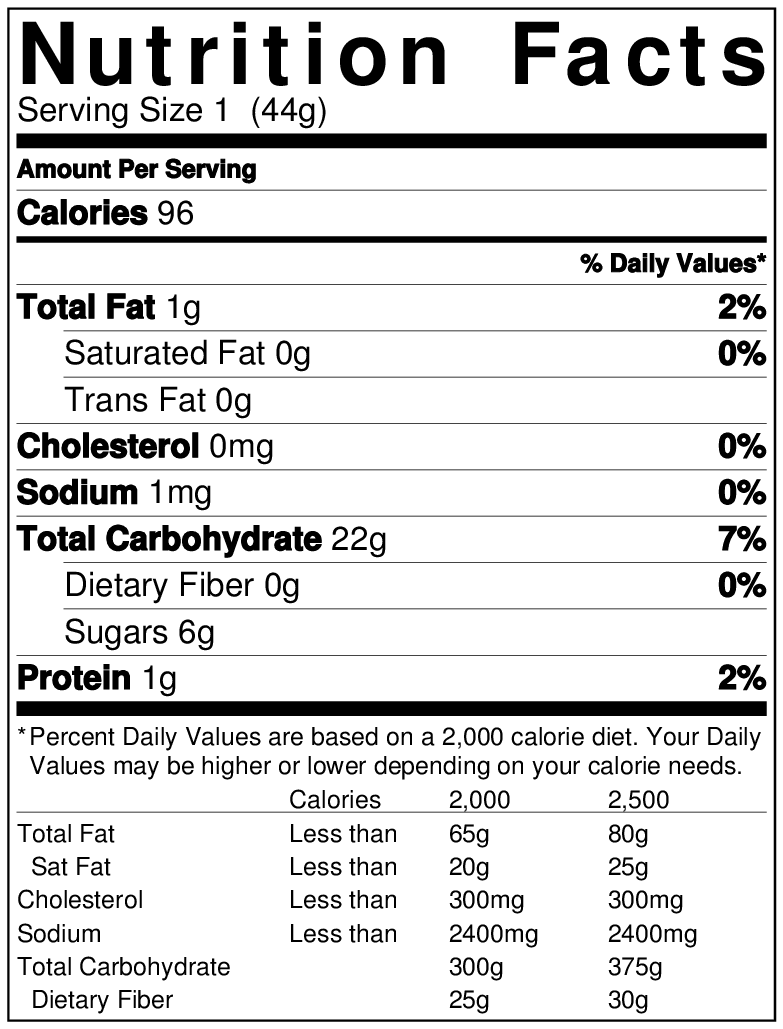
Nutritional facts table for mochi

Mochi is gluten- and cholesterol-free, as it is made from rice flour.

A single serving of 44.0 g (1.55 oz) has 96 calories (kilocalories), 1.0 g (0.035 oz) of fat, but no trans or saturated fat, 1.0 mg (0.015 gr) of sodium, 22.0 g (0.78 oz) of carbohydrates, no dietary fiber, 6.0 g (0.21 oz) of sugar, and 1.0 g (0.035 oz) of protein.

== Viscoelasticity ==
Mochi's characteristic chewiness is due to the polysaccharides in it. The viscosity and elasticity that account for this chewiness are affected by many factors, such as the starch concentration, configuration of the swollen starch granules, the conditions of heating (temperature, heating period and rate of heating), as well as the junction zones that interconnect each polymer chain. The more junction zones the substance has, the stronger the cohesiveness of the gel, thereby forming a more solid-like material. The perfect mochi has the perfect balance between viscosity and elasticity so that it is not inextensible and fragile but rather extensible yet firm.

Many tests have been conducted on the factors that affect the viscoelastic properties of mochi. As puncture tests show, samples with a higher solid (polysaccharide) content show an increased resistance and, thereby, a stronger and tougher gel. This increased resistance to the puncture test indicates that an increase in solute concentration leads to a more rigid and harder gel with an increased cohesiveness, internal binding, elasticity and springiness, which means a decrease in material flow or an increase in viscosity. These results can also be brought about by an increase in heating time.

Sensory assessments of the hardness, stickiness and elasticity of mochi and their relationship with solute concentration and heating time were performed. Similar to the puncture test results, sensory tests determine that hardness and elasticity increase with increasing time of heating and solid concentration. However, the stickiness of the samples increases with increasing time of heating and solid concentration until a certain level, above which the reverse is observed.

These relationships are important because too hard or elastic a mochi is undesirable, as is one that is too sticky and will stick to the walls of the container.

== Health hazards ==
Suffocation deaths are caused by mochi every year in Japan, especially among elderly people. In 2015, it was reported that according to the Tokyo Fire Department – which responds to choking cases – more than 100 people were hospitalized per year for choking on mochi in Tokyo alone. Also, in Tokyo, between 2006 and 2009, there were 18 reported deaths resulting from choking on mochi. As a result of this risk, Japanese authorities put out yearly warnings advising people to cut mochi into small pieces before consumption.

== Popular uses ==
Mochi may be eaten alone as a major component of a main meal and is used as an ingredient in other prepared foods.

=== Confectionery ===
Many types of traditional wagashi and mochigashi (Japanese traditional sweets) are made with mochi. For example, daifuku is a soft round mochi stuffed with sweet filling, such as sweetened red bean paste (anko) or white bean paste (shiro an). Ichigo daifuku is a version containing a whole strawberry inside.

Kusa mochi is a green variety of mochi flavored with mugwort (yomogi). When daifuku is made with kusa mochi, it is called yomogi daifuku.

=== Ice cream ===
Small balls of ice cream are wrapped inside a mochi covering to make mochi ice cream. In Japan, this is manufactured by the conglomerate Lotte under the name Yukimi Daifuku, "snow-viewing daifuku".

=== Soup ===
- Oshiruko or ozenzai is a sweet azuki bean soup with pieces of mochi. In winter, Japanese people often eat it to warm themselves.
- Chikara udon (meaning "power udon") is a dish consisting of udon noodles in soup topped with toasted mochi.
- Zōni see New Year specialties above.

== Other variations ==
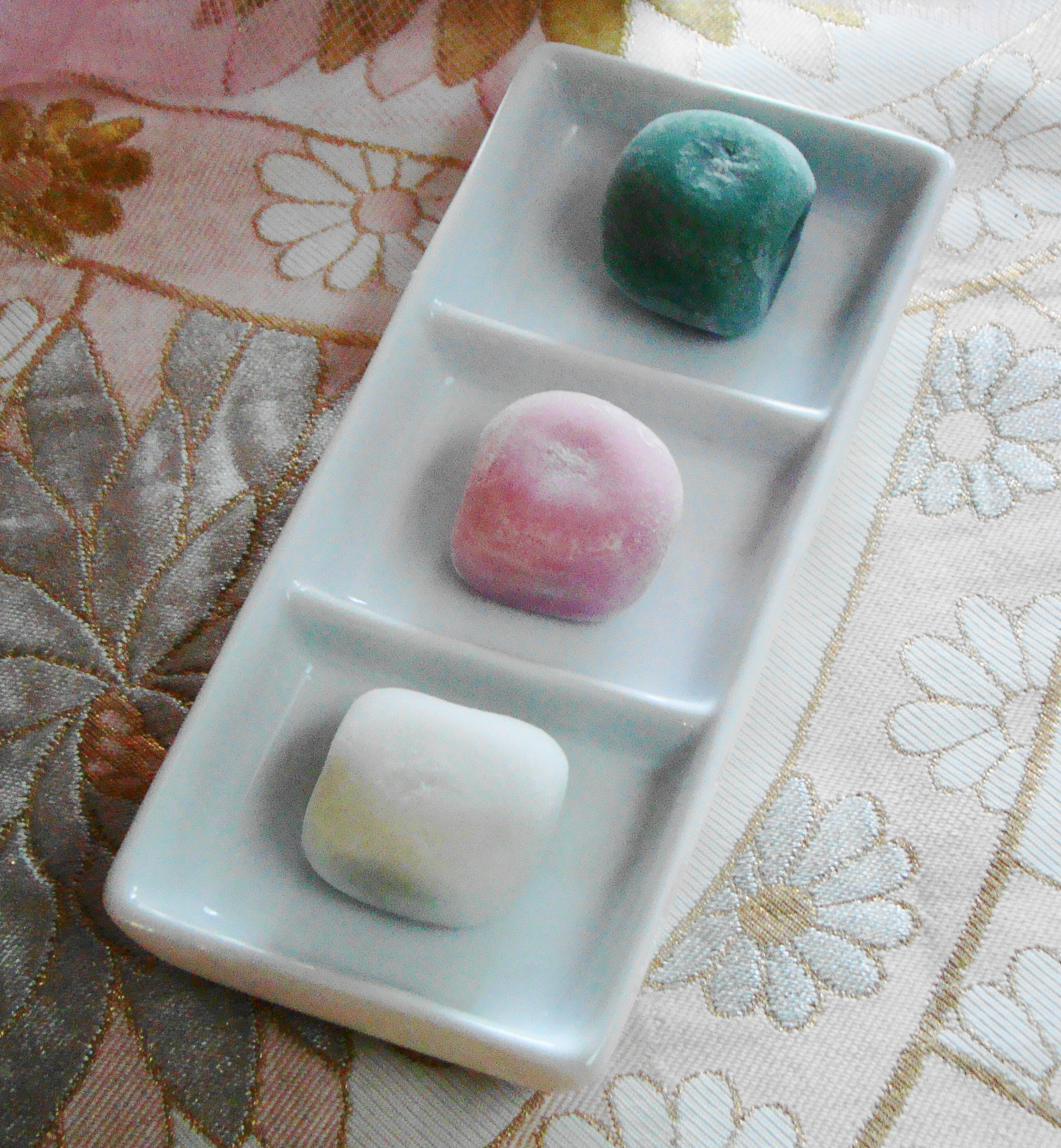
Spherical mochi (dango) can be colored or undyed.

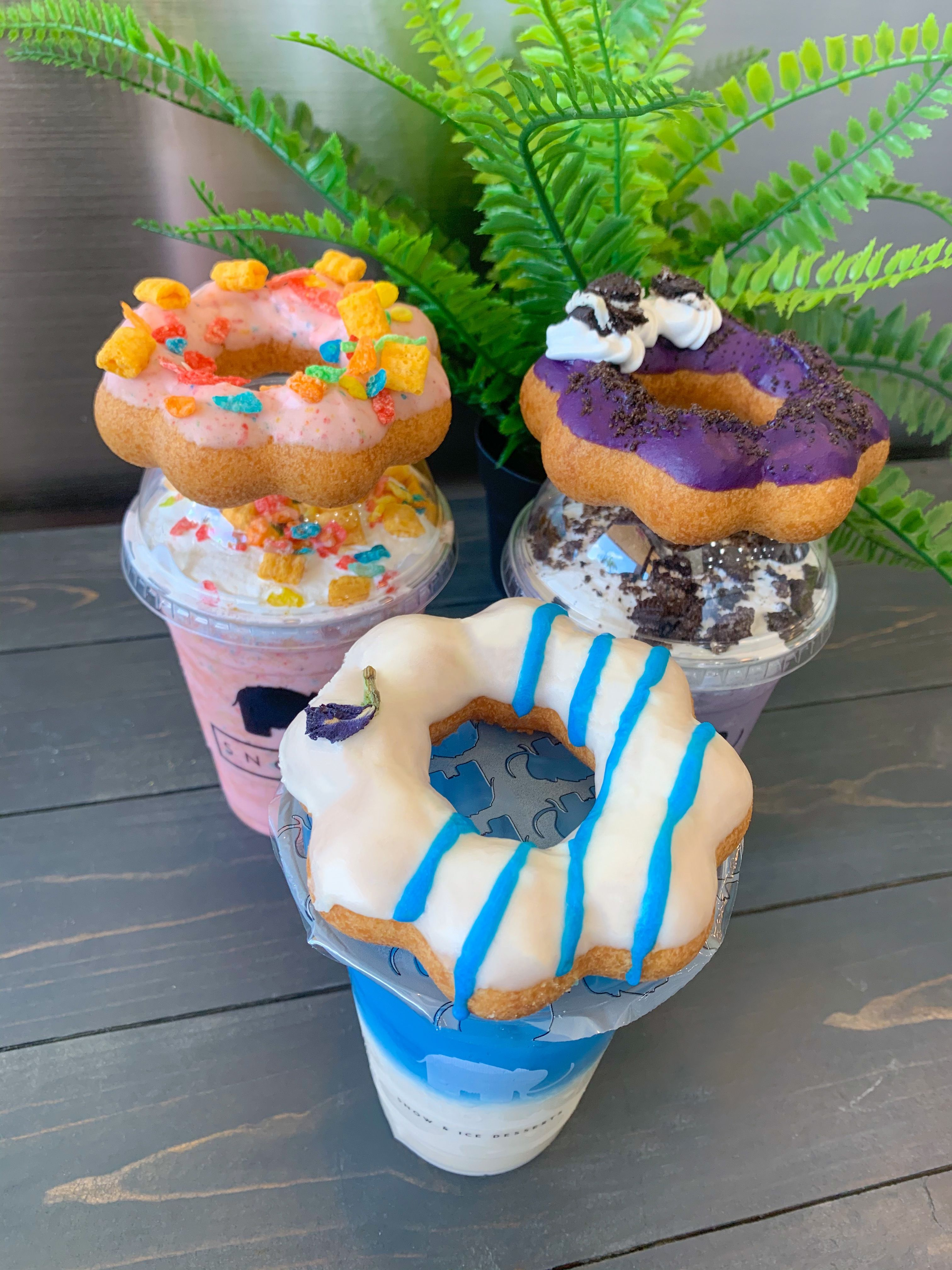
Decorated mochi donuts made in San Diego County

- Dango is a Japanese dumpling made from mochiko (rice flour).
- Warabimochi is not true mochi, but a jelly-like confection traditionally made from bracken starch and covered or dipped in kinako (soybean flour) with sugar. It is popular in the summertime. Kuzumochi is a similar confection made from kudzu starch.
- Manjū (饅頭/まんじゅう) is not a true mochi, but a popular traditional Japanese confection made of flour, rice powder, buckwheat, and red bean paste.
- Sakumochi (索餅) is deep-fried rice cake twisted into a rope shape. It is often consumed during the Japanese Star Festival called tanabata. There is some confusion about its origin based on evidence from historical records of a dish called sakubei (索べい), which some scholars believe was a confection while others think it was an early form of the wheat noodle sōmen. (Sakubei was made from a mixture of wheat flour and rice flour).
- Moffles (waffles made from toasted mochi) were introduced in about 2000. They are made in a specialized machine as well as a traditional waffle iron.
- Mochi donuts are a hybrid confection originally popularized in Japan by the chain Mister Donut before spreading to the United States via Hawaii. This confection is "a cross between a traditional cake-like doughnut and chewy mochi dough similar to what's wrapped around ice cream". The Mister Donut style, also known as "pon de ring", uses tapioca flour and produces mochi donuts that are easy to pull apart. Another variation developed in the United States uses glutinous rice flour which produces a denser mochi donut akin to Hawaiian-style butter mochi. Mochi donuts made from glutinous rice flour "typically contain half the amount of calories as the standard cake or yeast doughnut".

== Similar foods ==
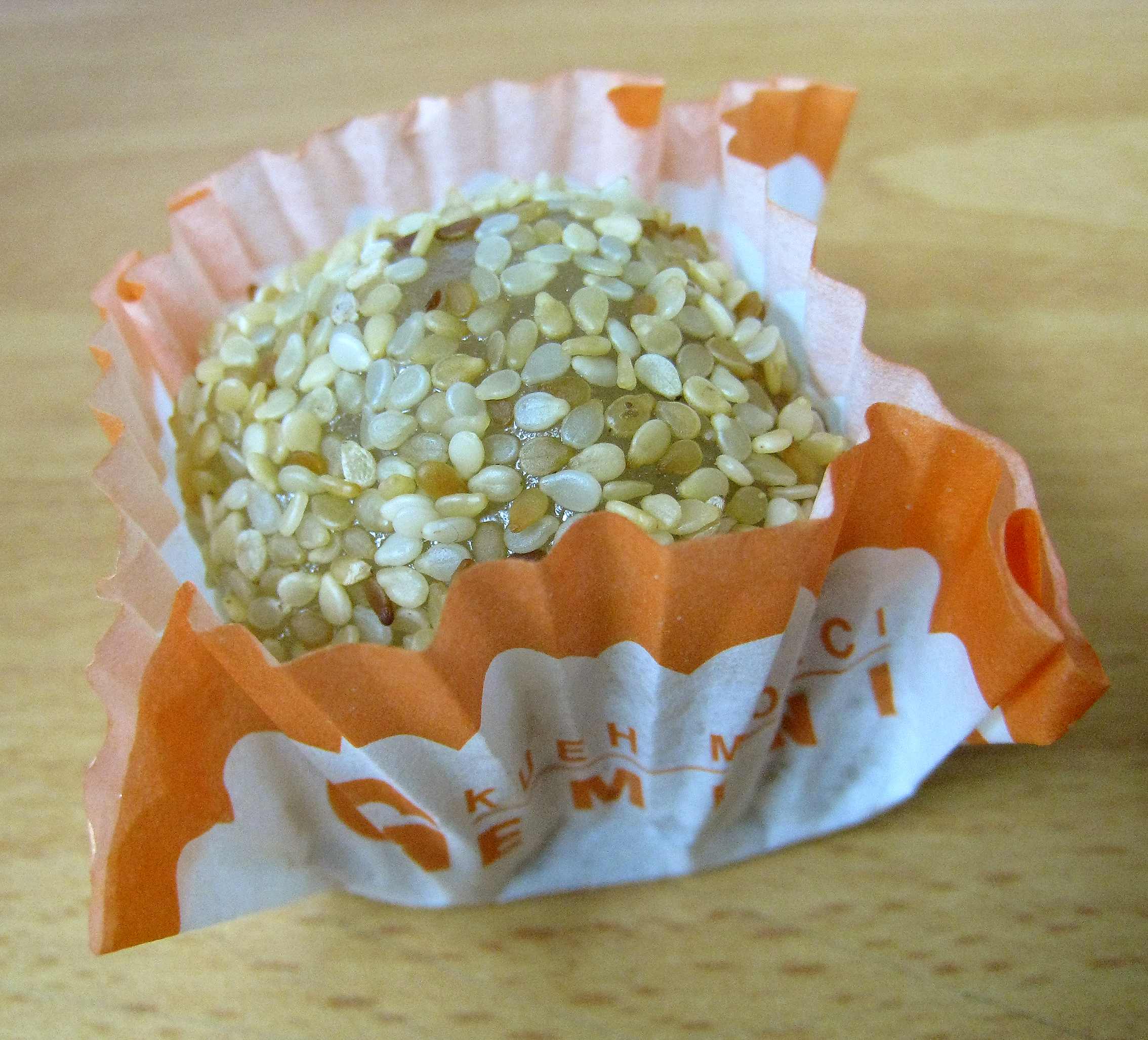
Kue moci in Indonesia; glutinous rice filled with peanut paste and covered with sesame seeds

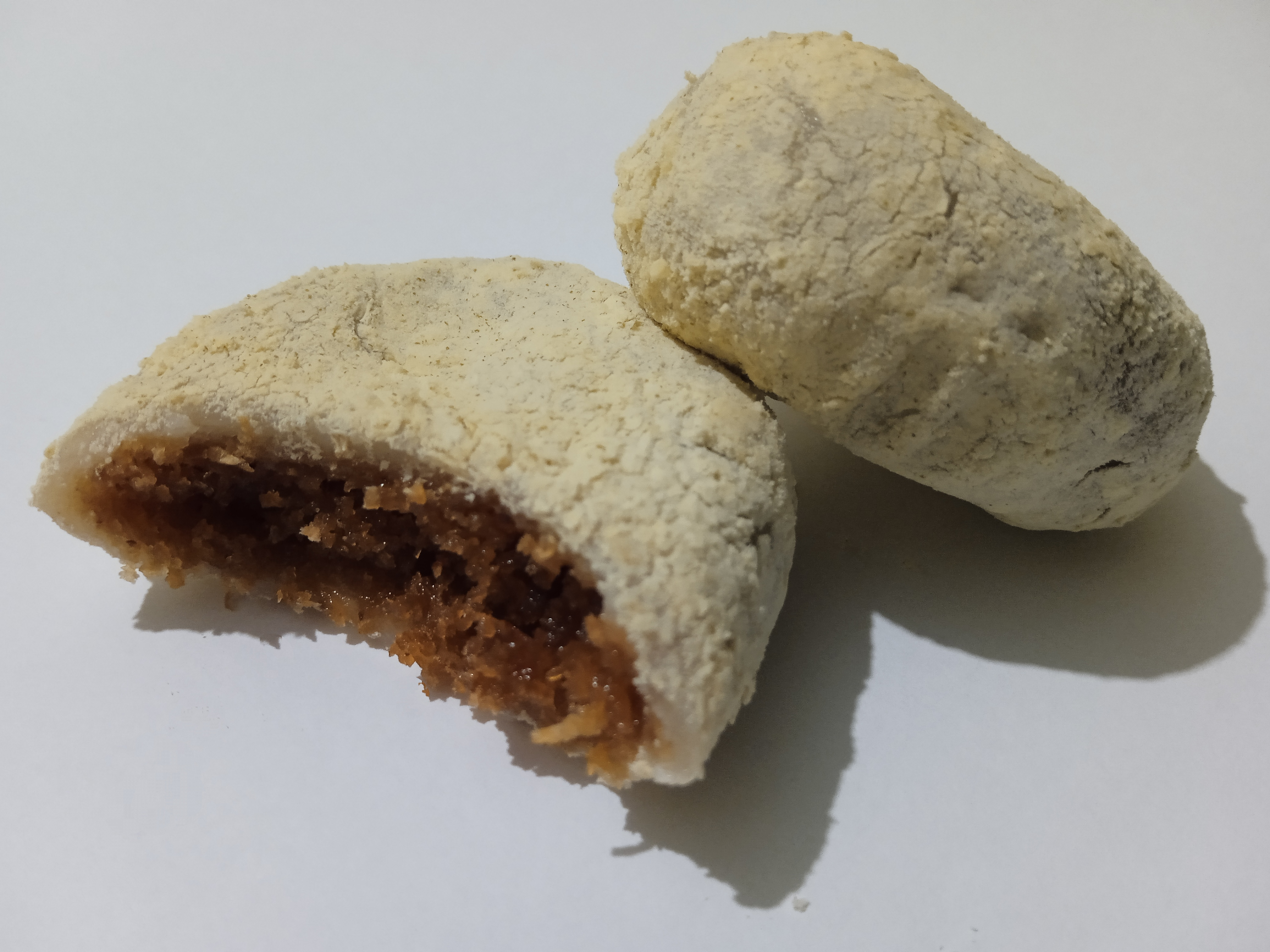
Tepung gomak; another glutinous rice cake filled with shaved coconut filling and coated with mung bean flour

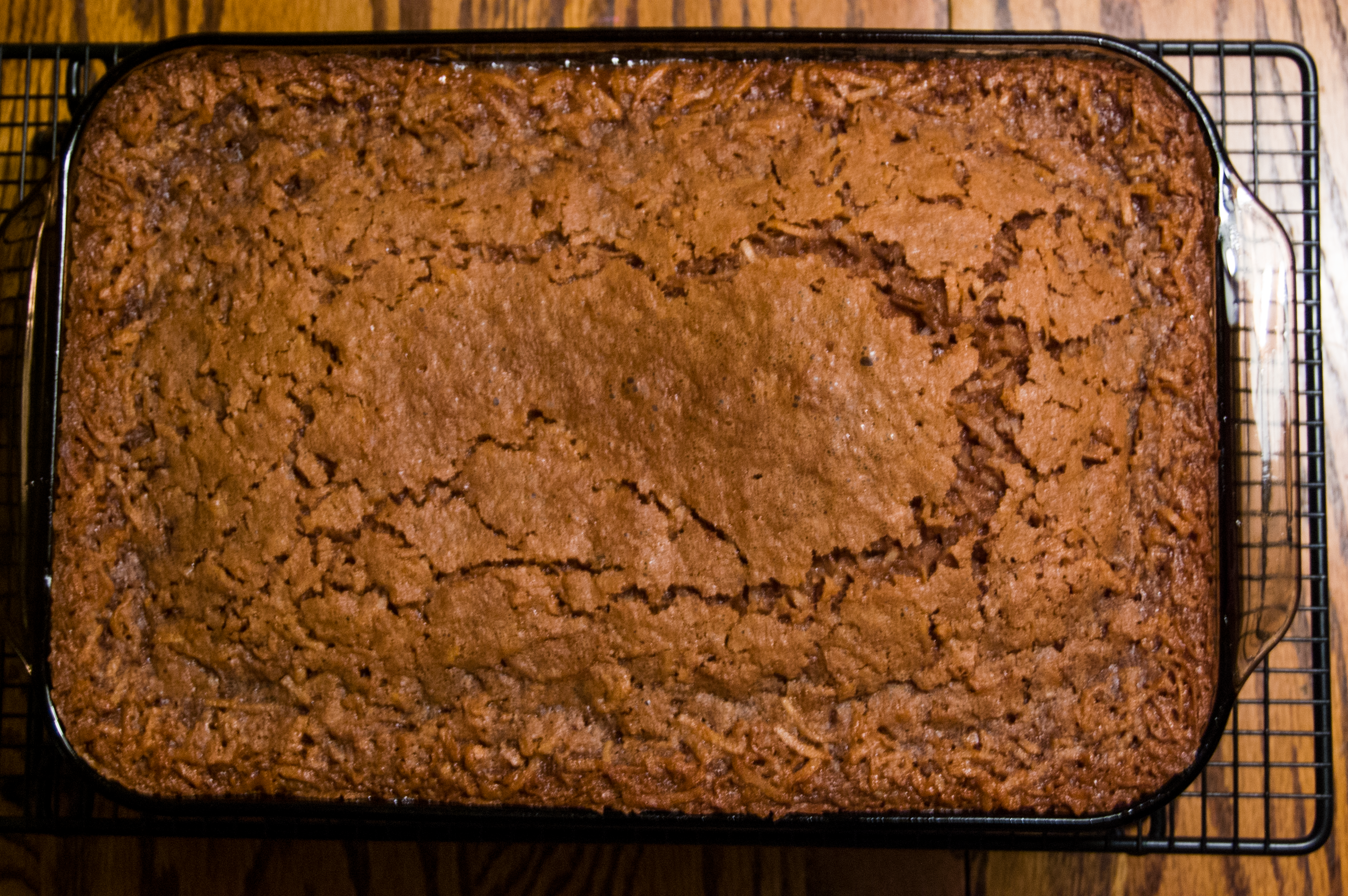
Cocoa butter mochi, based on a Hawaiian recipe

In Taiwan, a traditional Hakka and Hoklo pounded rice cake was called teuchi or tauchi (Chinese: 豆糍; pinyin: dòu cí) and came in various styles and forms just like in Japan. Traditional Hakka mochi is served as glutinous rice dough, covered with peanuts (粢粑; zī bā) or sesame powder. A soft version similar to daifuku, often coming with bean paste fillings, is called moachi (Chinese: 麻糍; Pe̍h-ōe-jī: moâ-chî) in Taiwanese Hokkien and mashu (Chinese: 麻糬; pinyin: máshǔ) in Taiwanese Mandarin.

In China, tangyuan is made from glutinous rice flour mixed with a small amount of water to form balls and is then cooked and served in boiling water. Tangyuan is typically filled with black sesame paste or peanut paste and served in the water that it was boiled in.

In Hong Kong and other Cantonese regions, the traditional lo mai chi (Chinese: 糯米糍; Jyutping: no6 mai5 ci4) is made of glutinous rice flour in the shape of a ball, with fillings such as crushed peanuts, coconut, red bean paste, and black sesame paste. It can come in a variety of modern flavors, such as green tea, mango, taro, strawberry, and more.

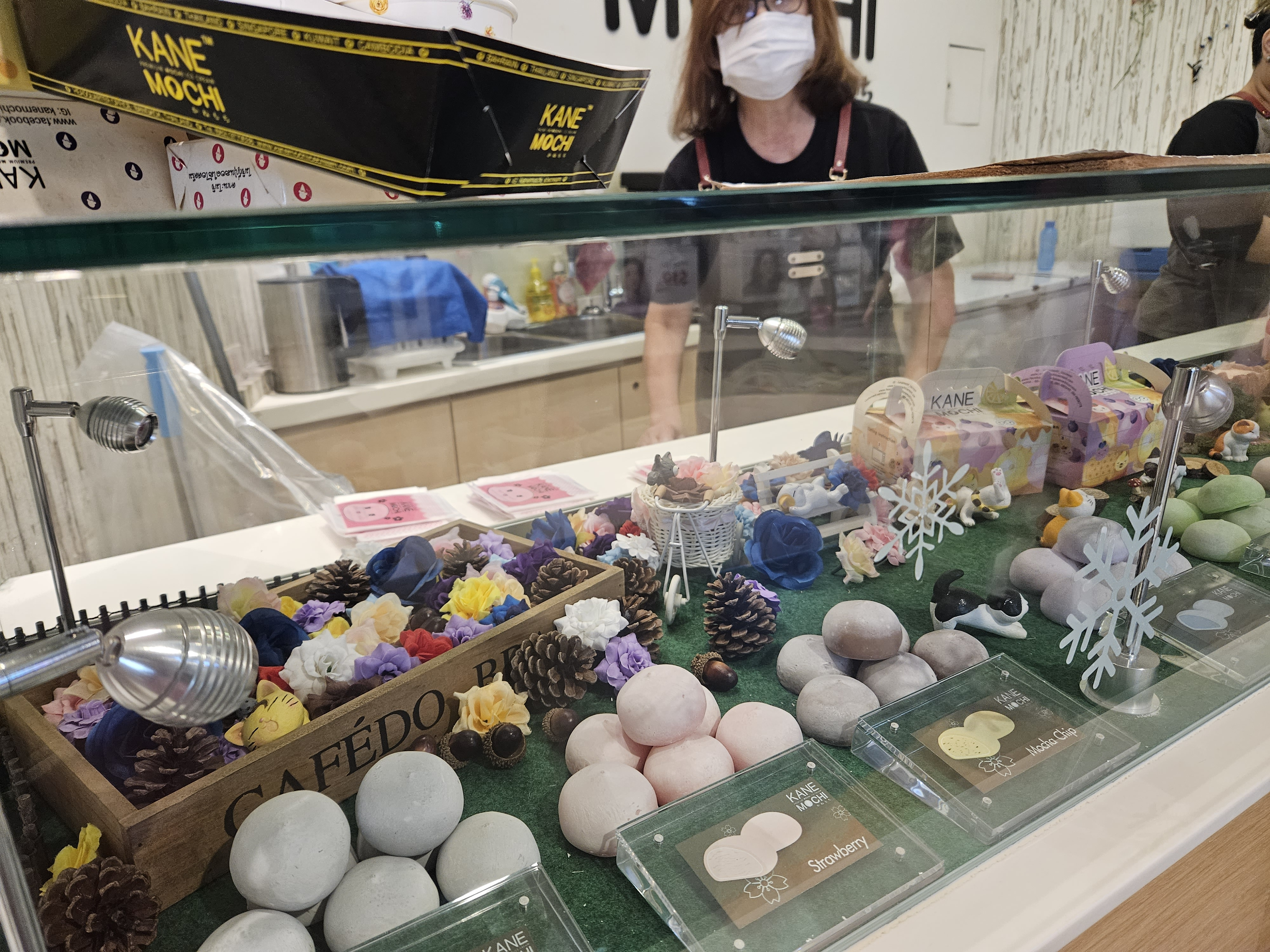
Mochi in Singapore

In Philippines, a traditional Filipino sweet snack similar to Japanese mochi is called tikoy (Chinese: 甜粿; Pe̍h-ōe-jī: tiⁿ-kóe). There is also another delicacy called espasol with a taste similar to Japanese kinako mochi, though made with roasted rice flour (not kinako, roasted soy flour). The Philippines also has several steamed rice snacks with very similar names to mochi, including moche, mache, and masi. These are small steamed rice balls with bean paste or peanut fillings. However, they are not derived from the Japanese mochi but are derivatives of the Chinese jian dui (called buchi in the Philippines). They are also made with the native galapong process, which mixes ground, slightly fermented cooked glutinous rice with coconut milk.

In Korea, chapssal-tteok (Hangul: 찹쌀떡) varieties are made of steamed glutinous rice or steamed glutinous rice flour.

In Indonesia, kue moci is usually filled with sweet bean paste and covered with sesame seeds. Kue moci comes from Sukabumi, West Java and Semarang, Central Java. Another Indonesian mochi is yangko, a Yogyakarta mochi made from glutinuous rice. In Pontianak, mochi is covered with ground peanut powder and the dish named kaloci.

In Malaysia, kuih kochi is made from glutinous rice flour and filled with coconut filling and palm sugar. Another Chinese Malaysian variant, loh mai chi is made with the same ingredients, but their fillings are filled with crushed peanuts. There is also kuih tepung gomak, which has similar ingredients and texture to mochi but the size is larger. The snack is quite popular in the east coast of Malaysia.

In Singapore, muah chee is made from glutinous rice flour and is usually coated with either crushed peanuts or black sesame seeds.

In Hawaii, a dessert variety called "butter mochi" is made with mochiko, butter, sugar, coconut, and other ingredients and then baked to make a sponge cake of sorts.

== See also ==
- Japanese rice
- Arare
- Goheimochi
- Hishi mochi
- Hanabiramochi
- Kuzumochi
- Senbei, rice crackers
- Uirō

Similar foods in other countries, region:

- Lo mai chi
- Bánh giầy
- Chapssal-tteok, Korean glutinous rice cakes
- Jian dui
- Kochi
- Nian gao
- Sapin sapin
- Tteok
- Mūchī
