= Muchi =

Type of soft confectionery made of pounded glutinous rice

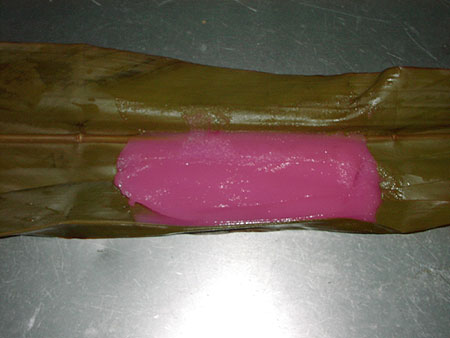
Muchi wrapped in a shell ginger leaf

Mūchī or muchi (Okinawan: ムーチー/餅), also known as Unimūchī (Okinawan: 鬼餅, Japanese: Onimochi), is a type of soft confectionery made of pounded glutinous rice and eaten in Okinawa Prefecture. Mūchī means "rice cake" in the Okinawan language, sometimes called kāsā-mūchī from the fact that it is wrapped in the leaves of shell ginger. After the mūchī is seasoned with brown sugar, white sugar, purple yam and so on, it is wrapped and steamed.

In December, it is eaten as a lucky charm for the prayer of health and longevity. Also, from the end of January to early February of the Gregorian calendar is the coldest season in Okinawa, and it is called mūchī-bīsa over this period in Okinawan. “Families will prepare mūchī together, making dozens of individual ones called kāsā-mūchī, and may even make a huge one, called chikara-mūchī, and eat the big one together. The mūchī treats are tied up in string and hung from the ceiling as pretty decorations in the house."

The origin of the Unimūchī is from a folktale of the main island of Okinawa. It was written about 800 years ago in the Kyūyō, which was compiled in the 18th century at the time of Shō Kei reign. It states that a man who moved from Shuri city to Osato city was attacking humans and animals and became a demon known as an uni. His younger sister was sorrowful and put iron nails in mūchī, which the man loved and fed. Then, she pushed away the brother, who was weakened, to the sea and killed him. From this Okinawan tale, it is also called unimūchī because mūchī was used to exterminate the uni.

== See also ==
- Rice cake
- Mochi
