= Lo mai chi =

Glutinous rice pastry with coconut powder and mungo cream

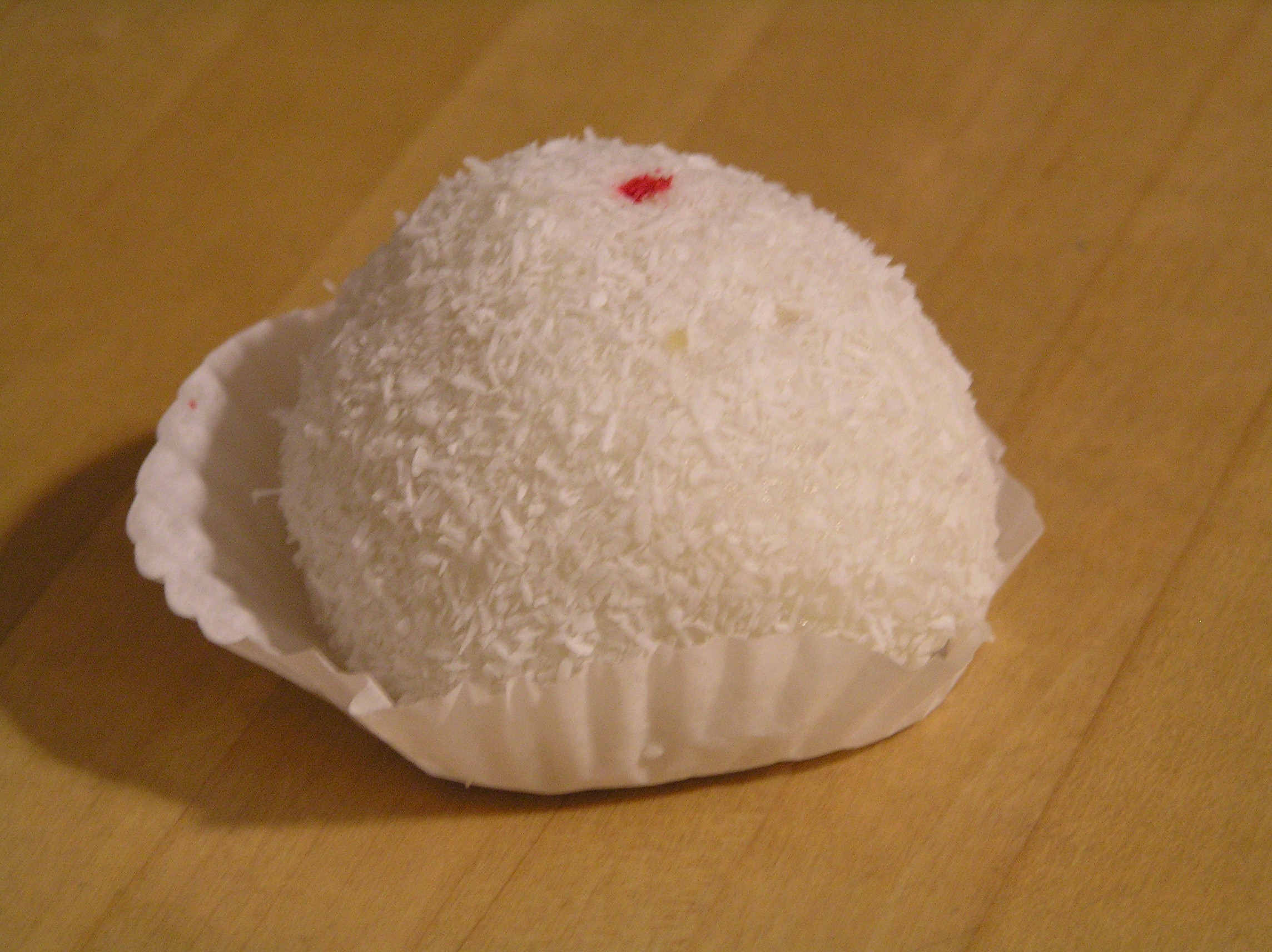
- Alternative names: Glutinous rice dumpling
- Type: Pastry
- Place of origin: China
- Region or state: Foshan, Guangdong
- Main ingredients: Glutinous rice, dried coconut, sugar

Lo mai chi

Chinese name
- Chinese: 糯米糍
- Jyutping: no⁶ mai⁵ ci⁴
- Hanyu Pinyin: nuòmǐcí
- Literal meaning: glutinous rice "food made of rice"
Transcriptions
Standard Mandarin
- Hanyu Pinyin: nuòmǐcí
- Bopomofo: ㄋㄨㄛˋ ㄇㄧˇ ㄘˊ
- Wade–Giles: No^{4}-mi^{3}-tz'u^{2}
Yue: Cantonese
- Yale Romanization: noh máih chìh
- Jyutping: no⁶ mai⁵ ci⁴
- IPA: [nɔ̀ː mɐ̬i tsʰȉː]

Vietnamese name
- Vietnamese: bánh bao chỉ

Lo mai chi (Chinese: 糯米糍), known in Mandarin as nuomici, is a type of Chinese pastry. It is one of the most standard pastries in Hong Kong. It can also be found in most Chinatown bakery shops overseas. It is also referred to as glutinous rice dumpling. Today there are many different modern variations such as green tea flavor, mango flavor, etc.

The glutinous rice ball can be dusted with dried coconut on the outside. The outer layer is made of a rice flour dough and the inside is typically filled with a sweet filling. The most common fillings are sugar with coconut and crumbled peanuts, red bean paste, and black sesame seed paste.

== See also ==
- Daifuku
- Mochi
- Ela Ada
