= Japanese destroyer Hishi =

Two Japanese destroyers have been named Hishi:

- Japanese destroyer Hishi (1921), a Momi-class destroyer launched in 1921 and sunk in 1942
- Japanese destroyer Hishi, a Tachibana-class destroyer scrapped incomplete on slip in 1945
