= Hishi mochi =

Diamond shaped mochi that consists of three layers

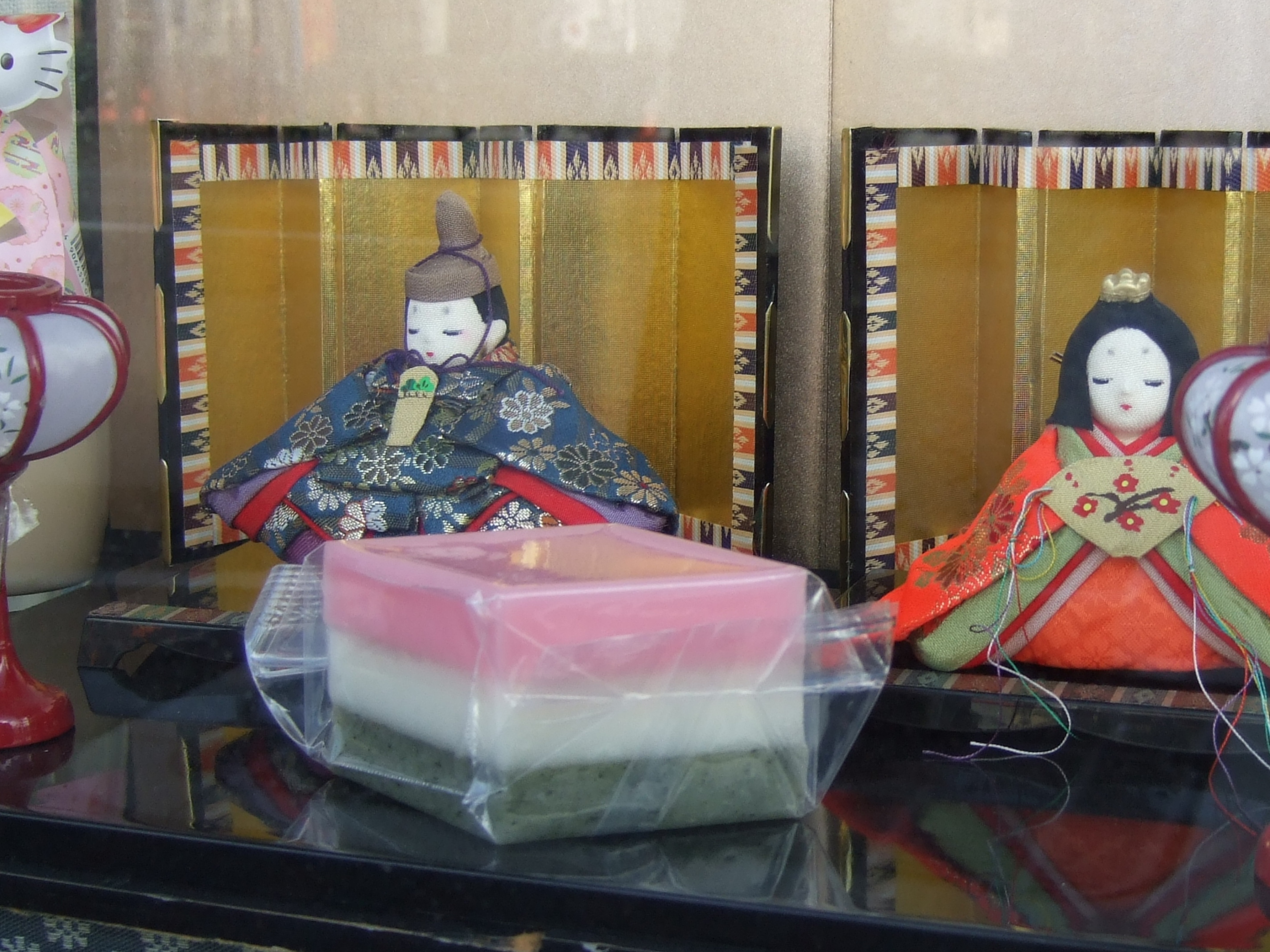
- Type: Wagashi
- Place of origin: Japan
- Main ingredients: Mochi, fruit of Gardenia jasminoides, water caltrop, Gnaphalium affine

Hishi mochi (菱餅 / ひしもち) is a symbolic Japanese sweet associated with the Hinamatsuri "Girl's Day" festival, which coincides with the calendar date for Xiuxi (上巳). The sweet is diamond shaped and typically formed from three layers of red (pink), white, and green mochi, from top to bottom. Depending on region, red may be substituted for yellow, or the sweet may have 5 or 7 layers instead. It is usually presented with hina dolls.

The shape is believed to have originated in the Edo period, and to be a representation of fertility.

== Colors ==
The red of the mochi are derived from fruits of Gardenia jasminoides (山梔子), and is symbolic of peach flowers. The white is made from the water caltrop (菱, hishi), and represents the snow and its cleansing effects. Finally, the green is from Gnaphalium affine (ハハコグサ) or mugwort like kusa mochi, and is believed to be a restorative that improves the blood.
