= Ireland at the 1964 Summer Olympics =

- IOC code: IRL
- NOC: Olympic Federation of Ireland
- Website: olympics.ie

in Tokyo
- Competitors: 25 in 7 sports
- Flag bearer: John Lawlor
- Medals Ranked 35th: Gold 0 Silver 0 Bronze 1 Total 1

Summer Olympics appearances (overview)
- 1924; 1928; 1932; 1936; 1948; 1952; 1956; 1960; 1964; 1968; 1972; 1976; 1980; 1984; 1988; 1992; 1996; 2000; 2004; 2008; 2012; 2016; 2020; 2024

Other related appearances
- Great Britain (1896–1920)

Ireland competed at the 1964 Summer Olympics in Tokyo, Japan. 25 competitors, 24 men and 1 woman, took part in 23 events in 7 sports.

== Medalists ==
Medal	Name	Sport	Event
Bronze	Jim McCourt	Boxing	Men's Lightweight

== Athletics ==
Athlete	Event	Heat		Semifinal		Final	
Athlete	Event	Time	Rank	Time	Rank	Time	Rank
Derek McCleane	Men's 800m	1:49.9	3	1:48.4	7	Did Not Advance	
Noel Carroll	Men's 800m	1:51.1	5	Did Not Advance			
Basil Clifford	Men's 1500m	3:54.9	8	Did Not Advance			
Thomas O'Riordan	Men's 5000m	14:08.8	9	–		Did Not Advance	
Jim Hogan	Men's 10,000m	–				DNF	
Jim Hogan	Men's Marathon	–				DNF	
Maeve Kyle	Women's 400m	55.4	4	55.3	7	Did Not Advance	
Maeve Kyle	Women's 800m	2:11.3	5	2:12.9	8	Did Not Advance	

Athlete	Event	Qualification		Final	
Athlete	Event	Mark	Rank	Mark	Rank
John Lawlor	Men's Hammer Throw	59.12	23	Did Not Advance	

== Boxing ==
Athlete	Event	Round of 32	Round of 16	Quarterfinals	Semifinals	Final	Rank
Athlete	Event	Opposition Result	Opposition Result	Opposition Result	Opposition Result	Opposition Result	Rank
Sean McCafferty	Flyweight	Carbonell (CUB) W 5–0	Shittu (GHA) W 5–0	Atzori (ITA) L 5–0	Did Not Advance		
Christopher Rafter	Bantamweight	Almarez (ARG) L 5–0	Did Not Advance				
Pat Fitzsimmons	Featherweight	Gutman (POL) L 5–0	Did Not Advance				
James McCourt	Lightweight	Suh (KOR) W 4–1	Sarwar (PAK) W 4–1	Barrera (ESP) W 4–1	Barannikov (URS) L 3–2	Did Not Advance	3rd place, bronze medalist(s)
Brian Anderson	Light Welterweight	Touch (CAM) L 3–2	Did Not Advance				

== Equestrian ==
=== Individual Eventing ===
- Anthony Cameron on Black Salmon 5th
- Thomas Brennan on Kilkenny 16th
- John Harty on San Michele 18th
- Harry Freeman on St. Finbarr 28th

=== Team Eventing ===
Rider	Horse	Rank
Anthony Cameron	Black Salmon	4th
Thomas Brennan	Kilkenny	4th
John Harty	San Michele	4th

== Fencing ==
Two fencers, both men, represented Ireland in 1964.

Men's foil

- Michael Ryan Eliminated in Round 2
- John Bouchier-Hayes Eliminated after Round 1

Men's épée

- Michael Ryan Eliminated after Round 1
- John Bouchier-Hayes Eliminated in Round 2

Men's sabre

- Michael Ryan Eliminated after Round 1
- John Bouchier-Hayes Eliminated after Round 1

== Judo ==
John Ryan – Men's Open Category

Pool B

Place	Judoka	Score	Qual.
1	Theodore Boronovskis (AUS)	2–0	QQ
2	John Ryan (IRL)	1–1	QR
3	Ali Hachicha (TUN)	0–2	

Repechage Pool

Place	Judoka	Score	Qual.
1	Akio Kaminaga (JPN)	2–0	QQ
2	John Ryan (IRL)	1–1	
3	Thomas Ong (PHI)	0–2	

== Sailing ==
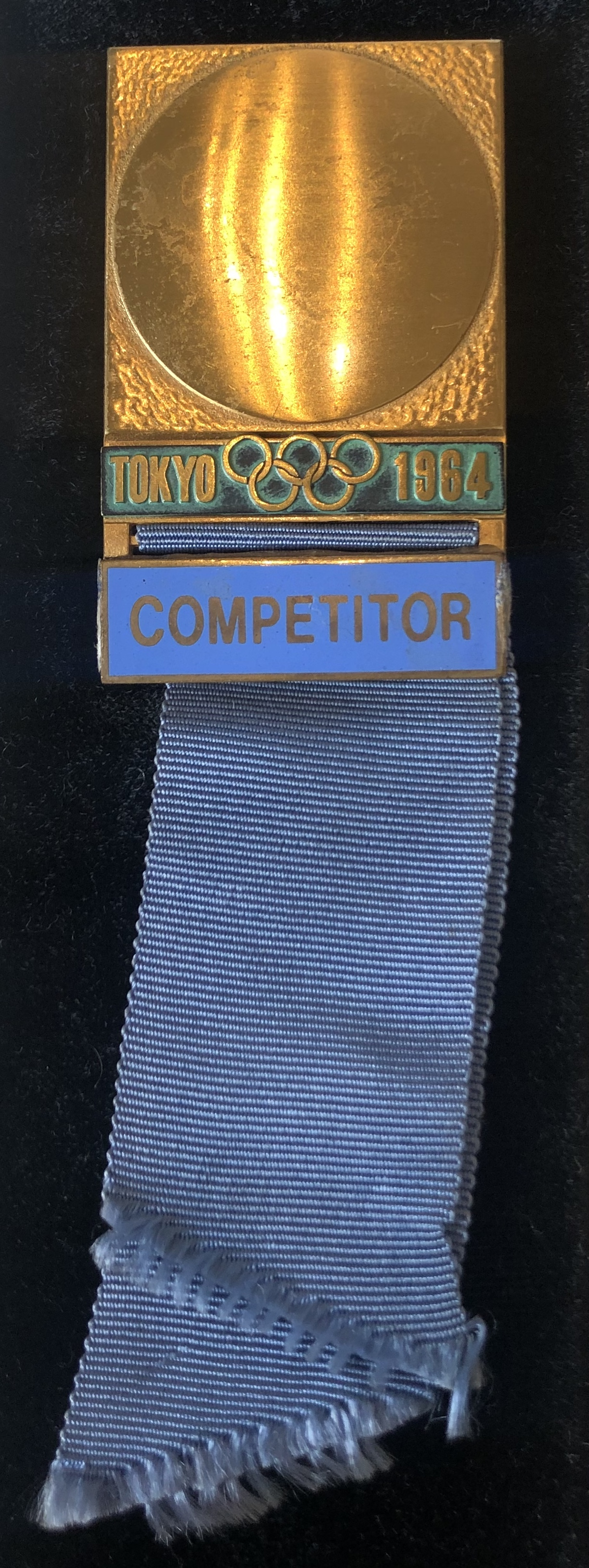
1964 Summer Olympic Games competitor medal awarded to Irish yachtsman Eddie Kelliher

- Johnny Hooper – Finn 23rd
- Eddie Kelliher, Rob D'Alton & Harry Maguire – Dragon 20th

== Wrestling ==
Name	Event	Round 1	Round 2	Round 3	Round 4	Round 5	Final Round	Rank
Joe Feeney	Men's freestyle welterweight	De Vescovi (ITA) L Decision	Boyle (AUS) W Decision	Mönkhbat (MGL) W Decision	Did Not Advance			11
Sean O'Connor	Men's freestyle flyweight	Yanılmaz (TUR) L Fall	Khakshar (AFG) W Fall	Grassi (ITA) L Decision	Did Not Advance			=14
