= Jaroslav Polák =

Czech judoka

Personal information
- Born: 4 December 1937; Czechoslovakia
- Died: 11 July 2025 (aged 87)

Sport
- Country: Czechoslovakia; Czech Republic
- Sport: Judo
- Coached by: Vladimír Lorenz; René Srdínko; Jiří Synek; Oldřich Vlasák; Václav Bříza

Jaroslav Polák (4 December 1937 – 11 July 2025) was a Czech judoka.

== Life and career ==
Polák was born in Czechoslovakia. He attended the Higher Vocational School and Secondary Industrial School in Jičín.

At the age of eighteen, Polák competed at the 1955 European Judo Championships, placing 5th place in the 1st dan event. Over the years, he competed at the 1957, 1959, 1960, 1961, 1962 and 1964 European Judo Championships. He retired his judo career in 1966. After retiring, he worked as a referee.

Polák was inducted into the Hradec Králové Sports Hall of Fame in 2018.

== Death ==
Polák died on 11 July 2025, at the age of 87.
