= 1957 European Judo Championships =

1957 Judo European Judo Championships
- Location: Rotterdam, Netherlands
- Date: 10 November 1957

Competition at external databases
- Links: JudoInside

The 1957 European Judo Championships were the 6th edition of the European Judo Championships, and were held in Rotterdam, Netherlands on 10 November 1957.

== Medal winners ==
Event	Gold	Silver	Bronze
1st dan	(United Kingdom) John Newman	(France) Marcel Nottola	(Czechoslovakia) Leopold Pisin (Netherlands) Jo Dirks
2nd dan	(West Germany) Franz Sinek	(United Kingdom) Alan Petherbridge	(Netherlands) Cor De Waal (Belgium) Jean Begaux
3rd dan	(Belgium) Daniel Outelet	(West Germany) Walter Reiter	(France) Robert Dazzi (Netherlands) Tonny Wagenaar
4th dan	(Netherlands) Anton Geesink	(France) Henri Courtine	(France) Robert Picard
U68	(Netherlands) Koos Bonte	(France) Guy Lample	(Belgium) Désiré Durieux (Netherlands) Jan De Waal
U80	(France) Pierre Rigal	(Netherlands) Hein Essink	(France) Michel Francesch (West Germany) Werner Steinbeck
O80	(Italy) Nicola Tempesta	(France) Etienne Nemer	(Netherlands) Jo Dirks (Czechoslovakia) Jiri Masin
open class	(Netherlands) Anton Geesink	(France) Bernard Pariset	(United Kingdom) Charles Palmer (West Germany) Gerhard Alpers
