= 1958 European Judo Championships =

1958 Judo European Judo Championships
- Location: Barcelona, Spain
- Dates: 10–11 May 1958

Competition at external databases
- Links: JudoInside

The 1958 European Judo Championships were the 7th edition of the European Judo Championships, and were held in Barcelona, Spain from 10 to 11 May 1958.

== Medal winners ==
Event	Gold	Silver	Bronze
1st dan	(France) Michel Bourgoinn	(France) Marcel Nottola	(Netherlands) Jan van Ierland (Netherlands) Jo Dirks
2nd dan	(United Kingdom) John Newman	(West Germany) Franz Sinek	(United Kingdom) Alan Petherbridge (Spain) Enrique Aparicio
3rd dan	(France) Robert Dazzi	(United Kingdom) Douglas Young	(Belgium) Daniel Outelet (France) Roland Burger
4th dan	(Netherlands) Anton Geesink	(France) Bernard Pariset	(France) Robert Picard (United Kingdom) Denis Bloss
U63	(Netherlands) Jan De Waal		
U68		(France) Jacques Pujol	(France) Guy Lample (West Germany) Johann Goor
U80	(Austria) Walter Gauhs	(France) Marcel Nottola	(Netherlands) Tonny Wagenaar
O80	(France) Henri Courtine	(France) Robert Dazzi	(Spain) Enrique Aparicio (Spain) Eizaguirre Gómez
open class	(Netherlands) Anton Geesink	(France) Bernard Pariset	(Netherlands) Jan van Ierland (Spain) José Pons
