= 1959 European Judo Championships =

1959 Judo European Judo Championships
- Location: Vienna, Austria
- Date: 9 May 1959

Competition at external databases
- Links: JudoInside

The 1959 European Judo Championships were the 9th edition of the European Judo Championships, and were held in Vienna, Austria on 9 May 1959.

== Medal winners ==
Event	Gold	Silver	Bronze
1st dan	(France) Lionel Grossain	(France) Jacques le Berré	(West Germany) Manfred Mühl (Italy) Romano Polverari
2nd dan	(France) Marcel Nottola	(West Germany) Franz Sinek	(Belgium) Pierre Brouha (West Germany) Gerhard Alpers
3rd dan	(France) Michel Rabut	(France) Gilbert Legay	(Belgium) Theo Guldemont (Austria) Paul Kunisch
4th dan	(France) Henri Courtine	(France) Claude Collard	(Belgium) Daniel Outelet
U63	(Netherlands) Koos Bonte		
U68	(Socialist Federal Republic of Yugoslavia) Mladen Masztela	(West Germany) Matthias Schiessleder	(West Germany) Erich Zielke
U70	(Netherlands) Hein Essink		
U80		(Austria) Paul Kunisch	(Socialist Federal Republic of Yugoslavia) Dimitar Sijan (West Germany) Alfred Träder
O80	(Netherlands) Anton Geesink	(West Germany) Franz Sinek	(Spain) Enrique Aparicio (Czechoslovakia) Josef Novotny
open class	(Netherlands) Anton Geesink	(Italy) Nicola Tempesta	(France) Bernard Pariset (France) Jean-Pierre Dessailly
