= Judo at the 1964 Summer Olympics – Men's open category =

Judo competition

Men's open category at the Games of the XVIII Olympiad
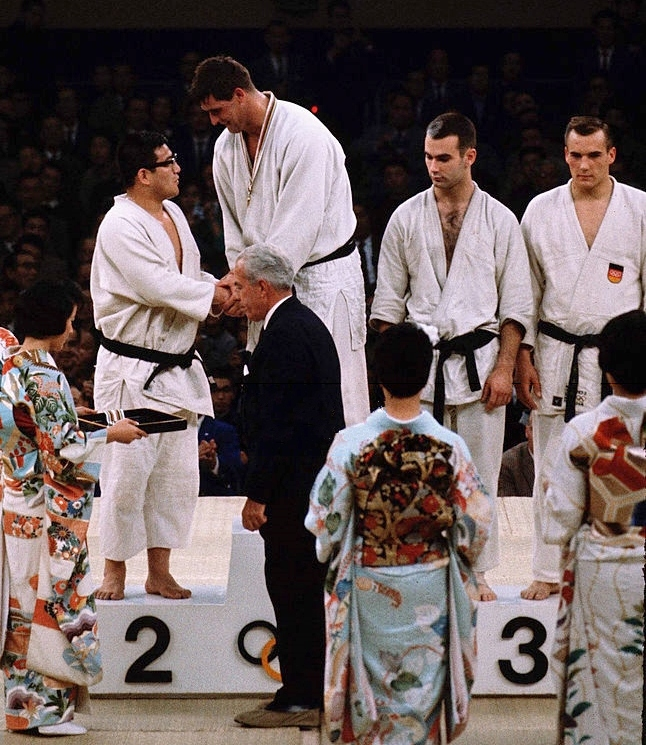
- Left-right: Akio Kaminaga, Anton Geesink, Ted Boronovskis and Klaus Glahn
- Venue: Nippon Budokan
- Date: 23 October 1964
- Competitors: 9 from 9 nations

Medalists
1st place, gold medalist(s)		Anton Geesink	Netherlands
2nd place, silver medalist(s)		Akio Kaminaga	Japan
3rd place, bronze medalist(s)		Theodore Boronovskis	Australia
3rd place, bronze medalist(s)		Klaus Glahn	United Team of Germany

The open category was a judo event held as part of the Judo at the 1964 Summer Olympics programme. The weight class allowed judokas of any weight. The competition was held on Friday, October 23, 1964.

Nine judokas from nine nations competed. The final is featured in the Kon Ichikawa film, Tokyo Olympiad.

== Results ==
=== Elimination round ===
The nine competitors were split into three pools of three. Each pool held a round-robin tournament, with the top competitor from each pool advancing to the semifinals. The second-place judoka from each pool progressed to a relegation pool, where they competed in another round-robin. The winner of this pool then secured the fourth spot in the semifinals.

Pool A

Place	Judoka	Score	Qual.
1	Anton Geesink (NED)	2–0	QQ
2	Akio Kaminaga (JPN)	1–1	QR
3	David Petherbridge (GBR)	0–2	

Pool B

Place	Judoka	Score	Qual.
1	Theodore Boronovskis (AUS)	2–0	QQ
2	John Ryan (IRL)	1–1	QR
3	Ali Hachicha (TUN)	0–2	

Pool C

Place	Judoka	Score	Qual.
1	Klaus Glahn (EUA)	2–0	QQ
2	Ben Nighthorse Campbell (USA)	1–1	
3	Thomas Ong (PHI)	0–2	QR

==== Repechage ====
Campbell's injury, sustained during his match with Glahn, forced him to retire. Ong took his place in the repechage group. Kaminaga defeated both other judokas to move on to the semifinals.

Repechage pool

Place	Judoka	Score	Qual.
1	Akio Kaminaga (JPN)	2–0	QQ
2	John Ryan (IRL)	1–1	
3	Thomas Ong (PHI)	0–2	

=== Knockout rounds ===
The remaining four judokas competed in a single elimination bracket. Both losers in the semifinals won bronze medals. Kaminaga, who had advanced through the repechage, defeated Glahn to earn a rematch against Geesink. Geesink, who had defeated the Japanese judoka in the first round, did so again in the final match.

Semifinals; October 23
1	Anton Geesink (NED)	Sasae-tsuri-komi-ashi
4	Theodore Boronovskis (AUS)	0:12
3	Akio Kaminaga (JPN)	Tai-otoshi
2	Klaus Glahn (EUA)	4:10

Final; October 23
Anton Geesink (NED)	Kesa-gatame
Akio Kaminaga (JPN)	9:22

== Sources ==
- Tokyo Organizing Committee (1964). The Games of the XVIII Olympiad: Tokyo 1964, vol. 2.
