= 1952 European Judo Championships =

1952 Judo European Judo Championships
- Location: Paris, France
- Dates: 9–12 December 1952

Competition at external databases
- Links: JudoInside

The 1952 European Judo Championships were the 2nd edition of the European Judo Championships, and were held in Paris, France, from 9 to 12 December 1952.

== Medal winners ==
Event	Gold	Silver	Bronze
1st kyu	(France) Gilbert Briskine	(Netherlands) Hein Essink	
1st dan	(France) Gilbert Briskine	(Netherlands) Anton Geesink	(France) Poumarat
2nd dan	(Austria) Robert Jaquemond	(France) Bernard Pariset	
3rd dan	(France) Guy Cauquil	(Austria) Franz Nimfuehr	
4th dan	(France) Jean De Herdt		
U 63	(France) Charrière		
U 70	(France) Henri Courtine		
O 80	(France) Jean De Herdt		
open class	(France) Guy Verrier	(Austria) Robert Jaquemond	
