= 1955 European Judo Championships =

1955 Judo European Judo Championships
- Location: Paris, France
- Dates: 4 December 1955

Competition at external databases
- Links: JudoInside

The 1955 European Judo Championships were the 5th edition of the European Judo Championships, and were held in Paris, France on 4 December 1955.

== Medal winners ==
Event	Gold	Silver	Bronze
1st dan	(France) André Colonges	(France) Dominique Demartre	(Netherlands) Willem Dadema (Netherlands) Jan De Waal
2nd dan	(Belgium) Daniel Outelet	(United Kingdom) Douglas Young	(Czechoslovakia) Alexandr Adamec (United Kingdom) Tony Mack
3rd dan	(Netherlands) Anton Geesink	(France) Henri Courtine	(France) André Colonges (Czechoslovakia) Alfred Tompich
4th dan	(France) Jean De Herdt	(France) Robert Sauveniere	
open class	(France) Bernard Pariset	(Netherlands) Anton Geesink	(Belgium) Pierre De Rouck (West Germany) Heinrich Metzler
