= 1954 European Judo Championships =

1954 Judo European Judo Championships
- Location: Brussels, Belgium
- Dates: 10–11 December 1954

Competition at external databases
- Links: JudoInside

The 1954 European Judo Championships were the 4th edition of the European Judo Championships, and were held in Brussels, Belgium, from 10 to 11 December 1954.

== Medal winners ==
| Event | Gold | Silver | Bronze |
|---|---|---|---|
| 1st dan | (Belgium) Daniel Outelet | (France) Gilbert Briskine | (Spain) Enrique Aparicio (France) André Colonges |
| 2nd dan | (France) Michel Dupré | (United Kingdom) Douglas Young | (West Germany) Richard Unterburger (Netherlands) Piet van der Geest |
| 3rd dan | (France) Bernard Parisetl | (France) Lucien Colonges | (United Kingdom) Alfred Grabert (Netherlands) Jan van der Horst |
| open class | (Netherlands) Anton Geesink | (France) Henri Courtine | (France) Guy Cauquil (Italy) Nicola Tempesta |
