= Atemi Ju-Jitsu =

French Japanese-inspired martial art

- Also known as: Pariset Ju-Jitsu (or Jiu-Jitsu)
- Country of origin: France, based on Japanese martial arts
- Creator: Bernard Pariset
- Ancestor arts: Various styles of Jujutsu, Judo, Aikido, Karate, Boxing, Kickboxing

Atemi Ju-Jitsu, in Japanese: Atemi (当て身) Jujutsu (柔術), also called Pariset Ju-Jitsu, was established in France in the 1940s by the late Judo and Ju-Jitsu practitioner Bernard Pariset to revive and preserve old martial techniques inherited from Feudal Japan.

== Overview ==
The Pariset family is sometimes referred to as the 'French Gracie', after having developed their own self-defense Jujitsu style directly inspired from the original Judo and older koryū jujutsu systems developed to train Samurai warriors for defeating an armed and armored opponent on the battlefield. The Pariset family studied directly with Mikonosuke Kawaishi (10th Dan), his assistant Shozo Awazu (9th Dan), and Minoru Mochizuki (10th Dan). Kawaishi was a student of Jigoro Kano - founder of Judo, and Mochizuki was a student of Jigoro Kano, Gichin Funakoshi and Morihei Ueshiba - founders of Shotokan Karate and Aikido respectively.

In Japan, the end of the Samurai class meant that the art of JuJitsu was gradually getting lost. Dangerous techniques were taken away from JuJitsu to render Judo acceptable to the modern Japanese society. The weight of protocols left little room for evolution, but in France, far away from the sphere of influence of Japanese traditions holders, it was ready to return to its martial roots while retaining the safe practice environment created by Kano and benefiting from modern enhancements. Under the influence of Kawaishi and his method of JuJitsu (called ‘ruthless self-defense Judo’, stemming directly from Samurai battlefield combat techniques), the Pariset family revived techniques that were really effective in real-life close combat situations, leaving aside techniques that were superfluous or ineffective. This style is strongly rooted into traditional JuJitsu systems such as Kyushin Ryu, Takenouchi-ryū, Kitō-ryū, Yagyū Shingan-ryū, Yōshin-ryū, Tenjin Shin'yō-ryū, and Daitō-ryū Aiki-jūjutsu (most of which were using atemi extensively before judo limited its use).

The term 'Atemi' has been added to 'Ju-Jitsu' just to remind the critical role played by striking techniques in many traditional Bujutsu styles. Atemi Ju-Jitsu puts a lot of emphasis on body positioning (tai sabaki) and unbalancing techniques (kuzushi) to break the opponent's balance. The use of atemi is particularly important in this system both as a mean to create off-balance and strike vital points to neutralize the opponent, before preparing the transition to other techniques such as locks, twists, throws, pins, and chokes/strangulations. Extensive use of leverage also plays a critical role by providing a mechanical advantage and reducing the use of force.

Atemi Ju-Jitsu includes combinations of striking techniques (atemi-waza), throwing techniques (nage-waza) and grappling techniques (katame-waza), delivered both standing (tachi-waza) and/or on the ground (ne-waza). Practical applications include intense focus on randori and jiyu kumite to confront techniques to real-life scenarios and non passive partners. It combines techniques from traditional jujutsu systems of the Muromachi, Azuchi-Momoyama, Edo and Meiji periods, along with techniques found in Gendai Budo such as judo, karate, aikido and savate. This has produced a very effective and integrated self-defense martial art with ancient roots and traditions.

== History ==
Jigoro Kano sent many of his students outside Japan to demonstrate and teach judo. Among these students, Mitsuyo Maeda and Mikonosuke Kawaishi went to the United States of America. After a long trip across the North and South America, Maeda finally settled in Brazil where he started to teach the Gracie family in the late 1910s/early 1920s a form of judo called Kosen Judo which is mainly focused on ne-waza (ground techniques). The Gracie family building on Maeda's legacy developed a system that would later become known as Gracie Jiu-Jitsu (or Brazilian Jiu-Jitsu).

After an equally long trip across North America and Europe, the second student (Kawaishi) finally settled in France in 1936 where he started to teach Jujitsu to the French Law Enforcement Authorities and to a limited number of students, later supported by his assistant Shozo Awazu. Bernard and Daniel Pariset were among his students. Kawaishi's judo was strongly influenced by traditional jujutsu systems and the art of vital point striking, which led the Pariset family to develop a jujutsu system not exclusively focused on ground grappling (unlike Brazilian Jiu-Jitsu) but also incorporating striking and throwing techniques. This system would later become known as Pariset Ju-Jitsu (or Atemi Ju-Jitsu).

Kawaishi founded the French Judo and Jiu-Jitsu Federation (FFJJJ) in 1946. The FFJJJ, later re-branded to FFJDA, tasked Bernard Pariset in the 1970s with the development of the first official Ju-Jitsu methodology based on Atemi Ju-Jitsu and called 'Self-defence Judo' at the time. With the emergence of competition Judo and Ju-Jitsu, this more traditional combat style became less practised during the 1980s/1990s. The 2000s/2010s saw the revival of Pariset Ju-Jitsu with the emergence of Mixed martial arts (MMA) in the United States and Europe. The Gracie family is performing a similar return to its roots by focusing more and more its teaching on Gracie self-defence as originally practised by Maeda.

Bernard Pariset died in 2004 just before he could be made 10th Dan alongside his long-standing friend and Judo partner Henri Courtine. He was one of the very few non-Japanese to reach the level of 9th Dan and has been officially recognized by the FFJDA (French Judo and Ju-Jitsu Federation) and the IFNB (International Federation Nippon Budo). This title however is not officially recognized by the Kodokan.

== The System and its influences ==
The 'Ju-Jitsu Club Français' was established in 1944 and Bernard Pariset started to teach Judo-Jiu-Jitsu there in parallel to his professional judo career, before becoming its Director until his death. The 'Ju-Jitsu Club Français' was, alongside a few other Parisian dojo, at the epicentre of the expansion of Japanese martial arts in France and Europe.

It was regularly visited by Japanese instructors, first Kawaishi in the 1930s/1940s/1950s and then Awazu in the 1950s/1960s. Both were world-renowned experts, the former for his nage-waza and standing self-defense techniques, and the latter for his ne-waza and ground self-defense techniques. Minoru Mochizuki also paid regular visits to the dojo around the same time. Mochizuki, in addition to being a judo instructor, became the first to teach aikido in the West. Founder of Yoseikan Budo, he had extensively studied old jujutsu systems. At the same time, karate was making its first steps in Europe under the umbrella of the young French Judo Federation, like in Japan under the umbrella of the Kodokan until the Shotokan was later established. As a consequence, the 'Ju-Jitsu Club Français' also witnessed the development of karate under the leadership of Jacques Delcourt and Henri Plee, as well as the expansion of savate or Boxe Francaise (also part of the French Judo Federation). All were practised at the dojo, fostering a process of hybridization (see hybrid martial arts) which influenced the making of Atemi Ju-Jitsu as a modern martial art with ancient roots, techniques and ethics.

== Education Method and Ethics ==
Practitioners are asked to maintain a balance between all elements of the system in order to build a complete martial artist able to face multiple situations, multiple opponents and multiple types of weapons. As a result, their training is evenly split between atemi, nage and katame-waza; and between tachi and ne-waza. A strong emphasis is placed on kihon, kata/bunkai, and gohon kumite to help students work on complex/dangerous technical sequences while avoiding injuries, and kumite / randori to allow students to practice their techniques in real-life environments both standing and on the ground.

Atemi Ju-Jitsu is practiced in dedicated dojo wearing a Gi (white for students and Blue or Black for instructors) and relies on an established protocol for respect and safety purposes. Techniques are taught using original Japanese names and students follow the colour belt system established in the early 20th century by Mikonusoke Kawaishi. This education method is based on Shin-Si-Tai (Spirit-Technique-Body) and a strong code of ethics originating from the Bushido (Samurai warriors Code of Ethics) inspired by Confucianism. The Bushidō code is typified by seven virtues: Rectitude (義 gi), Courage (勇氣 yūki), Benevolence (仁 jin), Respect (禮 rei), Honesty (誠 makoto), Honour (名誉 meiyo), and Loyalty (忠義 chūgi).

A dedicated Atemi Ju-Jitsu Federation with IFNB affiliation exists and includes all dojo practicing this jujutsu style. Atemi Ju-Jitsu is still actively practiced today in France with the Pariset family's legacy kept alive in Europe by Daniel Pariset (8th Dan) and Eric Pariset (7th Dan), and in the United States by Julien Durand (4th Dan). Regular demonstrations are performed during international events such as the Paris-Bercy World Martial Arts Festival.

== Bibliography ==
- 'Judo : progression officielle française' by Bernard Pariset, published in 1969 and 1984 in French
- 'Judo - Formes de projections, Nage No Kata' by Bernard Pariset, published in 1970 in French
- 'Jiu-Jitsu moderne par l'image : Self-défense Judo d'après la progression officielle française' by Bernard Pariset, published in 1972 in French
- 'Nage no Kata; formes de projections' by Bernard Pariset, published in 1970 in French
- 'Atemi Ju-Jitsu moderne : self défense - progression officielle française' par ceintures by Bernard Pariset, published in 1982 in French
- 'Atemi Ju-Jitsu : les 16 techniques et le Goshin-Jitsu' by Bernard Pariset, published in 1991 in French
