= Jean De Herdt =

French judoka (1923–2013)

Personal information
- Born: 22 July 1923
- Died: 5 January 2013 (aged 89)
- Occupation: Judoka

Sport
- Country: France
- Sport: Judo
- Weight class: –100 kg, +100 kg, Open
Medal record
Men's judo
Representing France
European Championships
Gold medal – first place	1951 Paris
Gold medal – first place	1952 Paris

Profile at external databases
- JudoInside.com: 5141

Jean De Herdt (22 July 1923 - 5 January 2013) was a French judoka. De Herdt was the first French student of famed Judo master Mikinosuke Kawaishi. He was a two time gold European Judo Championships medalists.
