= Geof Gleeson =

British judoka (1927–1994)

Personal information
- Nationality: British (English)
- Born: 29 August 1927 Brentford, Middlesex
- Died: February 1994 (aged 66) Enfield, London
- Occupation: Judoka

Sport
- Sport: Judo
Medal record
Representing Great Britain
European Championships
Silver medal – second place	1951 Paris	3rd dan
Silver medal – second place	1951 Paris	open

Geoffrey Robert Gleeson (1927–1994) was a British judoka. Teacher: Trevor Leggett. He went to Japan 1952-55 where he and Charles Palmer were the first westerners to serve as a special research students at the Kodokan Judo Institute. He studied most martial arts: Judo, Kendo, Aikido, Bōjutsu, Jujitsu, Karate, and also studied Zen Buddhism. First kenshusei post World War II. Posthumously awarded 9th Dan.

He won two silver medals at the 1951 European Judo Championships in the 3rd dan and open classes.

He was captain of the first British team to win the European championships and was appointed national coach in 1960.

== Selected publications ==
- Gleeson, Geof (1975) All About Judo, EP Publishing Ltd, Cranford. ISBN 0-7158-0590-8
- Gleeson, Geof (1967) Judo for the West, A.S. Barnes and Company, Cranford.
- Gleeson, Geof (1993) Judo Inside Out: A Cultural Reconciliation, Lepus Books, Wakefield. ISBN 0-86019-100-1
