= 1953 European Judo Championships =

1953 Judo European Judo Championships
- Venue: Royal Albert Hall
- Location: London, United Kingdom
- Dates: 29–30 October 1953

Competition at external databases
- Links: JudoInside

The 1953 European Judo Championships were the 3rd edition of the European Judo Championships, and were held at the Royal Albert Hall in London, England, United Kingdom from 29 to 30 October 1953.

== Medal winners ==
Event	Gold	Silver	Bronze
1st kyu			
1st dan			
2nd dan			
3rd dan			
open class	(Netherlands) Anton Geesink	(France) Bernard Pariset	
Team	(Netherlands)	(France)	
