= 1951 European Judo Championships =

1951 Judo European Judo Championships
- Location: Paris, France
- Dates: 5–6 December 1951

Competition at external databases
- Links: JudoInside

The 1951 European Judo Championships were the 1st edition of the European Judo Championships, and were held in Paris, France, from 5 to 6 December 1951.

== Medal winners ==
Event	Gold	Silver	Bronze
1st kyu	(France) Michel Dupré	(Netherlands) Anton Geesink	(West Germany) Richard Unterburger (Italy) Elio Volpi
1st dan	(France) Bernard Pariset	(West Germany) Horst Schombert	(Austria) Robert Jaquemond (Belgium) Georges Ravinet
2nd dan	(Netherlands) Guy Cauquil	(United Kingdom) John Chaplin	(Netherlands) Dik Koning (Czechoslovakia) Robert Tobler
3rd dan	(France) Jean De Herdt	(United Kingdom) Geof Gleeson	
open class	(France) Jean De Herdt	(United Kingdom) Geof Gleeson	(Austria) Robert Jaquemond (Belgium) Georges Ravinet
