= 1960 European Judo Championships =

1960 Judo European Judo Championships
- Location: Amsterdam, Netherlands
- Dates: 13–15 May 1960

Competition at external databases
- Links: JudoInside

The 1960 European Judo Championships were the 10th edition of the European Judo Championships, and were held in Amsterdam, Netherlands from 13 to 15 May 1960.

== Medal winners ==
Event	Gold	Silver	Bronze
1st dan	(France) Michel Franceschi	(France) Jacques le Berré	(Belgium) Iwijne Derdaens
2nd dan	(France) Jean-Pierre Dessailly	(France) Alphonse Lemoine	(West Germany) Horst Hein
3rd dan	(Belgium) Theo Guldemont	(Italy) Nicola Tempest	(West Germany) Gerhard Alpers
4th dan	(Belgium) Daniel Outelet	(Netherlands) Tonny Wagenaar	(Netherlands) Hein Essink
U68	(West Germany) Matthias Schiessleder	(West Germany) Johann Goor	(Netherlands) Koos Bonte
U80	(West Germany) Heinrich Metzler	(Netherlands) Hein Essink	(Netherlands) Henny van Tergouw
O80	(Netherlands) Anton Geesink	(Italy) Nicola Tempesta	(Czechoslovakia) Jindrich Kadera
open class	(Netherlands) Anton Geesink	(Italy) Nicola Tempesta	(Socialist Federal Republic of Yugoslavia) Stojan Stojakovic
