= Daniel Outelet =

Belgian judoka

Daniël Outelet
Personal information
- Nationality: Belgian
- Citizenship: Belgium
- Born: 11 March 1936 Belgium
- Died: January 13, 1970 (aged 33) Brussels, Belgium
- Occupations: Former international judo champion & judo instructor
- Years active: 1954–1970
- Weight: 80 kg (176 lb)

Sport
- Country: Belgium
- Sport: Judo
- Rank: Ligue Belge de Judo (LBJ) 5th dan
- Club: Poseidon Ryu
- Team: Belgium
- Coached by: Abe Ichirō
Medal record
Men's Judo
Representing Belgium
European Championships
Gold medal – first place	1954 Brussels	1st dan
Gold medal – first place	1955 Paris	2nd dan
Gold medal – first place	1957 Rome	3rd dan
Bronze medal – third place	1957 Rome	Team
Bronze medal – third place	1958 Barcelona	3^{re} dan
Bronze medal – third place	1959 Vienna	4th dan
Gold medal – first place	1960 Amsterdam	4th dan
Bronze medal – third place	1960 Amsterdam	Team
Bronze medal – third place	1961 Milan	4th dan
- Updated on 19 November 2011

Daniël Outelet (11 March 1936 – 1970 ??) was Belgium's first great international judo champion. He is the only male Belgian judoka to have won 4 individual European judo titles (1954, 1955, 1957, 1960). With 9 European medals, over an 8-year period, the only other Belgian male judoka to have achieved even more European medals, was Robert Van De Walle a quarter century later. Outelet's premature death at age 34 deprived Belgium of one of a promising teacher and of one of the country's best judo technicians ever.

== Career ==
Daniël Outelet (together with the late Marcel Clause) is considered as Abe Ichirō's best and most successful judo student. In 1954, in Brussels, he became the first Belgian to win a European judo title in the 1st dan category, after having defeated the Frenchman Briskine. He repeated his success one year later in the 2nd dan category during the 1955 European Championships held in Paris by defeating Douglas Young from Great-Britain.

No European championships were held in 1956, but the next year, in 1957, he won his third title during the Rotterdam European Championships defeating the German Walter Reiter in the 3rd dan category, while also winning a bronze medal in the team championships. He won further bronze medals in the 1958 (Barcelona) and 1959 (Vienna) European championships. In 1960 he won his last European title in Amsterdam defeating the local champion, Dutchman Tony Wagenaar in the 4th dan category, while winning another bronze medal in the team championships. In 1961 he won his last bronze medal (bronze) during the European championships held that year in Milan.

Outelet, however, was unable to obtain the same success during the world championships which were held without weight classes in those days and which favored heavier judoka.

Outelet was the first Belgian judoka to be promoted to the rank of 5th dan. After his competitive career he became the first judo instructor of the newly founded Poseidon-Ryu judo club in Woluwe-Saint-Lambert, a Brussels-Capital Region municipality.

Affected by depression, he committed suicide by hanging in 1970 at the age of 34 after a struggle with what is believed to have been personal problems of a financial nature.

Outelet remains the only male Belgian judoka to have won 4 European titles. He also was a 7-fold national Belgian judo champion. The only other Belgian male judoka to have achieved even more was Robert Van De Walle a quarter century later, with 17 European medals over a 12-year period, an Olympic gold and bronze medal, and 7 World Championship medals (2 silver and 5 bronze).
