= Shokichi Natsui =

Japanese judoka

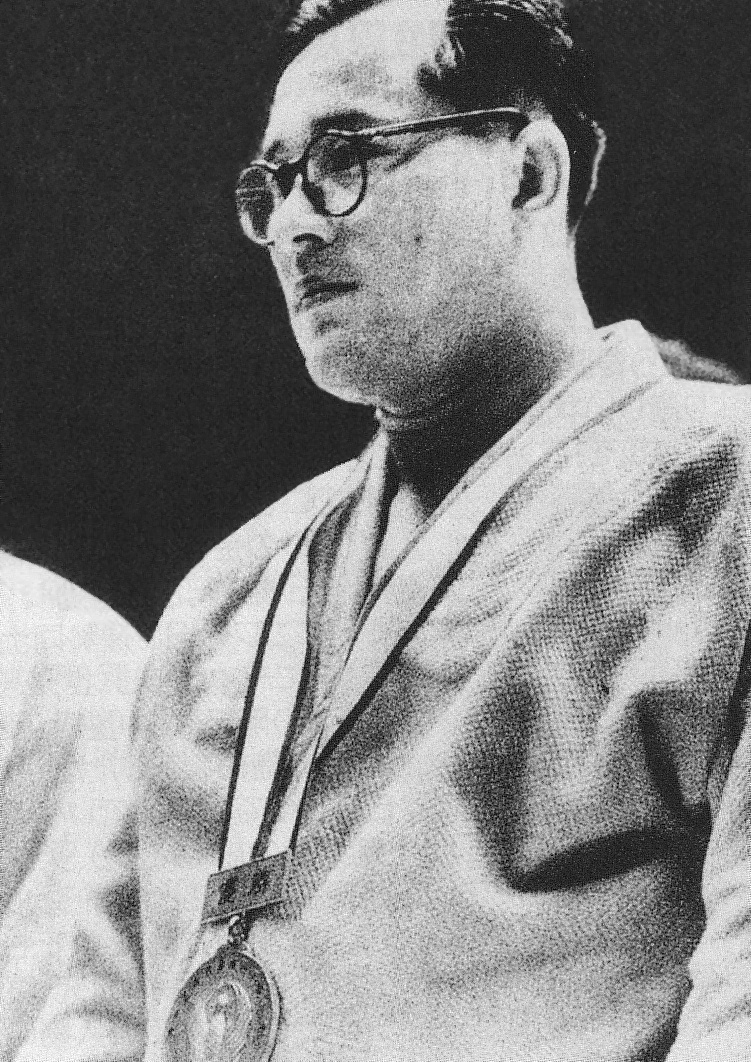
- Shokichi Natsui

Personal information
- Born: 19 October 1925
- Died: 13 September 2006 (aged 80)
- Occupation: Judoka

Sport
- Sport: Judo
Medal record
Men's Judo
Representing Japan
World Championships
Gold medal – first place	1956 Tokyo	Open
All-Japan Championships
Gold medal – first place	1957	Open
Silver medal – second place	1955	Open
Bronze medal – third place	1954	Open

Profile at external databases
- JudoInside.com: 5444

Shokichi Natsui (夏井 昇吉, Natsui Shōkichi; 10 October 1925 – 13 September 2006) was a Japanese judoka from the Akita Prefecture. He became the first world champion in judo, winning the title at the 1956 World Judo Championships in Tokyo, by beating Yoshihiko Yoshimatsu in the final. As there were no weight classes in the world championships until 1965, Natsui was the only champion in 1956.

== First judo world championship ==
=== Background ===
The International Judo Federation (IJF) was founded in 1951, and five years later IJF organized the first World Judo Championships, held in Tokyo on 5 March 1956.

=== Contestants ===
Natsui and his teammate Yoshimatsu, both policemen, were the two highest-ranked judoka at the championship; the 36-year-old Yoshimatsu held the rank of nanadan (7th dan), and Natsui rokudan (6th dan), while Pariset from France held yondan (4th dan), and future three-time world champion Anton Geesink from the Netherlands held sandan (3rd dan). The 1956 championship had 31 competitors from 21 countries.

=== Natsui's matches ===
In the first round Natsui took only 3 seconds to eliminate the contestant from Cambodia, with the shoulder throw seoi nage. In the second round he met Johannsen from Denmark, and won after 8 seconds, with tai otoshi. The match against Woodrey from Belgium in round 3 lasted 44 seconds, with victory going to Natsui. In the semi-final he met Henri Courtine from France; this match lasted only 8 seconds, with a tai otoshi win to Natsui. In total, Natsui reached the final with a total combined match time of only 63 seconds. The final between Natsui and Yoshimatsu ended with victory to Natsui.

== All-Japan Judo Championships ==
Natsui competed several times at the All-Japan Judo Championships in Nippon Budokan in Tokyo—one of the three major tournaments, together with the Olympic Games and the World Championships. In 1951 he finished 8th, he finished 16th in 1952, and 8th again in 1953. He received a bronze medal in 1954, a silver medal in 1955 (losing to Yoshimatsu in the final), and a gold medal in 1957. The All-Japan Judo Championships where not held in 1956 because of the inaugural World Championship competition.
