= John Ryan (judoka) =

Irish judoka

Personal information
- Born: 9 September 1934 Ballymote, Ireland
- Died: 17 May 1989 (aged 54) Ilford, England
- Occupation: Judoka

Sport
- Sport: Judo
Medal record
Representing United Kingdom
European championships
| Bronze medal – third place | 1961 Milan | Open (3rd dan) |
| Bronze medal – third place | 1962 Essen | Open (3rd dan) |

Profile at external databases
- JudoInside.com: 4992

John Ryan (9 September 1934 – 17 May 1989) fought the silver medalist Akio Kaminaga in the 1964 Tokyo Summer Olympics for Ireland in the open class judo competition.
