= Takeshi Koga =

Japanese judoka

Medal record

Representing Japan

Judo

World Championships
| Bronze medal – third place | 1961 Paris | Open |

Takeshi Koga (古賀 武, Koga Takeshi, born 11 May 1939) is a retired Japanese judoka.

Koga is from Kokura, Fukuoka and began judo at the junior high school days. In 1961, When he was a student of Nihon University, was chosen to represent Japan in the World Championship held in Paris and got a bronze medal.

Koga began working for the Yawata Steel after graduation from university in 1962.

Koga also participated All-Japan Championships 8 times and won a bronze medal in 1965.

== Achievements ==
- 1959 - All-Japan University Championships 2nd
- 1960 - All-Japan University Championships 3rd
- 1961 - World Championships (Openweight only) 3rd

- All-Japan University Championships 1st

- 1965 - All-Japan Championships (Openweight only) 3rd
