= 1958 World Judo Championships =

Judo competition

Judo 1958 Men's World Judo Championships
- Venue: Tokyo Metropolitan Gymnasium
- Location: Tokyo, Japan
- Date: 30 November 1958
- Competitors: 39 from 18 nations

Competition at external databases
- Links: IJF • JudoInside

The 1958 World Judo Championships were the second edition of the men's World Judo Championships, and were held in Tokyo, Japan on 30 November, 1958.

== Medal overview ==
=== Men ===
Event	Gold	Silver	Bronze
Open	(Japan) Koji Sone	(Japan) Akio Kaminaga	(France) Bernard Pariset (Japan) Kimiyoshi Yamashiki

=== Medal table ===
Rank	Nation	Gold	Silver	Bronze	Total
1	Japan (JPN)	1	1	1	3
2	France (FRA)	0	0	1	1
Totals (2 entries)		1	1	2	4
