= 2009 European Team Judo Championships – Men's team =

Judo competition

Judo Men's team at the 2009 European Team Judo Championships
- Venue: Miskolc Sports Hall
- Location: Miskolc, Hungary
- Date: 3 October
- Nations: 5

Medalists
gold medal	Hungary (1st title)
silver medal	Russia
bronze medal	France

Competition at external databases
- Links: EJU • JudoInside

The men's team competition at the 2009 European Team Judo Championships was held on 3 October at the Miskolc Sports Hall in Miskolc, Hungary.

== Results ==
=== Group A ===
Pos	Team	Pld	W	L	PF	PA	PD	Pts	Result	HUN	UKR	ROU
1	Hungary	2	2	0	7	3	+4	4	Advance to final	—	4–1	3–2
2	Ukraine	2	1	1	5	5	0	3	Advance to bronze medal match	—	—	4–1
3	Romania	2	0	2	3	7	−4	2	5th place	—	—	—

=== Bracket ===
Playoff bracket:

Group B
Russia	4
France	1

Final
Hungary	3
Russia	2
Third place
Ukraine	1
France	4
