= 1961 World Judo Championships =

Judo competition

Judo 1961 Men's World Judo Championships
- Venue: Stade Pierre de Coubertin
- Location: Paris, France
- Dates: 2–3 December 1961
- Competitors: 57 from 25 nations

Competition at external databases
- Links: IJF • JudoInside

The 1961 World Judo Championships were the third edition of the men's World Judo Championships, and were held in Paris, France on 2 December 1961. The 1961 tournament was notable for Anton Geesink for being the first non-Japanese judoka to win gold at the World Judo Championship.

== Medal overview ==
=== Men ===
| Event | Gold | Silver | Bronze |
|---|---|---|---|
| Open | (Netherlands) Anton Geesink | (Japan) Koji Sone | (South Korea) Kim Ui-Tae (Japan) Takeshi Koga |

=== Medal table ===
| Rank | Nation | Gold | Silver | Bronze | Total |
|---|---|---|---|---|---|
| 1 | Netherlands (NED) | 1 | 0 | 0 | 1 |
| 2 | Japan (JPN) | 0 | 1 | 1 | 2 |
| 3 | South Korea (KOR) | 0 | 0 | 1 | 1 |
| Totals (3 entries) | | 1 | 1 | 2 | 4 |
