= Theodore Boronovskis =

Australian Olympic judoka

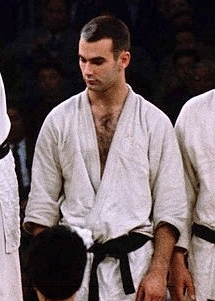
- Ted Boronovskis at the 1964 Olympics

Personal information
- Born: 27 July 1943 (age 82) Latvia
- Occupation: Judoka
- Height: 1.83 m (6 ft 0 in)
- Weight: 104 kg (229 lb)

Sport
- Country: Australia
- Sport: Judo
- Club: Langridge's Health Academy of Physical Sciences, Sydney

Achievements and titles
- Olympic Games: (bronze) (1964)
- World Champ.: R32 (1965)
- Oceania Champ.: (silver) (1965)
Medal record
Men's judo
Representing Australia
Olympic Games
| Bronze medal – third place | 1964 Tokyo | Open |
Oceania Championships
| Silver medal – second place | 1965 Auckland | Heavyweight |

Profile at external databases
- IJF: 54644
- JudoInside.com: 4670
- Updated on 25 June 2023

Theodore Boronovskis (born 27 July 1943) is an Australian judoka who won a bronze medal at the 1964 Summer Olympics. This was Australia's only Olympic medal in judo until 2000.

Judo made its Olympic debut in 1964, and Boronovskis was Australia's only judo representative, competing in the open division (unlimited weight). He won his first two matches, but then lost to the eventual gold medalist, Anton Geesink.

In later life Ted Boronovskis was employed as an advocate and industrial officer for the Merchant Service Guild. He spent many years representing Guild members in the Western Australian offshore oil and gas industry up to the late 1990s.
