= Marcel Clause =

Belgian judoka

Personal information
- Nationality: Belgian
- Born: April 4, 1927 Lessines, Belgium
- Died: April 27, 2004 (aged 77) Boussu, Belgium
- Occupation: Judo Instructor
- Years active: 1952–2004
- Employer(s): Ligue Francophone de Judo & Belgian Judo Federation
- Spouse: Madeleine Busieaux (1947–2004)

Sport
- Country: Belgium
- Sport: Judo
- Rank: Kodokan 8th dan
- Club: Judo Club Wasmuel (later renamed: Royal Judo Club Marcel Clause)
- Team: Belgium
- Coached by: Robert Plomb, Ichiro Abe

Achievements and titles
- Highest world ranking: Kodokan & LFJ 8th dan
- Updated on 24 November 2012

Marcel Clause (April 4, 1927 – April 27, 2004) was a leading Belgian judo educator, international referee and former international judo athlete and former national coach. He was one of only three non-Japanese people ever to be awarded the high rank of judo 8th dan by the Kodokan Judo Institute in Tokyo, Japan.

== Early life ==
Clause was born in Lessines, a Walloon municipality in the province of Hainaut, Belgium. He took up judo at the relatively late age of 23. His teacher was Robert Plomb, at the time a brown belt (1st kyu). Before, Clause had been a middle-distance runner.

== Career ==
Clause's technical skills in judo rapidly progressed after having encountered Ichiro Abe, a Japanese Kodokan delegate to Europe, who in 1954 became the new Technical Director of the Belgian Judo Federation. Together with threefold European champion, the late Daniel Outelet, Clause became Abe's most skillful student excelling in both randori and judo kata. Though only a middle-weight, Clause won the 1960 national championships in the 2nd dan category. In 1963, 1964 and 1966 he won the Belgian National Trophy, which served as the virtual national championships per weight category. At the time of his last victory he was near 40 years old ! Clause was also part of the 1960 bronze- and 1963 silver medal-winning Belgian national team in the European Judo Championships for Teams.

After the departure of Ichiro Abe to Japan Clause was appointed by the Belgian Judo Federation to be in charge of the technical development of its members.

He held the position of national coach for two years, and was the liaison between the Belgian Judo Federation and ADEPS, i.e., the Ministry of the French Community of Belgium charged with the promotion of sport and physical education amongst the population of the French-speaking community, which organized the courses and issued the diploma's to the French-speaking candidate judo instructors and coaches.

Clause was in charge of the national technical trainings and judo kata clinics organized each once per month on the second and fourth Thursday, resp., in Elsene and Etterbeek. Clause displayed an uncommon technical refinement for a non-Japanese judoka due to his master-ship of kuzushi, control and accuracy in timing. His personal motto was “Jamais parfait, toujours perfectible ...” [Never perfect, always perfectible].

Clause left a lasting impression on his most notable students, the majority of them Walloon (e.g., Michel Kozlowski, Franz Soleil and others), though there also exist a few examples at the Flemish side of some of his most inspired students (e.g., Carl De Crée).

In 1978, Clause became the third person to be promoted by the (unitary) Belgian Judo Federation to the judo rank of 6th dan. In 1987 he was part of a group of four people (the others were Jean-Marie Falise, Théo Guldemont, and Pierre De Rouck) who became the first Belgian judoka to hold the rank of 7th dan. By then the Belgian Judo Federation had split, hence why the promotion was authorized by its regional subfederation, the Ligue Francophone de Judo and by the Kodokan. In 1997 Clause became the first Belgian (together with Théo Guldemont) to be awarded the high judo rank of 8th dan. Kodokan criteria required a number of more years to expire before this eclectic judo institution in Tokyo made the exceptional step to elevate Clause as only the second non-Japanese ever to the rank of Kodokan 8th dan. Despite possessing judo skills that in purity exceeded those of many Japanese judo masters, Clause's international teaching profile remained modest, presumably due to limited language abilities; Clause only spoke French although he did understand Dutch. However, Clause was given the rare honor of having been the first (and to this day possibly the only) non-Japanese to be requested by the Kodokan to teach a formal judo class at the Kodokan.

No professionally shot videos of Clause's judo are commercially available or even known to exist. Local culture made it uncommon for people present during clinics to videotape the demonstrations. Therefore, only a limited number of amateur clips showing Clause have been discovered and made available online. The Ligue Francophone de Judo in the 1970s for archival purposes did record a number of teaching videos showing Clause performing the gokyo, but none of the material has been released yet.

Clause died on the 27 April 2004 due to acute cardiovascular complications. Following his death, the Ligue Francophone du Judo, a regional Walloon subfederation of the Belgian Judo Federation, created the yearly International Marcel Clause Kata Tournament.

== Bibliography ==
- Katame-waza pratique.
