= 2026 European Mixed Team Judo Championships =

Judo 2026 European Mixed Team Judo Championships
- Venue: Aleksandar Nikolić Hall
- Location: Belgrade, Serbia
- Date: 7 November
- Competitors: 113 from 13 nations

Medalists
gold medal	Egor Andoni; Timur Arbuzov; Kamila Badurova; Denis Batchaev; Valeriy Endovitskiy; Tamara Lishchenko; Olga Mukhina; Daria Rechkalova; Buian-Kherel Sanaa; Elis Startseva; Shamil Zilfikarov; Irina Zueva	Russia
silver medal	Irakli Demetrashvili; Nino Gulbani; Luka Javakhishvili; Eteri Liparteliani; Nino Loladze; Luka Maisuradze; Lasha Shavdatuashvili; Sophio Somkhishvili; Guram Tushishvili; Tengo Zirakashvili	Georgia
bronze medal	Emir Selim Arı; Ecem Baysuğ; Muhammed Demirel; Recep Ergin; Aysenur Karadag; Fidan Ögel; Hilal Öztürk; Ejder Toktay	Turkey
bronze medal	Célia Cancan; Mathilde Chabal; Tieman Diaby; Clémence Eme; Martha Fawaz; Léa Fontaine; Tizie Gnamien; Astride Gneto; Maxime Gobert; Aleksa Mitrovic; Eliot Preve; Yann Rigaud	France

Champions
- Mixed team: Russia (2nd title)

Competition at external databases
- Links: IJF • JudoInside

The 2026 European Mixed Team Judo Championships will be held at the Aleksandar Nikolić Hall in Belgrade, Serbia, on 7 November 2026.

== Results ==
=== Main draw ===
Round of 16
Hungary	4
Belarus	2
Italy	2
Serbia	4
France	4
Romania	2
Austria	4
Ukraine	3
Turkey	4
Greece	0

Quarter-finals
Georgia	4
Hungary	2
Serbia	3
France	4
Russia	4
Austria	0
Germany	1
Turkey	4

Semi-finals
Georgia	4
France	3
Russia	4
Turkey	0

Final
Georgia	1
Russia	4

=== Repechage ===
Repechage
Hungary	0
Serbia	4
Austria	1
Germany	4

Bronze medal
Serbia	1
Turkey	4
Germany	2
France	3
