= Koji Sone =

Japanese judoka

Personal information
- Born: 14 November 1928
- Died: 27 April 1981 (aged 52)
- Occupation: Judoka

Sport
- Sport: Judo
Medal record
Men's Judo
Representing Japan
World Championships
Gold medal – first place	1958 Tokyo	Open
Silver medal – second place	1961 Paris	Open

Profile at external databases
- JudoInside.com: 5480

Koji Sone (曽根 康治, Sone Kōji; November 14, 1928 – April 27, 1981) was a Japanese judoka and world champion.

He was born in the city Chichibu, Saitama and started judo in his childhood. His father was a 6th Dan in judo and his uncle a 9th Dan. Sone is a university-trained judoka from Meiji University. After that he belonged to Fuji Iron & Steel. As fifth dan, measuring 5 feet and 10 1/2 inches in height and weighing 215 pounds, he received a gold medal at the 1958 World Judo Championships in Tokyo against teammate and 4th dan Akio Kaminaga. Sone was surprisingly eliminated in the second round of the 1960 All-Japan Judo Championships, a contemporary report by the martial artist Donn F. Draeger calling his performance there a "pitiful sight" and mentioning that he was aging. Sone won a silver medal at the 1961 World Judo Championships in Paris, behind Anton Geesink. His loss against Geesink, 5th dan, was heralded as the end of the era in which the best Japanese judokas could not be defeated by foreigners. Within nine minutes of the 20-minute contest, a foot sweep forced Sone onto the ground where he was held for the necessary 30 seconds with a Mune-gatame. Despite that, many believed that Sone was the technically better judoka. At the age of 33 Sone was relatively old for a judoka. It would be the last World Championship without a division into weight classes. After the loss against Geesink, Sone became coach of the Japanese judo team. Sone was accused by Geesink's teammates in the 1965 World Judo Championships of having Seiji Sakaguchi lose against the more rested Matsunaga to have Matsunaga take on the weary Geesink in the final round. Matsunaga still lost, Geesink winning the heavy-weight title by decision. But the Japanese team hoped to beat him with Isao Inokuma in the all-weight class the next day. Before the match, however, Geesink quit. The jubilant Japanese team carried Sone on their shoulders and paraded him around the gym. In 1977 he achieved the rank of 8th Dan. In 1981 he died of cerebral hemorrhage in Tokyo.

== Achievements ==
- 1954 - All-Japan Championships (Openweight only) loss
- 1955 - All-Japan Championships (Openweight only) 3rd
- 1957 - All-Japan Championships (Openweight only) 2nd
- 1958 - World Championships (Openweight only) 1st

- All-Japan Championships (Openweight only) 1st

- 1961 - World Championships (Openweight only) 2nd
