= Shozo Awazu =

Japanese judoka (1923-2016)

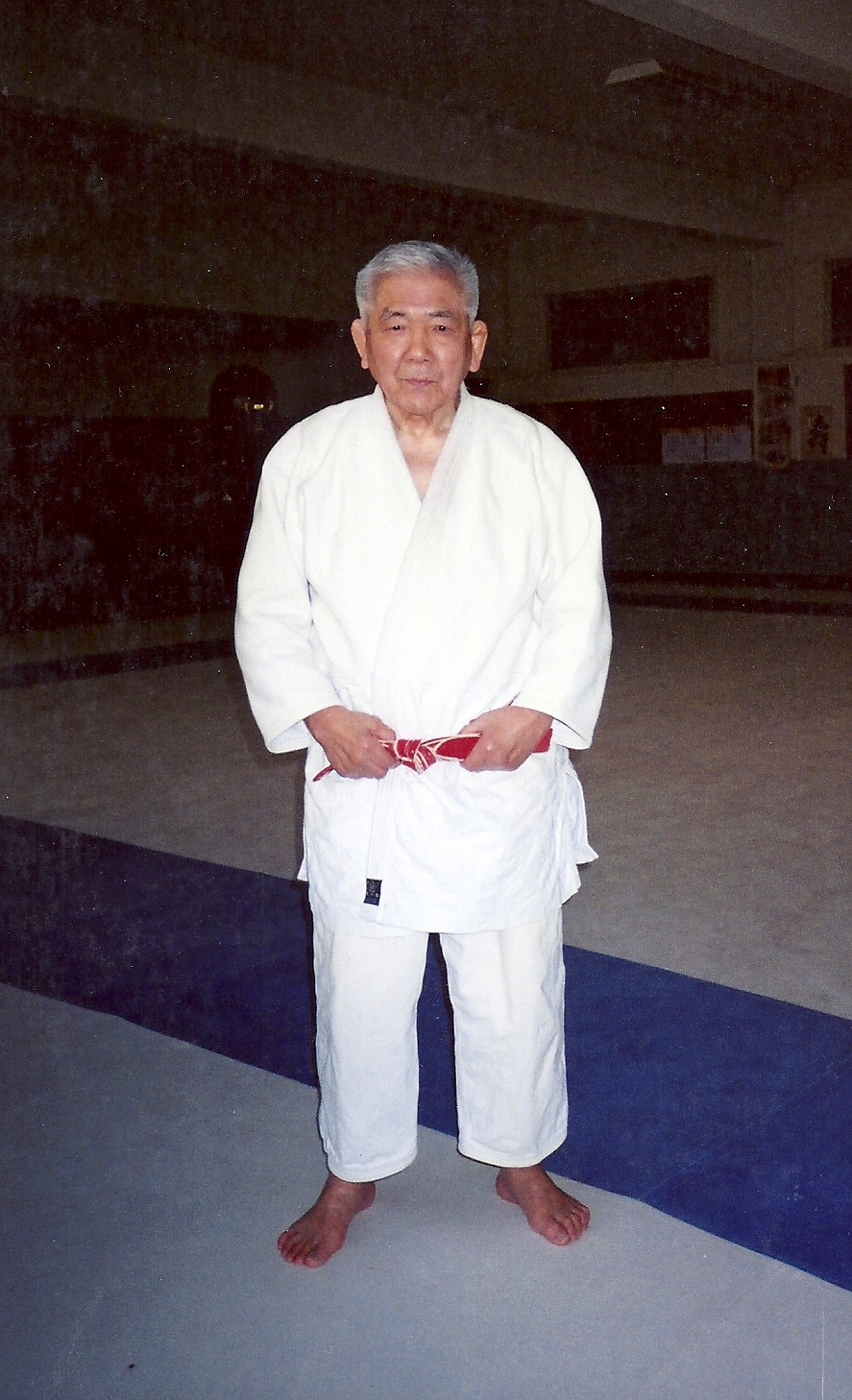
- Born: 18 April 1923; Kyoto, Japan
- Died: 17 March 2016 (aged 92)
- Style: Judo
- Rank: Kōdōkan 9th Dan

Other information
- Notable students: Henri Courtine; Bernard Pariset

Shozo Awazu (粟津 正蔵, Awazu Shōzō; April 18, 1923 – March 17, 2016) was a Japanese master of judo who achieved the rank of Kōdōkan 9th Dan. He led the development of judo in France.

== Biography ==
Shozo Awazu was born in Kyoto in 1923. He came to France in 1950 and assisted Mikinosuke Kawaishi in introducing judo in France.

He was the teacher of Henri Courtine and Bernard Pariset. From 1953 to 2014, he was professor of judo at the Racing Club de France in Paris.

Awazu was considered to be one of the top experts in ne waza (grappling techniques), kata and tandoku-renshu.

== Bibliography ==
- Shozo Awazu, 1963. Méthode de judo au sol. Editions Publi-Judo, Paris. Reprinted Chiron-Sports, Paris, 1974.
- Emmanuel Charlot, 2004. L'esprit du judo. Awazu : l'exemple. Judo magazine, n° 216, Paris, p. 60-63.

== Filmography ==
- Camille de Casabianca, Tatami, 2003.
