= 2009 European Team Judo Championships – Women's team =

Judo competition

Judo Women's team at the 2009 European Team Judo Championships
- Venue: Miskolc Sports Hall
- Location: Miskolc, Hungary
- Date: 3 October
- Nations: 3

Medalists
gold medal	Russia (2nd title)
silver medal	France
bronze medal	Hungary

Competition at external databases
- Links: EJU • JudoInside

The women's team competition at the 2009 European Team Judo Championships was held on 3 October at the Miskolc Sports Hall in Miskolc, Hungary.

== Results ==
Pos	Team	Pld	W	L	PF	PA	PD	Pts	Result	RUS	FRA	HUN
1	Russia	2	2	0	75	17	+58	4	Champions	—	4–1	4–1
2	France	2	1	1	37	50	−13	3	Runner up	—	—	3–2
3	Hungary	2	0	2	25	70	−45	2	3rd place	—	—	—
