= 1961 European Judo Championships =

1961 Judo European Judo Championships
- Location: Milan, Italy
- Date: 13 May 1961

Competition at external databases
- Links: JudoInside

The 1961 European Judo Championships were the 11th edition of the European Judo Championships, and were held in Milan, Italy on 13 May 1961.

== Medal winners ==
Event	Gold	Silver	Bronze
1st dan	(East Germany) Herbert Niemann	(France) Yves Reymond	
2nd dan	(Netherlands) Jan van Ierland	(France) Lionel Grossain	
3rd dan	(France) Jean-Pierre Dessailly	(Netherlands) Willem Dadema	
4th dan	(Italy) Nicola Tempesta	(Belgium) Theo Guldemont	(Netherlands) Hein Essink (Belgium) Daniel Outelet
U68	(France) Claude Mesenburg	(France) André Bourreau	
U80	(West Germany) Heinrich Metzler	(Austria) Paul Kunisch	
O80	(Netherlands) Anton Geesink	(East Germany) Herbert Niemann	(Socialist Federal Republic of Yugoslavia) Borivoje Cvejic (West Germany) Franz Sinek
open class	(Netherlands) Anton Geesink	(France) Michel Bourgoin	
