= 1956 World Judo Championships =

Judo competition

Judo 1956 Men's World Judo Championships
- Venue: Kuramae Kokugikan
- Location: Tokyo, Japan
- Date: 3 May 1956
- Competitors: 31 from 21 nations

Competition at external databases
- Links: IJF • JudoInside

The 1956 World Judo Championships were the first edition of the men's World Judo Championships, and were held at the Kuramae Kokugikan in Tokyo, Japan on 3 May 1956.

== Medal overview ==
=== Men ===
Event	Gold	Silver	Bronze
Open	(Japan) Shokichi Natsui	(Japan) Yoshihiko Yoshimatsu	(France) Henri Courtine (Netherlands) Anton Geesink

=== Medal table ===
Rank	Nation	Gold	Silver	Bronze	Total
1	Japan (JPN)	1	1	0	2
2	France (FRA)	0	0	1	1
2	Netherlands (NED)	0	0	1	1
Totals (3 entries)		1	1	2	4
