= Harry Maguire (sailor) =

Irish sailor (1928–2007)

Harry Maguire (6 July 1928 – 18 August 2007) was an Irish sailor who competed in the 1964 Summer Olympics.
