= 2021 European Kata Judo Championships =

- Location: Warsaw, Poland
- Start date: 3 July 2021
- End date: 4 July 2021

The 2021 European Kata Judo Championships was a judo competition. It took place from 3–4 July 2021.

== Medal summary ==
Some competitions did not have a bronze medal.

=== Medal table ===
* Host nation (Host)

Rank	Nation	Gold	Silver	Bronze	Total
1	Italy	3	0	1	4
2	Netherlands	2	2	0	4
3	Spain	2	1	0	3
4	Austria	1	3	0	4
5	Romania	1	0	0	1
5	Russia	1	0	0	1
7	Poland*	0	2	4	6
8	Portugal	0	1	0	1
8	Slovenia	0	1	0	1
10	Hungary	0	0	1	1
Totals (10 entries)		10	10	6	26

=== Results ===
Event	Gold	Silver	Bronze
Nage No Kata Group 1	Netherlands; Erik Faes; Niels Neumann	Spain; Unai Saralegui Vallejo; Unai Reguillaga Eizaguirre	Poland; Bartosz Machna; Dawid Kajdy
Katame No Kata Group 1	Russia; Dmitry Yung; Sergey Shchetinskiy	Austria; Vanessa Wenzl; Matthias Heinrich	Poland; Lukasz Proksa; Marek Tarabura
Ju No Kata Group 1	Romania; Alina Zaharia; Alina Cheru	Austria; Hanna Peinsipp; Paula Peinsipp	Italy; Laura Bugo; Barbara Bruni Cerchier
Kime No Kata Group 1	Italy; Yuri Ferretti; Andrea Giani Contini	Netherlands; Mischa Fransen; Yoeri Fransen	No bronze medal
Kodokan Goshin Jutsu Group 1	Spain; Juana Maria Sanso Puigserver; Llorenc Gaya Puigserver	Slovenia; Benjamin Mehic; Darko Krasovec	Hungary; Anna Cservenak; Eniko Dr Sari
Nage No Kata Group 2	Italy; Mauro Collini; Tommaso Rondinini	Austria; Martin Hinteregger; Phillip Hinteregger	No bronze medal
Katame No Kata Group 2	Netherlands; Tycho van der Werff; David Lefevere	Poland; Beata Sypniewska; Sebastian Gembalczyk	No bronze medal
Ju No Kata Group 2	Italy; Giovanni Tarabelli; Angelica Tarabelli	Netherlands; Ruud van Zwieten; Koen Vermeule	No bronze medal
Kime No Kata Group 2	Austria; Robert Hatzl; Franz Winter	Poland; Zbigniew Wojtowicz; Jacek Kutyba	Poland; Robert Taraszkiewicz; Michal Taraszkiewicz
Kodokan Goshin Jutsu Group 2	Spain; Fernando Blas Pérez; Uchan Chung Seu	Portugal; Pedro Gonclaves; Paulo Moreira	Poland; Leszek Piastka; Anna Jagiello
