= Thomas Ong (judoka) =

Filipino judoka

Personal information
- Full name: Chi Hong Ong
- Nationality: Filipino
- Born: March 8, 1938 (age 88)
- Height: 5 ft 8 in (173 cm)
- Weight: 159 lb (72 kg)

Sport
- Sport: Judo

Chi Hong "Thomas" Ong (born March 8, 1938) is a Filipino judoka. He competed in the men's open category event at the 1964 Summer Olympics.
