= Eddie Kelliher =

Irish sailor

Edward J Kelliher (8 March 1920 - 1 June 2017) was a sailor and businessman from Ireland. He maintained a membership with the Royal Irish Yacht Club in Dun Laoghaire for over 62 years, and became the first Olympian to be associated with the club. He participated in the 1964 Summer Olympics which took place in Tokyo, Japan, the first time an Olympic tournament took place in Asia. Alongside a career in sailing, he also became chairman in the O’Connell street branch of the well-known Irish bookstore, Easons, as well as becoming the president of the Dublin Chamber of Commerce. He later died at 98 years of age, with his funeral taking place in Dun Laoghaire, where he spent much of his adult life.

== Early life ==
Eddie Kelliher was born in the town of Tralee, County Kerry, on the 8 March 1920. He grew up alongside his sister Sue McKenna (Nee Kelliher) before moving to Dublin as a teenager. His family had a long history of attending Castleknock College in Country Dublin and Kelliher went on to continue this trend by attending the school as a boarding student throughout his teenage years following the move to the capital from his place of birth. At a similar time, Kelliher began to develop an interest in the water and in sailing. His first experiences in sailing did not occur until he was fifteen years old, and these took place off Fenit harbour, Tralee.

From an early age Kelliher was surrounded by an entrepreneurial atmosphere, as the Kelliher family were known as general merchants and millers since 1859. Following the completion of his studies at Castleknock, Kelliher did a year long apprenticeship within the family business. At that time, many of the workers who joined a family business remained in that company for the rest of their lives, however, Kelliher moved on to other roles within different companies. Kelliher would later become a chairman in Eason's as well as the president of Dublin Chamber of Commerce in 1978.

== Family life ==
Hailing from a family of millers and general merchants since 1859, Eddie Kelliher was the only son of Maurice A. and Ellen Kelliher, who married in 1918. Kelliher had two sisters, Susan McKenna and Mary Walsh. Kelliher's father, Maurice A., the second son of Maurice J., was managing director of the family firm, M. Kelliher & Sons (1935) Ltd. until it was acquired by Edward, Maurice P. And John J. Kelliher in 1951. The family lived at “Park na Doon” house in Oakpark, Tralee. The property, which was built by its previous owner, William H. McCowen in 1882, is a detached five-bay three-storey house featuring an on-site tennis court; an addition that was laid out by the Kelliher family. They resided there from the early 1920s until the 1950s when the family moved to Listowel soon after Maurice stepped down from the family firm. Prior to the family moving to Listowel, Eddie met Doreen (née O’Sullivan), a Valentia native, in 1940, whom he would eventually marry five years later on 16 August 1945. The couple had three sons, Desmond, Malcolm and St John; and six daughters; Christine, Laura, Brenda, Judith, Felicity and Genevieve. Two of Kelliher's daughters, Christine and Laura, have died. However, as of his memoriam, it is noted that he is survived by his twelve grandchildren and four great-grandchildren. One of his granddaughters, Daisy Kelliher, has been a cast member on the TV series Below Deck Sailing Yacht since season 2.

== Career in sailing ==
Kelliher began sailing at the age of 15 in Fenit Tralee, in an old canoe that was given to him by his uncle. After moving to Dublin in 1952, Kelliher joined the Royal Irish Yacht Club in Dun Laoghaire as a member in 1954. He was a member in the Royal Irish for over 62 years. He spent most of his sailing career here.

In 1961 Kelliher competed in the Edinburgh Cup Competition on the Firth of Clyde. Kelliher's boat was the sole boat from Dun Laoghaire at the event. The boat suffered many breakages at this event, including a broken kicker strap and parted spinnaker halyard, however Kelliher's results prior to this aided his selection to go to the Olympics.

In the lead up to the Olympics, Kelliher continued to sail as a member in the Royal Irish Yacht Club. In preparation, he competed in their 1963 End Of Season race in his own Dragon keelboat named 'ysolde'. He finished first place in this event with a time of 6 hours 55 minutes and 2 seconds. 'Saphire of osyth' in 2nd position and 'verve' in 3rd.

In 1964, Kelliher was nominated by the then Irish Yachting Association, now the Irish Sailing Association to compete in the Tokyo Summer Olympics 1964 for sailing. He was helmsman in the mixed three person dragon keelboat category with Harry Maguire and Robert Dalton. They chartered the boat named 'Akatombo', where they finished in 20th place out of a total of 23 boats. Kelliher and his two crew mates had a total of 1'331 points in the event.

In 1965 a year after his Olympics debut, Kelliher competed in the first Dragon keel boat World Championships in Sweden with his wife Doreen Kelliher (née O'Sullivan) as his crew.

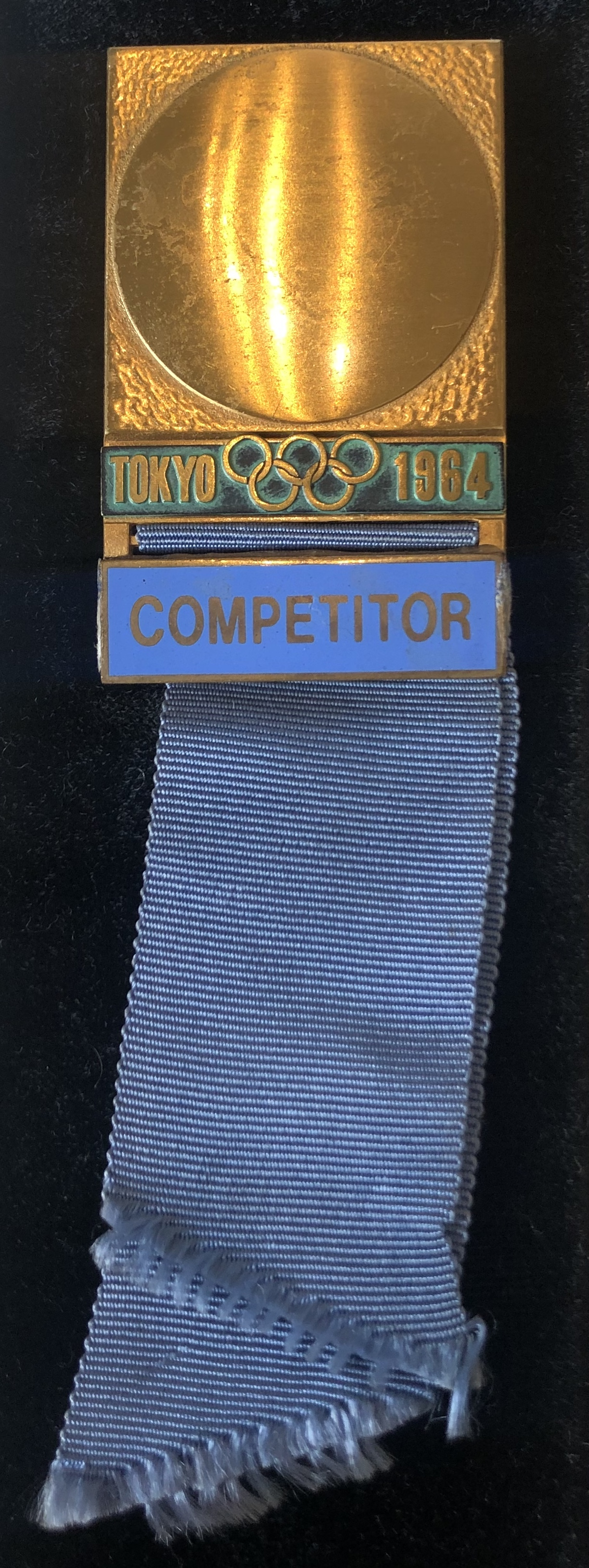
Eddie Kelliher 1964 Tokyo Olympics Competitor medal

== Later life and death ==
After retiring from his competitive sailing career, he carried on sailing with his wife, Dooren. Kelliher and Doreen traveled together through many places such as the Mediterranean. Regularly following the same ways of classical figures such as Ulysses. They owned a cruising boat in Mallorca, where they both lived for a few years before returning to Ireland.

Upon returning to Dublin Kelliher discovered his family business was not substantial enough to support both his families. He decided to sell his share to one of his cousins. Kelliher was interested in new modern business developments. In 1948 he went to research and look at the new self-service checkouts in Sainburys and Dairy express in England. Soon after this the Irish Management Institute started. He made an unsuccessful application for a position as the chief executive officer. Jack Eason was on the interview board at the time and was impressed with Kelliher and later asked him to join the Eason and Son Limited group. He was the manager of the shop in O’Connell Street. Kelliher was quickly promoted throughout the years. Becoming a director in 1957 and soon after in 1970 he was appointed a managing director. 10 years later he was chairman of the group until his retirement in 1984. He is credited with developing Easons into a well-known nationwide business that lives on in every city in Ireland.

Kelliher was appointed to the Industrial Relations Commissions. This is the government courts that are set up by the country/state to manage and decide on industrial and employment issues, between employers and employees. He was president of the Dublin chamber of commerce in 1978–1979. The issues he tackles were related to wildcat strikes which involved fines on trade unions and reductions in certain activities that were important to the nation's economy. Many of the decisions he made resulted in headlines regarding the abolition of the state monopolies and for Ireland's social welfare system to be simplified.

As well as being a family man, Kelliher was the perfect example of a “club man” when it came to sailing. He visited regularly to the royal Irish yacht club, to sail and read. Eddie Kelliher died aged 98 on 1 June 2017.
