= Ali Hachicha =

Tunisian judoka

Personal information
- Native name: علي حشيشة
- Nationality: Tunisian
- Born: 5 April 1939 (age 86)
- Height: 175 cm (5 ft 9 in)

Sport
- Country: Tunisia
- Sport: Judo

Ali Hachicha (Arabic: علي حشيشة, born 5 April 1939) is a Tunisian judoka. He competed in the men's open category event at the 1964 Summer Olympics.
