= Yoshihiko Yoshimatsu =

Japanese judoka

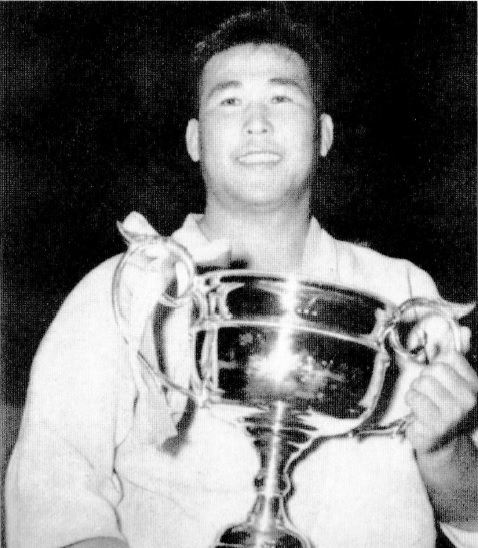
- After winning the All-Japan Championships in 1952

Personal information
- Native name: 吉松 義彦 Yoshimatsu Yoshihiko
- Born: November 16, 1920 Kagoshima Prefecture, Japan
- Died: July 5, 1988 (aged 67) Japan
- Occupation: Judoka

Sport
- Sport: Judo
- Rank: 9th dan black belt
Medal record
Men's judo
Representing Japan
World Championships
Silver medal – second place	1956 Tokyo	Open
All-Japan Championships
Gold medal – first place	1952	Open
Gold medal – first place	1953	Open
Gold medal – first place	1955	Open
Silver medal – second place	1951	Open
Bronze medal – third place	1948	Open

Profile at external databases
- JudoInside.com: 5509

Yoshihiko Yoshimatsu (吉松 義彦, Yoshimatsu Yoshihiko; November 16, 1920 – July 5, 1988) was a Japanese judoka. Born in Kagoshima, Japan, he received a silver medal at the 1956 World Judo Championships in Tokyo, behind winner Shokichi Natsui. He won the All-Japan Judo Championships three times.
