= Alan Petherbridge =

British judoka (1927–2020)

Alan Petherbridge MBE
Personal information
- Full name: David Alan Petherbridge
- Born: 10 September 1927 Swansea, Wales
- Died: 30 July 2020 (aged 92) Sketty, Wales
- Occupation: Judoka
- Height: 180 cm (5 ft 11 in)
- Weight: 110 kg (17 st 5 lb)

Sport
- Sport: Judo
- Rank: 9th dan black belt
- Club: Samurai Judo Club, Swansea
Medal record
Representing United Kingdom
European championships
Gold medal – first place	1962 Essen	Open (3rd dan)

Profile at external databases
- IJF: 54642
- JudoInside.com: 4981

David Alan Petherbridge MBE (10 September 1927 – 30 July 2020) was a British Olympic athlete. He competed in the 1964 Olympic Games in Tokyo.

Petherbridge was appointed a Member of the Order of the British Empire (MBE) in the 1997 Birthday Honours for services to judo. In September 2010 he was inducted to the Welsh Sports Hall of Fame.
