= Anton Geesink =

Dutch judoka (1934–2010)

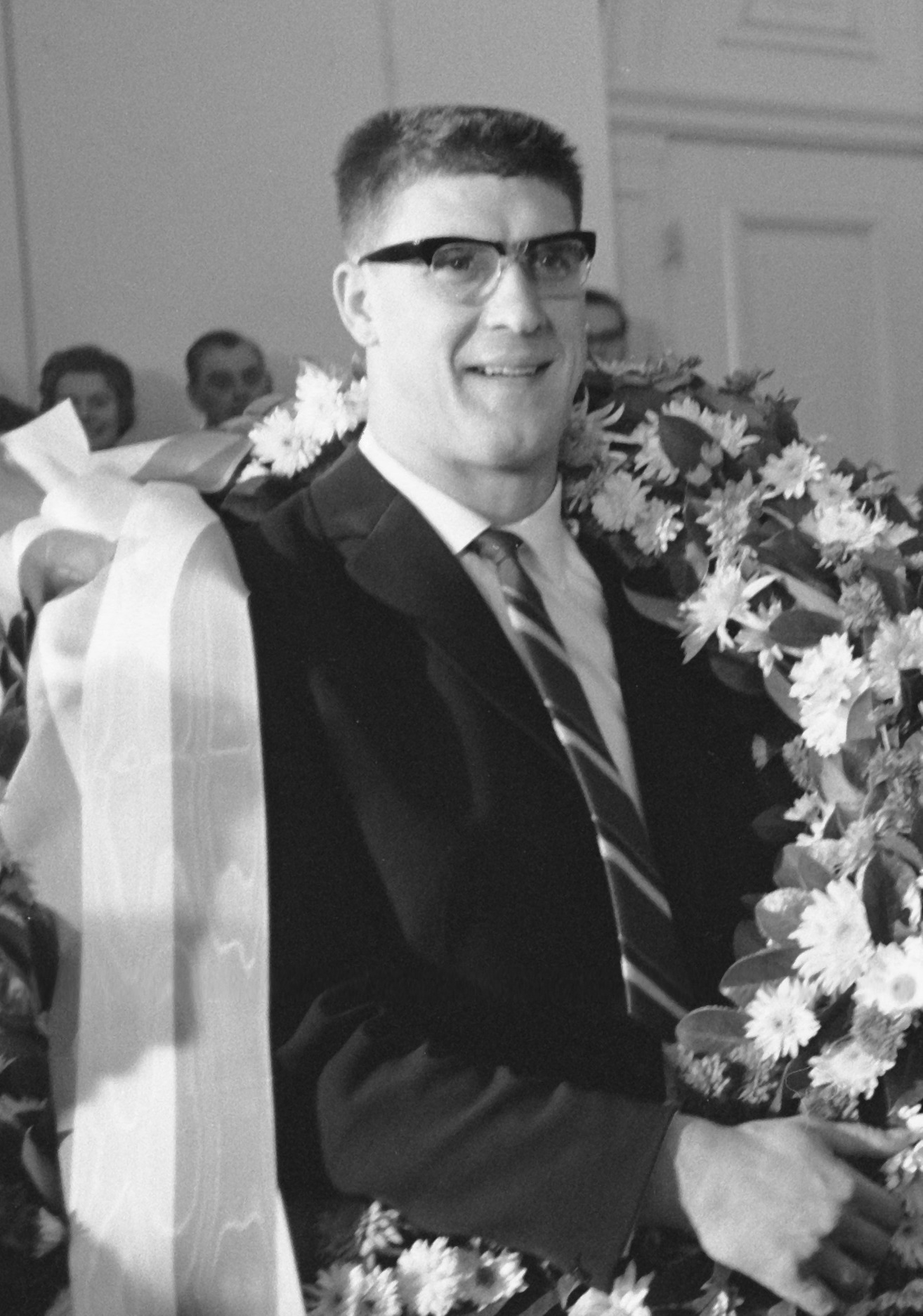
- Geesink in 1961

Personal information
- Full name: Antonius Johannes Geesink
- Born: 6 April 1934 Utrecht, Netherlands
- Died: 27 August 2010 (aged 76) Utrecht, the Netherlands
- Occupation: Judoka
- Height: 1.98 m (6 ft 6 in)
- Weight: 120 kg (265 lb)

Sport
- Country: Netherlands
- Sport: Judo
- Weight class: Open
- Rank: 10th dan black belt
Medal record
Men's judo
Representing the Netherlands
Event	1st	2nd	3rd
Olympic Games	1	0	0
World Championships	2	0	1
European Championships	21	2	2
Total	24	2	3
Olympic Games
Gold medal – first place	1964 Tokyo	Open
World Championships
Gold medal – first place	1961 Paris	Open
Gold medal – first place	1965 Rio de Janeiro	+80 kg
Bronze medal – third place	1956 Tokyo	Open
European Championships
Gold medal – first place	1952 Paris	1st dan
Gold medal – first place	1953 London	Open
Gold medal – first place	1954 Brussels	Open
Gold medal – first place	1955 Paris	3rd dan
Gold medal – first place	1957 Rotterdam	4th dan
Gold medal – first place	1957 Rotterdam	Open
Gold medal – first place	1958 Barcelona	4th dan
Gold medal – first place	1958 Barcelona	Open
Gold medal – first place	1959 Vienna	+80 kg
Gold medal – first place	1959 Vienna	Open
Gold medal – first place	1960 Amsterdam	+80 kg
Gold medal – first place	1960 Amsterdam	Open
Gold medal – first place	1961 Milano	+80 kg
Gold medal – first place	1961 Milano	Open
Gold medal – first place	1962 Essen	+80 kg
Gold medal – first place	1962 Essen	Open
Gold medal – first place	1963 Genève	Open
Gold medal – first place	1963 Genève	+80 kg
Gold medal – first place	1964 Berlin	+80 kg
Gold medal – first place	1964 Berlin	Open
Gold medal – first place	1967 Rome	Open
Silver medal – second place	1951 Paris	1st kyu
Silver medal – second place	1955 Paris	Open
Bronze medal – third place	1965 Madrid	Open
Bronze medal – third place	1965 Madrid	+93 kg

Profile at external databases
- IJF: 54641
- JudoInside.com: 4094
- Updated on 25 June 2023

Antonius Johannes Geesink (6 April 1934 – 27 August 2010) was a Dutch 10th dan judoka. He was the first non-Japanese judoka to win gold at the World Judo Championships, a feat he accomplished in 1961 and 1965. He was also an Olympic Champion, having won gold at the 1964 Summer Olympics in Japan, and won a record 21 European Judo Championships during his career.

== Judo career ==
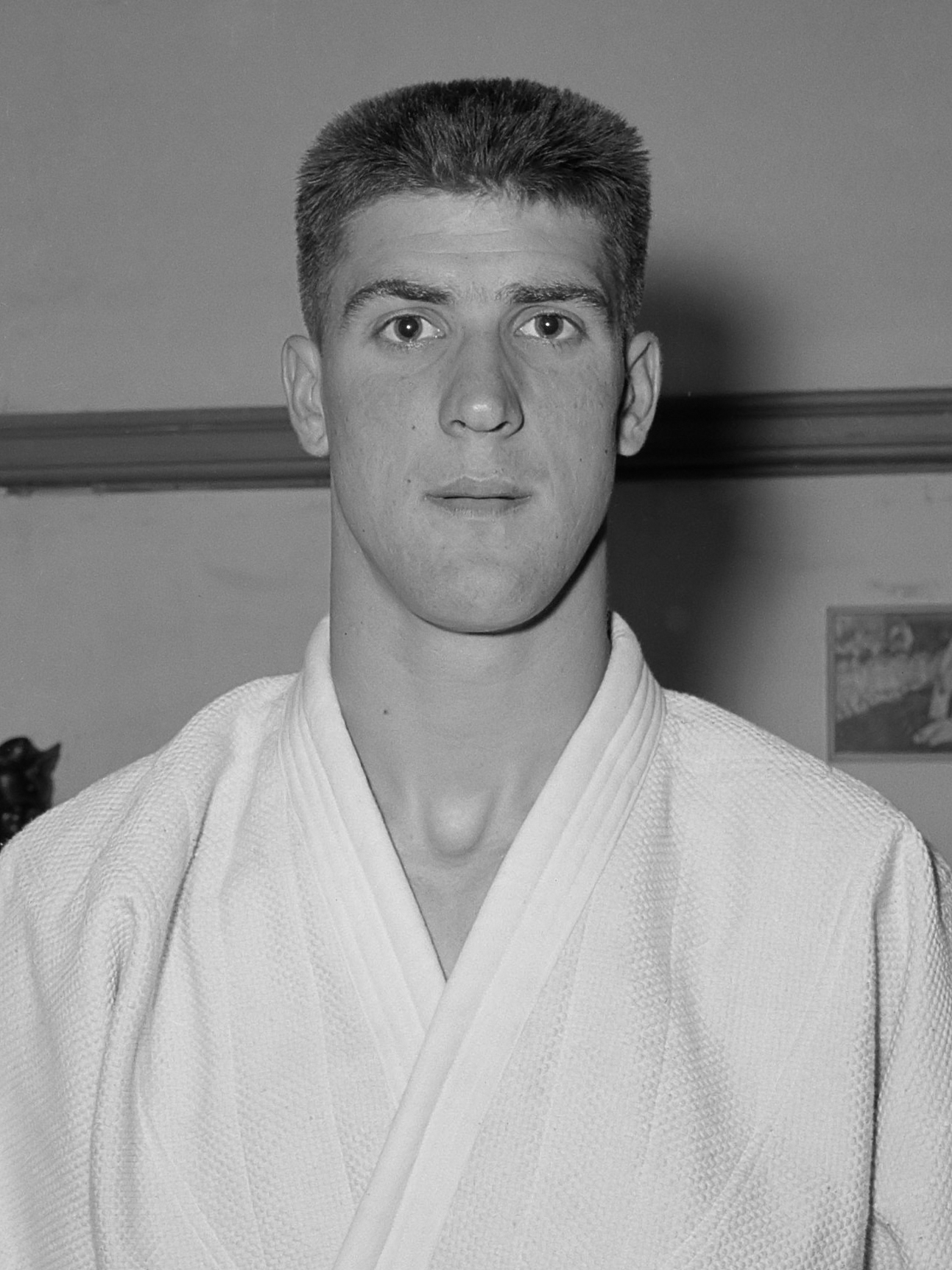
Geesink in 1956

Geesink took up judo at age 14 and, by 17, started competing internationally, winning a silver medal in 1951. He won his first European title the following year. Through to 1967, twenty more European titles followed.

At the 1956 World Championships, Geesink was eliminated in the semi-finals against Yoshihiko Yoshimatsu. At the 1961 World Championships, Geesink, then 5th dan, became World Champion in the open class, defeating the Japanese champion Koji Sone. Japanese judokas had won all the World Championship titles contested up to that point.

Judo debuted as an official sport at the 1964 Summer Olympics, held in the sport's home country, Japan. Although Japan dominated three of the four weight divisions (light, middle, and heavy), Anton Geesink won the final of the open weight division, defeating Akio Kaminaga in front of his home crowd.

After winning the 1965 World Championships and a last European title in 1967, Geesink quit competitive judo.

Anton Geesink was one of the few 10th Dan grade judoka (jūdan) recognized by the IJF but not by the Kodokan Institute at that rank. Promotions from 6th to 10th Dan are awarded for services to the sport of judo. In 2010 there are three living 10th dan grade judoka (jūdan) recognized by Kodokan: Toshiro Daigo, Ichiro Abe and Yoshimi Osawa. The Kodokan has not awarded the 10th Dan to anybody outside Japan.

== Professional wrestling career ==
In October 1973, All Japan Pro Wrestling owner Giant Baba recruited Anton Geesink, sending him to Amarillo, TX, to train under Dory Funk Jr. and Terry Funk for a month. He debuted in Odessa for their promotion, NWA Western States, on October 16th, before touring as a popular part-timer for All Japan from November 24th, 1973, to February 5th, 1978.

Geesink's notable professional wrestling opponents included Bruno Sammartino, Gorilla Monsoon, Killer Kowalski, Dick Beyer, Dick Murdoch, Dory Funk Jr., Harley Race, Bob Backlund, Bobby Duncum, Sgt. Slaughter, The Iron Sheik, Stan Hansen, Don Leo Jonathan, Horst Hoffman, and Jumbo Tsuruta.

== Films and publications ==
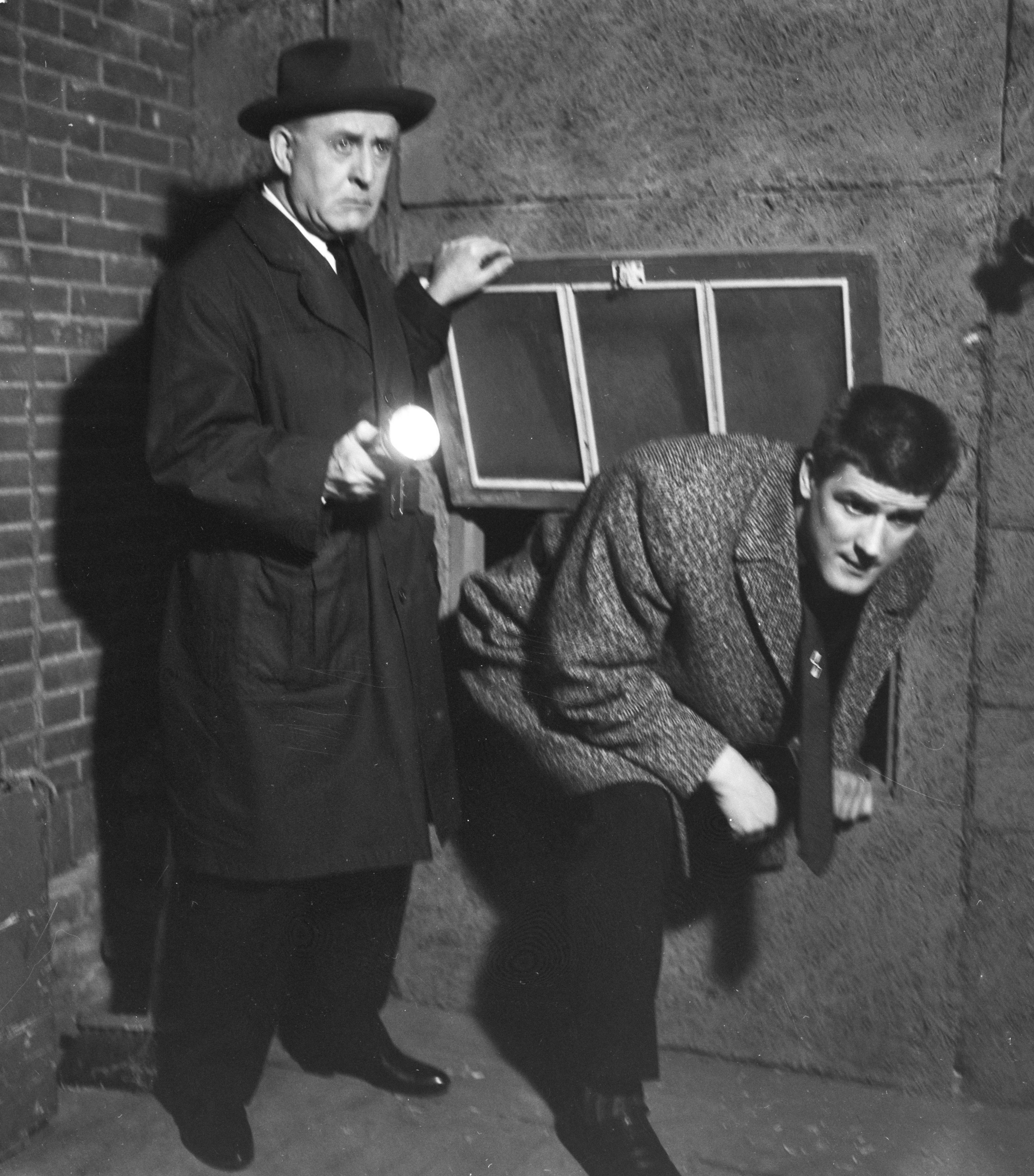
Geesink (right) in Rififi in Amsterdam

Geesink made his acting debut in 1962, playing a detective in the Dutch film Rififi in Amsterdam. In 1965, he starred as Samson in the Italian historical film The Great Leaders, and in the 1960s-1980s, he took part in three Dutch TV series, including the children's show Oebele, where he also sang the song "Judo rock". In the 1960s he published several books on judo in Dutch and English.

== International Olympic Committee work ==
In 1986 during the Maastricht IJF DC meeting Geesink proposed that one player should wear a blue Judogi.

In 1987, Geesink became a member of the board of the Dutch National Olympic Committee, and a member of the International Olympic Committee (IOC).

Geesink was among the IOC members suspected of accepting bribes during the scandal surrounding the election of Salt Lake City as the host of the 2002 Winter Olympics. Geesink's name was cleared by the IOC which nevertheless issued him a warning for the appearance of a conflict of interest which could have damaged the reputation of the IOC. Geesink continued working for IOC until his death in 2010.

== Personal life and death ==
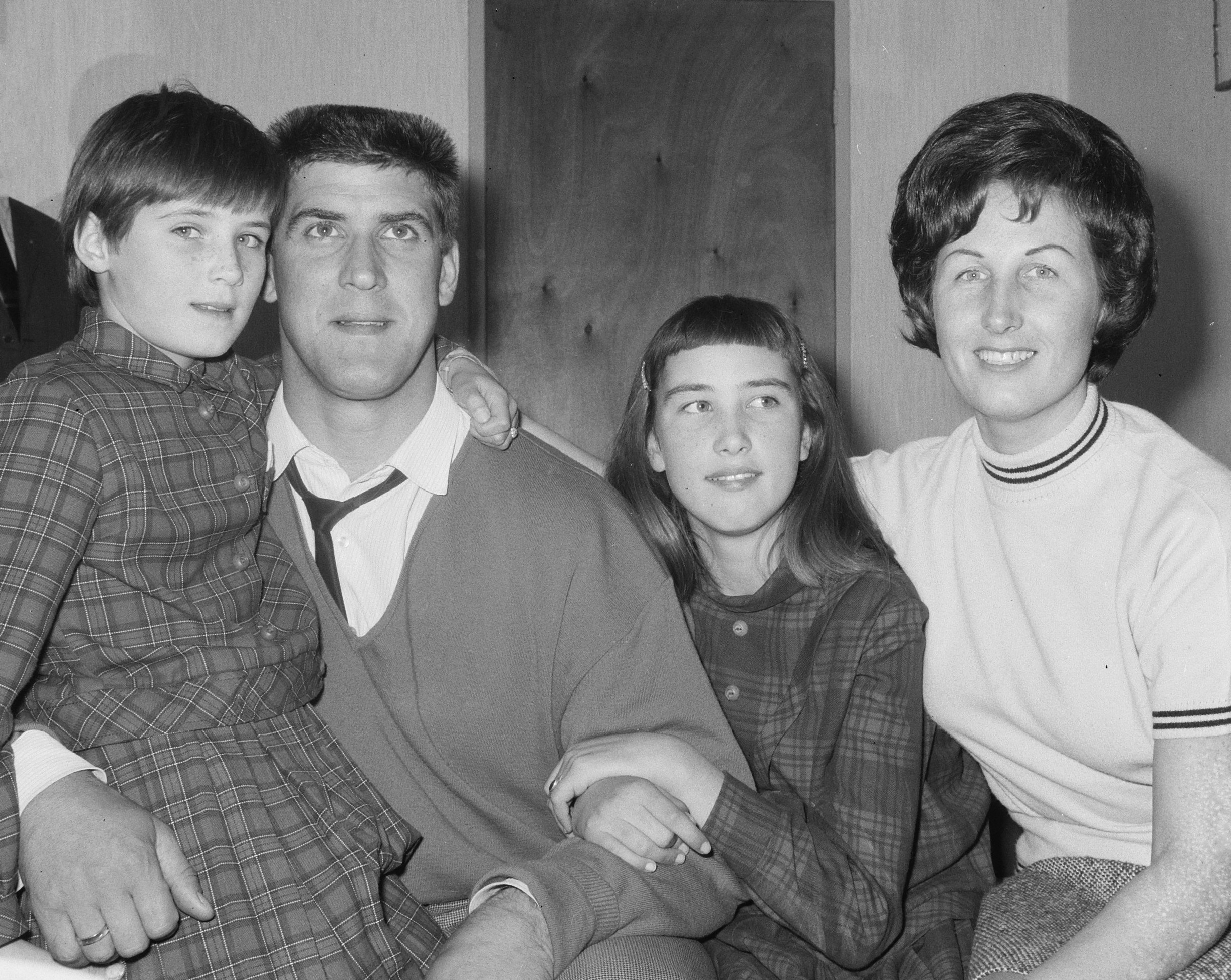
Geesink with wife and children in 1964

Geesink was born and raised in Utrecht. His family was poor and he started work as a builder aged 12. He died in 2010 aged 76 in the town of his birth. He was survived by Jans Geesink, his wife of more than 50 years; his sons Willy and Anton Jr.; and daughter, Leni.

== Honours ==
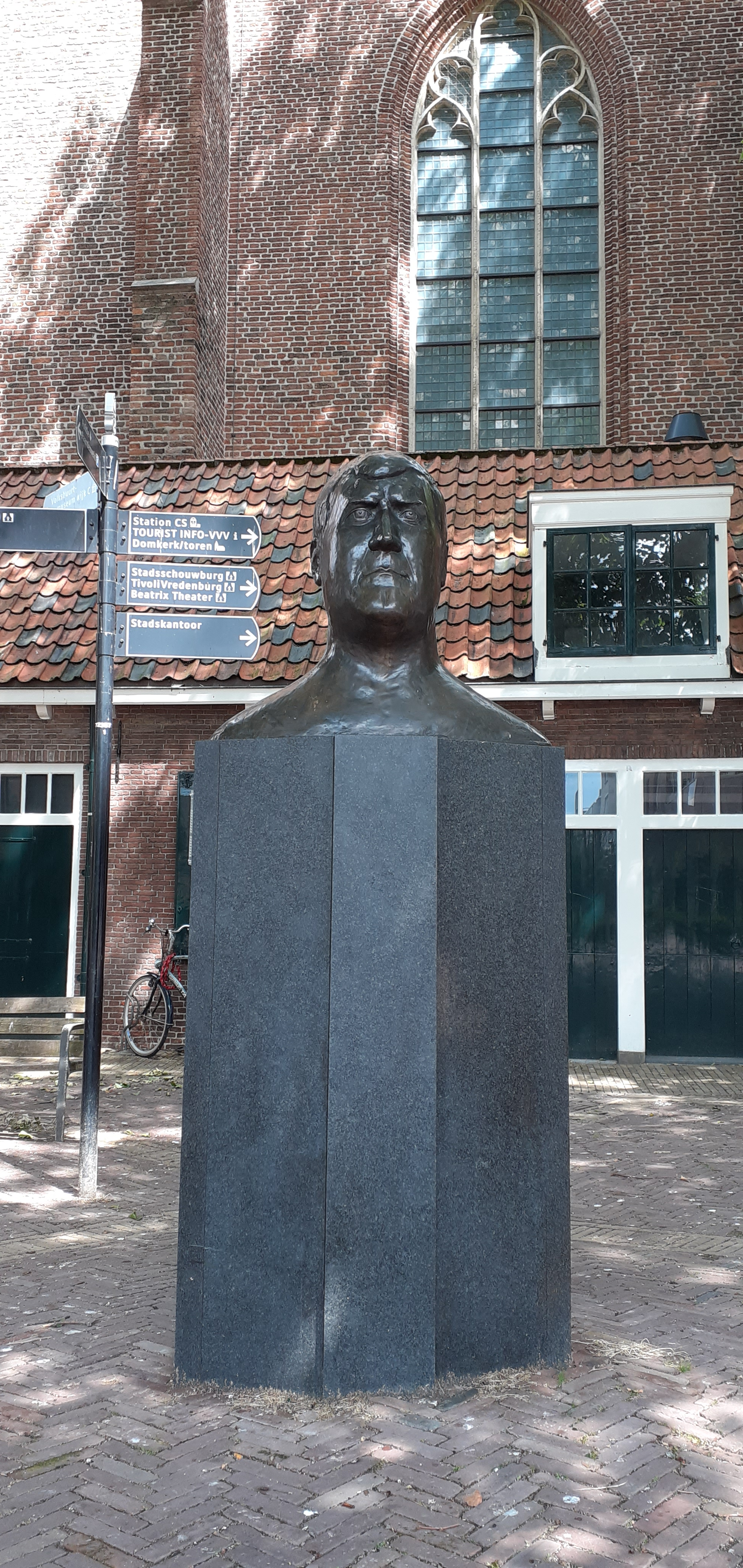
Statue of Anton Geesink in Utrecht (by Theo van de Vathorst, 1995)

Geesink was chosen as the Dutch Sportsman of the Year in 1957, 1961, 1964 and 1965. He was awarded the Order of the Sacred Treasure by the Japanese government in 1997.

His home town of Utrecht has a street named after him — which is the street he lived on for some time up until his death in August 2010. On 29 January 2000, he was awarded an honorary doctorate by Kokushikan University, a Japanese university known for its sport education and of which four alumni are Olympic gold medalists in judo, with the following praise:

ヘーシンク氏は、一九六四年東京オリンピックにおいて、柔道無差別級で外国人選手として初めて金メダルを獲得し、その後、武道精神をもって国際平和に貢献するとともにオランダ・日本両国民の文化交流・友好関係の促進に努め、また柔道を教育学や生体学的角度から研究し、その普及発展のために尽力された。 武道の精神を重視する本大学は、柔道の国際的普及における同氏の功績を讃え、国士舘大学名誉博士の学位を贈呈した。

At the 1964 Tokyo Olympics, Mr. Geesink won the gold medal in the open class as the first non-Japanese. Since then, with the spirit of budō, he has contributed to the international peace and promoted the cultural exchange and friendship between the people of the Netherlands and of Japan. Furthermore, he explored judo in light of education and somatology and has been devoted to its diffusion and development. To honor his contribution to the worldwide diffusion of judo, this university, as a body which prizes the spirit of budō, awarded him an honorary doctorate of Kokushikan University.

Awards
Preceded by Klaas Boot	Dutch Sportsman of the Year; 1957	Succeeded by Gerrit Schulte
Preceded by Peter Post	Dutch Sportsman of the Year; 1964–1965	Succeeded by Ard Schenk / Kees Verkerk
Olympic Games
Preceded by Jan Willem van Erven Dorens	Flagbearer for Netherlands; Tokyo 1964	Succeeded by Fred van Dorp
