= Akio Kaminaga =

Japanese judoka (1936–1993)

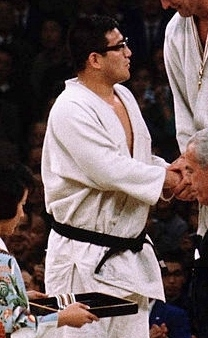
- Akio Kaminaga at the 1964 Olympics

Personal information
- Born: December 22, 1936 Sendai, Miyagi, Japan
- Died: March 21, 1993 (aged 56)
- Occupation: Judoka
- Height: 1.79 m (5 ft 10 in)
- Weight: 102 kg (225 lb)

Sport
- Country: Japan
- Sport: Judo
- Weight class: Open

Achievements and titles
- Olympic Games: (silver) (1964)
- World Champ.: (silver) (1958)
Medal record
Men's judo
Representing Japan
Olympic Games
Silver medal – second place	1964 Tokyo	Open
World Championships
Silver medal – second place	1958 Tokyo	Open

Profile at external databases
- IJF: 54643
- JudoInside.com: 5393
- Updated on June 25, 2023

Akio Kaminaga (神永 昭夫, Kaminaga Akio; December 22, 1936 – March 21, 1993) was a Japanese judoka who won a silver medal in the open weight category at the 1964 Summer Olympics.

== Biography ==
Kaminaga was born in Sendai, Miyagi Prefecture, and began learning judo during high school; a considerably late start for a top competitor. Kaminaga improved his techniques at a quick pace, and took a dan rank exam at the Kodokan Institute at the suggestion of his colleagues during his senior year in high school. Kaminaga defeated 19 straight opponents in the exam, and was awarded a third dan ranking on the spot.

However, Kaminaga was completely outclassed when he participated in the Meiji University judo team's sparring sessions. This convinced him to enter Meiji University, and he continued to practice judo at the Kodokan Institute. Kaminaga had several career choices after graduating, but became an employee of Fuji Steel (currently Nippon Steel) at the recommendation of Meiji University alumnus and 1958 World Judo Championships gold medalist Koji Sone. He finished in second place behind Sone in the 1958 World Championships, and won a then-unprecedented three championships at the All-Japan Judo Championships, in 1960, 1961 and 1964, to become the top heavyweight judo competitor in Japan along with Isao Inokuma. Inokuma would remain Kaminaga's rival and close friend throughout his life.

Judo became an Olympic sport for the first time in the 1964 Summer Olympics held in Tokyo, and Kaminaga entered the competition bearing great expectations as the Japanese representative for the open weight category. However, he sustained a knee ligament injury shortly before the competition, and participated in the tournament hiding this injury. He reached the Olympic finals on October 23, but was defeated by Dutch judoka Anton Geesink, who pinned Kaminaga with a Kesa-Gatame to become the first non-Japanese judoka to win an Olympic gold medal in judo. Japan won all of the gold medals in the judo competition that year excluding Kaminaga's participation in the open weight competition, and the Japanese media criticized Kaminaga for failing to follow suit. Kaminaga retired from competitive judo in 1965 after suffering a detached retina.

Kaminaga became the head coach of the Meiji University judo team in 1968 at the advice of Koji Sone, where he taught future Olympic gold medalist Haruki Uemura. He also served as a coach of the Japanese judo team for the 1972 Summer Olympics, but resigned from his post at Meiji University after one of his pupils, Masatoshi Shinomaki, lost in the preliminary round of the tournament. He lived as a salaryman afterwards, while continuing his affiliation with judo officials. He became the head coach for the Japanese Olympic judo team for the 1992 Summer Olympics, but died a year later in 1993 from colon cancer at age 56.
