= Matthias Schießleder =

German judoka (1936–2024)

Personal information
- Nationality: German
- Born: 23 September 1936; Essen, Gau Essen, Germany
- Died: 13 March 2024 (aged 87)
- Occupation: Judoka

Sport
- Sport: Judo

Profile at external databases
- IJF: 54605
- JudoInside.com: 4859

Matthias Schießleder (23 September 1936 – 13 March 2024) was a German judoka. He competed in the men's lightweight event at the 1964 Summer Olympics.

Schießleder died on 13 March 2024, at the age of 87.
