= 2009 European Team Judo Championships =

Judo competition

2009 Judo European Team Judo Championships
- Venue: Miskolc Sports Hall
- Location: Miskolc, Hungary
- Date: 3 October 2009

Champions
- Men's team: Hungary (1st title)
- Women's team: Russia (2nd title)

Competition at external databases
- Links: EJU • JudoInside

The 2009 European Team Judo Championships were held at the Miskolc Sports Hall in Miskolc, Hungary on 3 October 2009.

== Medal summary ==
Medal summary is as follows:

Event	Gold	Silver	Bronze
Men's team	Hungary	Russia	France
Women's team	Russia	France	Hungary
