= Bernard Pariset =

French judoka (1929–2004)

Personal information
- Born: 21 December 1929
- Died: 26 November 2004 (aged 74)
- Occupation: Judoka

Sport
- Sport: Judo
Medal record
Representing France
Men's judo
World Championships
Bronze medal – third place	1958 Tokyo	Open

Profile at external databases
- JudoInside.com: 5200

Bernard Pariset (December 21, 1929 – November 26, 2004) was a French judoka and jujitsuka who studied with many Japanese masters including Jigoro Kano's student, Mikonosuke Kawaishi, and his assistant, Shozo Awazu. He was one of the few non-Japanese to reach the level of 9th Dan and has been officially recognized by both the French Judo and Ju-Jitsu Federation (FFJDA) and the IFNB (International Federation Nippon Budo). This title is not officially recognized by the Kodokan. Founder of the Atemi Ju-Jitsu system in the late 1940s, he designed the first judo and jujitsu methodologies still in use at the FFJDA. He was also famous for defeating judo heavyweight Anton Geesink.

== Achievements and accolades ==
World Championships
Year	Place	Medal	Category
1958	Tokyo (Japan)	MedalBronze	Open
European Championships
Year	Place	Medal	Category
1951	Paris (France)	MedalGold	1. dan
1952	Paris (France)	MedalSilver	2. dan
1954	Brussels (Belgium)	MedalGold	3. dan
1955	Paris (France)	MedalGold	Open
1957	Rotterdam (Netherlands)	MedalSilver	Open
1958	Barcelona (Spain)	MedalSilver	Abierta
1958	Barcelona (Spain)	MedalSilver	4. dan
1959	Vienna (Austria)	MedalBronze	Open

- First Frenchman, along with Henri Courtine, to participate in the first World Judo Championships in 1956
- Semi-finalist all categories at the 1958 World Judo Championships in Tokyo
- Former French Judo Champion all categories in 1955, 1957 and 1959
- Former European Judo Champion all categories in 1951 and 1954
- Former Coach of the French Olympic Judo and Ju-Jitsu Team
- Former National Technical Advisor for Judo and Ju-Jitsu at the French National Judo and Ju-Jitsu Federation (FFJDA)
- Former Captain of the French National Judo and Ju-Jitsu Team

== Bibliography ==
- 'Judo : progression officielle française' by Bernard Pariset, published in 1969 and 1984 in French
- 'Judo - Formes de projections, Nage No Kata' by Bernard Pariset, published in 1970 in French
- 'Jiu-Jitsu moderne par l'image : self-défense judo d'après la progression officielle française' by Bernard Pariset, published in 1972 in French
- 'Nage no Kata; formes de projections' by Bernard Pariset, published in 1970 in French
- 'Atemi Ju-Jitsu moderne : self défense - progression officielle française' par ceintures by Bernard Pariset, published in 1982 in French
- 'Atemi Ju-Jitsu : les 16 techniques et le Goshin-Jitsu' by Bernard Pariset, published in 1991 in French
