= Mikinosuke Kawaishi =

Japanese judoka (1899–1969)

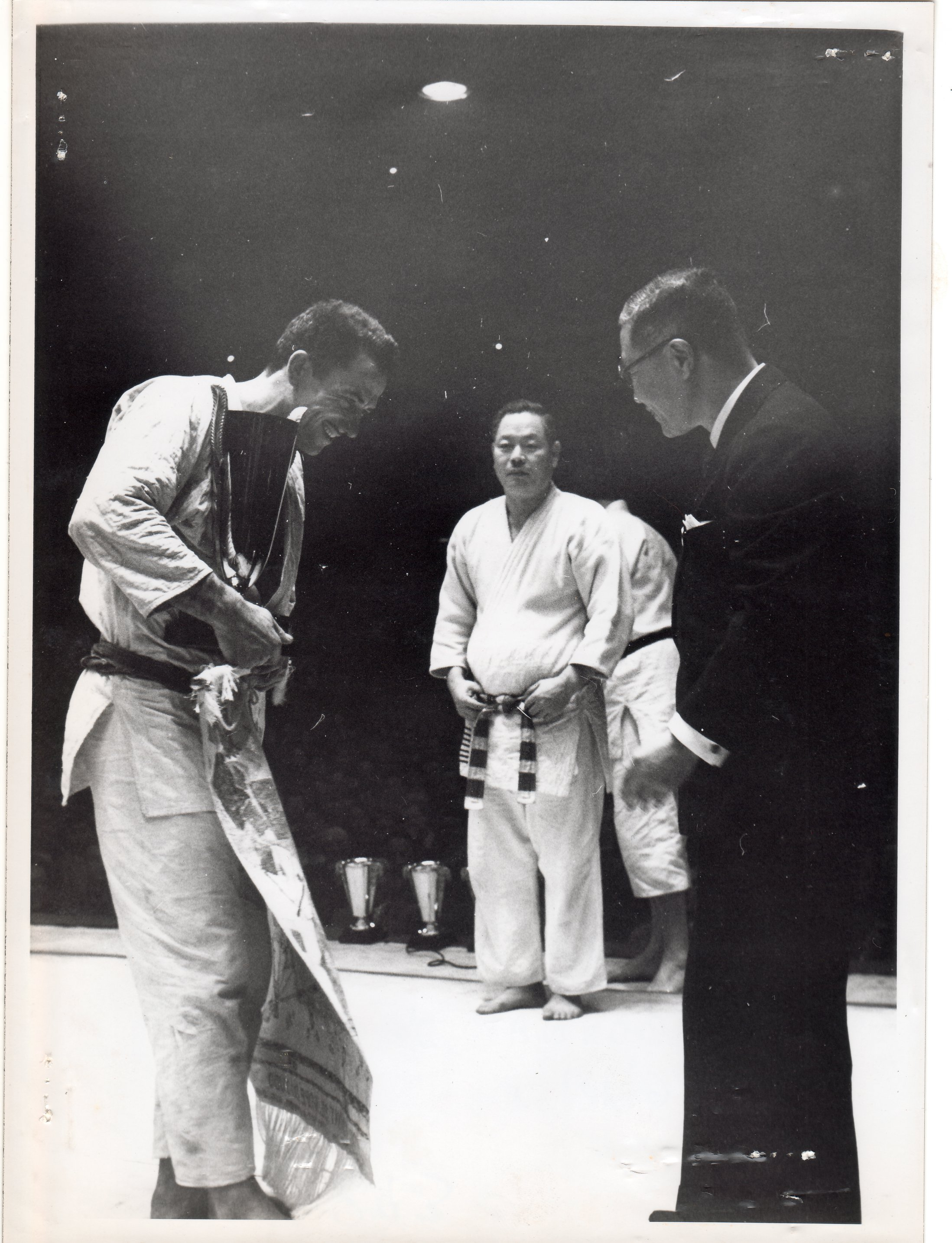
Kawaishi (center).

Mikinosuke Kawaishi (川石 酒造之助, Kawaishi Mikinosuke; born 13 August 1899 – 30 January 1969) was a Japanese master of judo who achieved the rank of 7th Dan. He led the development of Judo in France, with Shozo Awazu, and much of Europe.

He is credited with introducing the colored belt system for differentiating early grades. However, written accounts from the archives of London's Budokwai judo club, founded in 1918, record the use of colored judo belts at the 1926 9th annual Budokwai Display, and a list of ranked colored judokas appears in the Budokwai Committee Minutes of June 1927. Kawaishi visited London and the Budokwai in 1928, and was probably inspired to bring the colored belt system to France. The Fédération Française posthumously awarded him 10th Dan in judo and jujutsu.

== Name ==
Mikinosuke is often erroneously transcribed, particularly in France, as Mikonosuke.

== Biography ==
Kawaishi was born in Himeji in 1899 and having studied judo in Kyoto at the Dai Nippon Butokukai (Greater Japan Association of Martial Virtue). He left Japan in the mid-1920s to travel and see the world and began by touring the United States of America, teaching jujitsu particularly in New York City and San Diego. By 1928 he had arrived in the United Kingdom and soon established a school in Liverpool and with his close friend Gunji Koizumi. Koizumi was nearly 10 years his senior and was well established in the UK having formed the London Budokwai Club and a school at Oxford University. In 1931, he moved to London where he founded the Anglo-Japanese Judo Club and also began teaching judo at Oxford University with Koizumi.

With the Asian martial arts still relatively new to England, he was forced to supplement his meager earnings as a teacher by becoming a professional wrestler with the stage name of "Matsuda". In that latter part of 1931 he returned to Japan for a short time, and it was during this trip that he renewed his association with Jigoro Kano, who awarded him with a third Dan in Kodokan Judo. In 1935, then a Kano fourth Dan, Kawaishi moved to Paris where he was commissioned to teach jujutsu to the French Police. It was at this time, that he opened the first public school of jujutsu in the Latin Quarters of Paris.

Attempting to return to Japan as World War II loomed, Kawaishi was imprisoned in Manchuria. Following the end of the war and his subsequent release, he returned to Paris to continue with his teaching.

In 1947 Kawaishi joined forces with Koizumi to promote the first ever-recorded Judo International tournament between two countries (UK and France). This became known as the Kawaishi Cup, with the medal bearing his name being awarded to the division winners only. With Moshé Feldenkrais he founded the French Judo Federation in the 1946, becoming the technical director for many years.

== Death ==
Kawaishi died on the January 30, 1969, and his body was laid to rest in Plessis-Robinson, Paris.

== Bibliography ==
- Michel Brousse, Les racines du judo français. Histoire d'une culture sportive, Presses Universitaires de Bordeaux, n° 401, 2005 — ISBN 2-867-81368-9
- Beginning Jiu-jitsu: Ryoi Shinto Style, James G Shortt and Katsuharu Hashimoto, 1979.
- My Method of Judo, Mikinosuke Kawaishi
- My Method of Self Defence, Mikinosuke Kawaishi
- The Seven Katas of Judo, Mikinosuke Kawaishi
- Standing Judo: The Combinations and Counter-attacks, Mikinosuke Kawaishi, 1963.
- 'Judo in France' by Henry Plée, in A Complete Guide to Judo: Its Story and Practice, ed. Robert W. Smith.
- Martial Arts: History, Tradition and People, John Corcoran and Emil Farkas.
- The Founding of Jujutsu & Judo In America, George Rego, 2022.
