= Henri Courtine =

French judoka (1930–2021)

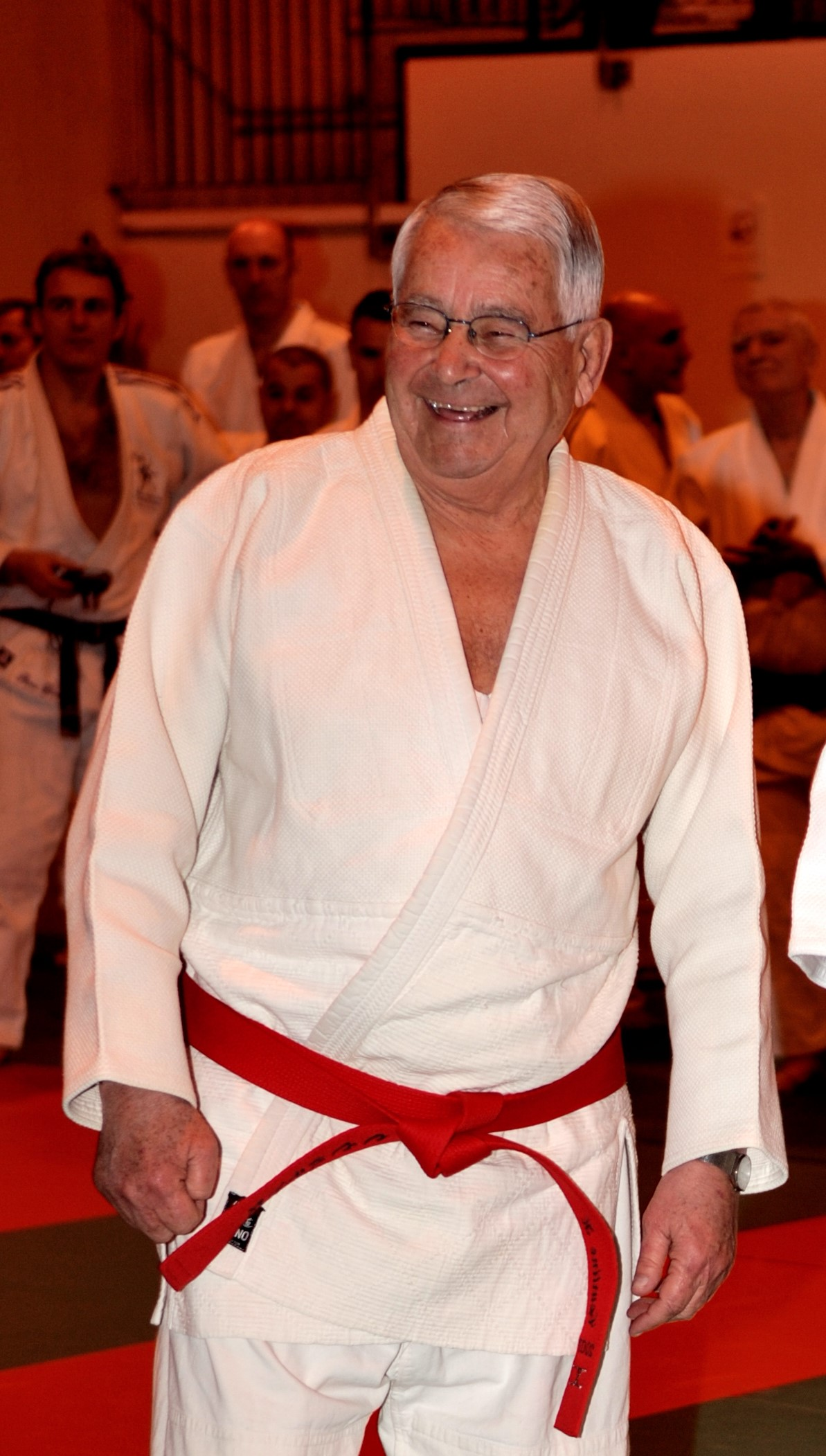
- Courtine in 2008

Personal information
- Born: 11 May 1930 Paris, France
- Died: 20 February 2021 (aged 90)

Sport
- Sport: Judo
- Division(s): half-lightweight (60–66 kg)
Medal record
Men's Judo
Representing France
World Championships
Bronze medal – third place	1956 Tokyo	Open
European Championships
Gold medal – first place	1962 Essen	-60 kg
- Updated on 11 February 2014

Henri Courtine (11 May 1930 – 20 February 2021) was a French judoka.

== Career ==
He studied with Mikinosuke Kawaishi, and his assistant, Shozo Awazu. He received a bronze medal at the 1956 World Judo Championships in Tokyo, shared with Anton Geesink, after losing the semi-final to winner Shokichi Natsui. He was three times individual European champion (1952, 1958 and 1959), and four times with the French team (1952, 1954, 1955 and 1956). He served as sports director of the International Judo Federation (IJF) from 1979 to 1987.

Henri Courtine was honored with the title jūdan (10th dan) in 2007, as the first ever French judoka. This title however is not officially recognized by the Kodokan.

Courtine died on 20 February 2021, aged 90.
