= European Judo Championships =

Recurring sporting event

- Current event or competition: 2026 European Judo Championships

Competition details
- Discipline: Judo
- Type: Annual
- Organiser: European Judo Union (EJU)

History
- First edition: 1951 in Paris, France
- Editions: 75M / 52W (2026)
- Most recent: Tbilisi 2026
- Next edition: Apeldoorn 2027

The European Judo Championships is the Judo European Championship organized by the European Judo Union. The 2015 and 2019 editions were held during the respective European Games. This is also expected for future editions of the European Games.

== Senior Editions ==
=== Men's Competitions ===
Year	Edition	Dates	Host	Events	Ref.
1951	1	5–6 December	Paris, France	6	
1952	2	9–12 December	Paris, France	7	
1953	3	29–30 October	London, United Kingdom	2	
1954	4	10–11 December	Brussels, Belgium	5	
1955	5	4 December	Paris, France	6	
1957	6	10 November	Rotterdam, Netherlands	9	
1958	7	10–11 May	Barcelona, Spain	9	
1959	8	9 May	Vienna, Austria	9	
1960	9	13–15 May	Amsterdam, Netherlands	9	
1961	10	13 May	Milan, Italy	9	
1962	11	12–14 May	Essen, West Germany	13	
1963	12	11 May	Geneva, Switzerland	9	
1964	13	25–26 April	East Berlin, East Germany	12	
1965	14	23–24 April	Madrid, Spain	13	
1966	15	6–7 May	Luxembourg, Luxembourg	7	
1967	16	11–13 May	Rome, Italy	7	
1968	17	17–19 May	Lausanne, Switzerland	7	
1969	18	15–18 May	Ostend, Belgium	7	
1970	19	21–24 May	East Berlin, East Germany	7	
1971	20	22–23 May	Gothenburg, Sweden	7	
1972	21	12–14 May	Voorburg, Netherlands	7	
1973	22	12–13 May	Madrid, Spain	7	

=== Men's and Women's Competitions ===
Men's Competitions
Year	Edition	Dates	Host	Events	Ref.
1974	23	2–5 May	London, United Kingdom	7	
1975	24	8–11 May	Lyon, France	7	
1976	25	6–9 May	Kyiv, Soviet Union	7	
1977	26	13–15 May	Ludwigshafen, West Germany	9	
1978	27	5–7 May	Helsinki, Finland	8	
1979	28	24–27 May	Brussels, Belgium	8	
1980	29	15–18 May	Vienna, Austria	8	
1981	30	14–17 May	Debrecen, Hungary	8	
1982	31	13–16 May	Rostock, East Germany	8	
1983	32	12–15 May	Paris, France	8	
1984	33	3–6 May	Liège, Belgium	8	
1985	34	9–12 May	Hamar, Norway	8	
1986	35	8–11 May	(Socialist Federal Republic of Yugoslavia) Belgrade, Yugoslavia	8	

Women's Competitions
Year	Edition	Dates	Host	Events	Ref.
1974	0	30 Nov–1 Dec	Genoa, Italy	8	
1975	1	12–13 December	Munich, West Germany	8	
1976	2	9–12 December	Vienna, Austria	8	
1977	3	1–2 October	Arlon, Belgium	8	
1978	4	11 November	Cologne, West Germany	8	
1979	5	5–6 April	Kerkrade, Netherlands	8	
1980	6	15–16 March	Udine, Italy	8	
1981	7	27–29 March	Madrid, Spain	8	
1982	8	13–14 March	Oslo, Norway	8	
1983	9	5–6 March	Genoa, Italy	8	
1984	10	17–18 March	Pirmasens, West Germany	8	
1985	11	15–17 March	Landskrona, Sweden	8	
1986	12	15–16 March	London, United Kingdom	8	

=== Combined Competitions ===
Year	Edition M	Edition W	Dates	Host	Events	Ref.
1987	36	13	7–10 May	Paris, France	16	
1988	37	14	19–22 May	Pamplona, Spain	16	
1989	38	15	11–14 May	Helsinki, Finland	16	
1990	39	16	10–13 May	Frankfurt, Germany	16	
1991	40	17	16–19 May	Prague, Czechoslovakia	16	
1992	41	18	4–7 May	Paris, France	16	
1993	42	19	1–2 May	Athens, Greece	16	
1994	43	20	19–22 May	Gdańsk, Poland	16	
1995	44	21	11–14 May	Birmingham, United Kingdom	16	
1996	45	22	16–19 May	The Hague, Netherlands	16	
1997	46	23	8–11 May	Ostend, Belgium	16	
1998	47	24	14–17 May	Oviedo, Spain	16	
1999	48	25	20–23 May	Bratislava, Slovakia	16	
2000	49	26	18–21 May	Wrocław, Poland	16	
2001	50	27	18–20 May	Paris, France	16	
2002	51	28	16–18 May	Maribor, Slovenia	16	
2003	52	29	16–18 May	Düsseldorf, Germany	16	
2004	53	30	14–16 May	Bucharest, Romania	14	
2005	54	31	20–22 May	Rotterdam, Netherlands	14	
2006	55	32	26–28 May	Tampere, Finland	14	
2007	56	33	6–8 April	Belgrade, Serbia	14	
2008	57	34	11–13 April	Lisbon, Portugal	14	
2009	58	35	24–26 April	(Georgia (country)) Tbilisi, Georgia	14	
2010	59	36	22–25 April	Vienna, Austria	16	
2011	60	37	21–24 April	Istanbul, Turkey	16	
2012	61	38	26–29 April	Chelyabinsk, Russia	16	
2013	62	39	25–28 April	Budapest, Hungary	16	
2014	63	40	24–27 April	Montpellier, France	16	
2015	64	41	25–28 June	Baku, Azerbaijan	18	
2016	65	42	21–24 April	Kazan, Russia	16	
2017	66	43	20–23 April	Warsaw, Poland	16	
2018	67	44	26–28 April	Tel Aviv, Israel	14	
2019	68	45	22–25 June	Minsk, Belarus	15	
2020	69	46	19–21 November	Prague, Czech Republic	14	
2021	70	47	16–18 April	Lisbon, Portugal	14	
2022	71	48	29 April–1 May	Sofia, Bulgaria	14	
2023	72	49	3–5 November	Montpellier, France	14	
2024	73	50	25–28 April	Zagreb, Croatia	15	
2025	74	51	23–27 April	Podgorica, Montenegro	15	
2026	75	52	16–19 April	(Georgia (country)) Tbilisi, Georgia	14	
2027	76	53	15–18 April	Apeldoorn, Netherlands	14	

=== Openweight ===
Year	Edition	Dates	Host	Events	Ref.
2004	1	4 December	Budapest, Hungary	2	
2005	2	3 December	Moscow, Russia	2	
2006	3	9 December	Novi Sad, Serbia	2	
2007	4	1 December	Warsaw, Poland	2	

=== Open ===
Year	Edition	Dates	Host	Events	Ref.
2023	1	16 December	Pristina, Kosovo	2	

=== Team ===
Year	Competitions		Dates	Host	Ref.
Men's Competitions
1973	M	—	10–13 May	Madrid, Spain	
1974	M	—	2–5 May	(United Kingdom) London, Great Britain	
1975	M	—	11 May	Lyon, France	
1976	M	—	9 May	Kyiv, Soviet Union	
1977	M	—	11–15 May	Ludwigshafen, West Germany	
1978	M	—	21–22 October	Paris, France	
1979	M	—	20 October	Brescia, Italy	
1980	M	—	25 October	The Hague, Netherlands	
1982	M	—	2–3 October	Milan, Italy	
1984	M	—	27–28 October	Paris, France	
Separated Men's and Women's Competitions
1985	M	W	9–10 November	Brussels, Belgium	
1986	M	W	4–5 October	(Socialist Federal Republic of Yugoslavia) Novi Sad, Yugoslavia	
1987	M	W	9–11 October	Paris, France	
1988	M	W	29–30 October	Visé, Belgium	
1989	M	W	28–29 October	Vienna, Austria	
1990	M	W	27–28 October	(Socialist Federal Republic of Yugoslavia) Dubrovnik, Yugoslavia	
1991	M	W	26–27 October	's-Hertogenbosch, Netherlands	
1992	M	W	24–25 October	Leonding, Austria	
1993	M	W	23–24 October	Frankfurt, Germany	
1994	M	W	22–23 October	The Hague, Netherlands	
1995	M	W	14–15 October	Trnava, Slovakia	
1996	M	W	19–20 October	Saint Petersburg, Russia	
1997	M	W	25–26 October	Rome, Italy	
1998	M	W	17–18 October	Villach, Austria	
1999	M	W	23–24 October	Istanbul, Turkey	
2000	M	W	18–19 October	Aalst, Belgium	
2001	M	W	29 Sep, 20–21 Oct, 15–16 Dec	Madrid, Spain	
2002	M	W	19 October	Maribor, Slovenia	
2003	M	W	19 May	Düsseldorf, Germany	
2003	—	W	25 October	Oradea, Romania	
2003	M	—	6 December	(United Kingdom) London, Great Britain	
2004	M	W	24 October	Paris, France	
2005	M	W	22–23 October	Debrecen, Hungary	
2006	M	W	28 October	Belgrade, Serbia	
2007	M	W	27 October	Minsk, Belarus	
2008	M	W	25 October	Moscow, Russia	
2009	M	W	3 October	Miskolc, Hungary	
2010	M	W	25 April	Vienna, Austria	
2011	M	W	24 April	Istanbul, Turkey	
2012	M	W	29 April	Chelyabinsk, Russia	
2013	M	W	28 April	Budapest, Hungary	
2014	M	W	27 April	Montpellier, France	
2015	M	W	28 June	Baku, Azerbaijan	
2016	M	W	24 April	Kazan, Russia	
2017	M	W	23 April	Warsaw, Poland	

==== Mixed Team ====
Year	Competition	Dates	Host	Countries	Gold	Silver	Bronze		Ref.
2018	Mixed	18 July	Yekaterinburg, Russia	21	Germany	Netherlands	Russia	Ukraine	
2019	Mixed	25 June	Minsk, Belarus	16	Russia	Portugal	France	Austria	
2021	Mixed	27 November	Ufa, Russia	16	Georgia	Netherlands	Russia	Turkey	
2022	Mixed	12 November	Mulhouse, France	14	France	Netherlands	Germany	Turkey	
2023	Mixed	1 July	Kraków, Poland	22	Georgia	Germany	Netherlands	Italy	
2024	Mixed	28 April	Zagreb, Croatia	11	France	Georgia	Germany	Serbia	
2025	Mixed	27 April	Podgorica, Montenegro	15	Georgia	Italy	Germany	IJF	
2026	Mixed	7 November	Belgrade, Serbia	13	Russia	Georgia	France	Turkey	
2027	Mixed		(Turkey) Istanbul						

European Games

== Youth Championship ==
Judo European Youth Championship organized by the European Judo Union.

Event	First
European U23 Judo Championships	2003
European Junior Judo Championships (U21)	1960
European Cadet Judo Championships (U18)	2000

== Veterans Championship ==
European Veterans Judo Championships organized by the European Judo Union since 2009.

Year	Edition	Dates	Host	Ref
2009	1	12–14 November	Lignano, Italy	
2010	2	7–10 October	Poreč, Croatia	
2011	3	10–13 November	Leibnitz, Austria	
2012	4	10–13 May	Opole, Poland	
2013	5	13–16 June	Paris, France	
2014	6	26–29 June	Prague, Czech Republic	
2015	7	28–31 May	Balatonfüred, Hungary	
2016	8	23–26 June	Poreč, Croatia	
2017	9	15–18 June	Zagreb, Croatia	
2018	10	14–17 June	Glasgow, United Kingdom	
2019	11	25–28 July	Las Palmas de Gran Canaria, Spain	
2022	12	2–5 June	Heraklion, Greece	
2023	13	8–10 June	Podcetrtek, Slovenia	
2024	14	6–9 June	(Bosnia and Herzegovina) Sarajevo, Bosnia	

- Not held in 2020 and 2021.

== Kata Championship ==
1. 2008 European Kata Judo Championships
2. 2009 European Kata Judo Championships - Not held
3. 2010 European Kata Judo Championships
4. 2011 European Kata Judo Championships
5. 2012 European Kata Judo Championships
6. 2013 European Kata Judo Championships
7. 2014 European Kata Judo Championships
8. 2015 European Kata Judo Championships
9. 2016 European Kata Judo Championships
10. 2017 European Kata Judo Championships
11. 2018 European Kata Judo Championships
12. 2019 European Kata Judo Championships
13. 2020 European Kata Judo Championships
14. 2021 European Kata Judo Championships
15. 2022 European Kata Judo Championships
16. 2023 European Kata Judo Championships
17. 2024 European Kata Judo Championships

Others:

== All-time medal table (1951 - 2026) ==
This table include all medals in the individual and team competitions won at the European Judo Championships as well as at the separate European Judo Team Championships and separate European Judo Open Championships.

Updated after 2025 European Judo Championships.

Rank	Nation	Gold	Silver	Bronze	Total
1	France	251	173	265	689
2	Netherlands	106	88	168	362
3	Germany	96	115	281	492
4	Soviet Union	91	61	70	222
5	Russia	71	66	98	235
6	Great Britain	55	76	131	262
7	Georgia	49	44	57	150
8	Belgium	48	40	100	188
9	Italy	31	61	109	201
10	Spain	28	38	83	149
11	Austria	26	36	76	138
12	Poland	21	34	83	138
13	Hungary	21	31	59	111
14	Romania	19	14	35	68
15	Ukraine	17	11	37	65
16	Azerbaijan	15	16	27	58
17	Portugal	12	11	22	45
18	Turkey	12	5	36	53
19	Israel	11	16	34	61
20	Slovenia	11	11	33	55
21	Kosovo	11	4	14	29
22	Belarus	7	10	28	45
23	Individual Neutral Athletes	7	5	6	18
24	Switzerland	5	8	25	38
25	Finland	4	6	7	17
26	Czech Republic	4	2	6	12
27	Estonia	3	4	12	19
28	Czechoslovakia	2	9	25	36
29	Serbia	2	7	6	15
30	Sweden	2	6	21	29
31	Greece	2	4	7	13
31	Moldova	2	4	7	13
33	Armenia	2	3	4	9
34	CIS	2	2	5	9
35	Albania	2	2	3	7
36	Bulgaria	1	10	20	31
37	Yugoslavia	1	6	19	26
38	Bosnia and Herzegovina	1	3	2	6
39	Croatia	1	1	11	13
40	England	1	0	0	1
41	Latvia	0	3	7	10
42	Slovakia	0	3	4	7
43	Mongolia	0	2	0	2
44	Denmark	0	1	9	10
45	Lithuania	0	1	5	6
46	Cyprus	0	0	3	3
47	Brazil	0	0	1	1
47	Ireland	0	0	1	1
Totals (48 entries)		1,053	1,053	2,062	4,168

== See also ==
- IBSA European Judo Championships (Blind)
- 2021 European Kata Judo Championships
