= Nicola Tempesta =

Italian judoka (1935–2021)

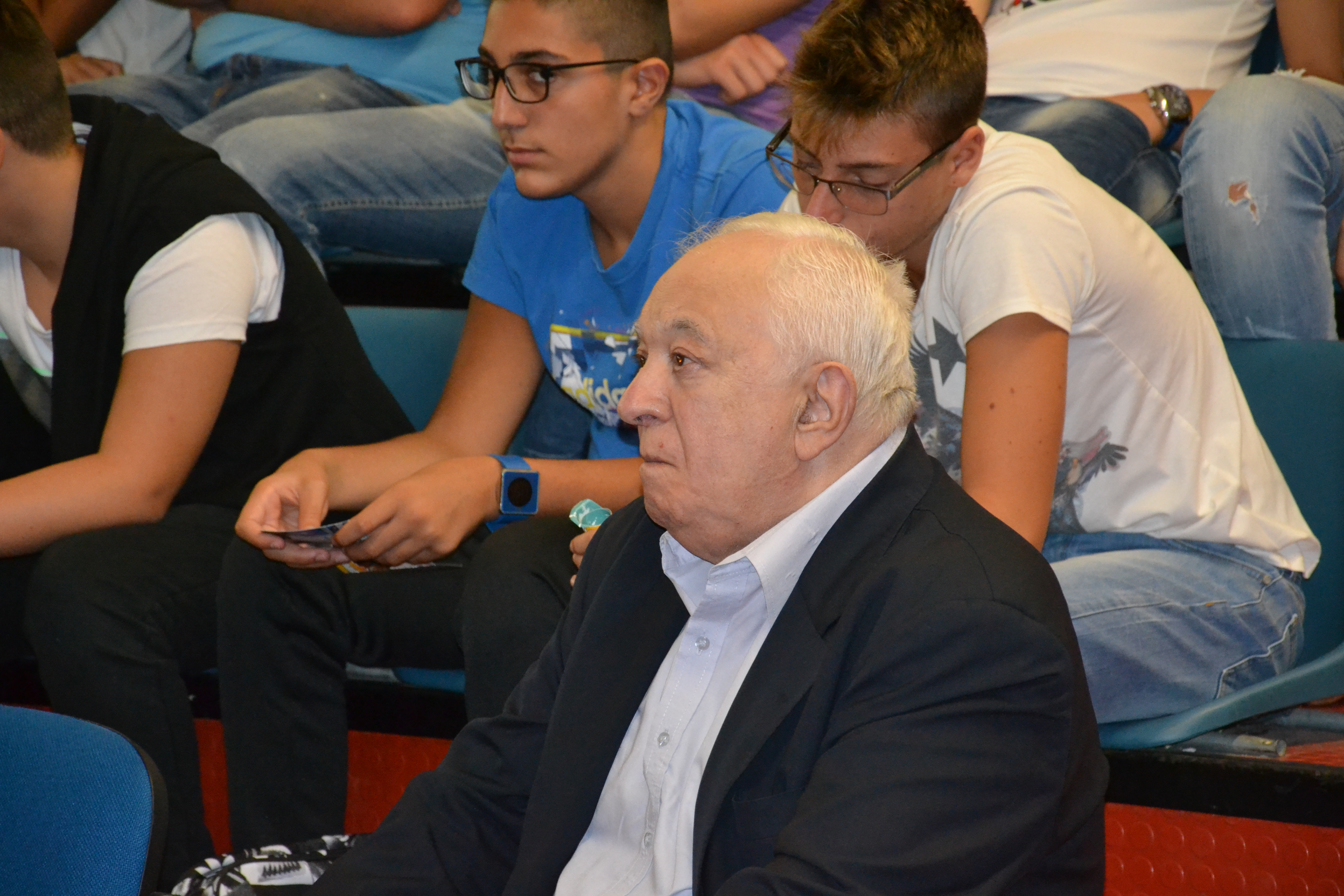

Personal information
- Nationality: Italian
- Born: 28 June 1935 Naples, Italy
- Died: 20 February 2021 (aged 85) Naples, Italy
- Occupation: Judoka
- Height: 1.81 m (5 ft 11 in)
- Weight: 108 kg (238 lb)

Sport
- Sport: Judo
- Club: Associazione Polisportiva Partenope, Napoli

Profile at external databases
- JudoInside.com: 5342

Nicola Tempesta (28 June 1935 – 20 February 2021) was an Italian judoka who competed at the 1964 and 1972 Olympics. He finished in sixth place in 1964 and was disqualified in 1972. Tempesta won more than 10 European medals, including two gold – in 1957 and 1961.

== Achievements ==
Year	Tournament	Place	Weight class
1954	Brussels (Belgium)	3rd	Open
1957	Rotterdam (Netherlands)	1st	80 kg
1959	Vienna (Austria)	2nd	Open
1960	Amsterdam (Netherlands)	2nd	80 kg
1960	Amsterdam (Netherlands)	2nd	80 kg
1960	Amsterdam (Netherlands)	3rd	80 kg
1961	Milan (Italy)	1st	-
1962	Essen (West Germany)	2nd	-
1963	Geneva (Switzerland)	2nd	Open(Amateur)
