= Boxing at the 1964 Summer Olympics – Flyweight =

Boxing competitions

The flyweight class was the lightest class in the boxing at the 1964 Summer Olympics competition. Flyweights were limited to those boxers weighing less than 51 kilograms. The competition was held from October 12, 1964, to October 23, 1964. 28 boxers from 28 nations competed.

After one minute and six seconds of the first round of his quarterfinal bout against Stanislav Sorokin, Choh Dong-Kih was disqualified for holding his head too low. Unable to accept the verdict, Dong sat in the middle of the ring for 51 minutes, until officials persuaded him to leave.

== Medalists ==
| Gold | Silver | Bronze |
|---|---|---|
| Fernando Atzori (ITA) | Artur Olech (POL) | Robert Carmody (USA) Stanislav Sorokin (URS) |

== Results ==
Round of 32; October 12
Rafael Carbonell (CUB) | 0
Sean McCafferty (IRL) | 5
Jumaat Ibrahim (MAS) | L
Sulley Shittu (GHA) | KO
Fernando Atzori (ITA) | 5
Mahmoud Mersal (EGY) | 0
Luis Romo (ARG) | L
Darryl Norwood (AUS) | KO
Veerapan Komolsen (THA) | 1
John McCluskey (GBR) | 4
Bawa Maung (BIR) | DQ
Stanislav Sorokin (URS) | W
Nasser Aghaei (IRI) | DQ
Jo Dong-gi (KOR) | W
Dominador Calumarde (PHI) | KO
Wang Chee-yen (ROC) | L
Walter Henry (CAN) | RSC
Constantin Ciucă (ROU) | W
Winston Van Cuylenburg (CEY) | W
Lee Kam Wah (HKG) | RSC
John Kamau (KEN) | 3
Tibor Papp (HUN) | 2
Artur Olech (POL) | 3
Stefan Panayotov (BUL) | 2

Round of 16; October 16
Otto Babiasch (EUA) | 3
Shuta Yoshino (JPN) | 2
Robert Carmody (USA) | W
Thapa Namsing (NEP) | RSC
Sean McCafferty (IRL) | 3
Sulley Shittu (GHA) | 2
Fernando Atzori (ITA) | 5
Darryl Norwood (AUS) | 0
John McCluskey (GBR) | RSC
Stanislav Sorokin (URS) | W
Choh Dong-Kih (KOR) | 5
Dominador Calumarde (PHI) | 0
Constantin Ciucă (ROU) | 5
Winston van Cuylenburg (CEY) | 0
John Kamau (KEN) | 0
Artur Olech (POL) | 5

Quarterfinals; October 19
Otto Babiasch (EUA) | 1
Robert Carmody (USA) | 4
Sean McCafferty (IRL) | 0
Fernando Atzori (ITA) | 5
Stanislav Sorokin (URS) | W
Choh Dong-Kih (KOR) | DQ
Constantin Ciucă (ROU) | 0
Artur Olech (POL) | 5

Semifinals; October 21
Robert Carmody (USA) | 1
Fernando Atzori (ITA) | 4
Stanislav Sorokin (URS) | DNS
Artur Olech (POL) | W

Final; October 23
Fernando Atzori (ITA) | 4
Artur Olech (POL) | 1

== Sources ==
- Tokyo Organizing Committee (1964). The Games of the XVIII Olympiad: Tokyo 1964, vol. 2.
