= Mușenița =

- Commune
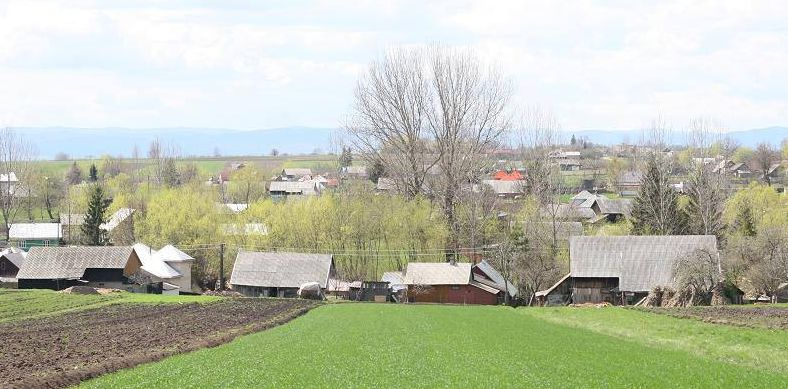
- Rural landscape from Băineț, Mușenița

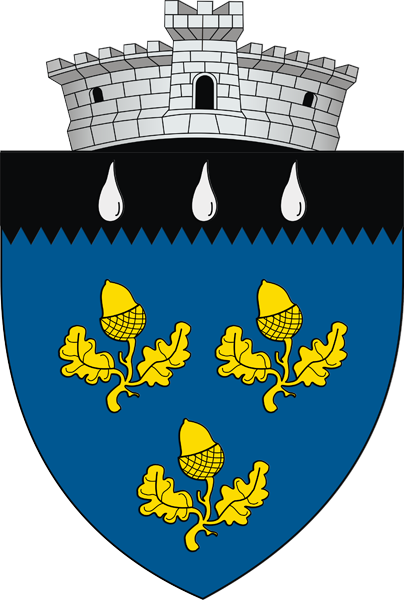
- Coat of arms

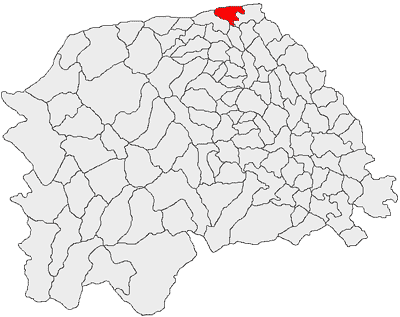
- Location in Suceava County

- Location in Romania
- Coordinates: 47°58′N 26°0′E
- Country: Romania
- County: Suceava

Government
  - Mayor (2020–2024): Radu-Florin Tudurean (PNL)
- Area: 40 km^{2} (15 sq mi)
- Elevation: 414 m (1,358 ft)
- Population (2021-12-01): 1,442
  - Density: 36/km^{2} (93/sq mi)
- Time zone: UTC+02:00 (EET)
  - Summer (DST): UTC+03:00 (EEST)
- Postal code: 727390
- Area code: +40) 0230
- Vehicle reg.: SV
- Website: primariamusenita.ro/wp/

Mușenița (German: Muschenitza) is a commune located in Suceava County, Bukovina, northeastern Romania. It is composed of six villages, namely: Baineț (German: Baincze) (the commune center), Băncești (German: Banczestie), Climăuți, Mușenița, Vășcăuți (German: Waszkoutz am Sereth), and Vicșani (German: Wikszany).

The commune is located in the northeastern part of the county, on the border with Chernivtsi Oblast, Ukraine, at a distance of 12 km (7.5 mi) from the town of Siret. The river Ruda flows through Baineț and Vicșani villages, discharging into the Suceava River in the neighboring Dornești commune, while the river Grăvan flows through Vășcăuți village, discharging into the Siret River.

Vicșani railway station serves the Căile Ferate Române Line 500, which starts in Bucharest and ends at the Romania–Ukraine border here.

The Mușenița gas field is located on the territory of the commune.

== Administration and local politics ==
=== Communal council ===
The commune's current local council has the following political composition, according to the results of the 2020 Romanian local elections:

Party	Seats	Current Council
National Liberal Party (PNL)	7	
Social Democratic Party (PSD)	1	
People's Movement Party (PMP)	1	
PRO Romania (PRO)	1	
Community of the Lipovan Russians in Romania (CRL)	1	

Historical population
Year	Pop.	±%
2002	2,240	—
2011	1,871	−16.5%
2021	1,442	−22.9%
Source: Census data

== Notable people ==
- Otto Babiasch (born 1937), German-Romanian (of Bukovina German origin) Olympic boxer
- Nichita Danilov (born 1952), Russian-Romanian poet (of Lipovan origin)
- Dumitru Ivanov (born 1946), Romanian rower

== Gallery ==
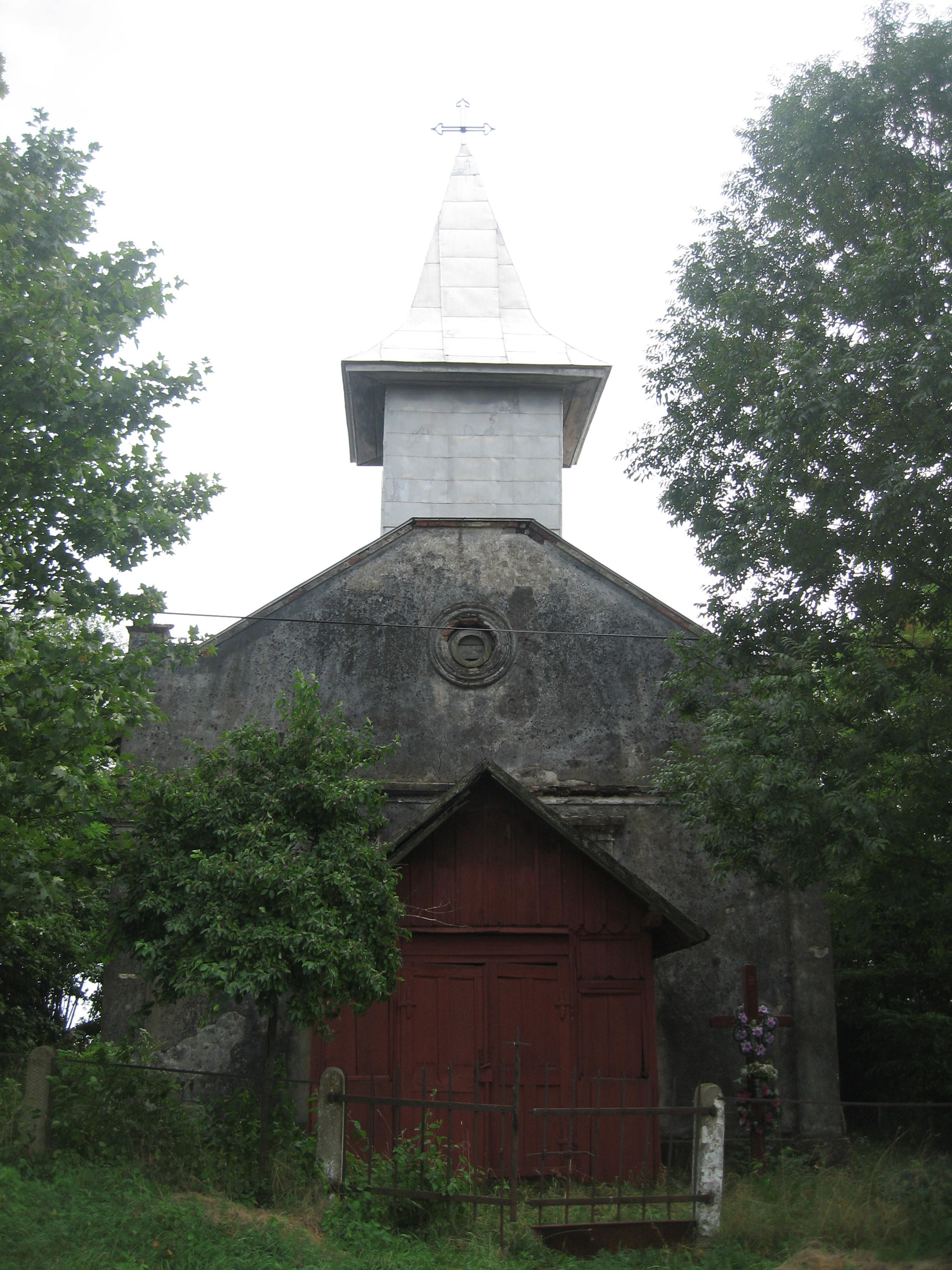
The Roman Catholic church in Baineț

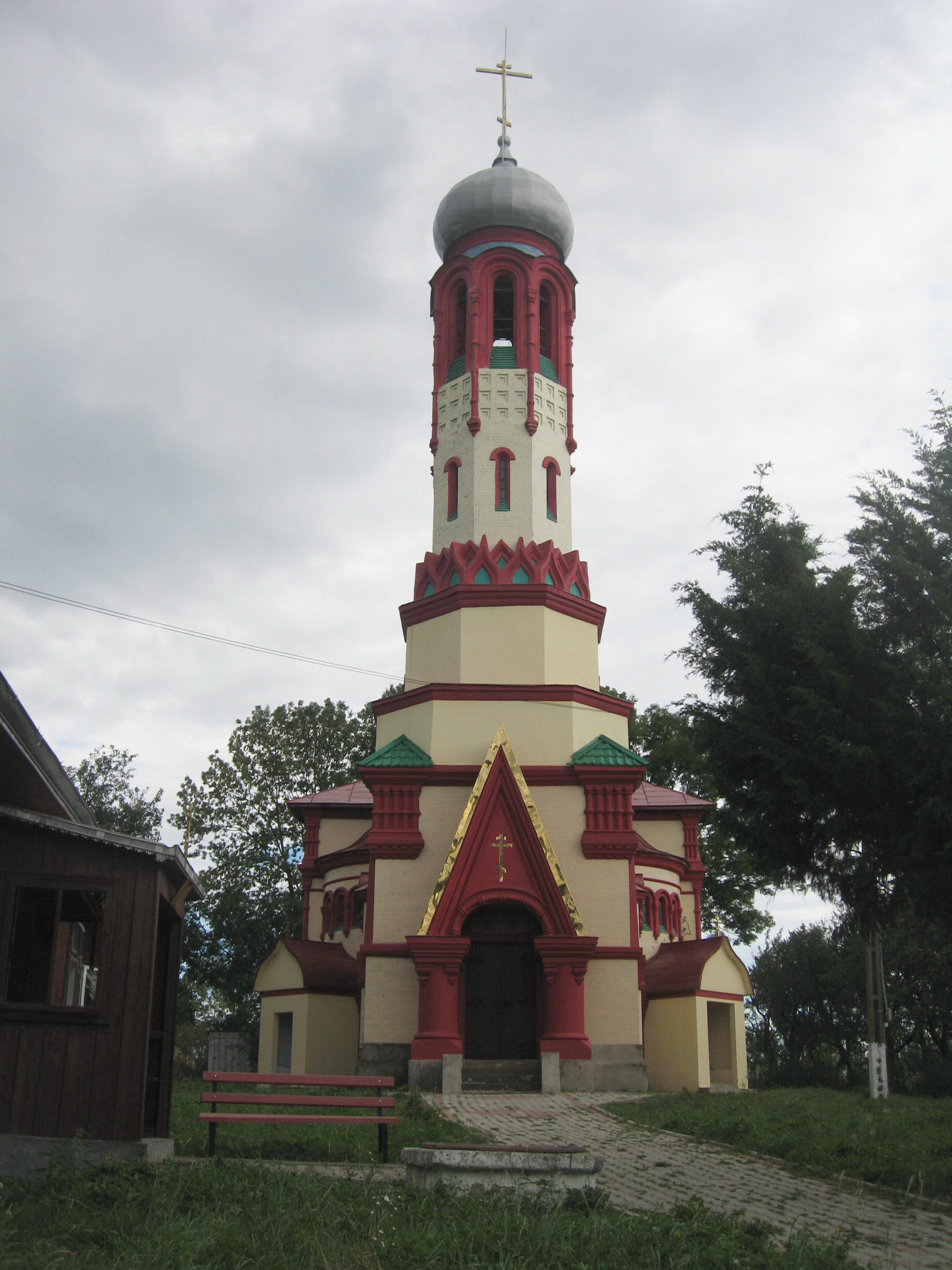
Lipovan Orthodox church in Climăuți

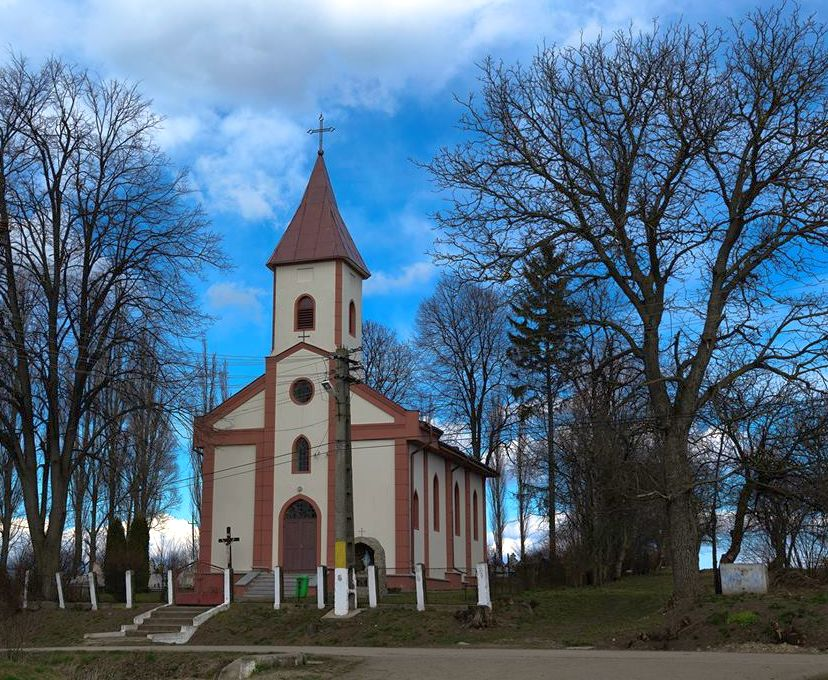
Roman Catholic church in Vicșani

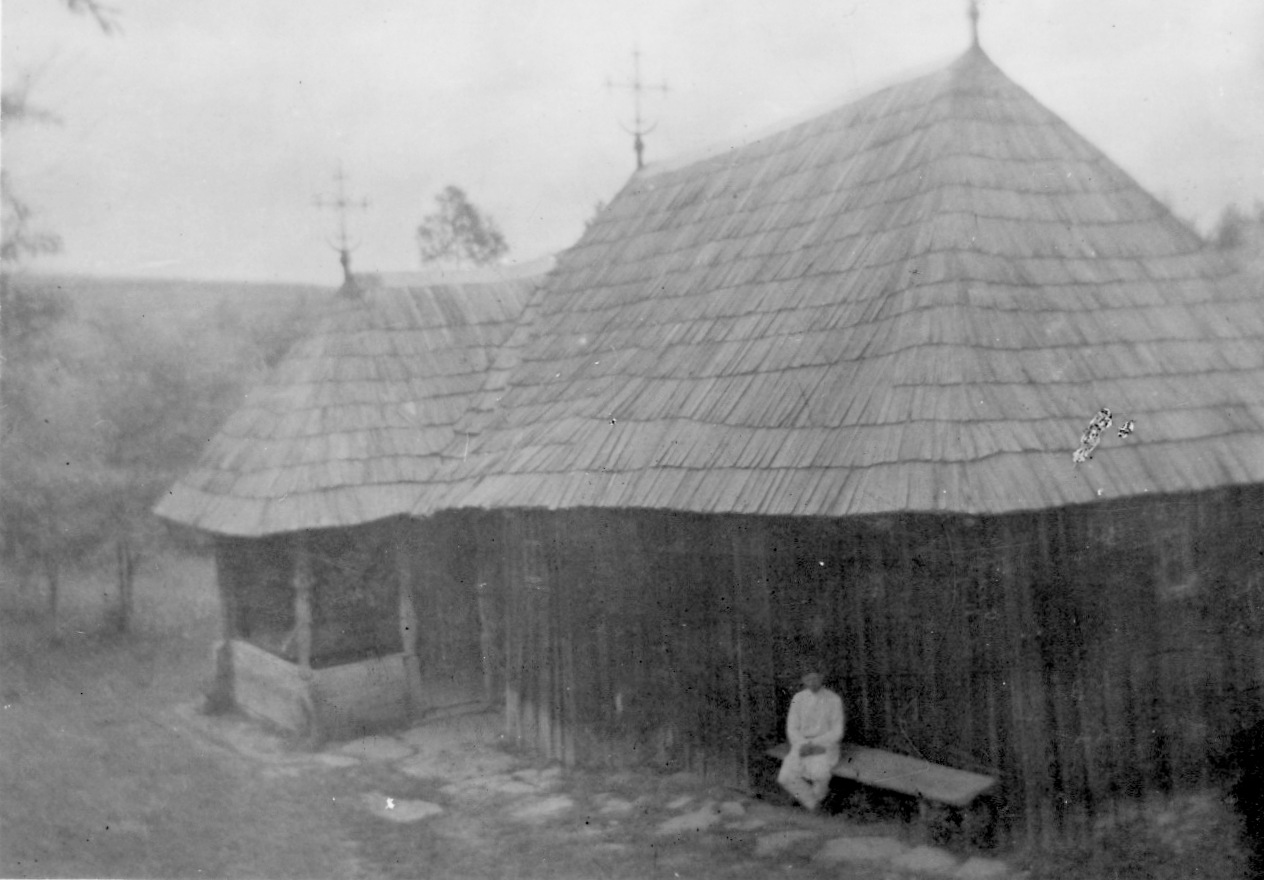
The old wooden church in Mușenița
