= Stefan Panayotov =

Bulgarian boxer

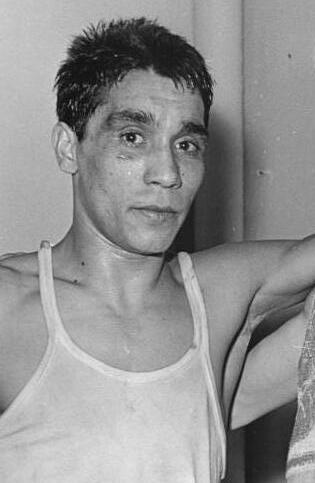
- Panayotov in 1964

Personal information
- Nationality: Bulgarian
- Born: 26 July 1941 (age 83)

Sport
- Sport: Boxing

Stefan Panayotov (born 26 July 1941) is a Bulgarian boxer. He competed in the men's flyweight event at the 1964 Summer Olympics. At the 1964 Summer Olympics, he lost to Artur Olech of Poland in the Round of 32.
