= Mersal (disambiguation) =

Mersal is a 2017 Tamil language vigilante action thriller film.

Mersal may also refer to:

== Arts ==
- Mersal (soundtrack), a soundtrack to the 2017 film
- Mersal al-Gharam, a 2004 Syrian novel by Fawwaz Haddad, also known as The Love Messenger

== People ==
- Iman Mersal (born 1966), Egyptian poet
- Hatem Mersal (born 1975), Egyptian former long jumper
- Mahmoud Mersal (born 1940), Egyptian former Olympic boxer
- Ragab Mersal (born 1945), Egyptian former Olympic table tennis sport
- Nafi Mersal (born 1960), Egyptian sprinter

== Other uses ==
- Mersalyl, an organomercury compound used as drug
