= Ruda (Suceava) =

- Location within Romania

Location
- Country: Ukraine, Romania
- Counties: Suceava County
- Villages: Baineț, Vicșani, Iaz, Dornești

Physical characteristics
- Mouth: Suceava
  - location: Dornești
  - coordinates: 47.8732°N 25.9972°E

Basin features
- Progression: Suceava→ Siret→ Danube→ Black Sea
- Tributaries
  - left: Cuila

The Ruda is a left tributary of the river Suceava. Its source is located in Ukraine, in the proximity of the village of Bahrynivka. The river then flows across the border into Romania, where it crosses the villages of Baineț, Vicșani, and laz before joining the Suceava near the village of Dornești. In Romania, its length is 13 km (8.1 mi) and its basin size is 41 km^{2} (16 sq mi).
