= Băncești =

Bănceşti may refer to several villages in Romania:

- Bănceşti, a village in Mușenița Commune, Suceava County
- Bănceşti, a village in Voinești, Vaslui
