= John Kamau =

Kenyan boxer

Personal information
- Nationality: Kenyan
- Born: 13 May 1947 (age 77)

Sport
- Sport: Boxing

John Kamau (born 13 May 1947) is a Kenyan boxer. He competed in the men's flyweight event at the 1964 Summer Olympics. At the 1964 Summer Olympics, he defeated Tibor Papp of Hungary, before losing to Artur Olech of Poland.
