= John McCluskey (boxer) =

Scottish boxer

Personal information
- Nationality: Scottish
- Born: 23 January 1944 Hamilton, Scotland
- Died: 17 July 2015 (aged 71)
- Weight: fly/bantam/featherweight

Boxing career

Boxing record
- Total fights: 23
- Wins: 13 (KO 4)
- Losses: 8 (KO 2)
- Draws: 2
- No contests: 0
Medal record
Boxing
Representing Scotland
European Championships
Bronze medal – third place	1965 Berlin	Flyweight

John McCluskey (23 January 1944 – 17 July 2015) born in Hamilton, South Lanarkshire, was a Scottish amateur flyweight and professional fly/bantam/featherweight boxer of the 1960s and 1970s.

== Boxing career ==
As an amateur he won the 1964 and 1965 Amateur Boxing Association British flyweight title, when boxing out of the Larkhall ABC.

He represented Great Britain at flyweight in the Boxing at the 1964 Summer Olympics losing to eventual bronze medal winner Stanislav Sorokin of the Soviet Union, and represented Scotland and won the bronze medal at flyweight at the 1965 European Amateur Boxing Championships, and as a professional won the British Boxing Board of Control (BBBofC) British flyweight title, and Commonwealth flyweight title, and was challenger for the European Boxing Union (EBU) flyweight title against Fernando Atzori (twice), and Fritz Chervet, his professional fighting weight varied from 110 lb (50 kg; 7 st 12 lb), i.e. flyweight to 119 3/4 lb (54.3 kg; 8 st 7.8 lb), i.e. featherweight.

=== 1964 Olympic results ===
- Round of 32: defeated Veerapan Komolsen (Thailand) by decision, 4-1
- Round of 16: lost to Stanislav Sorokin (Soviet Union) referee stopped contest
