= Veerapan Komolsen =

Thai boxer

Personal information
- Nationality: Thai
- Born: 16 March 1946 (age 80)

Sport
- Sport: Boxing

Veerapan Komolsen (born 16 March 1946) is a Thai boxer. He competed in the men's flyweight event at the 1964 Summer Olympics. At the 1964 Summer Olympics, he lost to John McCluskey of Great Britain.
