= Robert Carmody =

American boxer

Bob Carmody
Personal information
- Full name: Robert John Carmody
- Nickname: Butterball
- Born: September 4, 1938 Brooklyn, New York, U.S.
- Died: October 27, 1967 (aged 29) near Saigon, Vietnam
- Height: 5 ft 2 in (1.58 m)
- Weight: 112 lb (51 kg)

Sport
- Sport: Boxing
- Weight class: Flyweight (-51 kg)
Medal record
Men's boxing
Representing the United States
Olympic Games
Bronze medal – third place	1964 Tokyo	Flyweight
Pan American Games
Bronze medal – third place	1963 São Paulo	Flyweight

Robert John Carmody (September 4, 1938 – October 27, 1967) was an American boxer whose career, which had included a bronze medal at the 1964 Summer Olympics in Tokyo as part of the flyweight division, was cut short when he was killed in action serving with the United States Army in the Vietnam War.

== Early life ==
Born in 1938 to lower-class parents in Brooklyn, Carmody learned his trade in street fights near his home before joining the Army in 1957 and signing up for boxing classes with a close friend.

== Amateur career ==
Carmody proved a natural, and was quickly chosen to represent the 11th Airborne Division, continuing in this position after their deployment to Germany in 1958. In 1961, Carmody won his first All-Army flyweight boxing title, retaining it for the next four years until 1965. He also won the International Military Sports Council title in 1962 and garnered a bronze at the 1963 Pan American Games.

Attending the Olympic trials at the 1964 New York World's Fair the following year, Carmody won a shock victory over the favored Melvin Miller to secure a place on the 1964 Olympic team. At the training camp, Carmody formed a close friendship with Joe Frazier, at one point reportedly talking Frazier out of quitting the sport following an unexpected defeat. At the Olympics Carmody suffered a bruised hand, but still beat the Nepalese Thapa Namsing and the German Otto Babiasch before losing in the semi-finals to the eventual winner Fernando Atzori, thus claiming a bronze medal.

=== 1964 Olympic results ===
- Round of 32: bye
- Round of 16: Defeated Nam Singh Thapa (Nepal) RSC
- Quarterfinal: Defeated Otto Babiasch (Unified Team of Germany) 4–1
- Semifinal: Lost to Fernando Atzori (Italy) 1–4 (was awarded bronze medal)

== Outside the ring ==
After the Olympics, Carmody met and married Merry Sykes in Germany, and the two settled down into army family life, Robert and Merry had two children, Terri a daughter who lives in Roseville, CA and Robert Jr. a son who lives in Reno, NV with Carmody training several boxing teams at the International Military Sports Council games, including the U.S. Army squad and the Iraqi army boxing team.

== Death ==
In June 1967 Carmody was called up to go to Vietnam with his unit, D Troop of the U.S. 17th Cavalry Regiment. Several weeks after arriving, Carmody was killed in action while on a routine six-man foot patrol just to the north of Saigon when the patrol was ambushed by Viet Cong guerillas. Four other members of the patrol were killed and the single survivor reached safety after an arduous journey of eleven hours. Sergeant Carmody was posthumously awarded the Bronze Star for his valor for his actions during the ambush.
