= Nam Singh Thapa =

Nepalese boxer (1946–2026)

Personal information
- Born: 8 August 1946 Manakamana, Nepal
- Died: 3 January 2026 (aged 79) Tseung Kwan O, Hong Kong
- Height: 1.55 m (5 ft 1 in)
- Weight: 51 kg (112 lb)

Sport
- Sport: Boxing
- Weight class: Flyweight

Nam Singh Thapa (Nepali: नामसिंह थापा, pronounced [namʌsiŋɦʌ tʰapa]; 8 August 1946 – 3 January 2026) was a Nepalese boxer. He competed in the flyweight event at the 1964 Summer Olympics, being among the first Nepalese to compete at the Olympics.

== Biography ==
Thapa was born on 8 August 1946, in Manakamana, Gorkha, Nepal. He recalled that he grew up in a remote village where he herded cattle and "had to walk 45 minutes to get water". "I learned about suffering from birth", he said. His father, Kesh Bahadur Thapa, was a military officer, and he made Thapa enlist in the army in Malaysia when he was age 14, as part of the Brigade of Gurkhas. Thapa recalled that, "That was where I first heard the name of boxing. It was a compulsory sport in the platoon, which I ran away from so that I wouldn't have to play. I was arrested that day." He said that

The platoon commander sergeant held my ear and put boxing gloves in my hand and led me straight to the ring. A large crowd was shouting around the ring ... I heard a sound like a bell ringing somewhere. My opponent had started to punch me continuously. After receiving a few punches, I couldn't stand it. And I started to swing both my arms blindly. In the end, I won. The strength of my fists worked. Thus, I suddenly became the hero of the day. And I became interested in boxing.

Afterwards, Thapa trained for two years in Sungai Petani to become a better boxer. He said that his battalion had many sports, "cricket, hockey, swimming, gymnastics, volleyball, athletics, etc. [but] I loved boxing". He often fought against Malaysian, Chinese and Indian boxers in Malaya, Penang and Singapore. In his battalion, he was named the "Top Novice Boxer", "The Boys Champion" and received other honors at the start of his career. In 1962, he became a member of the 6th Queen Elizabeth's Own Gurkha Rifles regiment, where his father served.

After joining the regiment, he was moved to Hong Kong, where he became the top boxer for the Brigade of Gurkhas team. He competed and won the Land Force Boxing Championship, defeating a Royal Green Jacket boxer by knockout, then participated at the Far East Land Force Boxing Championship in 1963–64. He was the only person from the British Gurkhas to compete at the Far East tournament and won the event against Air Force, Navy and Army boxers, receiving a prize of HK$25,000. He later won the Hong Kong Colony Boxing Championship as well. In 1964, he competed at the Hong Kong Colony Belt, where he lost in the finals by decision despite knocking his opponent to the ground twice. The Asia Times noted that the "crowd clearly did not agree with" the decision and "littered" the ring "with eggs, banana peels, and paper". Despite his loss, he received a trophy for being the "Most Improved Boxer in Hong Kong" for 1963–64. He also received the offer of Hong Kong citizenship to compete there as a professional boxer, but decided not to take it.

Thapa was trained by Billy Tingle, an Australian boxer. Prior to the 1964 Summer Olympics in Tokyo, Tingle came up with the idea of having a Nepalese team at the games, which received the support of King Mahendra. For a year, Thapa and others were trained twice a day by Tingle in preparation for the Olympics. He was ultimately one of six people selected to compete for the first Nepalese Olympic team in 1964, along with three other boxers and two runners. Competing in the flyweight event, Thapa, aged 18 at the time, was defeated in the round of 16 by the American Robert Carmody, who finished with the bronze medal. Thus, Thapa was ranked ninth in the final standings.

According to the Asia Times, each of the boxers who competed for Nepal at the 1964 Olympics also had invitations to compete at the 1968 Summer Olympics, but "the Brigade of Gurkhas refused to send them. As a result, their boxing careers came to premature ends". In 1969, he had an offer to return to Nepal and become a member of the Nepali Army, but declined. He served with the Gurkhas for a total of 27 years until retiring in 1986. After his retirement, he moved back to Nepal, working as a welfare office in Rapti for three years. He then operated a chicken farm in Butwal. Thapa moved to Hong Kong in 1993, where he became a security supervisor. In 2022, he was honored by the Nepal Olympians Association and donated the jacket he wore at the Olympics to the Nepal Olympic Museum. He was married and had a son and four daughters. Thapa died from cancer on 3 January 2026 in Tseung Kwan O, Hong Kong, at the age of 79.
