= Dominador Calumarde =

Filipino boxer

Personal information
- Nationality: Filipino
- Born: December 23, 1946 (age 79) Cebu City, Philippines
- Height: 5 ft 4 in (163 cm)
- Weight: 123 lb (56 kg)

Sport
- Sport: Boxing

Dominador S. Calumarde (born December 23, 1946) is a Filipino boxer. He competed at the 1964 Summer Olympics and the 1968 Summer Olympics. At the 1964 Summer Olympics, he defeated Wang Chee-yen of the Republic of China, before losing to Jo Dong-gi of South Korea.
