= Otto Babiasch =

German boxer

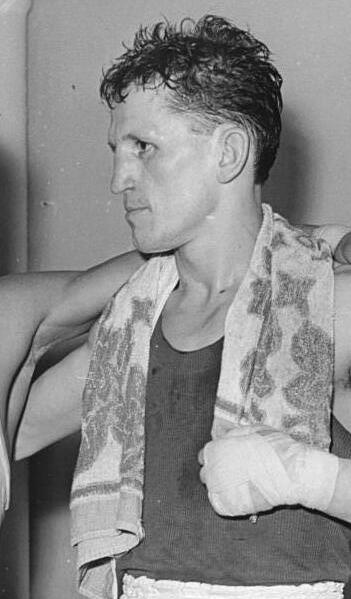
- Babiasch in 1964

Medal record

Men's Boxing

Representing East Germany

European Championships
Bronze medal – third place	1961 Belgrade	Flyweight

Otto Babiasch (born 21 March 1937 in Baineț, Romania) is a German former boxer who won the bronze medal at the 1961 European Amateur Boxing Championships in the flyweight category, representing East Germany. He competed for the SC Dynamo Berlin / Sportvereinigung (SV) Dynamo. He also competed in the men's flyweight event at the 1964 Summer Olympics.

== 1964 Olympic results ==
Below are the results of Otto Babiasch, a flyweight boxer who competed for the Unified Team of Germany at the 1964 Olympics in Tokyo:

- Round of 32: bye
- Round of 16: defeated Shuta Yoshino (Japan) by decision, 3–2
- Quarterfinal: lost to Robert Carmody (United States) by decision, 1-4
