= Sean McCafferty =

Irish boxer (born 1944)

Personal information
- Nationality: Irish
- Born: 17 December 1944 (age 80)

Sport
- Sport: Boxing

Sean McCafferty (born 17 December 1944) is an Irish boxer. He competed in the men's flyweight event at the 1964 Summer Olympics.
