= Căile Ferate Române Line 500 =

Romanian train line

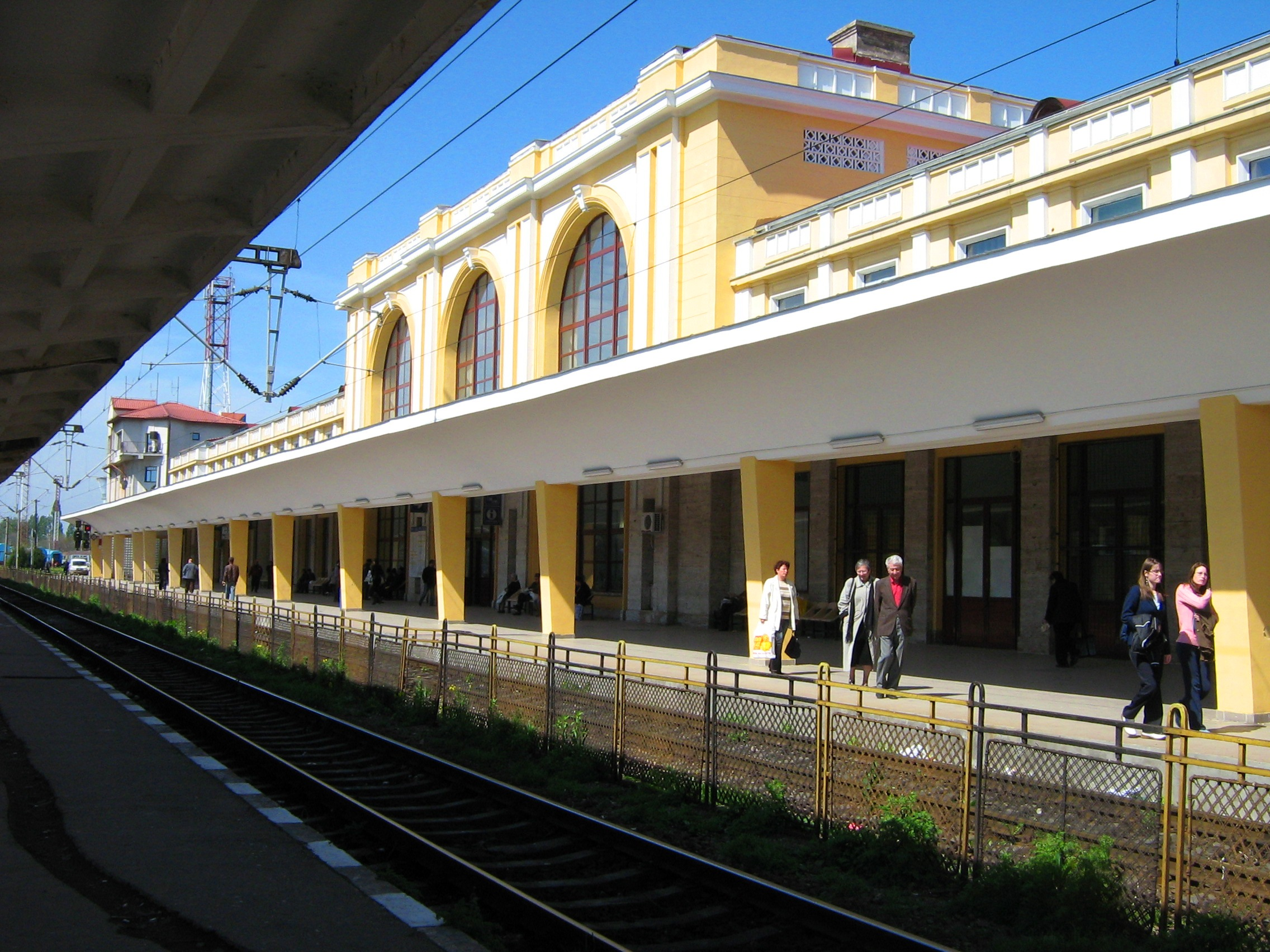
- Ploiești Sud railway station

Overview
- Locale: Ilfov, Prahova, Buzău, Vrancea, Bacău, Neamț, Iași, Suceava
- Stations: 34

Service
- Operator(s): Căile Ferate Române

Technical
- Line length: 647 km (402 mi)
- Track gauge: 1,435 mm (4 ft 8 1/2 in) standard gauge
Route map

Line 500 is one of Căile Ferate Române's main lines in Romania, having a total length of 488 km (303 mi). The main line, connecting Bucharest with the Ukrainian border near Chernivtsi, passes through the important cities of Ploiești, Buzău, Focșani, Adjud, Bacău, Roman, Pașcani, and Suceava.

== Secondary lines ==
Line	Terminal stations		Intermediate stops	Length (km)
501	Adjud	Siculeni	Comănești – Ghimeș-Făget	150
502	Suceava	Ilva Mică	Vama – Floreni	191
504	Buzău	Nehoiașu		73
507	Mărășești	Panciu		18
509	Bacău	Bicaz	Piatra Neamț	86
510	Dolhasca	Fălticeni		26
511	Verești	Botoșani		44
512	Leorda	Dorohoi		22
513	Suceava	Gura Humorului		45
514	Vama	Moldovița		20
515	Dornești	Nisipitu	Gura Putnei – Putna	59
516	Floreni	Dornişoara		22
517	Pașcani	Târgu Neamț		31
518	Dornești	Vicșani railway station		16

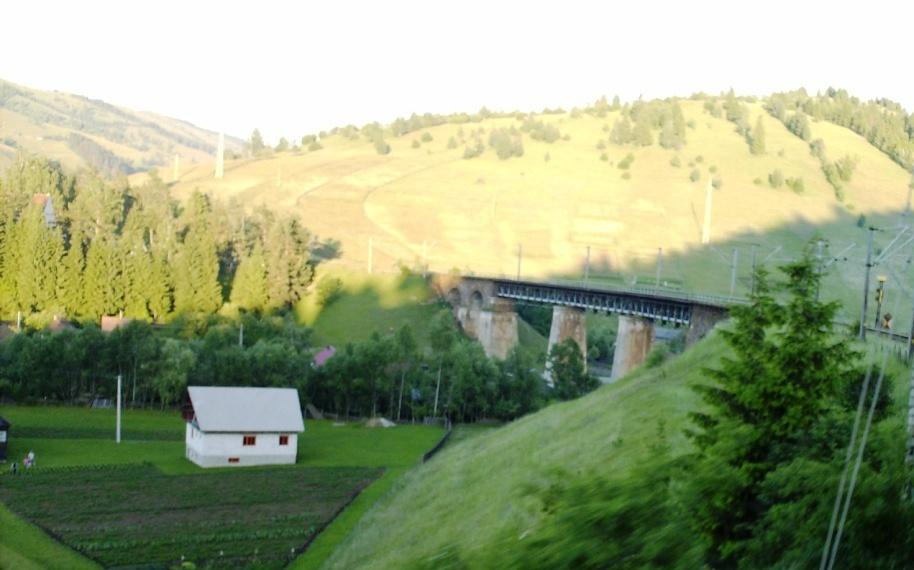
The bridge near Ghimeș-Făget on line 501
