= Manakamana, Gorkha =

Coordinates: 27°55′N 84°34′E

Manakamana, Nepal मनकामना
- Village development committee
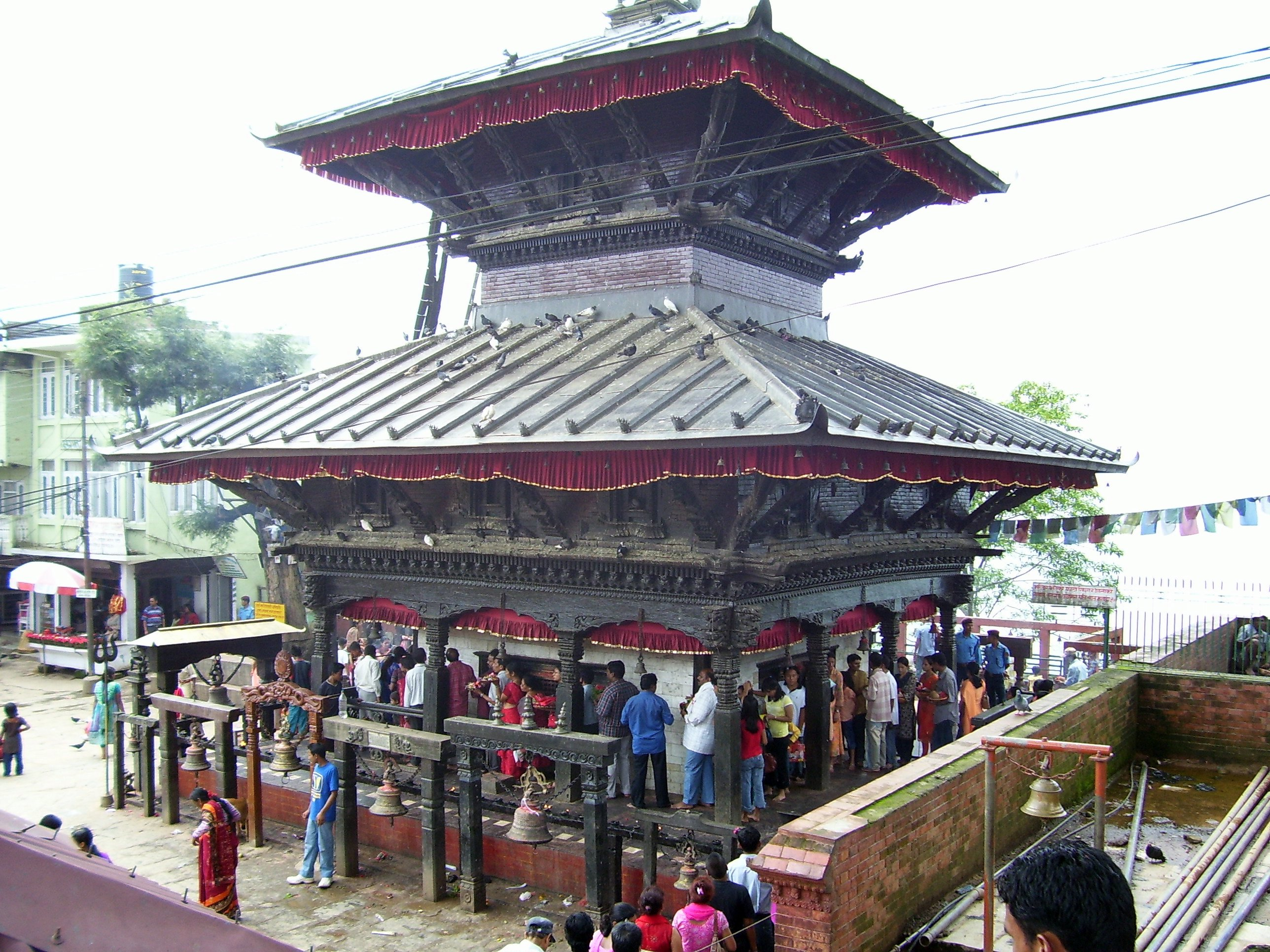
- Manakamana temple

- Location in Nepal Manakamana, Nepal (Nepal)
- Country: Nepal
- Zone: Gandaki Zone
- District: Gorkha District

Population (1991)
  - Total: 5,083
- Time zone: UTC+5:45 (Nepal Time)

Manakamana is a former village development committee in Gorkha District in the Gandaki Zone of northern-central Nepal. At the time of the 1991 Nepal census it had a population of 5,083 and had 889 houses in the town.

== See also ==
- Manakamana
