= Tibor Papp =

Hungarian boxer

Personal information
- Nationality: Hungarian
- Born: 5 April 1944; Oradea, Romania
- Died: February 2014 (aged 69)

Sport
- Sport: Boxing

Tibor Papp (5 April 1944 – February 2014) was a Hungarian boxer. He competed in the men's flyweight event at the 1964 Summer Olympics. At the 1964 Summer Olympics, he lost to John Kamau of Kenya.
