= Winston Van Cuylenburg =

Sri Lankan boxer

- Born: 11 January 1943 (age 82)
- Nationality: Sri Lankan
- Statistics
- Weight(s): 51 kg (112 lb)
- Height: 168 cm (5 ft 6 in)
- Boxing record
- Total fights: 16

Winston Van Cuylenburg (born 11 January 1943) is a former Sri Lankan bantamweight and featherweight boxer.

He competed at the 1964 Summer Olympics in Tokyo in the flyweight class, representing Sri Lanka, where he knocked out Lee Kam Wah from Hong Kong in the second round of their match. In his next match Van Cuylenburg was defeated by Romanian, Constantin CiucÄ, in a points decision. CiucÄ qualified for the quarterfinals, where he was defeated by Artur Olech, from Poland (the eventual silver medalist).
