= Constantin Ciucă =

Romanian boxer

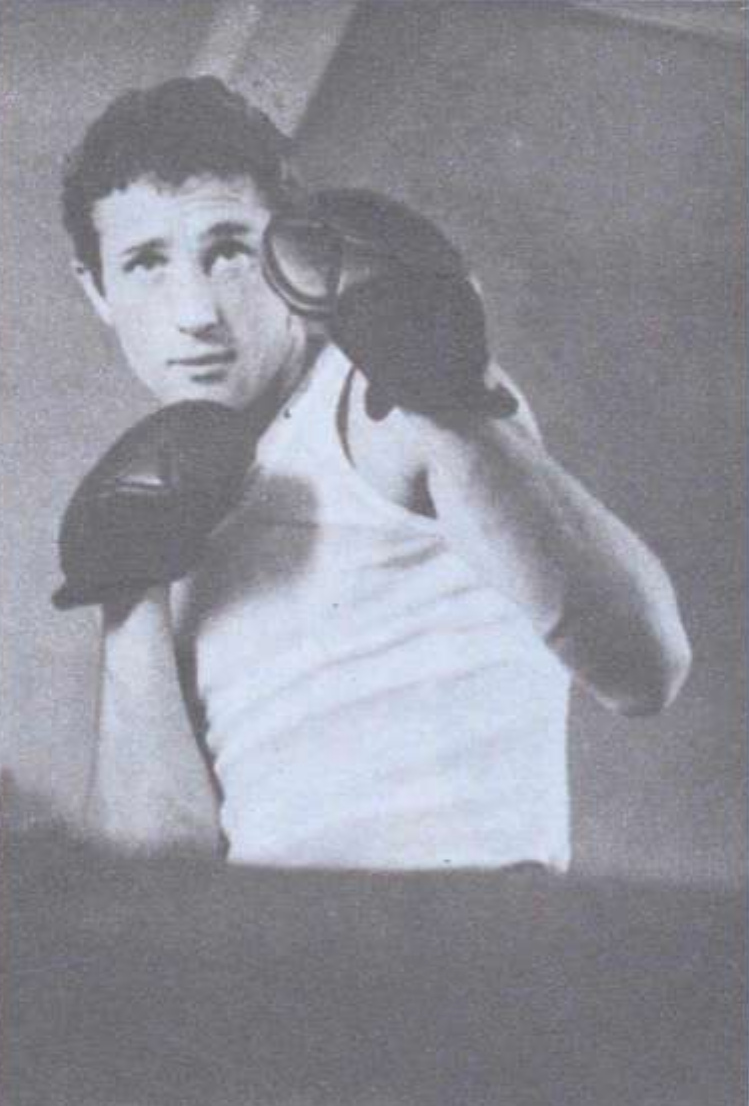
- Ciucă in 1969

Personal information
- Nationality: Romanian
- Born: 20 September 1941 (age 84) Vânători, Mehedinți, Romania

Sport
- Sport: Boxing
Medal record
Representing Romania
Romania National Amateur Boxing Championships
Gold medal – first place	1962 Bucharest	-51 kg
Gold medal – first place	1964 Bucharest	-51 kg
Gold medal – first place	1965 Bucharest	-51 kg
Gold medal – first place	1966 Bucharest	-51 kg
Gold medal – first place	1968 Bucharest	-51 kg
Gold medal – first place	1969 Bucharest	-51 kg
Silver medal – second place	1971 Bucharest	-54 kg
European Amateur Championships
Bronze medal – third place	1963 Moscow	-51 kg
Bronze medal – third place	1965 East Berlin	-51 kg
Silver medal – second place	1967 Rome	-51 kg
Gold medal – first place	1969 Bucharest	-51 kg

Constantin Ciucă (born 20 September 1941) is a Romanian boxer. He competed at the 1964 Summer Olympics and the 1968 Summer Olympics. At the 1968 Summer Olympics, he defeated Boujemaa Hilmann of Morocco, before losing to Artur Olech of Poland.
