= Lee Kam Wah =

Hong Kong boxer

Personal information
- Nationality: Hong Konger
- Born: 14 May 1940 (age 85)

Sport
- Sport: Boxing

Lee Kam Wah (Chinese: 李金華) (born 14 May 1940) is a Hong Kong boxer. He competed in the men's flyweight event at the 1964 Summer Olympics.
