= Mahmoud Mersal =

Egyptian boxer

Personal information
- Native name: محمود مرسال
- Nationality: Egyptian
- Born: 16 December 1940 (age 85)

Sport
- Sport: Boxing
- Event: Flyweight

Mahmoud Mersal (born 16 December 1940) is an Egyptian flyweight boxer.

== Career ==
Mersal competed in the Flyweight division at the 1964 Summer Olympics in Tokyo, Japan. He secured 283 Total Judges point and lost the bout 5–0 to Fernando Atzori of Italy, as the latter went on to win the gold medal.

== 1964 Olympic results ==
Below is the record of Mahmoud Mersal, an Egyptian flyweight boxer who competed at the 1964 Tokyo Olympics:

- Round of 32: lost to Fernando Atzori (Italy) by decision, 0-5
