= Shuta Yoshino =

Japanese boxer (born 1943)

Personal information
- Nationality: Japanese
- Born: 20 March 1943 (age 82); Akita, Akita, Japan

Sport
- Sport: Boxing

Shuta Yoshino (吉野 洲太, Yoshino Shūta, born 20 March 1943) is a Japanese boxer. He competed in the men's flyweight event at the 1964 Summer Olympics. At the 1964 Summer Olympics, he lost to Otto Babiasch from the United Team of Germany by decision in the Round of 16 after receiving a bye in the Round of 32.
