= Vicșani railway station =

Railway station in Romania

Coordinates: 47.941611°N 25.966916°E

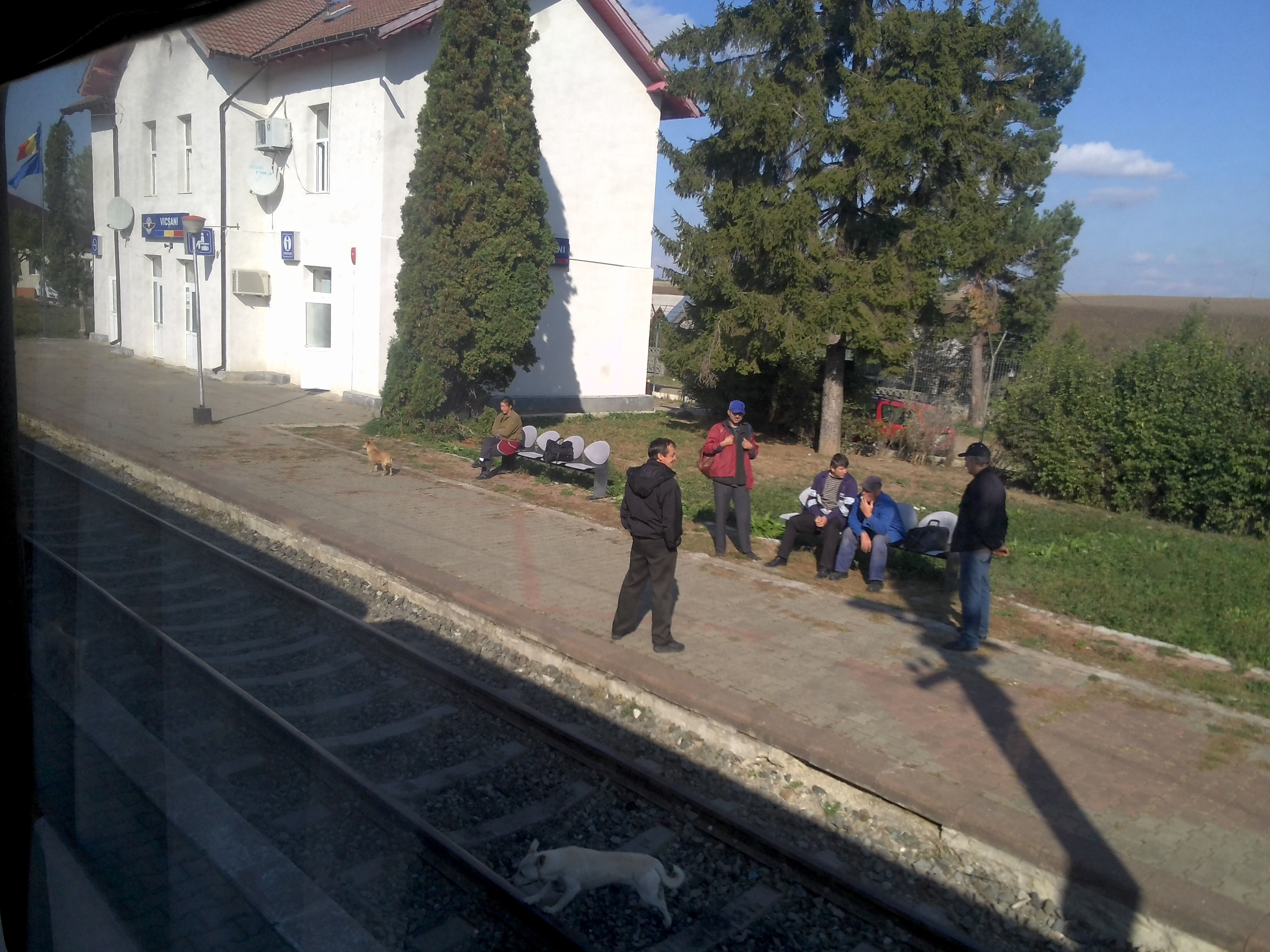
Vicșani railway station

Vicșani (Ukrainian: Вікшань) is a railway station near the town of Siret in Suceava County of northern Romania, 7km south of the Ukrainian border, on the line north from Bucharest.

The station functions as the border control point for crossings between Romania and the border transit station at Vadul-Siret railway station (Ukrainian: Вадул-Сірет) in Ukraine with immigration and customs controls. After crossing the border, trains can use gauge change equipment at Vadul-Siret to change from standard gauge to Ukrainian wide gauge of 1520mm.

Vicșani railway station serves the Căile Ferate Române Line 500.

In November 2022 as part of a joint Romania–Ukraine programme to provide extra rail capacity following the 2022 Russian invasion of Ukraine, six standard gauge and seven broad gauge tracks were reopened for traffic.

== See also ==
- Rail transport in Romania
- List of railway stations in Romania
- Suceava railway station
