= Stanislav Sorokin (boxer) =

Russian boxer

Stanislav Sorokin Станислав Сорокин
Personal information
- Nationality: Russian
- Born: 17 February 1941 Noginsk, Russian SFSR, Soviet Union
- Died: 2 February 1991 (aged 49) Moscow, Russian SFSR, Soviet Union
- Height: 5 ft 1 1/2 in (156 cm)
- Weight: Flyweight

Boxing career
Medal record
Men's amateur boxing
Representing Soviet Union
Olympic Games
Bronze medal – third place	1964 Tokyo	Flyweight

Stanislav Nikolayevich Sorokin (Russian: Станислав Николаевич Сорокин; 17 February 1941 – 2 February 1991) was a Russian amateur boxer. He represented the Soviet Union at the 1964 Summer Olympics held in Tokyo, Japan, winning a bronze medal in the flyweight division.
