= Former administrative units of Nepal =

Former administrative divisions of Nepal

The Former administrative units of Nepal were the administrative divisions during the Kingdom of Nepal. In 2008, Nepal was proclaimed a federal republic and old administrative units redistricted after the adoption of the new constitution on 20 September 2015.

Formerly, Nepal was divided into 5 development regions, 14 zones, 75 districts, 58 municipalities (before 2014) and 3157 village development committees.

== History ==
The Kingdom of Nepal was formed in 1768, by the unification of Nepal.

Before the treaty of Sugauli in 1814–16, the territories under Nepalese control included Darjeeling to the southeast, the whole of Sikkim to the east, Nainital to the south-west and the Kumaon Kingdom and Garhwal Kingdom to the west.

After the Sugauli treaty, Nepal was established in its modern form. During the time of king Rajendra Bir Bikram Shah (1816-1847) and prime minister Bhimsen Thapa (1806-1837), Nepal was divided into 10 districts.

During the time of prime minister Bir Shumsher Jang Bahadur Rana (1885-1901), Nepal was divided into 32 districts and Doti, Palpa and Dhankuta were the 3 administrative headquarters (Nepali: गौंडा, romanized: gaunda). The Hilly region had 20 districts and Terai had 12 districts.

Even after Bir Shumsher Jang Bahadur Rana and the end of Rana rule in Nepal in 1951, up untol the proclamation of new constitution of Kingdom of Nepal in 1962, Nepal remained divided into 32 districts. Each had a headquarters and a Bada Hakim (Nepali: बडा हाकिम, lit. 'Chief Administrator') as its head. From 1951 to 1962, many acts and constitutions passed which name the 32 districts.

In 1962, the districts were reorganized into 14 zones and 75 Development Districts.

In 1972 (2029 B.S.), King Birendra, in assistance with Dr. Hark Gurung, brought forth the concept of regional development for the harmonious developments of all parts of the country. Subsequently, in 1972, he divided Nepal into 4 Development Regions: Eastern, Central, Western and Far Western. Since the Far Western Development Region became too large in size, it was further divided by creating the Mid-Western Development Region in 1981. The Mid-Western Development Region was created out of the Karnali, Rapti and Bheri zones. This was done with the objective of achieving balanced, effective and rapid development programs in the country.

== Development Regions ==
Prior to September 2015, Nepal was divided into 5 Development Regions. They were first-level of administrative divisions.

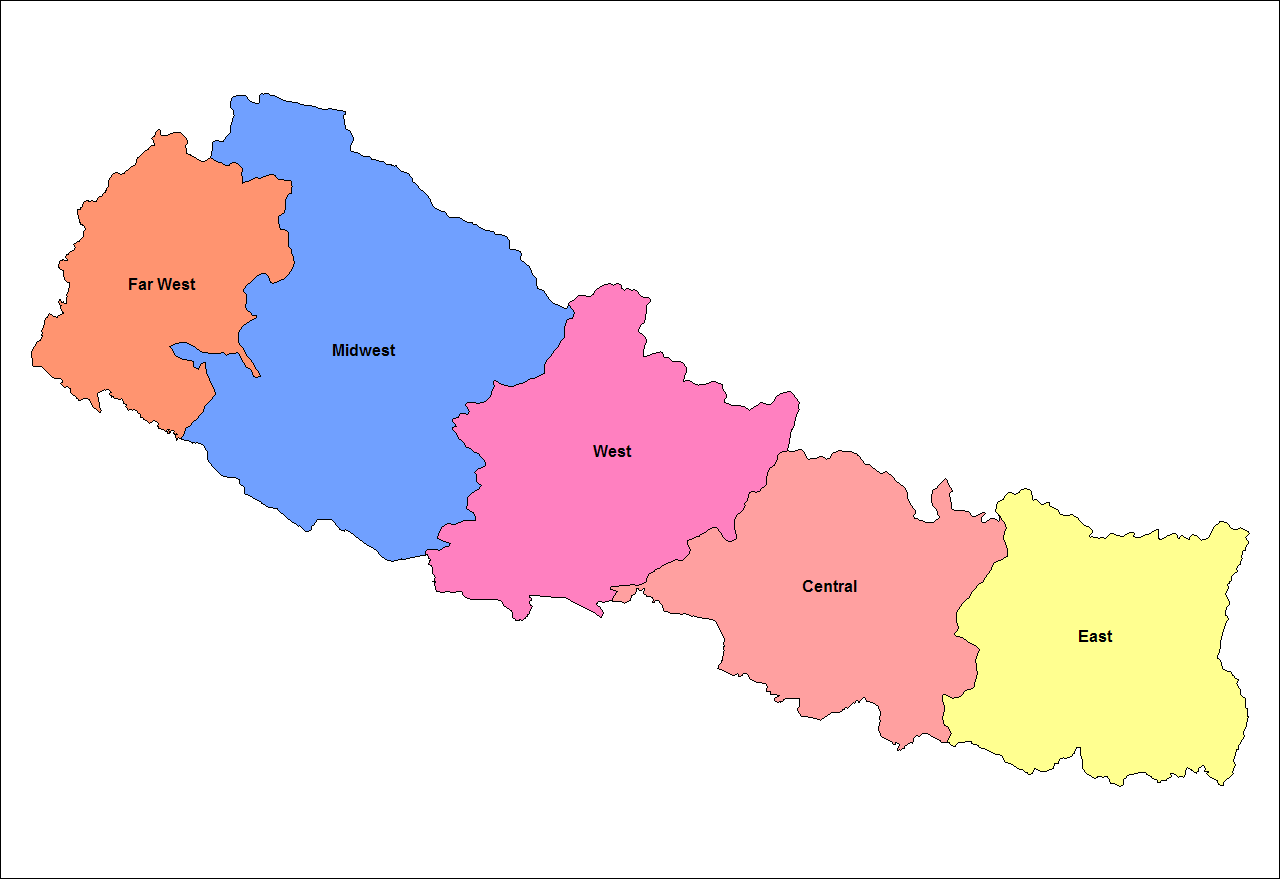
Development Regions of Nepal

Development Regions of Nepal
| sr. | Development Regions | Nepali Name | Headquarters | Area (km^{2}.) | Population (2011) |
|---|---|---|---|---|---|
| 1 | Eastern Development Region | पुर्वाञ्चल विकास क्षेत्र | Dhankuta | 28,456 | 5,811,555 |
| 2 | Central Development Region | मध्यमाञ्चल विकास क्षेत्र | Hetauda | 27,410 | 9,656,985 |
| 3 | Western Development Region | पश्चिमाञ्चल विकास क्षेत्र | Pokhara | 29,398 | 4,926,765 |
| 4 | Mid-Western Development Region | मध्य पश्चिमाञ्चल विकास क्षेत्र | Birendranagar | 42,378 | 3,546,682 |
| 5 | Far-Western Development Region | सुदुर पश्चिमाञ्चल विकास क्षेत्र | Dipayal | 19,539 | 2,552,517 |
| | Nepal | नेपाल | Kathmandu | 147,181 | 26,494,504 |

== Zones ==
Within the five Development Regions, there were 14 zones. Each development region had 3 zones, except for the Far-Western Development Region which had 2 zones.

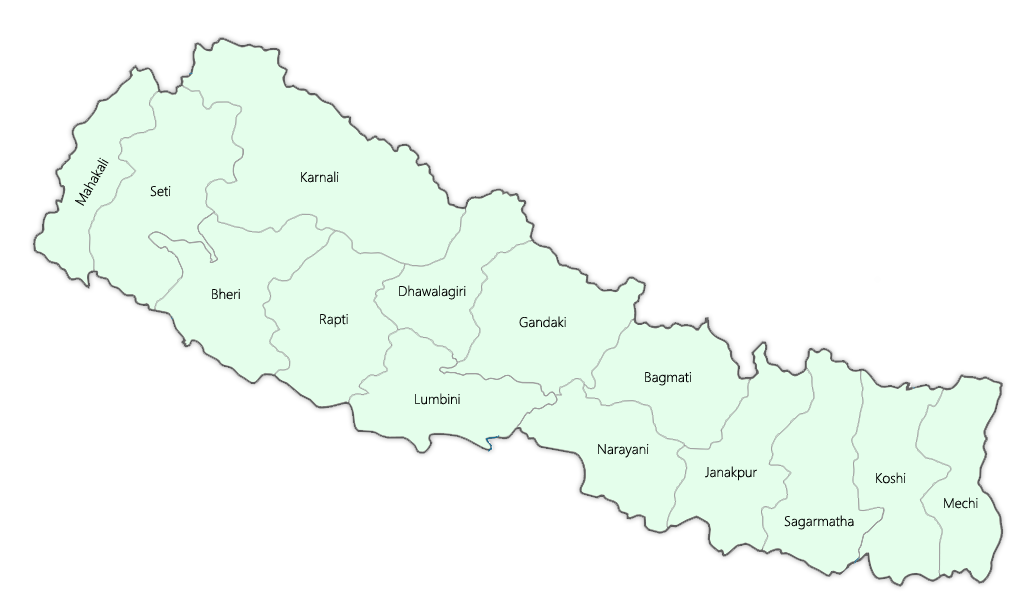
Zones of Nepal

Zones of Nepal
| sr. | Regions | Zones | Headquarters | Area (km^{2}.) | Population (2011) |
|---|---|---|---|---|---|
| 1 | Eastern | Mechi Zone | Ilam | 8,196 | 1,422,182 |
| 2 | Eastern | Kosi Zone | Biratnagar | 9,669 | 2,335,047 |
| 3 | Eastern | Sagarmatha Zone | Rajbiraj | 10,591 | 2,054,326 |
| 4 | Central | Janakpur Zone | Jaleshwar | 9,669 | 2,837,481 |
| 5 | Central | Bagmati Zone | Kathmandu | 9,428 | 3,843,596 |
| 6 | Central | Narayani Zone | Birgunj | 8,313 | 2,975,908 |
| 7 | Western | Gandaki Zone | Pokhara | 12,275 | 1,549,857 |
| 8 | Western | Lumbini Zone | Butwal | 8,975 | 2,834,612 |
| 9 | Western | Dhawalagiri Zone | Baglung | 8,148 | 542,296 |
| 10 | Mid-West | Rapti Zone | Tulsipur | 10,482 | 1,456,202 |
| 11 | Mid-West | Karnali Zone | Chandannath | 21,351 | 388,713 |
| 12 | Mid-West | Bheri Zone | Nepalganj | 10,545 | 1,701,767 |
| 13 | Far-West | Seti Zone | Dhangadhi | 12,550 | 1,575,003 |
| 14 | Far-West | Mahakali Zone | Bhimdatta | 6,989 | 977,514 |
| | Nepal | 14 Zones | Kathmandu | 147,181 | 26,494,504 |

== Districts ==
Within the zones, there were 75 districts in Nepal before 2015. Two new districts were formed in 2015. District Development Committees (DDCs) were established to carry out all the administrative as well as clerical functions of a district.

Zones of Nepal

List of Districts (Zonewise):

=== Eastern Development Region ===
==== Mechi Zone ====
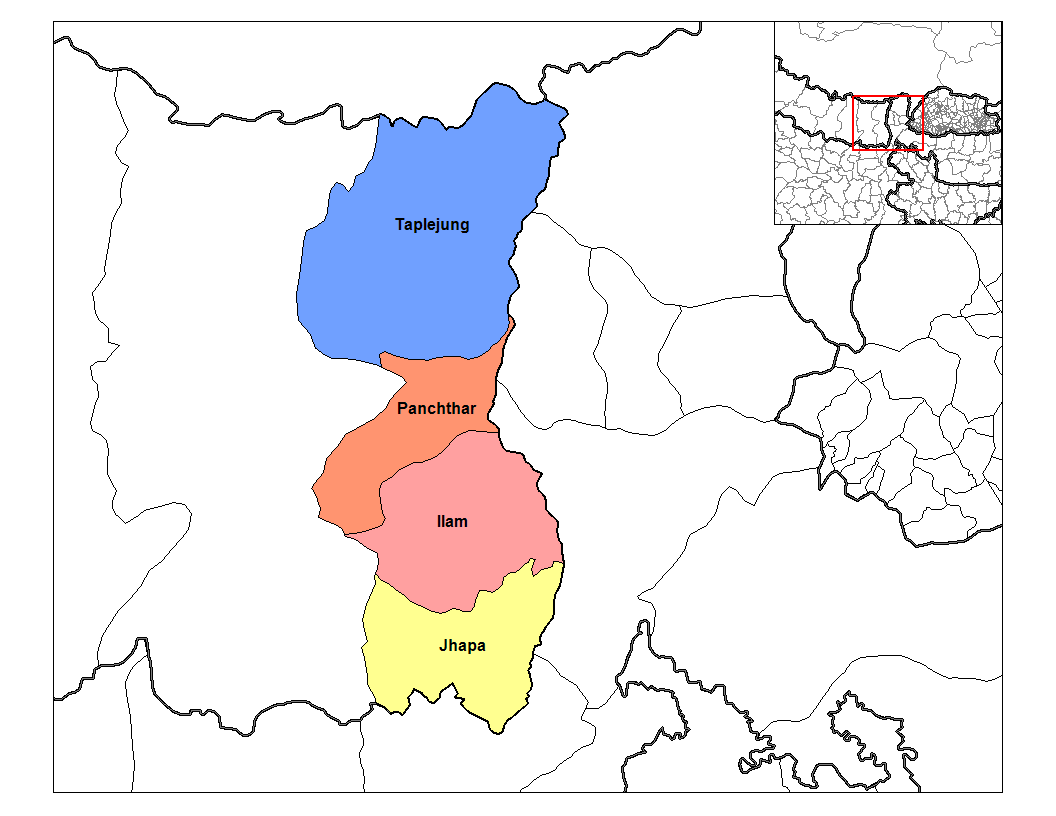
Districts of Mechi

Outer Terai

Jhapa District (Chandragadhi)

Hill

Ilam District (Ilam)
Panchthar District (Phidim)

Mountain

Taplejung District (Phungling)

==== Koshi Zone ====
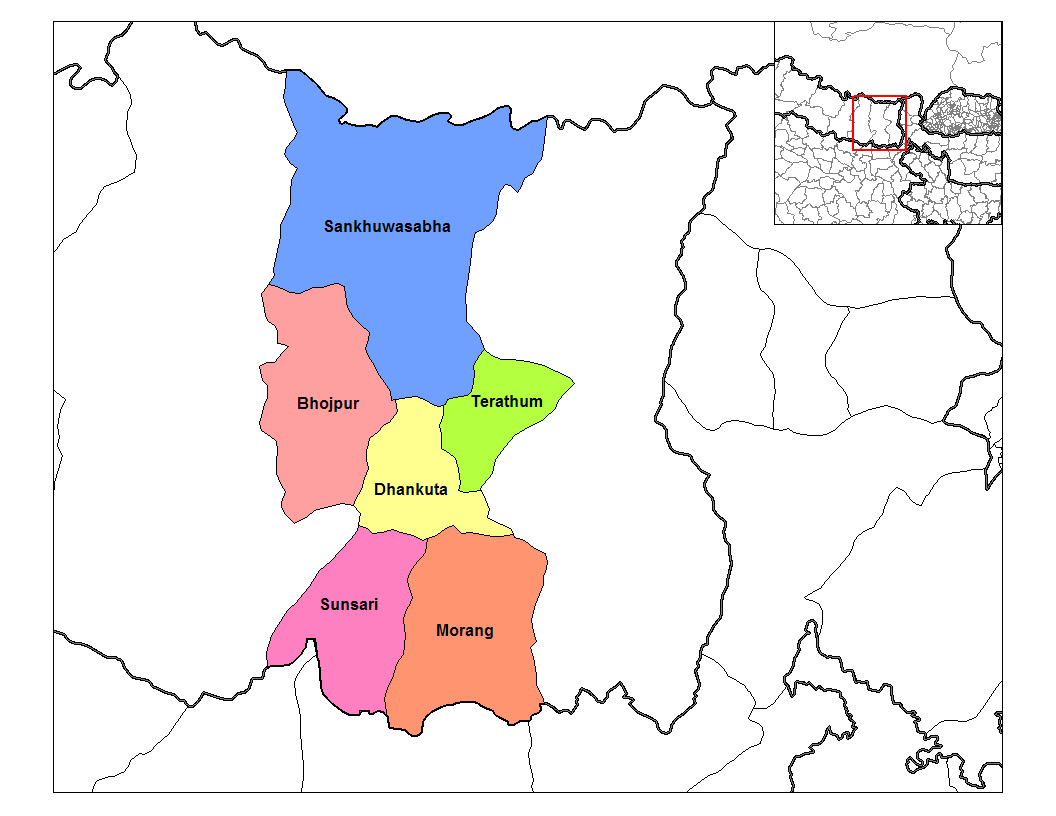
Districts of Koshi

Outer Terai

Morang District (Biratnagar)
Sunsari District (Inaruwa)

Hill

Bhojpur District (Bhojpur)
Dhankuta District (Dhankuta)
Terhathum District (Myanglung)

Mountain

Sankhuwasabha District (Khandbari)

==== Sagarmatha Zone ====
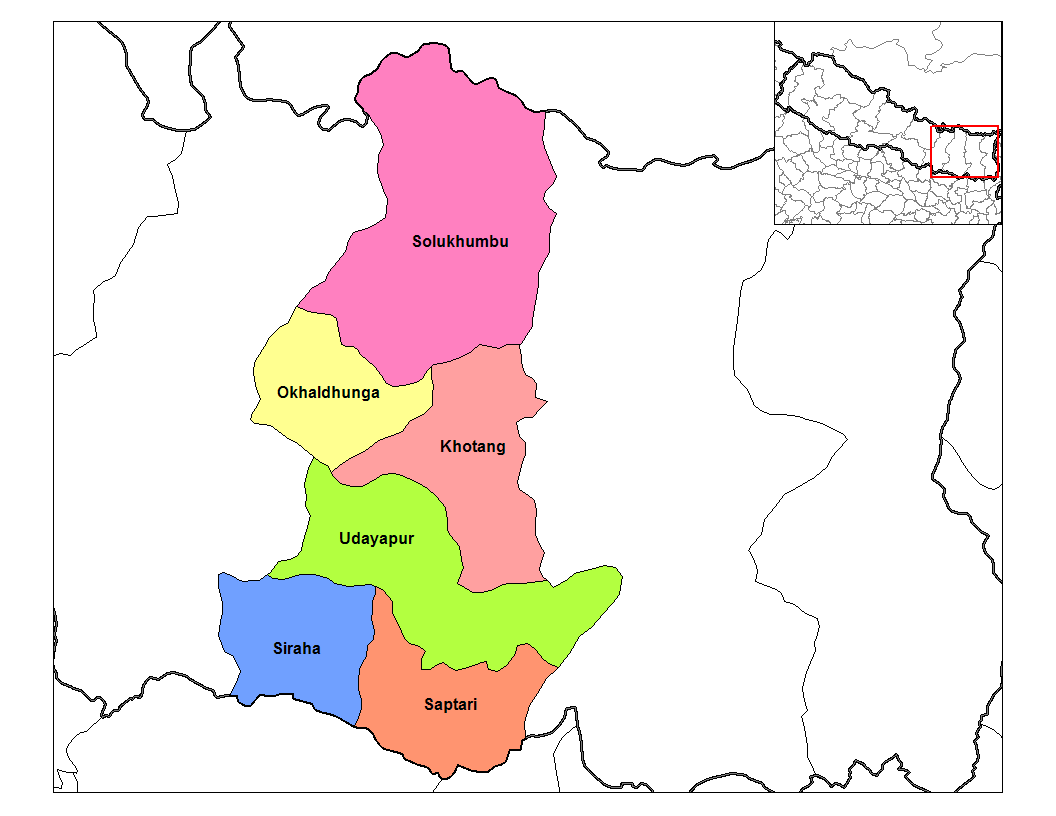
Districts of Sagarmatha

Outer Terai

Saptari District (Rajbiraj)
Siraha District (Siraha)

Inner Terai

Udayapur District (Gaighat)

Hill

Khotang District (Diktel)
Okhaldhunga District (Okhaldhunga)

Mountain

Solukhumbu District (Salleri)

=== Central Development Region ===
==== Janakpur Zone ====
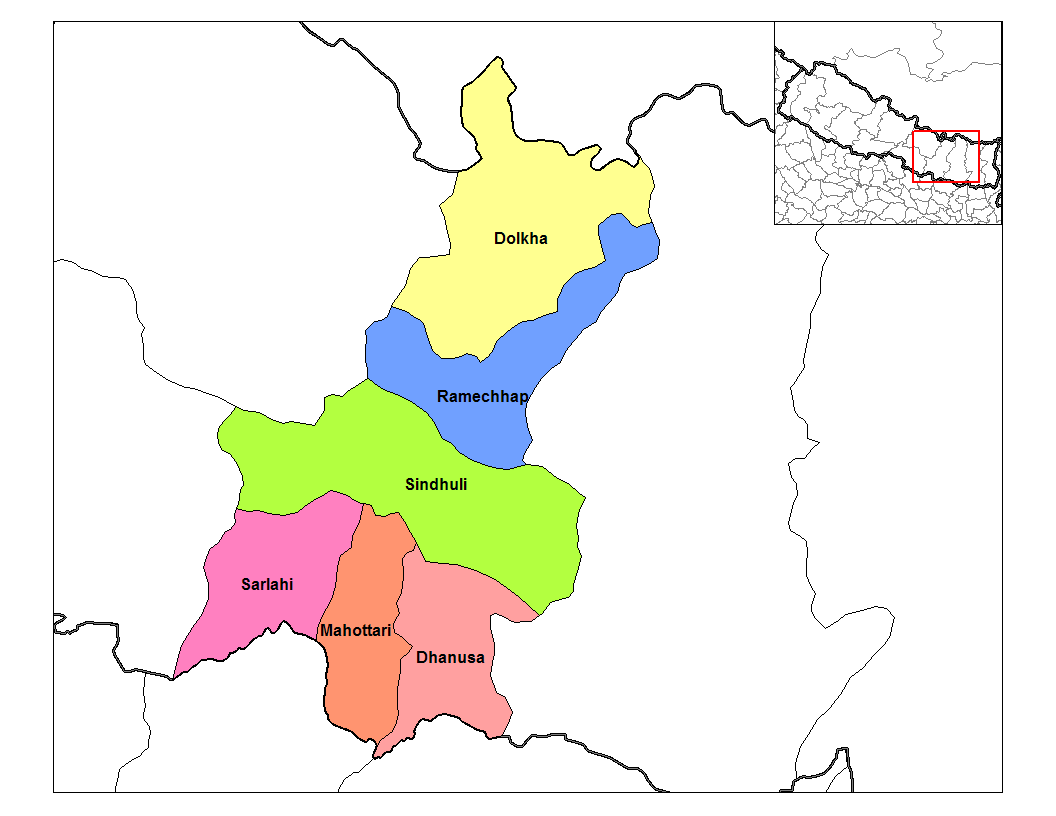
Districts of Janakpur

Outer Terai

Dhanusa District (Janakpur)
Mahottari District (Jaleswar)
Sarlahi District (Malangwa)

Inner Terai

Sindhuli District (Sindhulimadhi)

Hill

Ramechhap District (Manthali)

Mountain

Dolakha District (Charikot)

==== Bagmati Zone ====
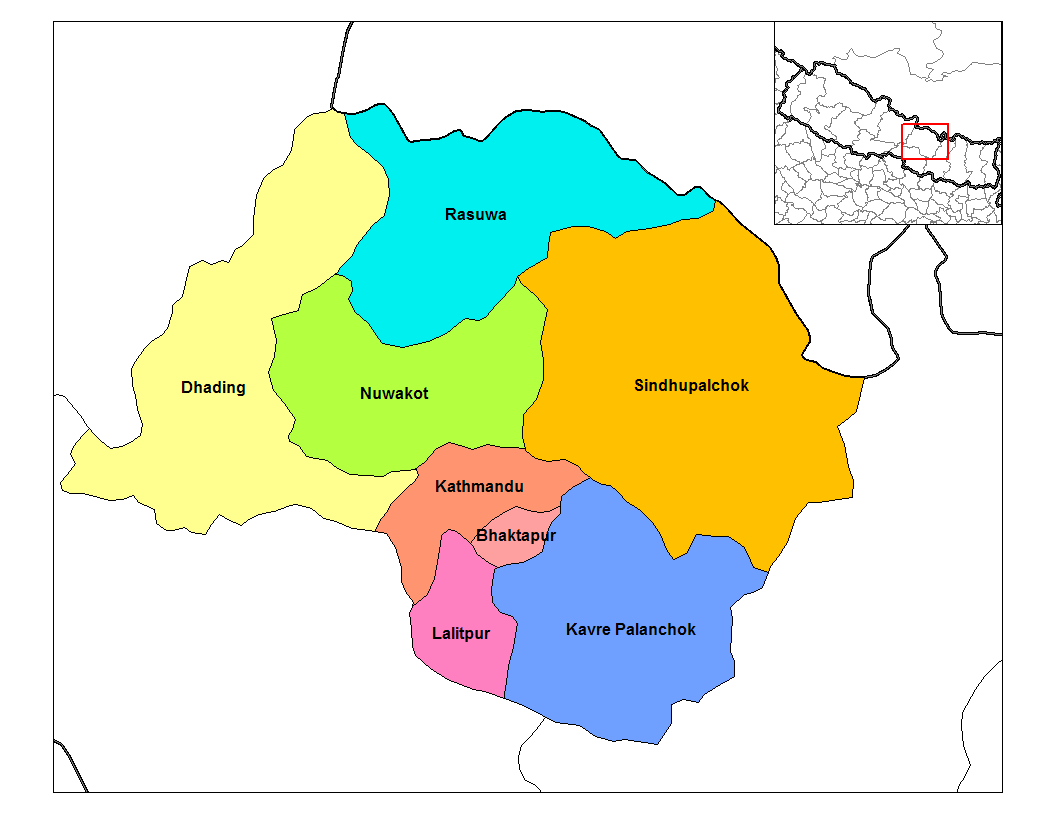
Districts of Bagmati

Hill

Bhaktapur District (Bhaktapur)
Dhading District (Dhading Besi)
Kathmandu District (Kathmandu)
Kavrepalanchok District (Dhulikhel)
Lalitpur District (Lalitpur)
Nuwakot District (Bidur)

Mountain

Rasuwa District (Dhunche)
Sindhupalchok District (Chautara)

==== Narayani Zone ====
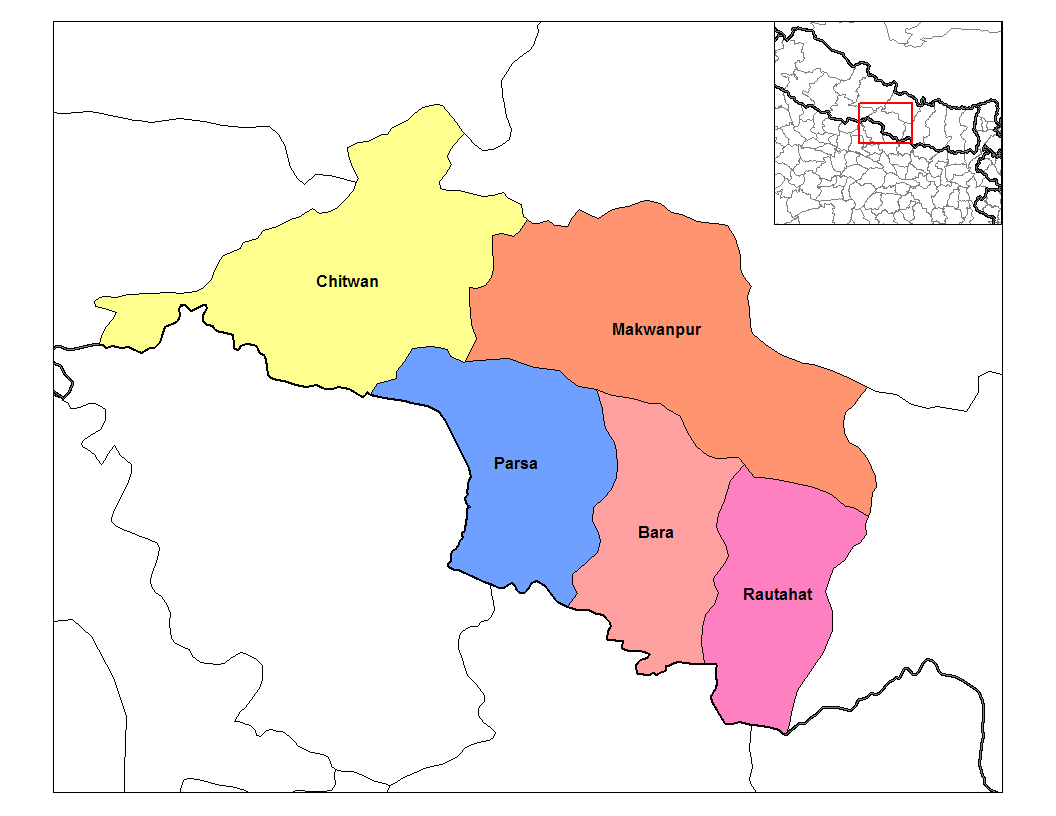
Districts of Narayani

Outer Terai

Bara District (Kalaiya)
Parsa District (Birgunj)
Rautahat District (Gaur)

Inner Terai

Chitwan District (Bharatpur)
Makwanpur District (Hetauda)

=== Western Development Region ===
==== Gandaki Zone ====
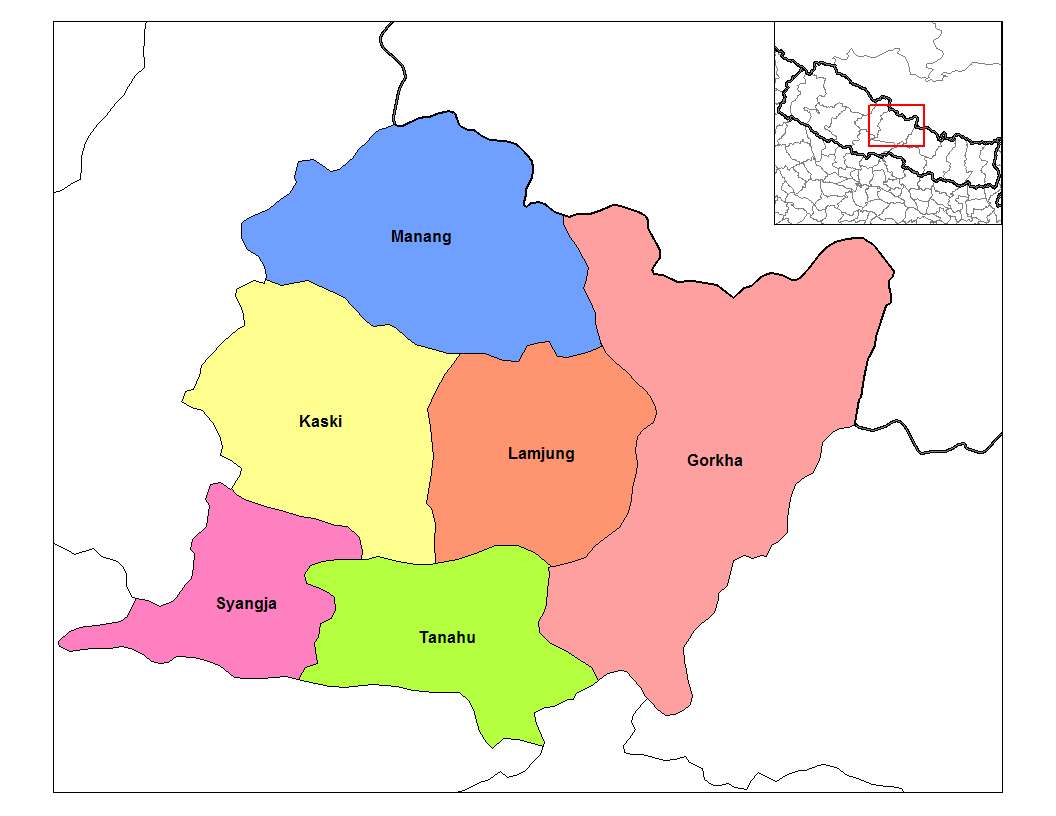
Districts of Gandaki

Hill

Gorkha District (Gorkha)
Kaski District (Pokhara)
Lamjung District (Besisahar)
Syangja District (Syangja)
Tanahun District (Byas)

Mountain

Manang District (Chame)

==== Lumbini Zone ====
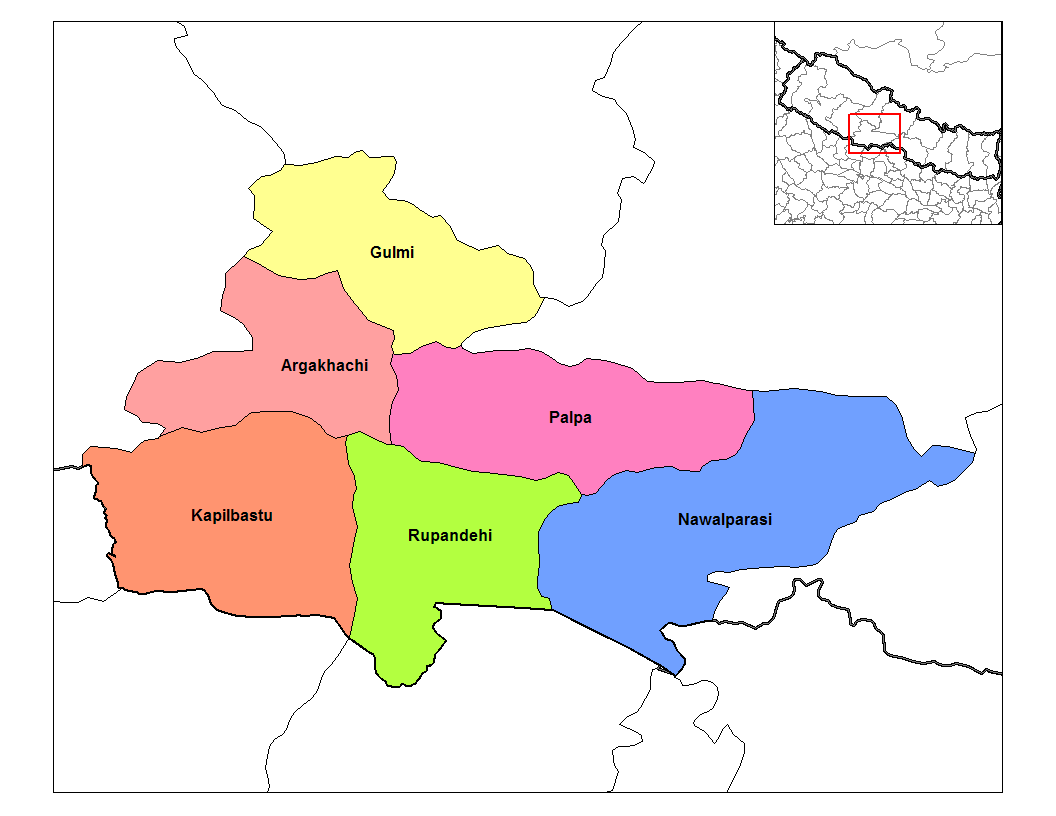
Districts of Lumbini

Outer Terai

Kapilvastu District (Kapilvastu)
Nawalparasi District (Parasi)
Rupandehi District (Siddharthanagar)

Hill

Arghakhanchi District (Sandhikharka)
Gulmi District (Tamghas)
Palpa District (Tansen)

==== Daulagiri Zone ====
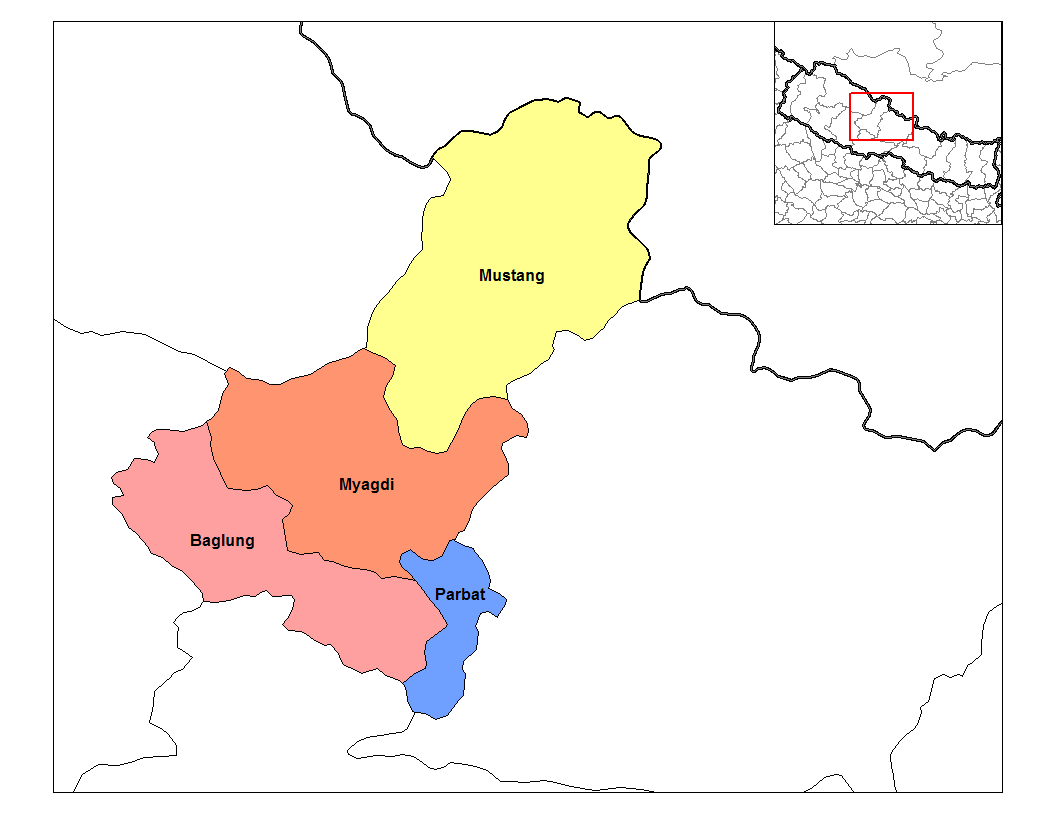
Districts of Dhaulagiri

Hill

Baglung District (Baglung)
Myagdi District (Beni)
Parbat District (Kusma)

Mountain

Mustang District (Jomsom)

=== Mid-Western Development Region ===
==== Rapti Zone ====
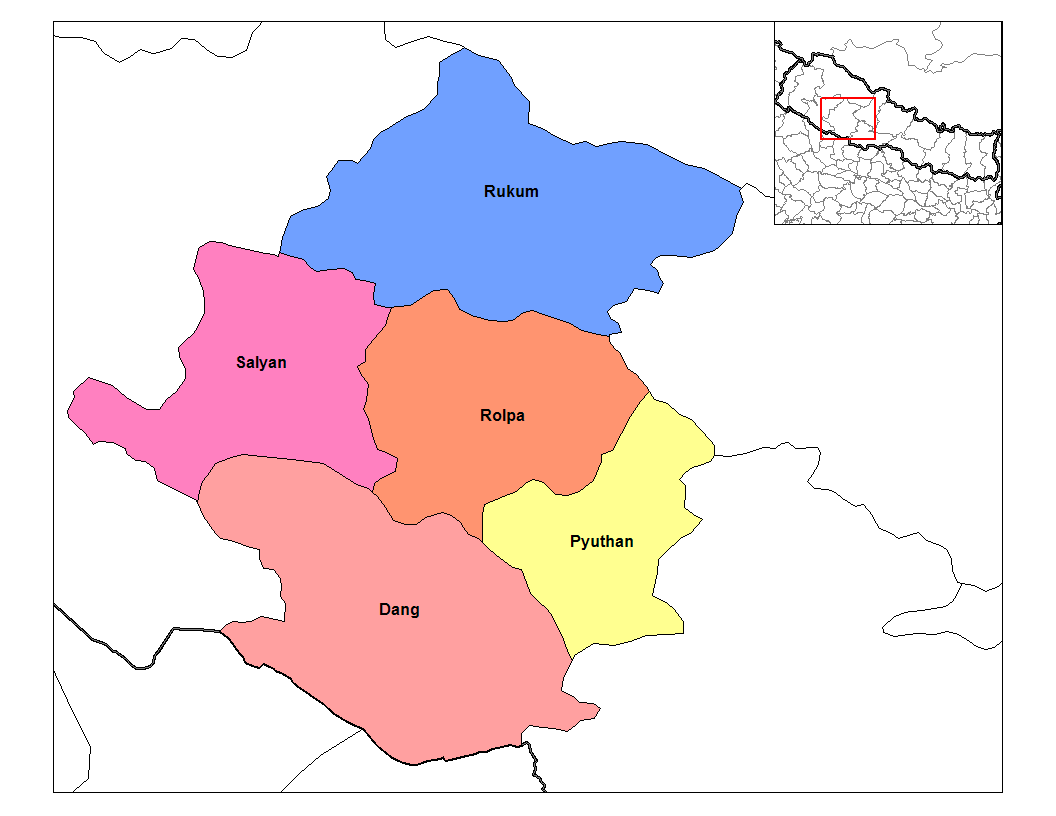
Districts of Rapti

Inner Terai

Dang District (Ghorahi)

Hill

Pyuthan District (Pyuthan Khalanga)
Rolpa District (Liwang)
Rukum District (Musikot)
Salyan District (Salyan Khalanga)

==== Karnali Zone ====
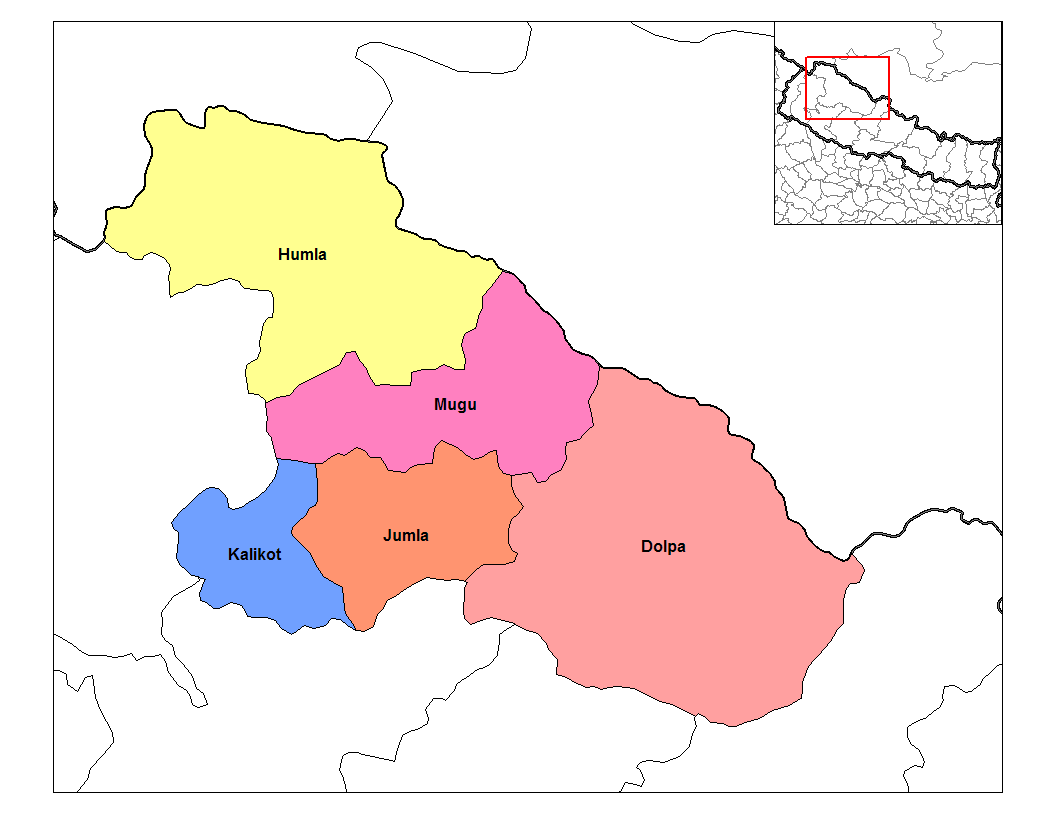
Districts of Karnali

Mountain

Dolpa District (Dunai)
Humla District (Simikot)
Jumla District (Jumla Khalanga)
Kalikot District (Manma)
Mugu District (Gamgadhi)

==== Bheri Zone ====
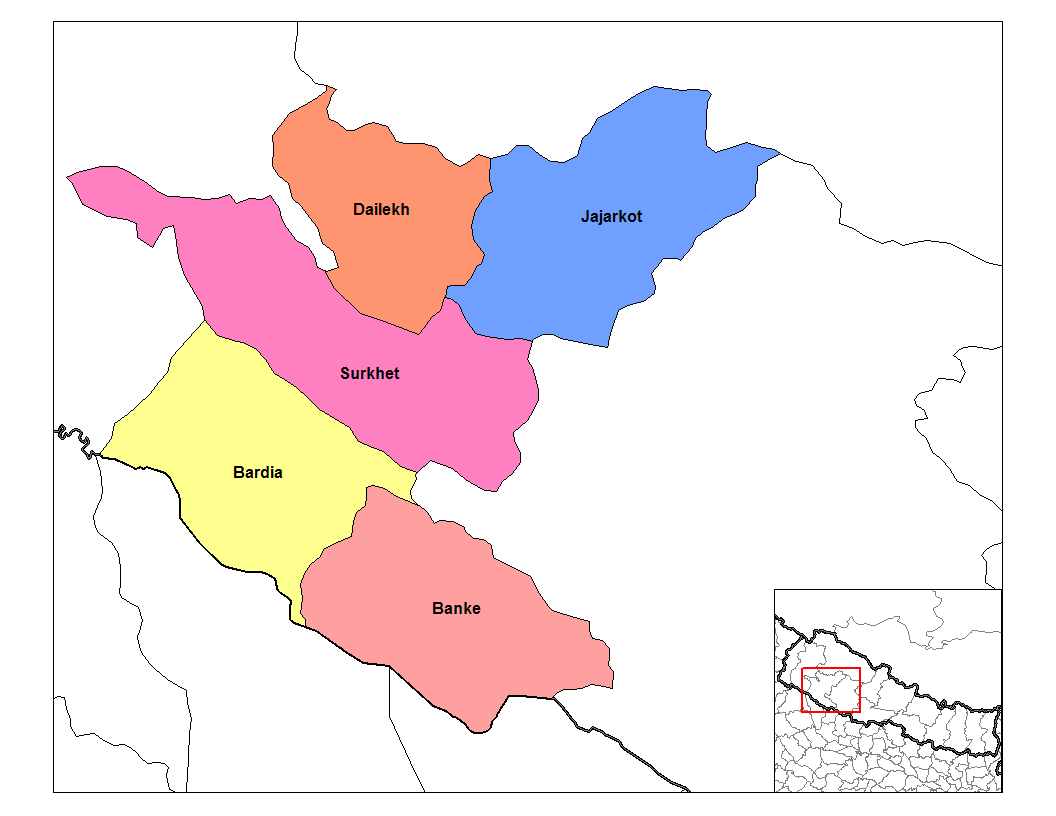
Districts of Bheri

Outer Terai

Banke District (Nepalganj)
Bardiya District (Gulariya)

Inner Terai

Surkhet District (Birendranagar)

Hill

Dailekh District (Narayan)
Jajarkot District (Khalanga)

=== Far-Western Development Region ===
==== Seti Zone ====
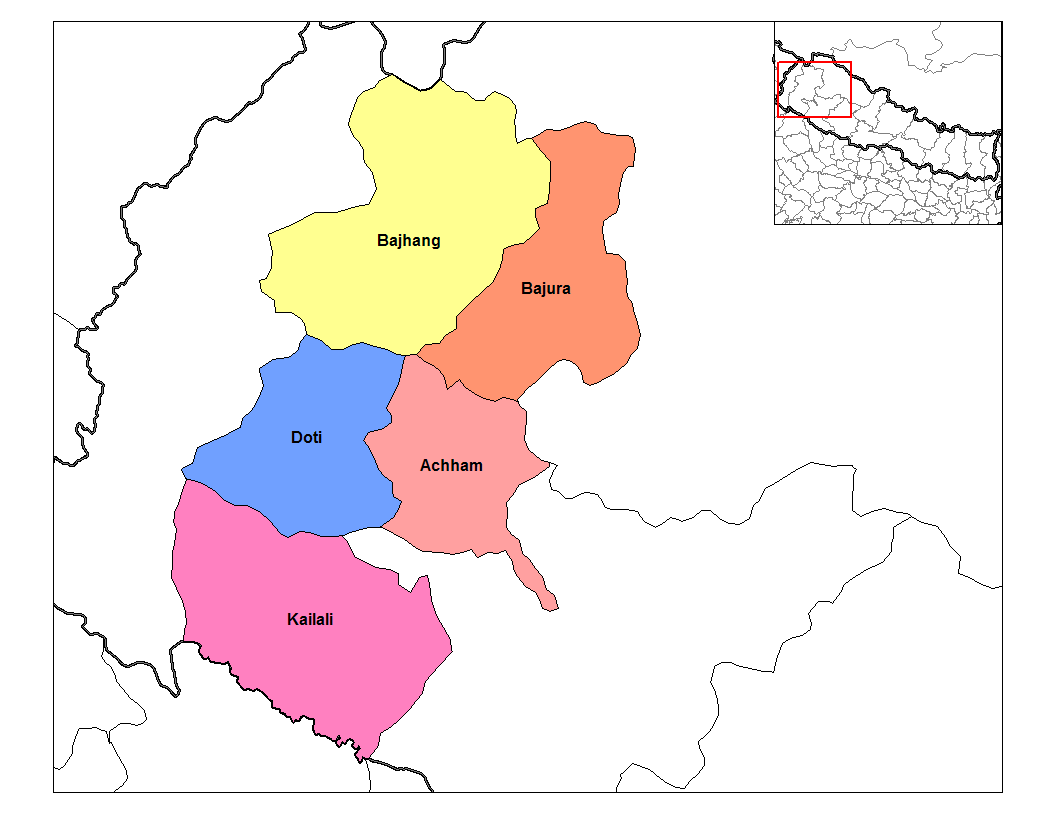
Districts of Seti

Outer Terai

Kailali District (Dhangadhi)

Hill

Achham District (Mangalsen)
Doti District (Dipayal)

Mountain

Bajhang District (Chainpur)
Bajura District (Martadi)

==== Mahakali Zone ====
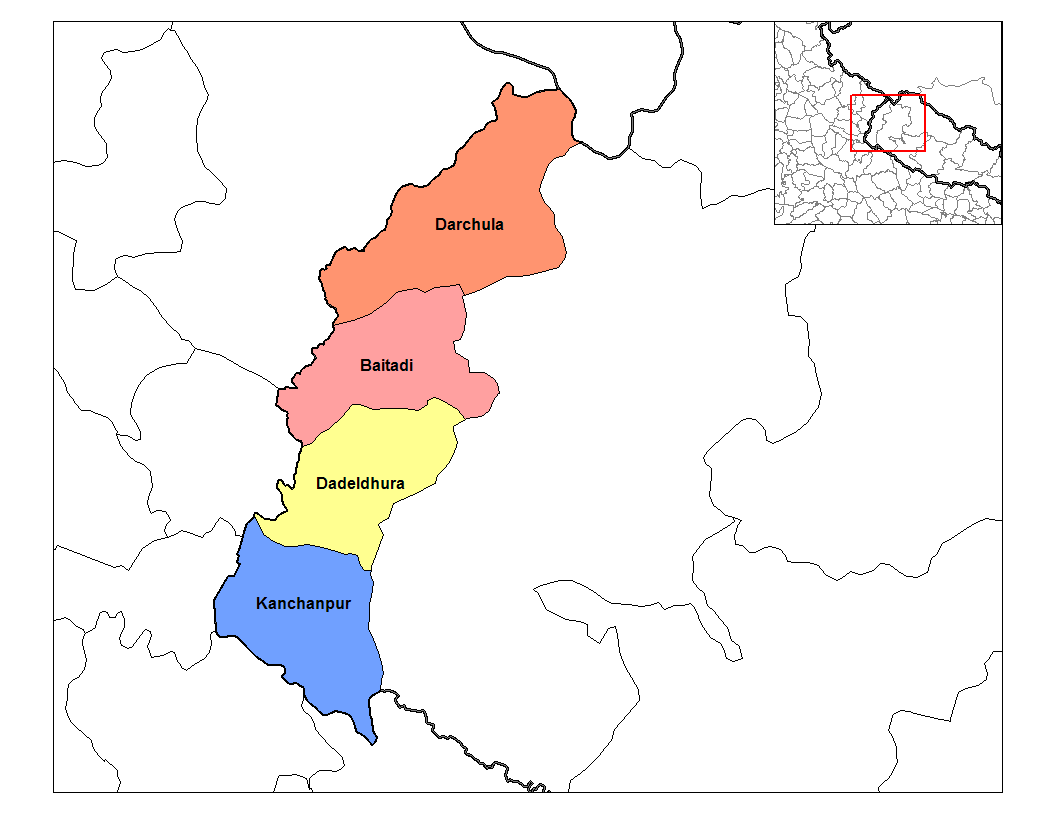
Districts of Mahakali

Outer Terai

Kanchanpur District (Bhim Datta)

Inner Terai and Hill

Dadeldhura District (Dadeldhura)

Hill

Baitadi District (Baitadi)

Mountain

Darchula District (Darchula)

== Municipalities ==
Municipalities were administrative units formed to manage urban area. Before 2014, there were 58 municipalities in Nepal:

1. Ilam
2. Bhadrapur
3. Damak
4. Mechinagar
5. Biratnagar
6. Dharan
7. Dhankuta
8. Inaruwa
9. Itahari
10. Khandbari
11. Rajbiraj
12. Lahan
13. Siraha
14. Triyuga
15. Janakpur

16. Jaleswor
17. Malangawa
18. Bhimeshwar
19. Kamalamai
20. Kathmandu
21. Lalitpur
22. Bhaktapur
23. Banepa
24. Dhulikhel
25. Bidur
26. Panauti
27. Madhyapur
28. Kirtipur
29. Birgunj
30. Hetauda

31. Kalaiya
32. Bharatpur
33. Gaur
34. Ratnanagar
35. Pokhara
36. Byasanagar
37. Prithvinarayan
38. Lekhnath
39. Waling
40. Putalibazar
41. Baglung
42. Siddharthanagar
43. Butwal
44. Tansen
45. Taulihawa

46. Ramgram
47. Tribhuwan Nagar
48. Tulsipur
49. Nepalgunj
50. Birendranagar
51. Gulariya
52. Narayan
53. Dhangadhi
54. Tikapur
55. Dipayal
56. Mahendranagar
57. Amargadhi
58. Dasharathchand

== Village Development Committees ==
Formally, villages were administered by Village Development Committees. The National Association of Village Development Committees in Nepal (NAVIN) was established in 1996 as an umbrella organization to represent and provide support to Nepal's 3915 VDCs. NAVIN was able to establish itself, both nationally and internationally, as a reputable representative organization of VDCs, and founded itself as a pioneer partner organization for decentralization and democratization process in Nepal.

The VDCs were dissolved in 2017, and reformed into gaunpalikas.

== See also ==
- Development Regions of Nepal
- List of zones of Nepal
- List of village development committees of Nepal
