= Jo Dong-gi =

Korean male boxer

Personal information
- Nationality: South Korean
- Born: 18 December 1937 (age 87)

Sport
- Sport: Boxing

Jo Dong-gi (born 18 December 1937) is a South Korean boxer. He competed in the men's flyweight event at the 1964 Summer Olympics.
