= Fernando Atzori =

Italian boxer (1942–2020)

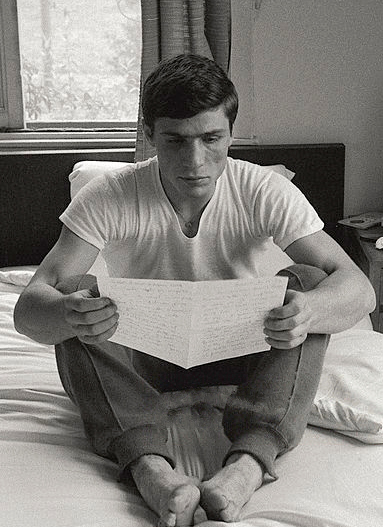
- Fernando Atzori at the 1964 Olympics

Personal information
- Nationality: Italian
- Born: 1 June 1942 Ales, Province of Oristano
- Died: 9 November 2020 (aged 78) Florence, Italy
- Height: 1.58 m (5 ft 2 in)
- Weight: Flyweight

Boxing career

Boxing record
- Total fights: 52
- Wins: 44
- Win by KO: 13
- Losses: 6
- Draws: 2
Medal record
Men's amateur boxing
Representing Italy
Olympic Games
Gold medal – first place	1964 Tokyo	Flyweight
Mediterranean Games
Gold medal – first place	1963 Naples	Flyweight

Fernando Atzori (1 June 1942 – 9 November 2020) was an Italian flyweight boxer who won a gold medal at the 1964 Olympics. In the final, he defeated Artur Olech of Poland, despite suffering an eye injury. After the Olympics, he turned professional and won the European title in 1967. Atzori defended it nine times before losing it in 1972. He then regained it and lost again in 1973. Atzori retired from the ring in 1975.

== 1964 Olympic results ==
Below are the results of Fernando Atzori, who competed for Italy as a flyweight boxer at the 1964 Olympics in Tokyo.

- Round of 32: bye
- Round of 16: defeated Darryl Norwood (Australia) on points, 5–0
- Quarterfinal: defeated John McCafferty (Ireland) on points, 5–0
- Semifinal: defeated Robert Carmody (USA) on points, 4–1
- Final: defeated Artur Olech (Poland) on points, 4–1 (won gold medal)
