= Dornești =

Dornești German: Kriegsdorf Hungarian: Hadikfalva
- Commune
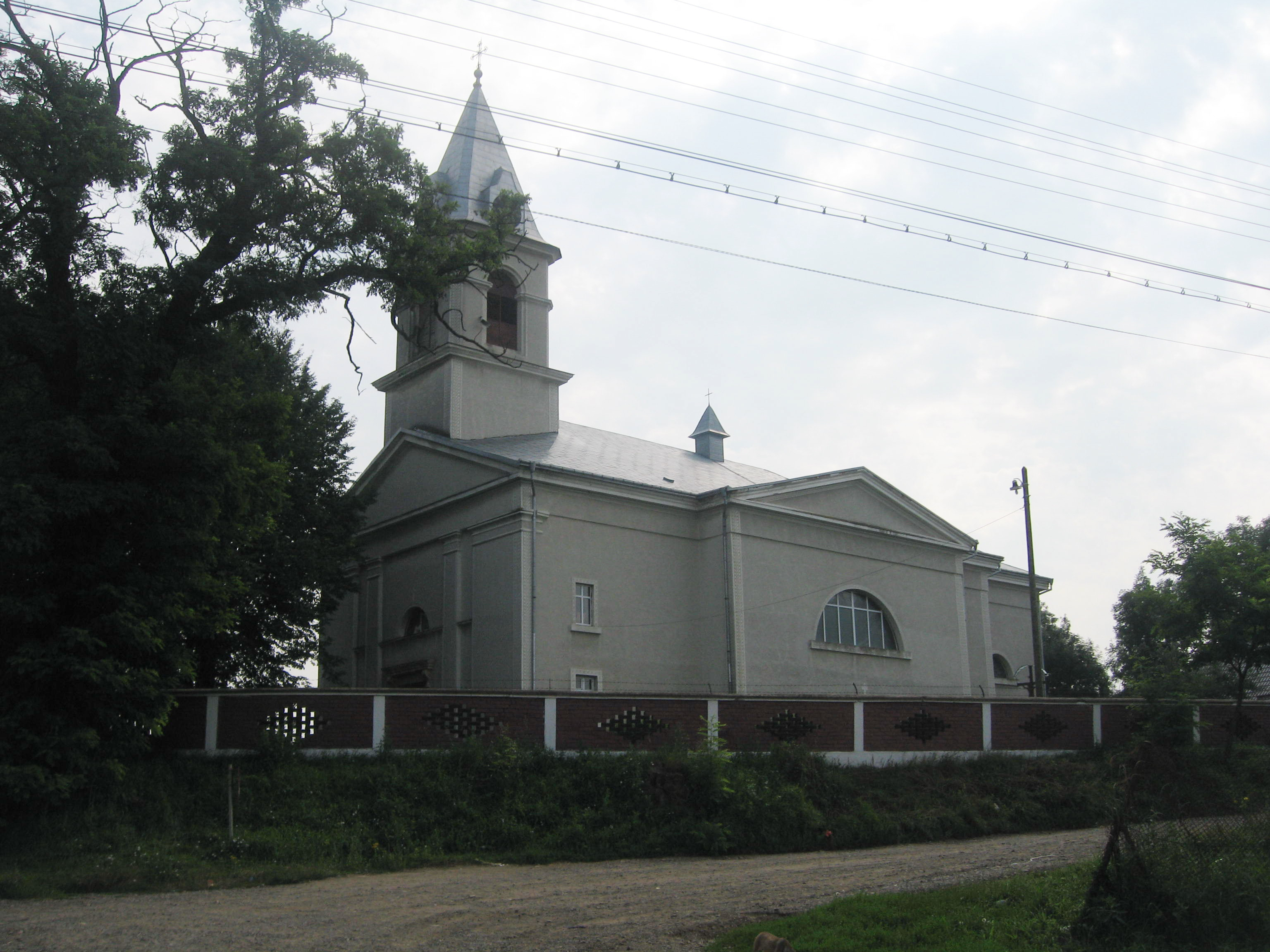
- Local church in Dornești

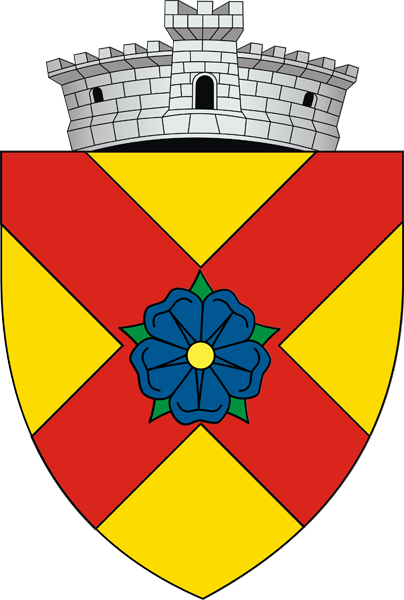
- Coat of arms

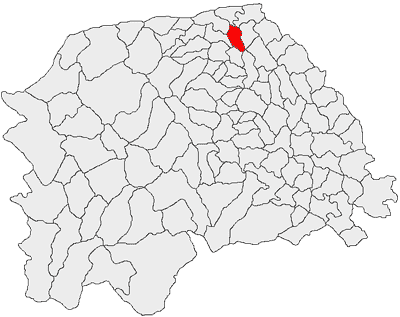
- Location in Suceava County

- Location in Romania
- Coordinates: 47°52′N 26°1′E
- Country: Romania
- County: Suceava
- Subdivisions: Dornești, Iaz

Government
  - Mayor (2024–2028): Vasile-Săndel Cazacu (PSD)
- Area: 32 km^{2} (12 sq mi)
- Elevation: 345 m (1,132 ft)
- Population (2021-12-01): 4,474
  - Density: 140/km^{2} (360/sq mi)
- Time zone: UTC+02:00 (EET)
  - Summer (DST): UTC+03:00 (EEST)
- Postal code: 727210
- Area code: (+40) x30
- Vehicle reg.: SV
- Website: primariadornesti.ro

Dornești (German: Kriegsdorf, Hungarian: Hadikfalva, popularly also known in Romanian as Hadic, a shortened form of its Hungarian name) is a commune located in Suceava County, in the historical region of Bukovina, northeastern Romania. It is composed of two villages, Dornești and Iaz. From 1786 to 1941, the village of Dornești was inhabited by the Székelys of Bukovina. In the past, the commune was also inhabited by a German minority, more specifically Bukovina Germans (German: Bukowinadeutsche or Buchenlanddeutsche). Nowadays, the vast majority of the population are ethnic Romanians (approximately 90% of the commune's population according to the 2011 Romanian census).

== History ==
Historical affiliations

Moldavia (1388–1775)
Habsburg Monarchy (1775–1804)
Austrian Empire (1804–1867)
Austria-Hungary, Cisleithania (1867–1918)
Kingdom of Romania (1918–1947)
Romanian People's Republic (1947–1965)
Socialist Republic of Romania (1965–1989)
Romania (1989–present)

As it is the case of other rural settlements from Suceava County, Dornești (Hungarian: Hadikfalva, German: Kriegsdorf) was previously inhabited by a small German community, more specifically by Bukovina Germans (German: Bukowinadetusche or Buchenlanddeutsche) during the modern period up until the mid 20th century, starting as early as the Habsburg period and, later on, the Austro-Hungarian period. However, the main ethnic group of the commune was that of the Székelys of Bukovina well into the times of the Kingdom of Romania.

At the 1930 Romanian census, the Székelys of Dornești accounted for 91.9% of the commune's population Both the Romanians and the Germans amounted to 2.63% each. Other smaller ethnic groups registered at the time in the commune included Jews (1.72%) and Poles (0.93%). In addition, the vast majority of the inhabitants of Dornești were Roman Catholic.

== Administration and local politics ==
=== Communal council ===
The commune's current local council has the following political composition, according to the results of the 2020 Romanian local elections:

Party	Seats	Current Council
National Liberal Party (PNL)	5	
Social Democratic Party (PSD)	4	
PRO Romania (PRO)	3	
Union for Bucovina (UpB)	1	

== Natives ==
- Damaschin Dorneanul – Vicar-Bishop of the Archdiocese of Suceava and Rădăuți
- Tamás Menyhért – Hungarian writer

== Gallery ==
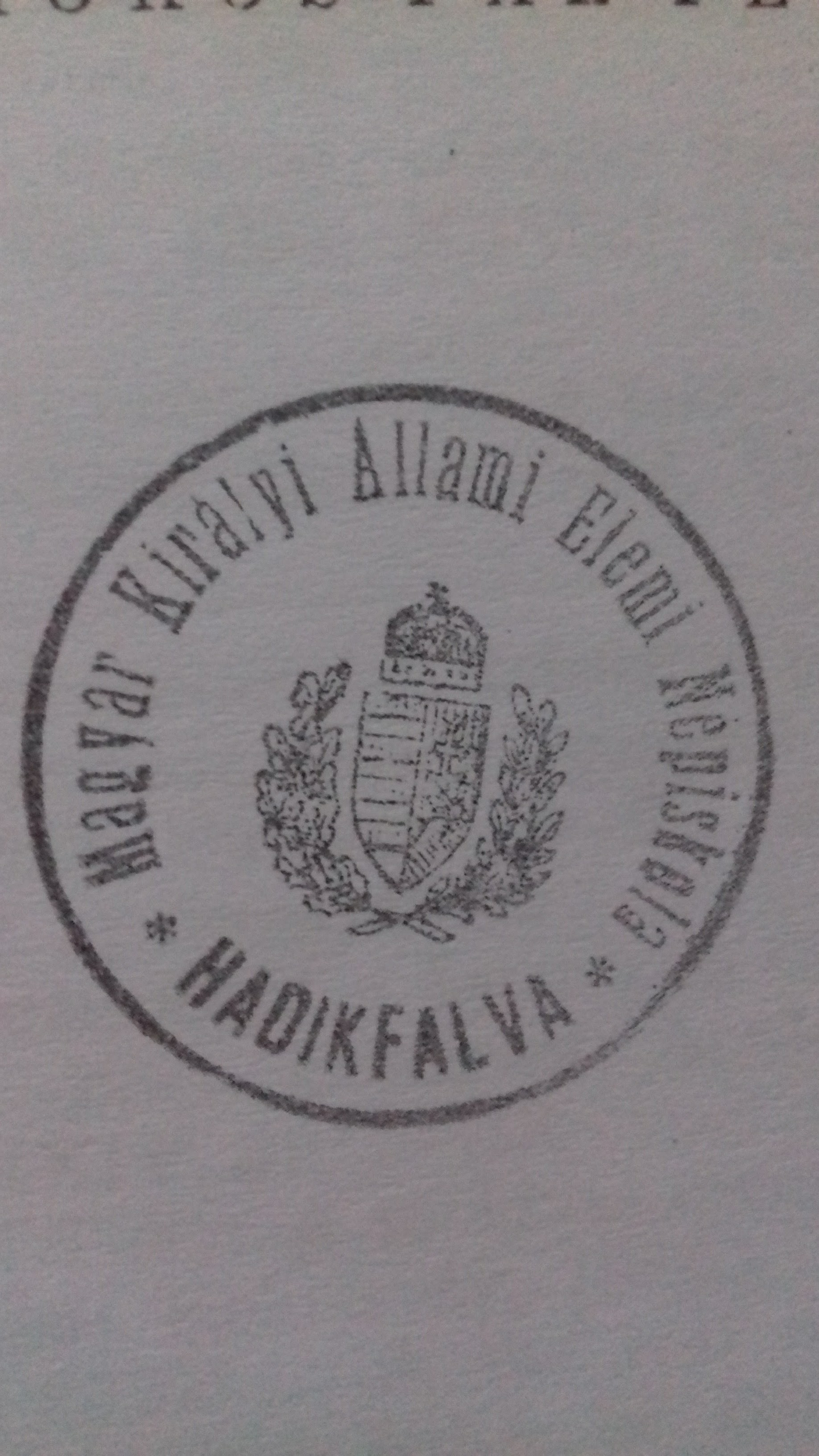
Hadikfalva public school stamp for a Hungarian-language school in Dornești, issued during Austro-Hungarian times, with the coat of arms of the Kingdom of Hungary depicted in the middle

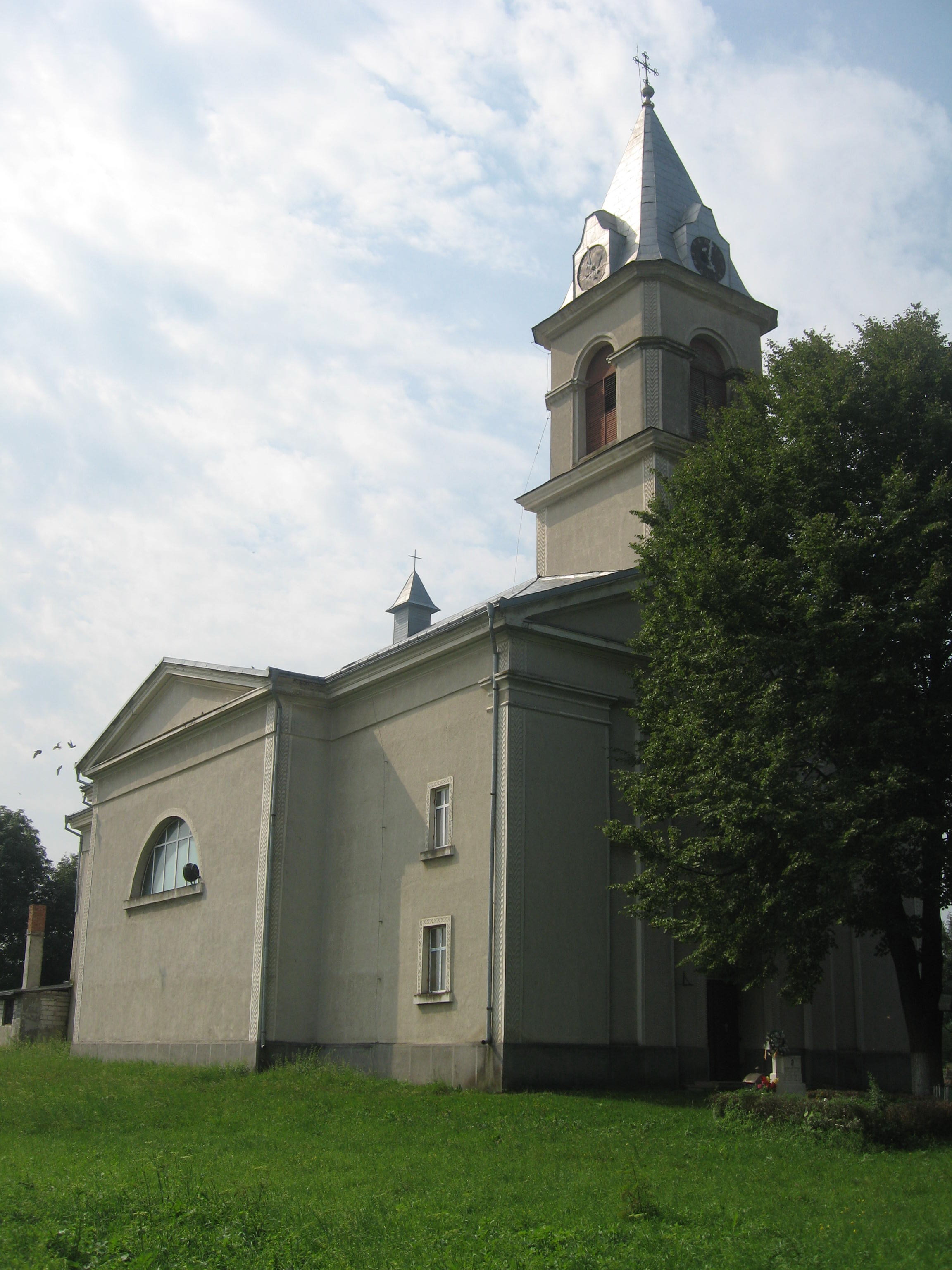
Church of the Assumption of Virgin Mary in Dornești

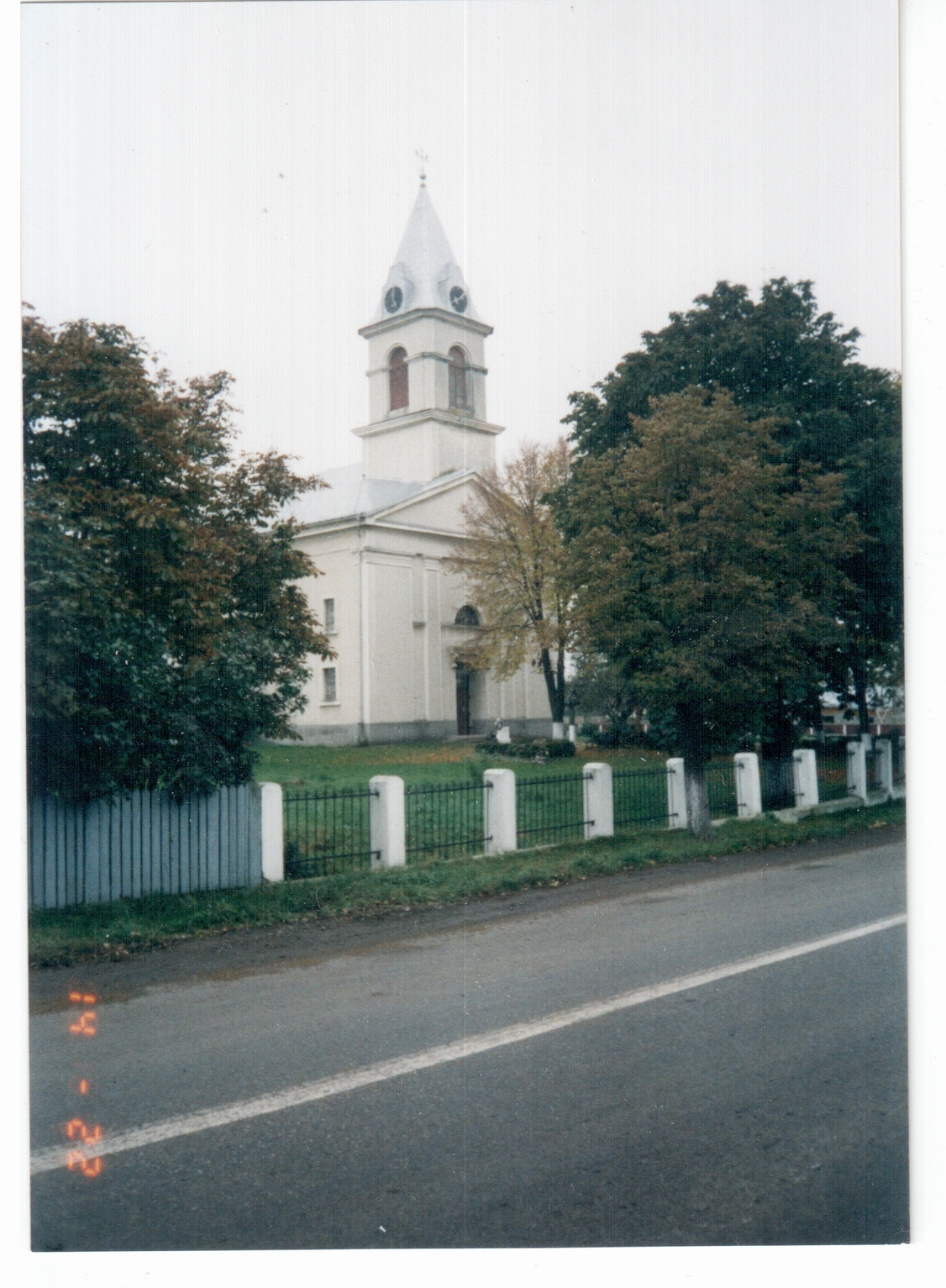
Church of the Assumption of Virgin Mary in Dornești

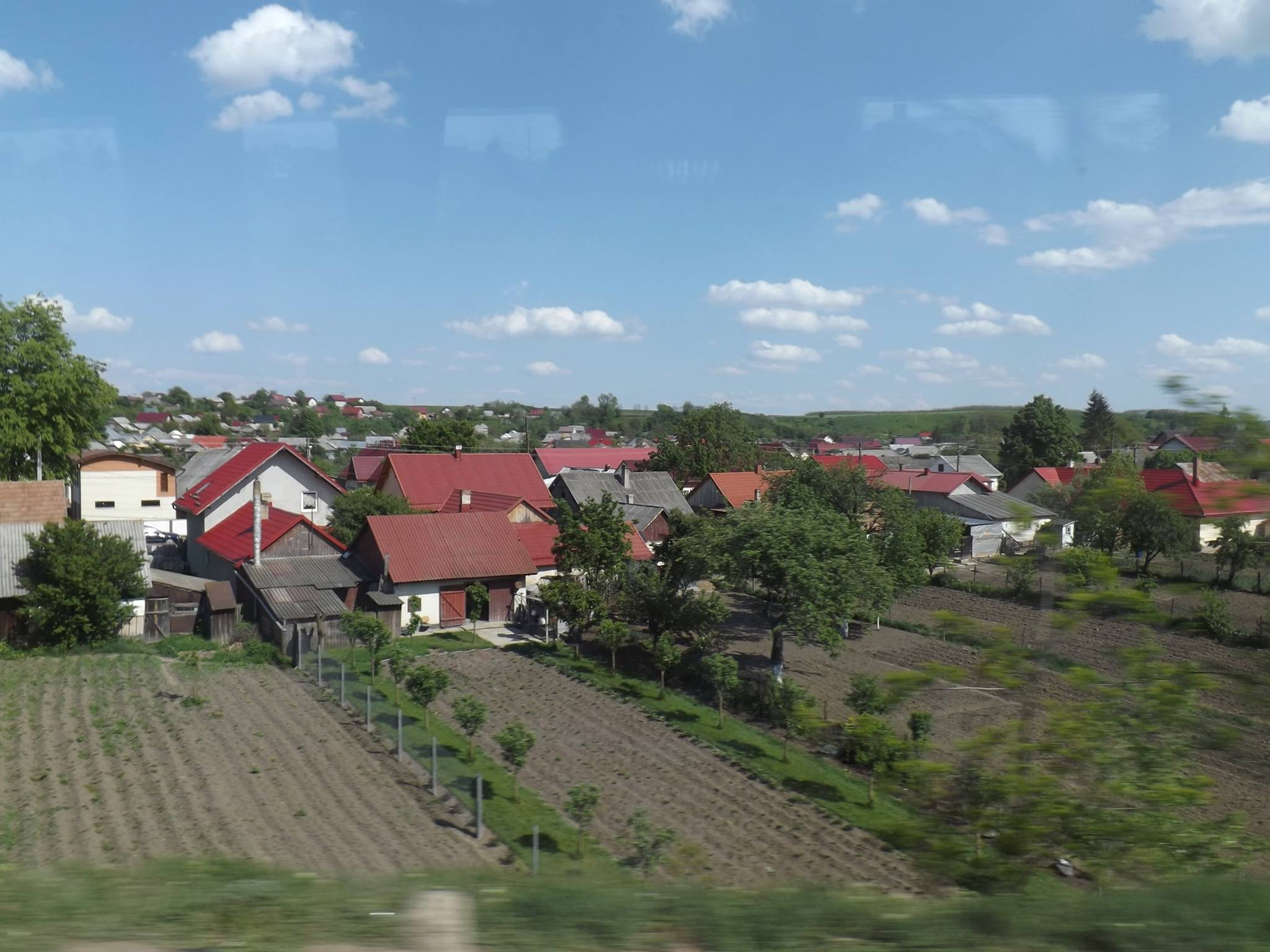
Dornești commune, Suceava County, Bukovina, northeastern Romania
