= Artur Olech =

Polish boxer

Medal record

Men's Boxing

Representing Poland

Olympic Games
Silver medal – second place	1964 Tokyo	Flyweight
Silver medal – second place	1968 Mexico City	Flyweight

European Amateur Championships
Bronze medal – third place	Bucharest 1969	Flyweight

Artur Olech (22 June 1940 – 12 August 2010) was a Polish boxer. He was born in Lviv, Ukrainian SSR, Soviet Union and died in Wroclaw, Poland.

Olech won two silver medals at the Olympic Games, in 1964 in Tokyo and 1968 in Mexico City.

== 1964 Olympic results ==
Below are the results of Artur Olech who competed for Poland as a flyweight boxer at the 1964 Tokyo Olympics:

- Round of 32: defeated Stefan Panayotov (Bulgaria) on points, 3-2
- Round of 16: defeated John Kamau (Kenya) on points, 5-0
- Quarterfinal: defeated Constantin Ciuca (Romania) on points, 5-0
- Semifinal: defeated Stanislav Sorokin (Soviet Union); Sorokin did not start
- Final: lost to Fernando Atzori (Italy) on points, 1-4 (was awarded silver medal)
