= Tokorozawa Shooting Range =

Firing range in Tokorozawa, Japan

Coordinates: 35.814351°N 139.524597°E

The Tokorozawa Shooting Range is a firing range located in Tokorozawa, Saitama, Japan. It hosted the trap shooting part of the shooting events for the 1964 Summer Olympics in neighboring Tokyo.
