= 1964 Summer Olympics =

Multi-sport event in Tokyo, Japan

Games of the XVIII Olympiad
- Emblem of the 1964 Summer Olympics
- Location: Tokyo, Japan
- Nations: 93
- Athletes: 5,137 (4,457 men, 680 women)
- Events: 163 in 19 sports (25 disciplines)
- Opening: 10 October 1964
- Closing: 24 October 1964
- Opened by: Emperor Showa
- Closed by: IOC president Avery Brundage
- Cauldron: Yoshinori Sakai
- Stadium: National Stadium

The 1964 Summer Olympics, (Note: Japanese: 1964年夏季オリンピック, Hepburn: 1964-Nen Kaki Orinpikku) officially the Games of the XVIII Olympiad (Note: Japanese: 第18回オリンピック競技大会, Hepburn: Dai Jūhachi-kai Orinpikku Kyōgi Taikai) and commonly known as Tokyo 1964, (Note: Japanese: 東京1964) were an international multi-sport event held from 10 to 24 October 1964 in Tokyo, Japan. Tokyo had been awarded the organization of the 1940 Summer Olympics, but this honor was subsequently passed to Helsinki due to Japan's invasion of China, before ultimately being cancelled due to World War II. The 1964 Summer Olympics in Tokyo were the first Olympic Games held in the city and, as of 2021, the only ones to have spectators, as the 2020 Summer Olympics in Tokyo were conducted without spectators due to the COVID-19 pandemic. Tokyo was chosen as the host city during the 55th IOC Session in West Germany (modern day Germany) on 26 May 1959.

The 1964 Summer Games were the first Olympics held in Asia, and marked the first time South Africa was excluded for using its apartheid system in sports. Until 1960, South Africa had fielded segregated teams, conforming to the country's racial classifications; for the 1964 Games the International Olympic Committee demanded a multi-racial delegation to be sent, and after South Africa refused, they were excluded from participating. The country was, however, allowed to compete at the 1964 Summer Paralympics, also held in Tokyo, its Paralympic Games debut.

The 1964 Games were also the first to be telecast internationally without the need for tapes to be flown overseas, as they had been for the 1960 Olympics four years earlier. The games were telecast to the United States using Syncom 3, the first geostationary communication satellite, and from there to Europe using Relay 1. These were also the first Olympic Games to have color telecasts, albeit partially. Certain events such as the sumo wrestling and judo matches, sports popular in Japan, were tried out using Toshiba's new colour transmission system, but only for the domestic market. The entire 1964 Olympic Games was chronicled in the ground-breaking 1965 sports documentary film Tokyo Olympiad, directed by Kon Ichikawa.

The games were scheduled for mid-October to avoid the city's midsummer heat and humidity and the September typhoon season. The previous Olympics in Rome in 1960 started in late August and experienced hot weather. The following games in 1968 in Mexico City also began in October. The 1964 Olympics were also the last to use a traditional cinder track for the track events. Since 1968, a smooth, synthetic, all-weather track has been used. The United States topped the gold medal table at these Games, while the Soviet Union won the most medals overall.

In 2021, due to delay over the COVID-19 pandemic, Tokyo hosted the 2020 Summer Olympics, making it the first city in Asia to host the Summer Olympic Games twice. Japan also hosted the Winter Olympics twice with the Sapporo 1972 and Nagano 1998 games.

== Host city selection ==
Tokyo won the rights to the Games on 26 May 1959 at the 55th IOC Session in Munich, West Germany, over bids from Detroit, Brussels and Vienna.

Toronto was an early bidder again in 1964 after the failed attempt for 1960 and failed to make the final round.

1964 Summer Olympics bidding result
City	Country	Round 1
Tokyo	Japan	34
Detroit	United States	10
Vienna	Austria	9
Brussels	Belgium	5

== Highlights ==
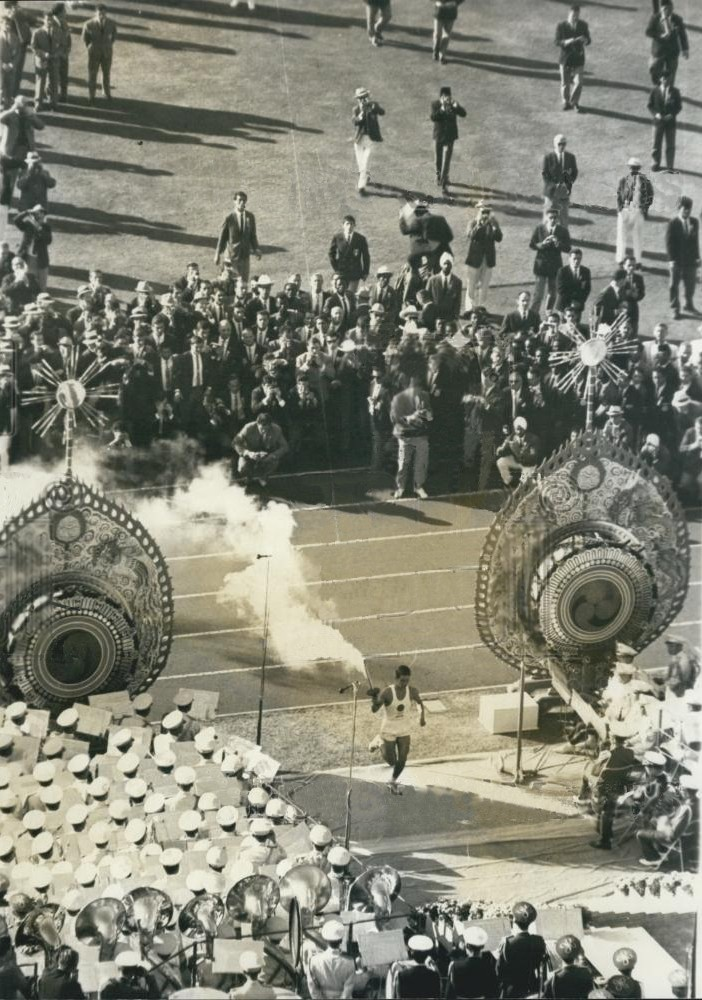
Yoshinori Sakai running toward the Olympic cauldron.

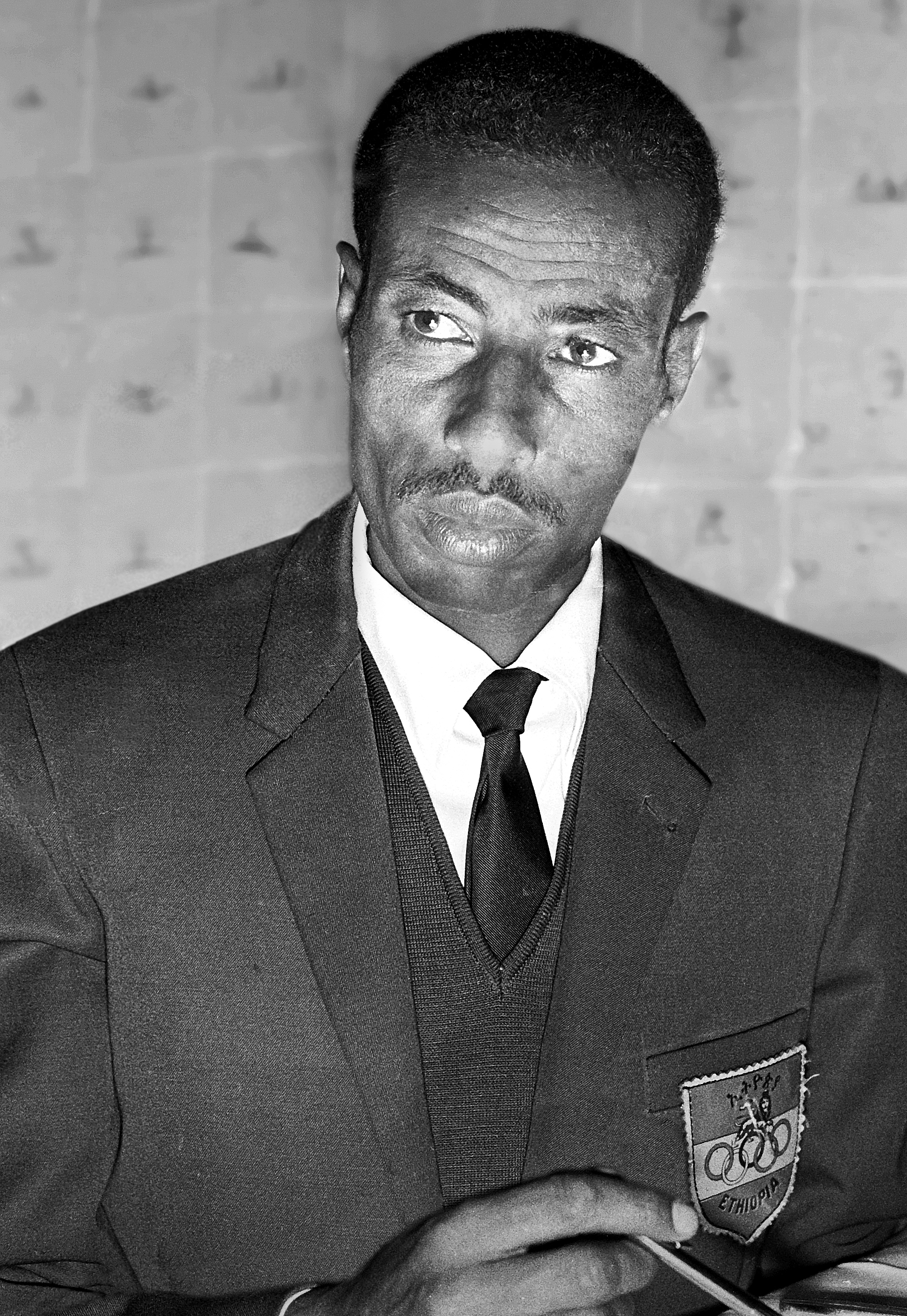
Marathon winner Abebe Bikila of Ethiopia

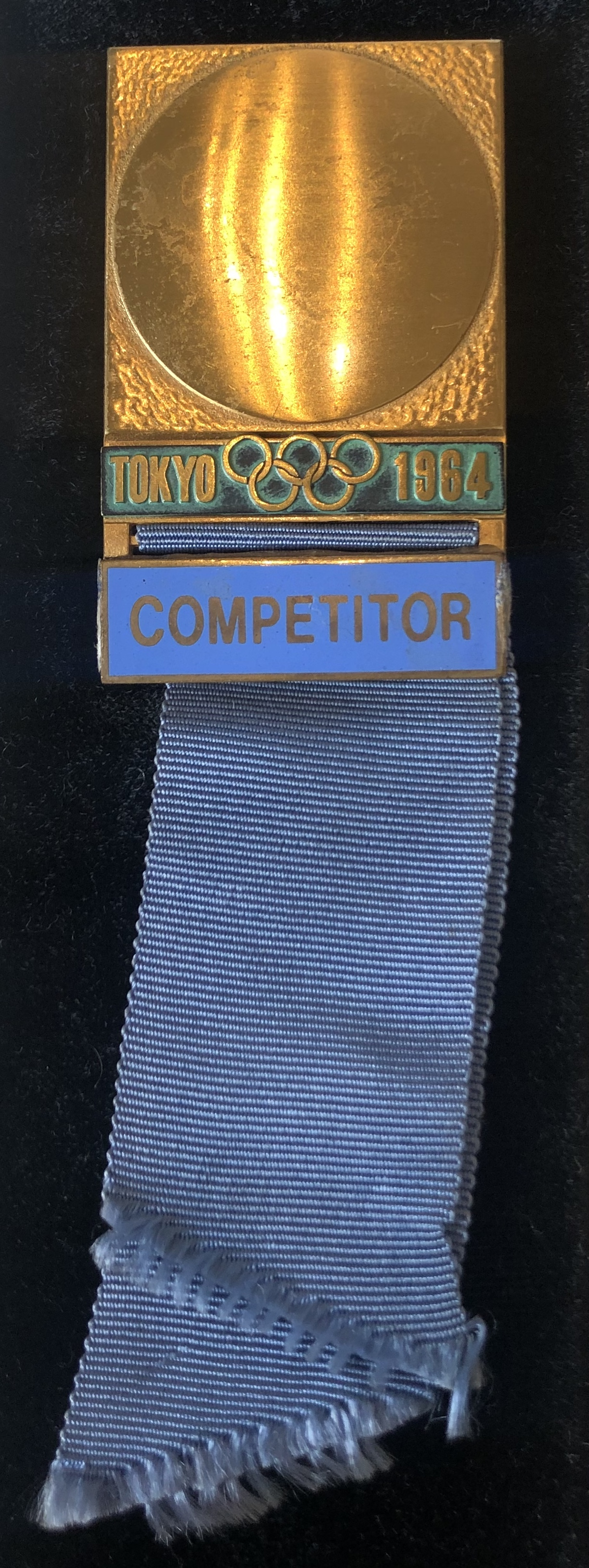
Competitor medal awarded to Irish yachtsman Eddie Kelliher at the games

- Yūji Koseki composed the theme song of the opening ceremony.
- Yoshinori Sakai, who lit the Olympic flame, was born in Hiroshima on 6 August 1945, the day an atomic bomb was dropped on that city. He was chosen for the role to symbolize Japan's postwar reconstruction and peace.
- Kumi-daiko was first exhibited to a worldwide audience at the Festival of Arts presentation.
- Judo and volleyball, both popular sports in Japan, were introduced to the Olympics. Japan won gold medals in three judo events, but Dutchman Anton Geesink won the Open category, defeating Akio Kaminaga in front of his home crowd. The Japanese women's volleyball team won the gold medal, with the final being broadcast live.
- The women's pentathlon (shot put, high jump, hurdling, sprint and long jump) was introduced to the athletics events.
- Reigning world champion Osamu Watanabe capped off his career with a gold medal for Japan in freestyle wrestling, surrendering no points and retiring from competition as the only undefeated Olympic champion to date at 189–0.
- Soviet gymnast Larisa Latynina won two gold medals, a silver medal and two bronze medals. She had held the record for most Olympic medals at 18 (nine gold, five silver, four bronze) which stood until broken by American swimmer Michael Phelps in 2012.
- Czechoslovak gymnast Věra Čáslavská won three gold medals, including the individual all-around competition, crowning her the new queen over the reigning champion Larisa Latynina.
- Australian swimmer Dawn Fraser won the 100 m freestyle event for the third time in a row, a feat matched by Soviet Vyacheslav Ivanov in rowing's single scull event.
- Don Schollander won four gold medals in swimming.
- Abebe Bikila (Ethiopia) became the first person to win the Olympic marathon twice.
- 15-year-old Sharon Stouder won four medals in women's swimming, three of them gold.
- New Zealand's Peter Snell became the third person (after British Albert Hill in 1920 and Australian Edwin Flack in 1896) to win gold medals in both the 800 m and 1500 m in the same Olympics.
- Billy Mills, an unfancied runner, became the only American, as well as the first Native American, to win the gold in the men's 10,000 m.
- Bob Hayes won the 100 metre title in a time of 10.06 seconds, equaling the world record, and set the current record for the fastest relay leg in the 4×100 m.
- Joe Frazier, future heavyweight champion of the world, won a gold medal in heavyweight boxing while competing with a broken thumb.
- This was the last Summer Olympics to use a cinder running track for athletic events, and the first to use fiberglass poles for pole vaulting.
- Zambia declared its independence on the day of the closing ceremony of the 1964 Summer Olympics, thereby becoming the first country ever to have entered an Olympic Games as one country, and left it as another. This was celebrated in the ceremony itself by the team using a placard with "Zambia" instead of the "Northern Rhodesia" placard from the opening ceremony. Zambia was the only team to use a placard in the closing ceremony.
- The start of operations for the first Japanese "bullet train" (the Tōkaidō Shinkansen) between Tokyo Station and Shin-Ōsaka Station was scheduled to coincide with the Olympic Games. The first regularly scheduled train ran on 1 October 1964, just nine days before the opening of the games, transporting passengers 515 kilometres or 320 miles in about four hours, and connecting the three major metropolitan areas of Tokyo, Nagoya, and Osaka.
- Ranatunge Karunananda who represented Ceylon in men's 10,000 meters, continued to run alone even after the others had finished the race. Spectators first started to jeer at him. But when he came around a second time, there was silence. Finally he finished the race amid cheers and applause. Karunananda's Olympic story has been entered into Japanese school textbooks titled 'Uniform Number 67', 'Bottom Ranked Hero'.

== Sports ==
The 1964 Summer Olympics featured 19 different sports encompassing 25 disciplines, and medals were awarded in 163 events. In the list below, the number of events in each discipline is noted in parentheses.

- Aquatics
  - Diving (4)
  - Swimming (18)
  - Water polo (1)
- Athletics (36)
- Basketball (1)
- Boxing (10)
- Canoeing (7)
- Cycling
  - Road (2)
  - Track (5)
- Equestrian
  - Dressage (2)
  - Eventing (2)
  - Jumping (2)
- Fencing (8)
- Field hockey (1)
- Football (1)
- Gymnastics (14)
- Judo (4)
- Modern pentathlon (2)
- Rowing (7)
- Sailing (5)
- Shooting (6)
- Volleyball (2)
- Weightlifting (7)
- Wrestling
  - Freestyle (8)
  - Greco-Roman (8)

Note: In the Japan Olympic Committee report, sailing is listed as "yachting".

Demonstration sports

- Baseball
- Budō (kyūdō, sumo, kendo)

== Medal count ==
Rank	Nation	Gold	Silver	Bronze	Total
1	United States	36	26	28	90
2	Soviet Union	30	31	35	96
3	Japan*	16	5	8	29
4	United Team of Germany	10	22	18	50
5	Italy	10	10	7	27
6	Hungary	10	7	5	22
7	Poland	7	6	10	23
8	Australia	6	2	10	18
9	Czechoslovakia	5	6	3	14
10	Great Britain	4	12	2	18
Totals (10 entries)		134	127	126	387

Conventionally, countries are ranked by the number of gold medals they receive, followed then by the number of silver medals and, finally, bronze.

== Participating National Olympic Committees ==
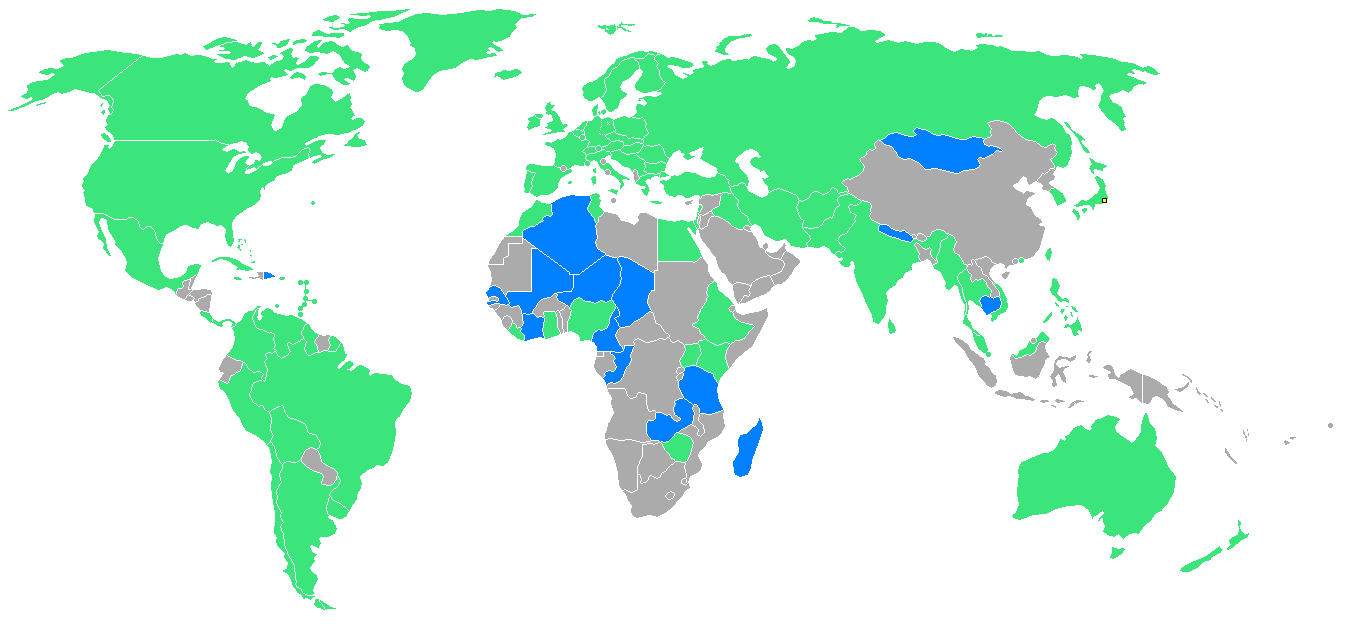
Participants

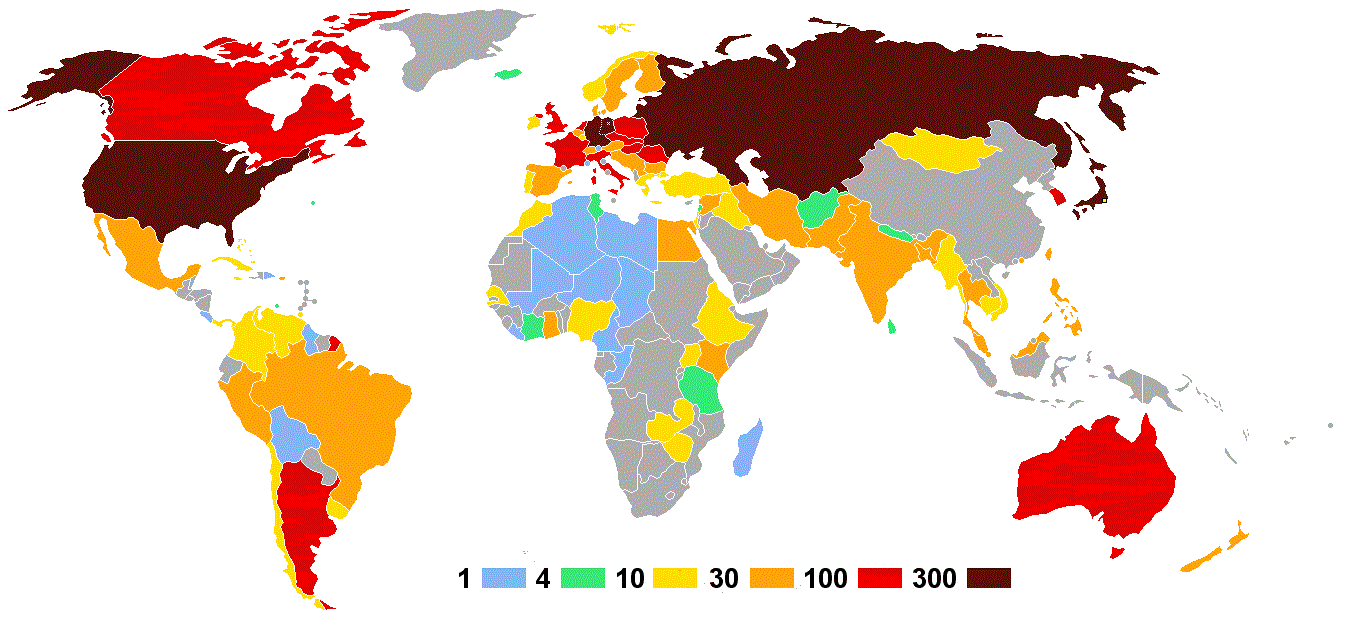
Number of athletes per country

Ninety-four nations participated in the 1964 Games. Sixteen nations made their first Olympic appearance in Tokyo: Algeria, Cameroon, Chad, Congo, Côte d'Ivoire (as Ivory Coast), Dominican Republic, Libya (but it withdrew before the competition), Madagascar, Malaysia, Mali, Mongolia, Nepal, Niger, Northern Rhodesia, Senegal, and Tanzania (as Tanganyika). Malaysia previously competed as Malaya.

Cambodia returned to compete in Olympics after being absent in the 1960 Summer Olympics, but competed in all events despite having only competed in equestrian event in the 1956 Summer Olympics in Stockholm, Sweden.

Northern Rhodesia achieved full independence as Zambia on the same day as the closing ceremony. Athletes from Southern Rhodesia competed under the banner of Rhodesia; this was the last of three appearances at the Summer Olympics by a Rhodesian representation. Zimbabwe would later make its first appearance at the 1980 Summer Olympics.

Athletes from East Germany and West Germany competed together as the United Team of Germany, as they had done previously in 1956 and 1960. The nations would enter separate teams beginning with the 1968 Winter Olympics.

Indonesia was banned from the 1964 Olympics, due to its refusal to allow Israeli and Taiwanese athletes visas at the 1962 Asian Games. Indonesia was originally banned on the meeting which took place in Lausanne on 7 February 1963. The decision was changed on 26 June 1964 citing the changed position of the Government of Indonesia towards the Tokyo games.

Participating National Olympic Committees
- Afghanistan (8)
- Algeria (1)
- Argentina (102)
- Australia (243)
- Austria (56)
- Bahamas (11)
- Belgium (61)
- Bermuda (4)
- Bolivia (1)
- Brazil (61)
- Bulgaria (63)
- Burma (11)
- Cambodia (13)
- Cameroon (1)
- Canada (115)
- Ceylon (6)
- Chad (2)
- Chile (14)
- Colombia (20)
- Republic of the Congo (2)
- Costa Rica (2)
- Cuba (27)
- Czechoslovakia (104)
- Denmark (60)
- Dominican Republic (1)
- Egypt (73)
- Ethiopia (12)
- Finland (89)
- France (138)
- Ghana (33)
- Great Britain (204)
- Greece (18)
- Guyana (1)
- Hong Kong (39)
- Hungary (182)
- Iceland (4)
- India (53)
- Iran (62)
- Iraq (13)
- Ireland (25)
- Israel (10)
- Italy (168)
- Ivory Coast (9)
- Jamaica (21)
- Japan (328) (host)
- Kenya (37)
- Lebanon (5)
- Liberia (1)
- Liechtenstein (2)
- Luxembourg (12)
- Madagascar (3)
- Malaysia (61)
- Mali (2)
- Mexico (94)
- Monaco (1)
- Mongolia (21)
- Morocco (20)
- Nepal (6)
- Netherlands (125)
- Netherlands Antilles (4)
- New Zealand (64)
- Niger (1)
- Nigeria (18)
- Northern Rhodesia (12)
- Norway (26)
- Pakistan (41)
- Panama (10)
- Peru (31)
- Philippines (47)
- Poland (140)
- Portugal (20)
- Puerto Rico (32)
- Rhodesia (29)
- Romania (138)
- Senegal (12)
- South Korea (154)
- Soviet Union (317)
- Spain (51)
- Sweden (94)
- Switzerland (66)
- Taiwan (40)
- Tanganyika (4)
- Thailand (54)
- Trinidad and Tobago (13)
- Tunisia (9)
- Turkey (23)
- Uganda (13)
- United States (346)
- United Team of Germany (337)
- Uruguay (23)
- Venezuela (16)
- Vietnam (16)
- Yugoslavia (75)

- Libya also took part in the Opening Ceremony, but its lone athlete (a marathon runner) withdrew from competition.

=== Number of athletes by National Olympic Committees ===
IOC Letter Code	Country	Athletes
USA	United States	346
EUA	United Team of Germany	337
JPN	Japan	328
URS	Soviet Union	317
AUS	Australia	243
GBR	Great Britain	204
HUN	Hungary	182
ITA	Italy	168
KOR	South Korea	154
POL	Poland	140
FRA	France	138
ROU	Romania	138
NED	Netherlands	125
CAN	Canada	115
CZS	Czechoslovakia	104
ARG	Argentina	102
MEX	Mexico	94
SWE	Sweden	94
FIN	Finland	89
YUG	Yugoslavia	75
EGY	Egypt	73
SUI	Switzerland	66
NZL	New Zealand	64
BUL	Bulgaria	63
IRN	Iran	62
BEL	Belgium	61
BRA	Brazil	61
MAS	Malaysia	61
DEN	Denmark	60
AUT	Austria	56
THA	Thailand	54
IND	India	53
SPA	Spain	51
PHI	Philippines	47
PAK	Pakistan	41
TWN	Taiwan	40
HKG	Hong Kong	39
KEN	Kenya	37
GHA	Ghana	33
PUR	Puerto Rico	32
PER	Peru	31
RHO	Rhodesia	29
CUB	Cuba	27
NOR	Norway	26
IRL	Ireland	25
TUR	Turkey	23
URU	Uruguay	23
JAM	Jamaica	21
MGL	Mongolia	21
COL	Colombia	20
MAR	Morocco	20
POR	Portugal	20
GRE	Greece	18
NGR	Nigeria	18
VEN	Venezuela	16
VIE	Vietnam	16
CHI	Chile	14
CAM	Cambodia	13
IRQ	Iraq	13
TRI	Trinidad and Tobago	13
UGA	Uganda	13
ETH	Ethiopia	12
LUX	Luxembourg	12
NRH	Northern Rhodesia	12
SEN	Senegal	12
BAH	Bahamas	11
BIR	Burma	11
ISR	Israel	10
PAN	Panama	10
CIV	Ivory Coast	9
TUN	Tunisia	9
AFG	Afghanistan	8
CEY	Ceylon	6
NEP	Nepal	6
LIB	Lebanon	5
BER	Bermuda	4
ISL	Iceland	4
NAN	Netherlands Antilles	4
TAG	Tanganyika	4
MAD	Madagascar	3
CHA	Chad	2
CGO	Republic of the Congo	2
CRC	Costa Rica	2
LIE	Liechtenstein	2
MLI	Mali	2
AGR	Algeria	1
BOL	Bolivia	1
CMR	Cameroon	1
DOM	Dominican Republic	1
GUY	Guyana	1
LBR	Liberia	1
MON	Monaco	1
NGR	Niger	1
Total		5,137

== Calendar ==
All dates are in Japan Standard Time (UTC+9)

OC	Opening ceremony	●	Event competitions	1	Gold medal events	CC	Closing ceremony

October 1964		10th Sat	11th Sun	12th Mon	13th Tue	14th Wed	15th Thu	16th Fri	17th Sat	18th Sun	19th Mon	20th Tue	21st Wed	22nd Thu	23rd Fri	24th Sat	Events
Ceremonies		OC														CC	—N/a
Aquatics	Diving		●	1	●	●	1	1	●	●	1						23
Aquatics	Swimming		●	2	2	3	3	2	2	4							23
Aquatics	Water polo		●	●	●	●	●		●	1							23
Athletics						3	4	5	6	5	4	3	6				36
Basketball			●	●	●	●		●	●	●		●	●	●	1		1
Boxing			●	●	●	●	●	●	●	●	●	●	●		10		10
Canoeing												●	●	7			7
Cycling	Road cycling					1								1			7
Cycling	Track cycling							1	1	1		2					7
Equestrian								●	●	●	2		●	●	2	2	6
Fencing					●	1	1	1	1	●	1	1	1	●	1		8
Field hockey			●	●	●	●	●	●	●	●	●		●	●	1		1
Football			●	●	●	●	●	●		●		●			1		1
Gymnastics										●	●	2	2	5	5		14
Judo												1	1	1	1		4
Modern pentathlon			●	●	●	●	2										2
Rowing			●	●	●	●	7										7
Sailing				●	●	●	●				●	●	5				5
Shooting							1	1	1	1	1	1					6
Volleyball			●	●	●	●	●		●	●	●		●	●	2		2
Weightlifting			1	1	1	1		1	1	1							7
Wrestling			●	●	●	8		●	●	●	8						16
Daily medal events			1	4	3	17	19	12	12	13	17	10	15	14	24	2	163
Cumulative total			1	5	8	25	44	56	68	81	98	108	123	137	161	163	163
October 1964		10th Sat	11th Sun	12th Mon	13th Tue	14th Wed	15th Thu	16th Fri	17th Sat	18th Sun	19th Mon	20th Tue	21st Wed	22nd Thu	23rd Fri	24th Sat	Total events

== Venues ==
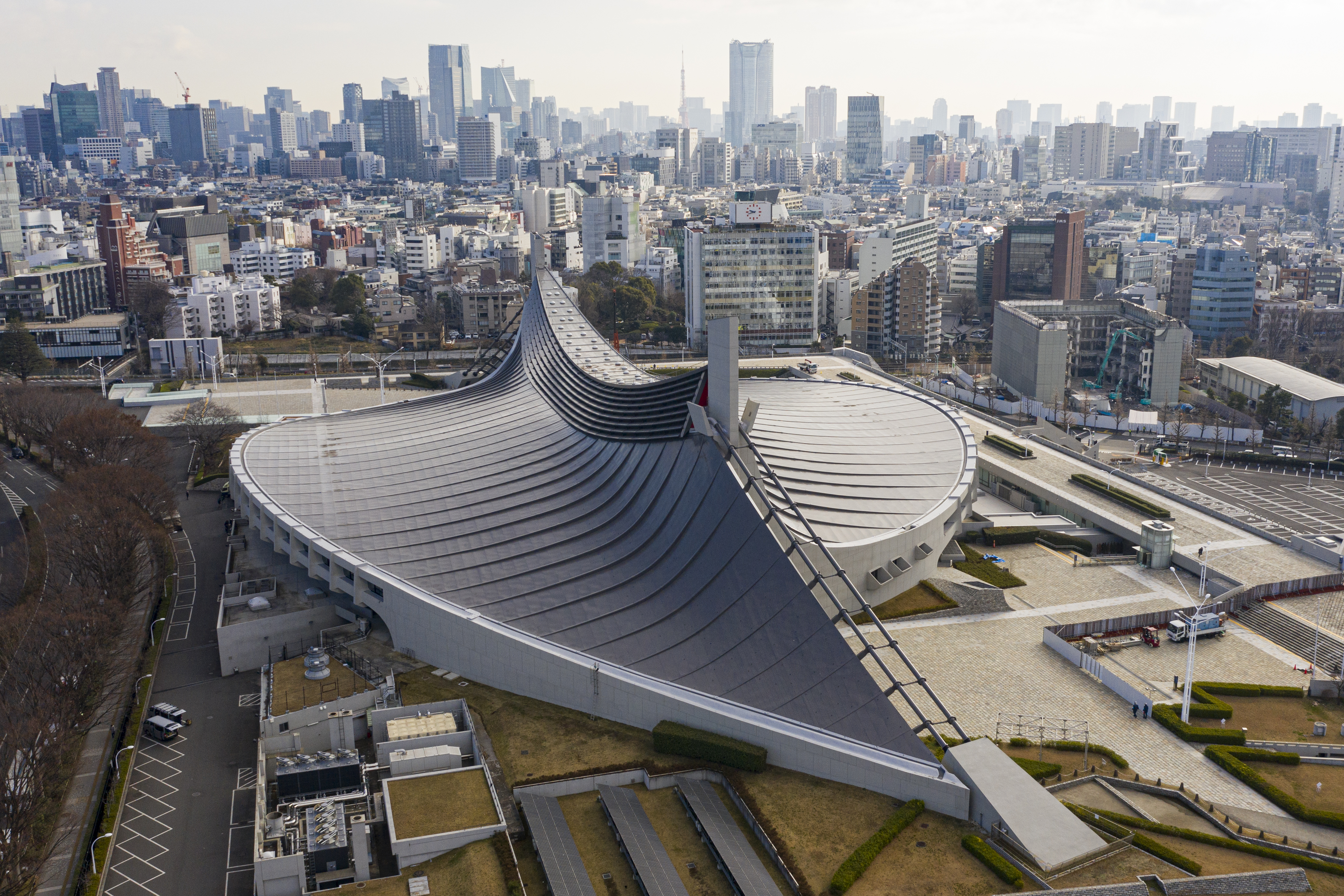
Yoyogi National Gymnasium, designed by Kenzo Tange

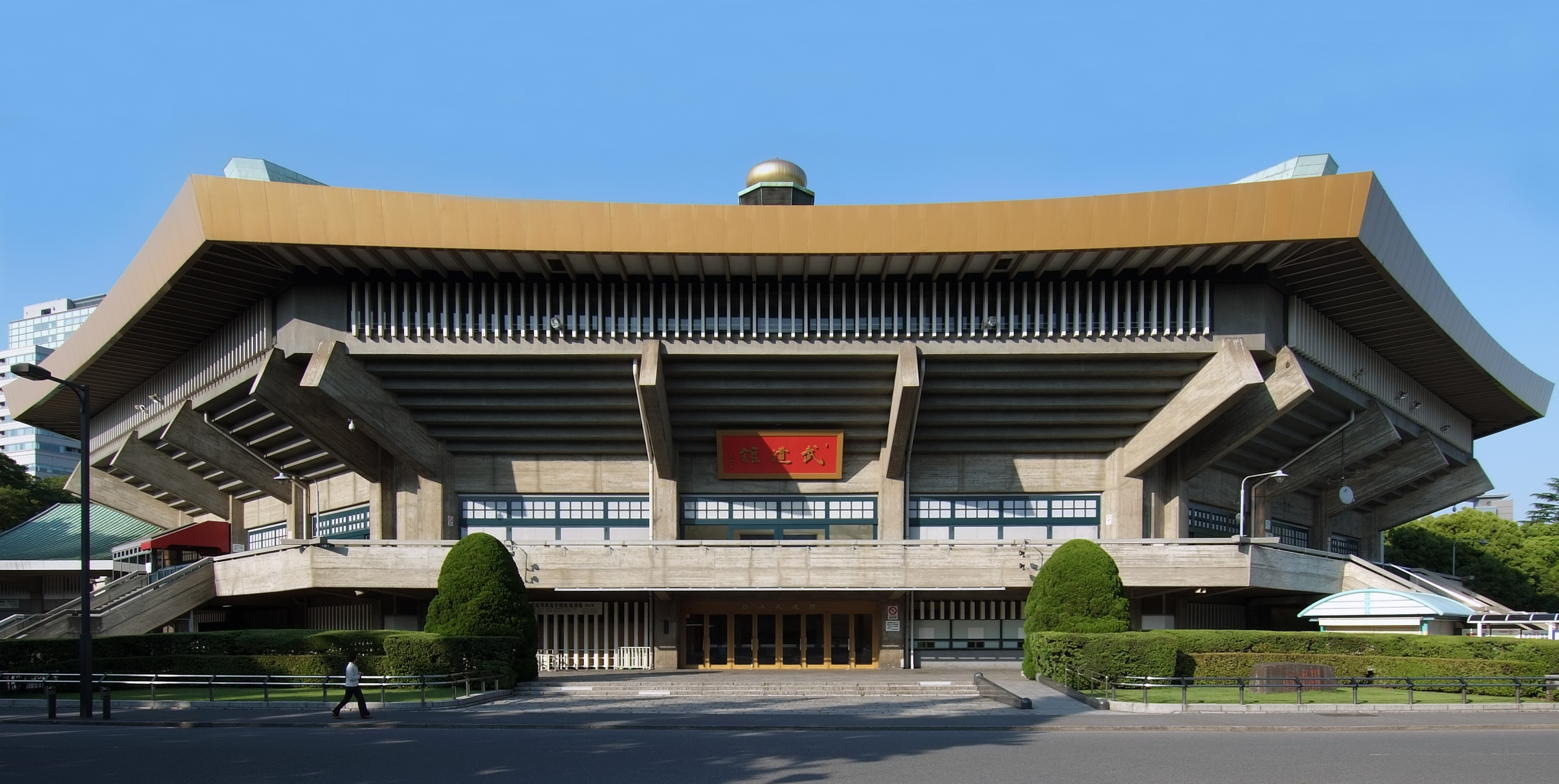
Nippon Budokan

- Asaka Nezu Park – Modern pentathlon (riding)
- Asaka Shooting Range – Modern pentathlon (shooting), Shooting (pistol/ rifle)
- Chofu City – Athletics (marathon, 50 kilometre walk)
- Enoshima – Sailing
- Fuchu City – Athletics (marathon, 50 kilometre walk)
- Hachioji City – Cycling (road)
- Hachioji Velodrome – Cycling (track)
- Karasuyama-machi – Athletics (marathon, 50 kilometre walk)
- Karuizawa – Equestrian
- Kemigawa – Modern pentathlon (running)
- Komazawa Gymnasium – Wrestling
- Komazawa Hockey Field – Field hockey
- Komazawa Stadium – Football preliminaries
- Komazawa Volleyball Courts – Volleyball preliminaries
- Korakuen Ice Palace – Boxing
- Lake Sagami – Canoeing
- Mitsuzawa Football Field – Football preliminaries
- Nagai Stadium – Football preliminaries
- Yoyogi National Gymnasium – Basketball (final), Diving, Modern pentathlon (swimming), Swimming
- National Stadium – Athletics, Equestrian (team jumping), Football (final)
- Nippon Budokan – Judo
- Nishikyogoku Athletic Stadium – Football preliminaries
- Ōmiya Football Field – Football preliminaries
- Prince Chichibu Memorial Football Field – Football preliminaries
- Sasazuka-machi – Athletics (marathon, 50 kilometre walk)
- Shibuya Public Hall – Weightlifting
- Shinjuku – Athletics (marathon, 50 kilometre walk)
- Toda Rowing Course – Rowing
- Tokorozawa Shooting Range – Shooting (trap)
- Tokyo Metropolitan Gymnasium – Gymnastics
- Tokyo Metropolitan Indoor Swimming Pool – Water polo
- Waseda Memorial Hall – Fencing, Modern pentathlon (fencing)
- Yokohama Cultural Gymnasium – Volleyball

== Transportation and communications ==
These games were the first to be telecast internationally. The games were telecast to the United States using Syncom 3, the first geostationary communication satellite, and from there to Europe using Relay 1, an older satellite which allowed only 15–20 minutes of broadcast during each of its orbits. Total broadcast time of programs delivered via satellite was 5 hours 41 minutes in the United States, 12 hours 27 minutes in Europe, and 14 hours 18 minutes in Canada. Pictures were received via satellite in the United States, Canada, and 21 countries in Europe. Several broadcasters recorded some sports from Japan and flown over to their countries. While the agreement to use satellite to transmit the games live to the United States was a proud achievement for the American government and Hughes Corporation which developed the satellites, NBC the rights holder had little interest in the project. NBC's participation was due to pressure from the Under-Secretary of State for Political Affairs Averell Harriman, and NBC intended to record the live transmissions for later use in sponsored shows. NBC broadcast the opening ceremonies live on the East coast of the United States, but delayed the broadcast on the West coast to 1:00 a.m. so Johnny Carson's Tonight Show would not be interrupted. When pressed on the issue NBC announced there would be no more live telecasts which angered the American State Department which saw the broadcasts as a matter of national prestige, and also the Hughes Aircraft Company who won the bid to build the satellite system over RCA which owned NBC.

TRANSPAC-1, the first trans-Pacific communications cable from Japan to Hawaii was also finished in June 1964 in time for these games. Before this, most communications from Japan to other countries were via shortwave.

The start of operations for the first Japanese bullet train (the Tokaido Shinkansen) between Tokyo Station and Shin-Ōsaka Station was scheduled to coincide with the Olympic games. The first regularly scheduled train ran on 1 October 1964, just nine days before the opening of the games, transporting passengers 515 kilometers (320 mi) in about four hours, and connecting the three major metropolitan areas of Tokyo, Nagoya, and Osaka.

Some already-planned upgrades to both highways and commuter rail lines were rescheduled for completion in time for these games. Of the eight main expressways approved by the Tokyo Metropolitan Government in 1959, No. 1, No. 4 and a portion of No. 2 and No. 3 were completed for the games. Two subway lines totaling 22 kilometers (14 mi) were also completed in time for the games, and the port of Tokyo facilities were expanded to handle the anticipated traffic.

== Visual identity ==
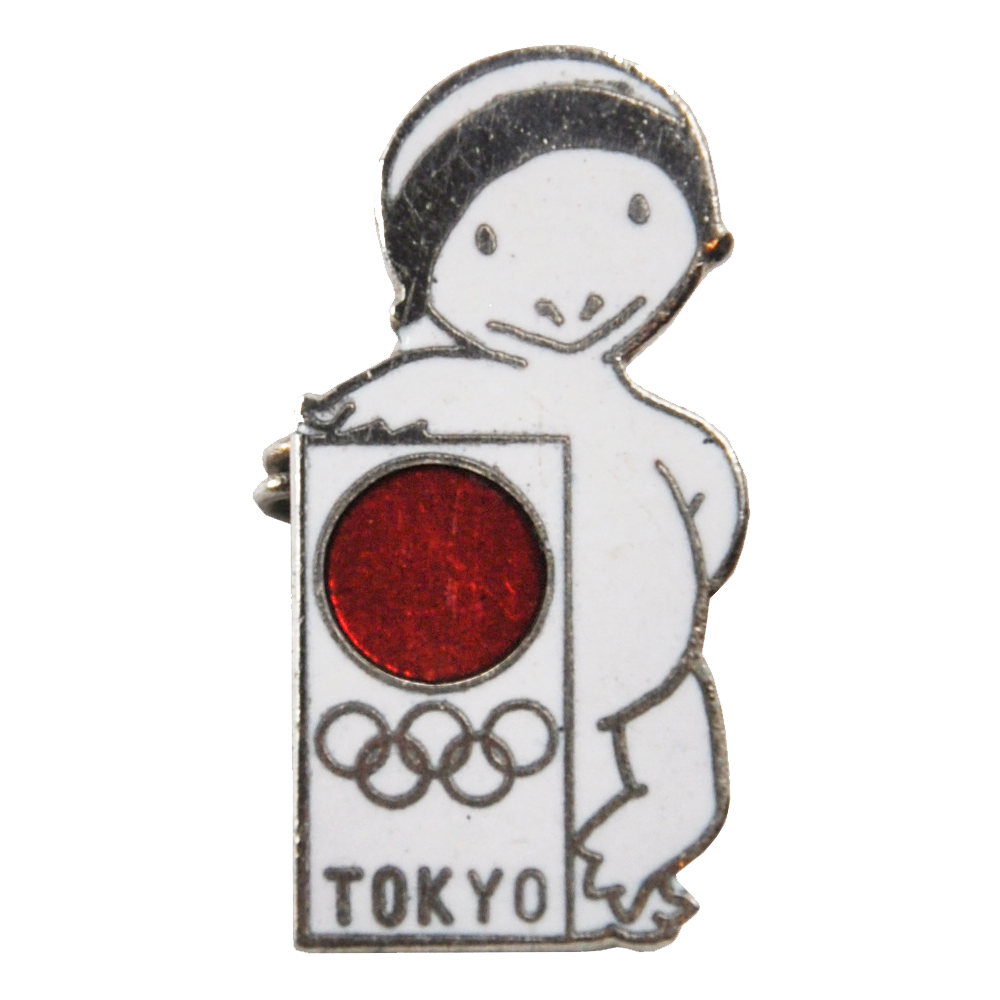
A kappa is considered an unofficial mascot of the 1964 Summer Olympics.

As a visual aid for foreign visitors to the Games, this Olympics was the first to use pictograms, created by Masaru Katsumi, to represent each event visually. This became a standard visual component of the modern Olympics ever since. The mythical kappa, which featured on a pin issued with the Olympic logo, is considered an unofficial mascot of the Games. Pins with a kappa were made annually beginning in 1956 for the Tokyo Sport festival, with the 1964 edition specifically commemorating the Olympics.

== Cost ==
The Oxford Olympics Study established the outturn cost of the Tokyo 1964 Summer Olympics at US$282 million in 2015-dollars. This includes sports-related costs only, that is, (i) operational costs incurred by the organizing committee for the purpose of staging the Games, e.g., expenditures for technology, transportation, workforce, administration, security, catering, ceremonies, and medical services, and (ii) direct capital costs incurred by the host city and country or private investors to build, e.g., the competition venues, the Olympic village, international broadcast center, and media and press center, which are required to host the Games. Indirect capital costs are not included, such as for road, rail, or airport infrastructure, or for hotel upgrades or other business investment incurred in preparation for the Games but not directly related to staging the Games. The cost for Tokyo 1964 compares with costs of US$4.6 billion for Rio 2016, US$40–44 billion for Beijing 2008 and US$51 billion for Sochi 2014, the most expensive Olympics in history. Average cost for Summer Games since 1960 is US$5.2 billion.

== Legacy ==
The 1964 Summer Olympics in Tokyo celebrated Japan's progress and reemergence on the world stage. The new Japan was no longer a wartime enemy, but a peaceful country that threatened no one, and this transformation was accomplished in fewer than 20 years.

To host such a major event, Tokyo's infrastructure needed to be modernized in time for large numbers of expected tourists. Enormous energy and expense was devoted to upgrading the city's physical infrastructure, including new buildings, highways, stadiums, hotels, airports and trains. There was a new satellite to facilitate live international broadcast. Multiple train and subway lines, a large highway building project, and the Tokaido Shinkansen, the fastest train in the world, were completed. Tokyo International Airport and the Port of Tokyo were modernized. International satellite broadcasting was initiated, and Japan was now connected to the world with a new undersea communications cable. The YS-11, a commercial turboprop plane developed in Japan, was used to transport the Olympic Flame within Japan. For swimming, a new timing system started the clock by the sound of the starter gun and stopped it with touchpads. The photo finish using a photograph with lines on it was introduced to determine the results of sprints. All of this demonstrated that Japan was now part of the first world and a technological leader, and at the same time demonstrated how other countries might modernize. In preparation for the games, 200,000 stray cats and dogs were rounded up and killed.

However, the construction projects resulted in environmental damage, forced relocations for residents, and loss of industry. In addition, corruption by politicians and construction companies resulted in cost overruns and shoddy work.

Although public opinion about the Olympics in Japan had initially been split, by the time the games started almost everyone was behind them. The broadcast of the opening ceremony was watched by over 70% of the viewing public, and the women's volleyball team's gold medal match was watched by over 80%.

As with many other Olympics, observers later stated that 1964 Olympic preparation and construction projects had had a negative effect on the environment and lower income people.

The Cary Grant film Walk, Don't Run was filmed during the Tokyo Olympics, and set in Tokyo during the Olympics. A message at the beginning of the film thanks the Japanese Government and Tokyo Police for putting up with them filming in crowded Tokyo.

The Studio Ghibli film From Up on Poppy Hill takes place one year before the Tokyo Olympics and refers to the upcoming games. The official poster can be seen several times in the film.

Tokyo attempted to bring the Olympic Games back to the city, having unsuccessfully bid for the 2016 Summer Olympics, which were awarded to Rio de Janeiro. Tokyo was chosen to host the 2020 Summer Olympics and Paralympics games, making it the first Asian city to host the games twice. The worldwide coronavirus pandemic, however, forced the organizers to postpone the games to summer 2021, the first time that the Olympic Games were postponed.

The Japan Society Fall 2019 exhibition, Made in Tokyo: Architecture and Living, 1964/2020, is an architectural exhibition that examines the social, cultural, economic, and political impacts of the 1964 Tokyo Olympics on the modernization of the Tokyo landscape (Homes, Offices, Retail Businesses, Athletic Stadiums, Hotels, and Transportation Stations). The exhibition was curated by the Japanese architectural firm Atelier Bow-Wow.

The majority of Japanese castles were smashed and destroyed in the late 19th century in the Meiji restoration by the Japanese people and government in order to modernize and westernize Japan and break from their past feudal era of the Daimyo and Shoguns. It was only due to the 1964 Olympics in Japan that cheap concrete replicas of those castles were built in preparation for tourists. The vast majority of castles in Japan today are new replicas made out of concrete. In 1959 a concrete keep was built for Nagoya castle.

== Boycotting countries ==
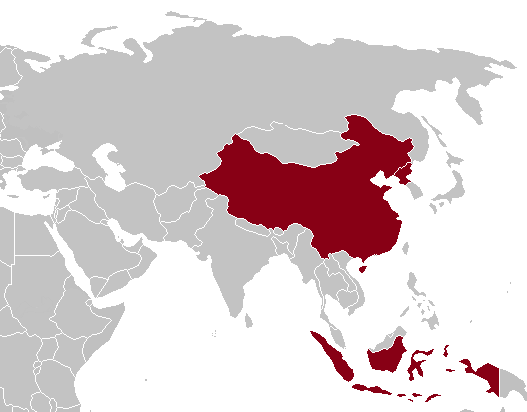
Countries that boycotted the 1964 Summer Olympics (shown in red on map)

North Korea withdrew its athletes from the 1964 Summer Olympics just before the Games were due to start, as the IOC were refusing to accept any athletes who had participated in the Games of the New Emerging Forces (GANEFO) held in Jakarta, Indonesia, in 1963. China and Indonesia also chose not to attend the Tokyo Games due to GANEFO issues.

== See also ==
- 1964 Summer Paralympics
- 1964 Winter Olympics
- Olympic Games held in Japan
  - 1964 Summer Olympics – Tokyo
  - 1972 Winter Olympics – Sapporo
  - 1998 Winter Olympics – Nagano
  - 2020 Summer Olympics – Tokyo
- List of IOC country codes
- Tokyo Olympiad, a documentary film about the 1964 Games.
- USSR Athletes, a painting by Soviet artist Dmitri Zhilinsky portraying the USSR national artistic gymnastics team preparing for the 1964 Olympics.

== Notes ==
Summer Olympics
Preceded by Rome	XVIII Olympiad; Tokyo; 1964	Succeeded by Mexico City
