= USSR Athletes =

1965 painting by Dmitry Zhilinsky

- Artist: Dmitri Zhilinsky
- Year: 1964—1965
- Type: Fiberboard, tempera, synthetic resins
- Dimensions: 268 cm × 216 cm (106 in × 85 in)
- Location: Russian Museum, Saint Petersburg

USSR Athletes (Russian: «Гимнасты СССР») is a tempera on fiberboard painting of 1964–1965, by the Russian artist Dmitri Zhilinsky (1927–2015). Zhilinsky portrayed members of the USSR national artistic gymnastics team preparing for the XVIII Olympic Games in Tokyo in the CSKA hall in Moscow. Among his characters are athletes who won first places in the Olympic Games, World and European Championships as part of the team or individually. It was created in 1964–1965. It is part of the collection and exposition of the State Russian Museum. The artist called it his most important work. The painting caused resonance in the artistic and sports environment.

In his work on the painting USSR Athletes, Zhilinsky used a painting technique that was new to him and to other Soviet artists of his time. Its traditions go back to Byzantine and Old Russian art, partly to the works of old European masters. The painting was exhibited at numerous All-Union, All-Russian and international exhibitions. In 1967 Dmitri Zhilinsky was awarded the silver medal of the Academy of Arts of the USSR for his painting USSR Athletes.

== History ==
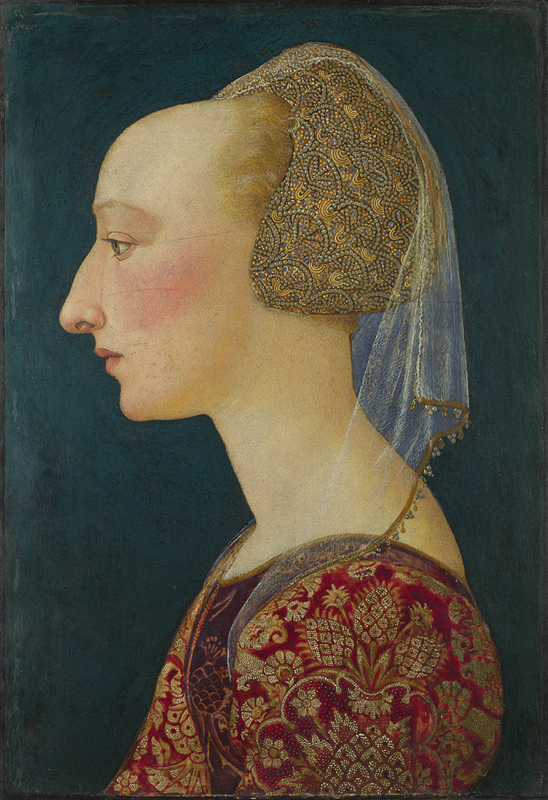
Paolo Uccello, Portrait of a Woman in Red, 1460s; National Gallery, London

In 1961, the artist traveled to Italy, where he studied Renaissance painting. He was impressed by the works of Giotto and Paolo Uccello. While working on the paintings By the Sea. Family and USSR Athletes, Zhilinsky for the first time used a new technique for himself — tempera. The traditions of tempera painting on gesso on chipboard go back to Byzantine and Old Russian art, partly to the works of old European masters. The technique of oil painting did not meet Zhilinsky's intentions. The artist himself recalled: "Sometime in the early sixties, my friend Albert Papikyan gave me a tempera and said: "I think it's your material". Dmitri Zhilinsky did not usually use wood panels, but rather fiberboard and chipboard (more affordable analogues with the rigidity the artist required). Before applying gesso to particleboard, which has an uneven surface, the artist usually glued a cloth over it. When applying polyvinyl acetate tempera to the painting, Zhilinsky combined it with egg yolk emulsion for strength and to preserve color saturation.

=== Conceptualization ===
In a 2011 interview, the artist talked about how he decided to create this painting:

"I really loved Italian Renaissance painting, for example, Titian. The Italians did amazing things regardless of the light. Once I walked into a sport hall: it was full of light from different directions, and the athletes were wearing white clothes, and the carpet was red. I made a sketch at home, I drew everybody, I had never made a single colorful sketch. And basing on my love for pure color, on drawings I made of each of them, I put them together. My idea is to convey the essence, not the appearance. Not the way it appears to the eye. And for some reason the Soviet authorities didn't like me at first..."

Later, Zhilinsky confirmed that he "made thar painting without sketches, with local stains, but with a precise drawing". He denied that the painting was commissioned to him, but noted that he had taken into account when creating it the following: "...the Soviet power likes to glorify itself and others in the same way", so he called the painting USSR Athletes. He also mentioned that the group of athletes was depicted against the background of a red carpet, and red is the color of Soviet power. However, Zhilinsky noted that he never painted what he did not want to. In another interview, Dmitri Zhilinsky recalled that he himself had once practiced gymnastics and told about the creation of the painting:

"And so, I decided to create Athletes.I went to the place where they were practicing before going abroad, and at that time our athletes took first place. They were wearing white sporty clothes, the hall had a carpet, and there were girls working out.I saw that team, such a beautiful team. At first, I was thinking of painting just one of them — he was the champion of Moscow, Kerdemelidi, a Greek by birth, and he was so handsome. But then I thought, why would I paint just him? They're all so handsome. So, I painted that group, mostly dressed in sports parade uniforms, with a carpet in the back, and the girls are doing somersaults. I followed those athletes in all competitions, painting, and painting, and painting them".

He said in another interview that he followed his characters to competitions for two and a half years and did it wit

External images
- | Pencil sketch, 1964 (Exhibition of works by D. D. Zhilinsky to the 90th anniversary of the artist's birth May 24 - June 18, 2017)
- | Another pencil sketch, 1964 (Exhibition of works by D. D. Zhilinsky to the 90th anniversary of the artist's birth May 24 - June 18, 2017).
- | Pencil Sketch (Exhibition of works by Dmitry Zhilinsky to the 90th anniversary of the artist's birth, The Creation of the World).

hout an official contract. He started working on the painting in the capital, and he'd come to Sochi to visit his mother. He said the painting got cut in the middle and shoved in his luggage. When he got there, Zhilinsky laid out the parts, screwed them together, and kept working.

Platon Pavlov's book about Dmitri Zhilinsky's work has a bunch of pencil sketches and sketches for the painting that the artist made: Sketch of the painting USSR Athletes (1963), Sketch of the painting USSR Athletes (1964), Sketch of the painting USSR Athletes (1964), Cardboard of the first version of the painting USSR Athletes (1964), The Athlete's Head (1974), Athlete (1964).

=== Exhibitions ===
The painting is made in tempera and synthetic resin on fiberboard. Its size is 268x216 cm. Some monographs and researches specify other materials and sizes. Victoria Lebedeva's book on the work of four Soviet artists, for example, specifies tempera, fiberboard, and gesso, and the size is 270x215 cm.

Zhilinsky remembered that Vladimir Favorsky first approved of his work, and he noted that his student had a good understanding of space. In the same interview, Favorsky claimed that he approved the sketch, not the painting itself. The USSR Art Fund purchased the painting USSR Athletes, which Zhilinsky found surprising at the time. Then, the director of the Russian Museum, Vasily Pushkaryov, bought the painting from the Fund. Zhilinsky said that his friends then made fun of the painting. "Well, Dima, he can draw, but his painting..." But the Soviet authorities liked it: good-looking people under the title USSR Athletes — at all international exhibitions, these athletes show up. And I was somehow accepted by the Soviet authorities thanks to the athletes".

Zhilinsky said in an interview that at an exhibition at the Union of Artists of the USSR, the painting was positively evaluated, but even his friends didn't recognize it as a painting because of the use of tempera. It was first put up in the graphics department, and it wasn't until the All-Union exhibition that it was moved to the painting section. The painting went with the athletes on the Olympic Games team to Japan, the USA, and Canada. At exhibitions in the Moscow Manege and the Academy of Arts, the painting was a hit with viewers from a great distance and got a lot of attention. In 1966, Zhilinsky's paintings USSR Athletes and Portrait of V. A. Favorsky were featured at the International Biennale in Venice. In 1967, the painting was awarded a silver medal from the Academy of Arts.

In 2011, the painting USSR Athletes was featured on a Russian postage stamp with a face value of fourteen rubles.

== Plot ==
Zhilinsky's painting represents members of the USSR national artistic gymnastics team preparing for the 1964 Olympics in Tokyo at the CSKA hall in Moscow. In another version, USSR Athletes is a group portrait of Soviet athletes who won first place at the Olympics, world championships, and European championships. I. P. Gorin believed that Zhilinsky depicted the athletes on the eve of training, so they're taut and collected. According to Victoria Lebedeva, the moving female figures in the background reinforce the statics of the figures in the foreground. Vitaly Manin said the painting's plot is like a conversation between the athletes and their coaches. But he noticed that the subject of the painting isn't clear. The athletes in the painting don't seem to care about the event happening in the background. Manin thought this was the first time Zhilinsky had made a painting where the subject was just a group portrait.

Female athletes depicted on the painting

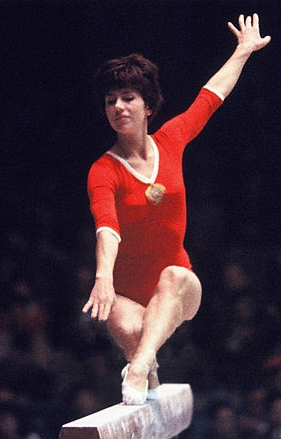
Tamara Manina is a two-time Olympic champion in team competition and a five-time world champion (In the center background).

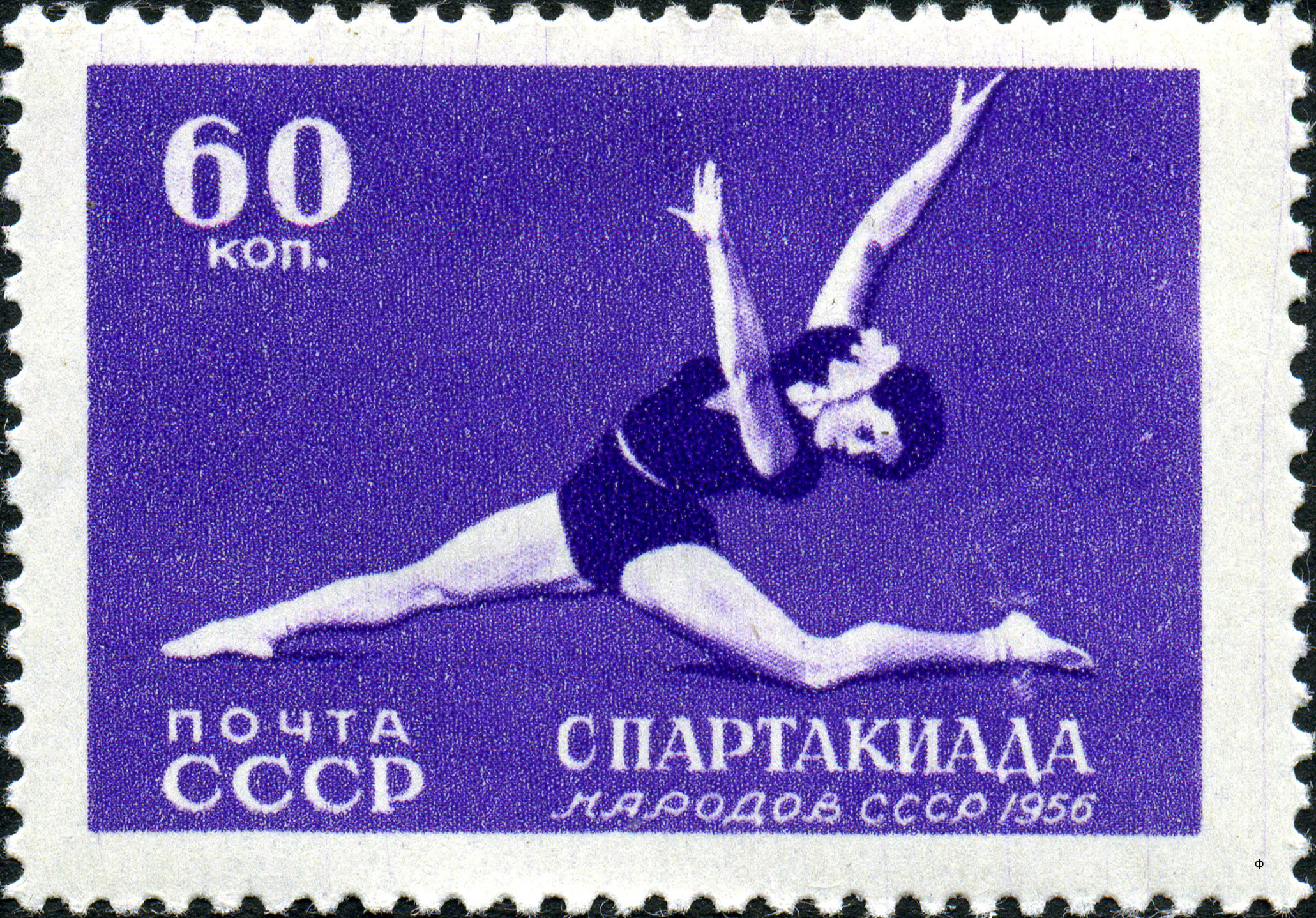
Sofia Muratova, double Olympic champion and three-time world champion (close to Tamara Manina).

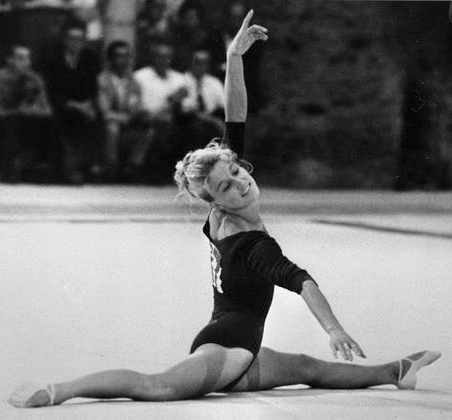
Polina Astakhova, three-time Olympic and two-time world champion (close to Tamara Manina).

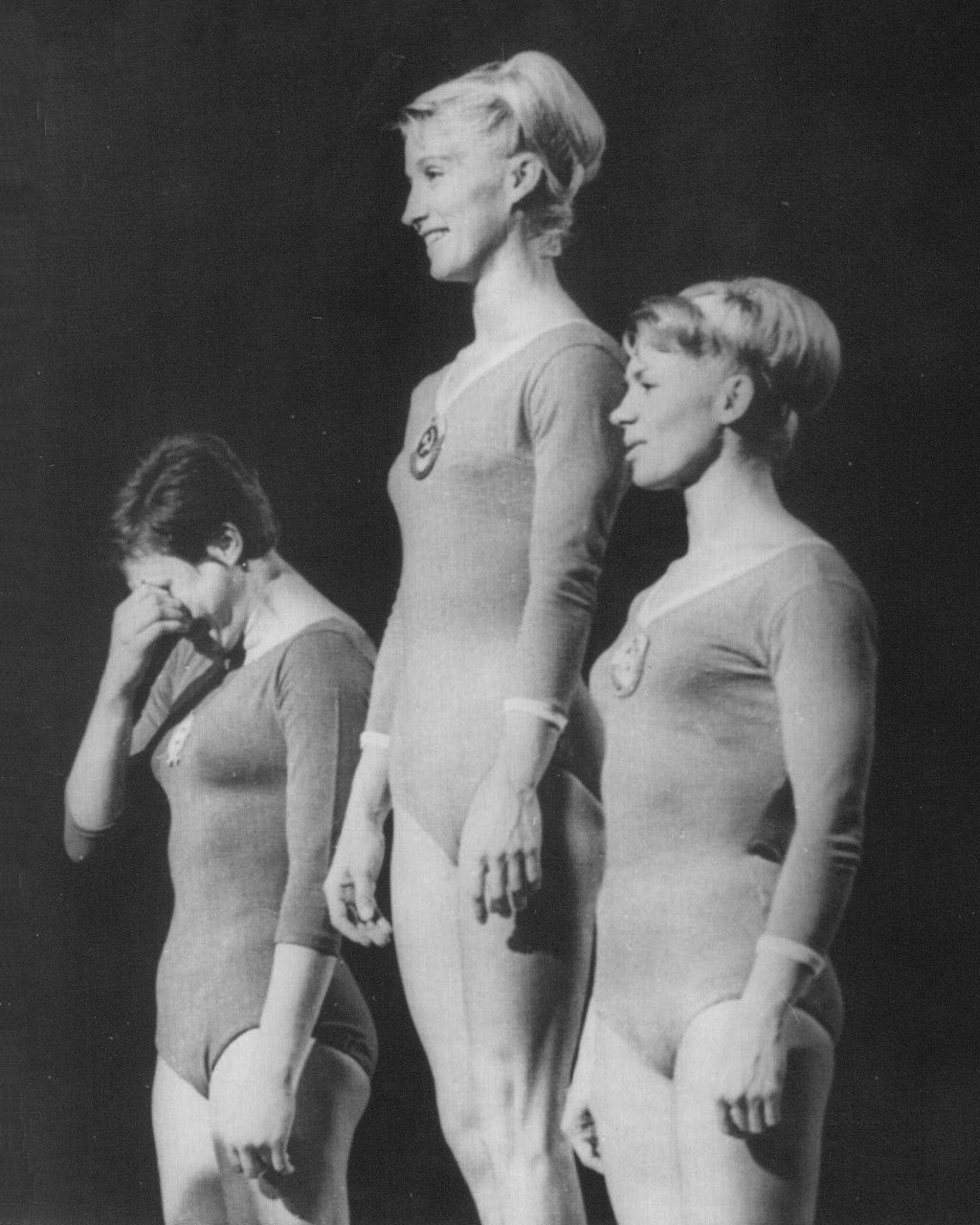
Larisa Latynina, a nine-time Olympic champion, Honored Master of Sports of the USSR, and multiple world and European champion. She was also a USSR champion in individual and team competitions. (Background on the right).
Male athletes depicted on the painting

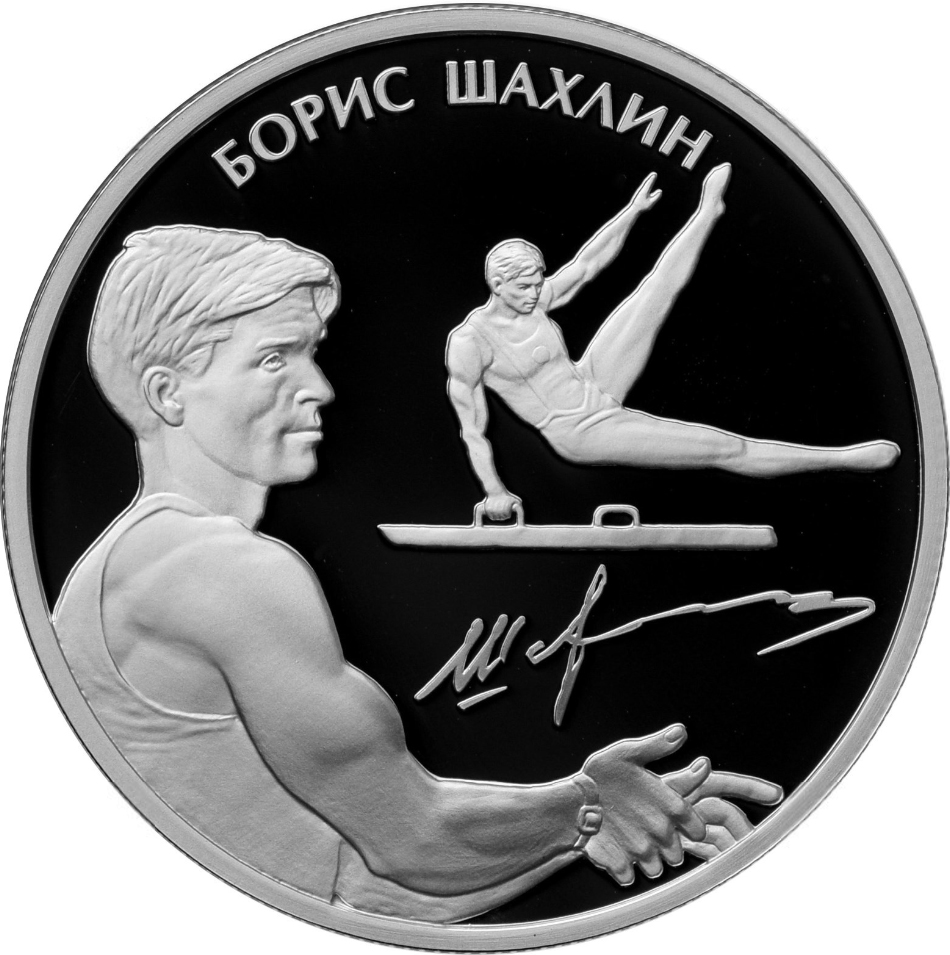
Boris Shakhlin, seven-time Olympic champion, absolute champion of the world, Europe and the USSR, the athlete was nicknamed Iron Shakhlin for his sporting courage and will to win. (On the right, frontal).

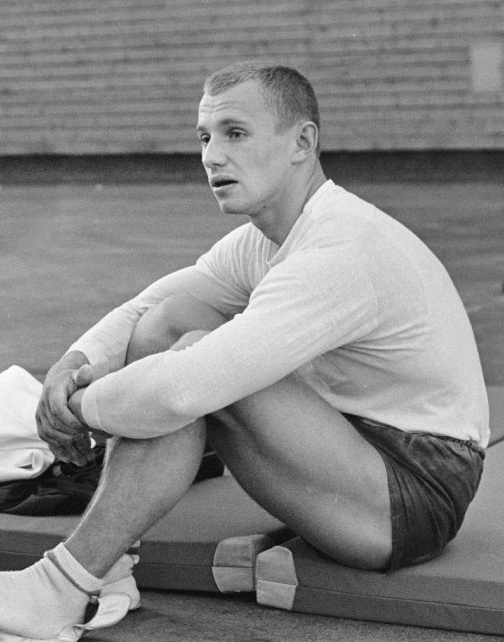
Sergey Diomidov, twice Olympic silver and bronze medalist. (Close to the parallel bars).

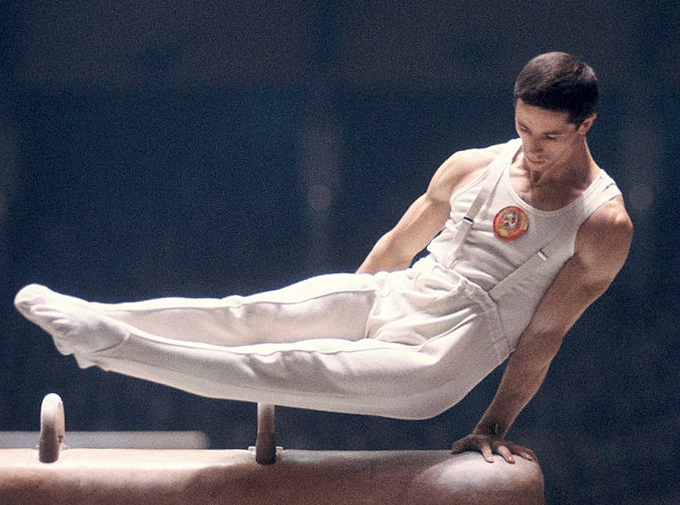
Olympic silver and bronze medalist Yury Tsapenko. (Profile)

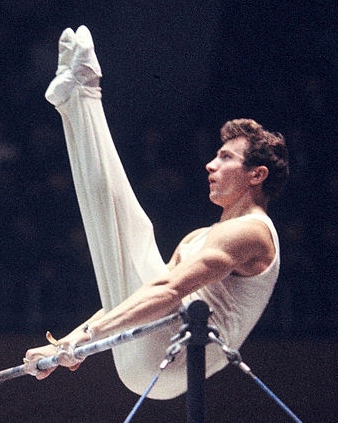
Five-time Olympic silver medalist Viktor Lisitsky. (In the center of the composition.)

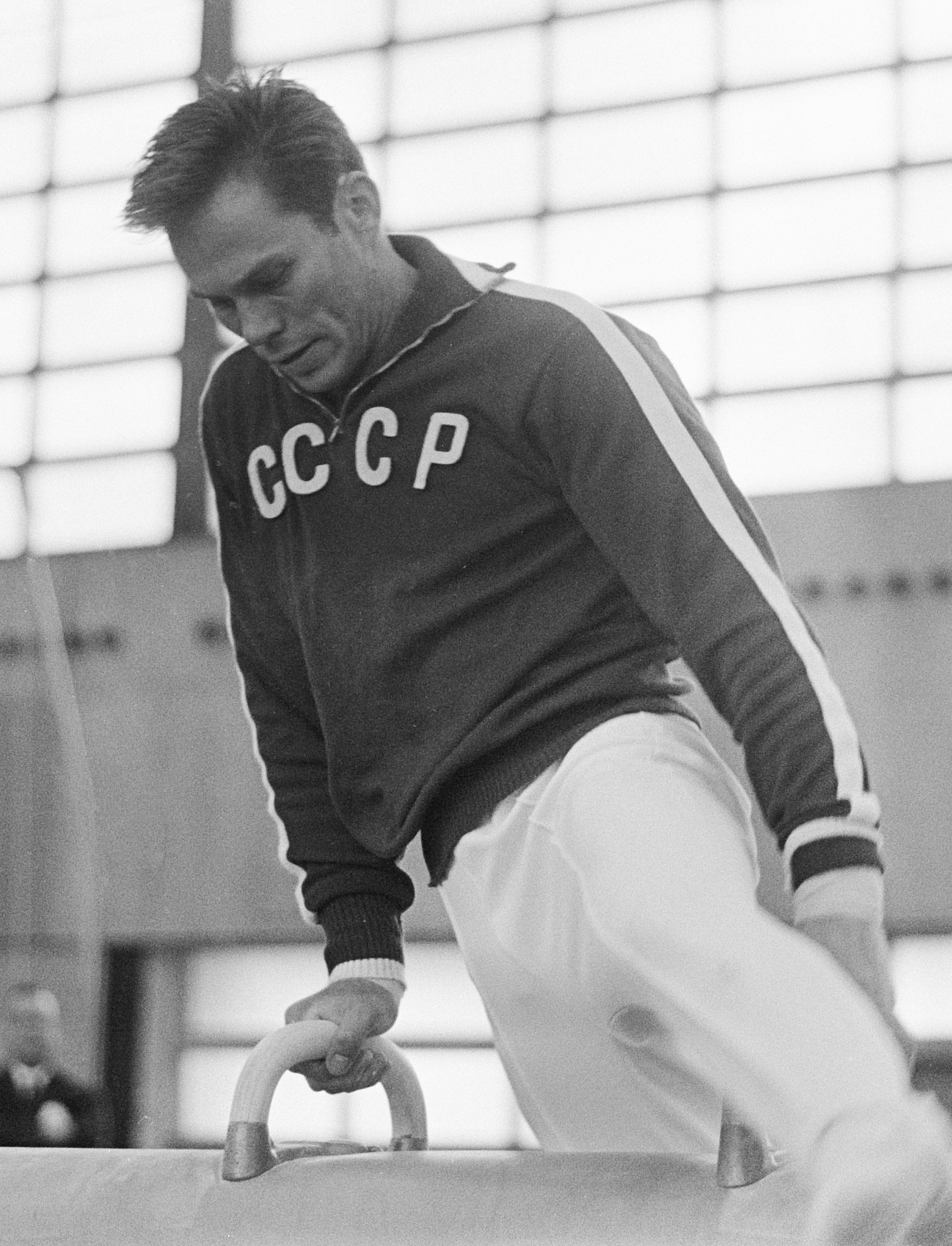
Yuri Titov: Olympic champion, four-time world champion, eight-time European champion, and later president of the International Gymnastics Federation. (Behind Lisitsky, in profile).

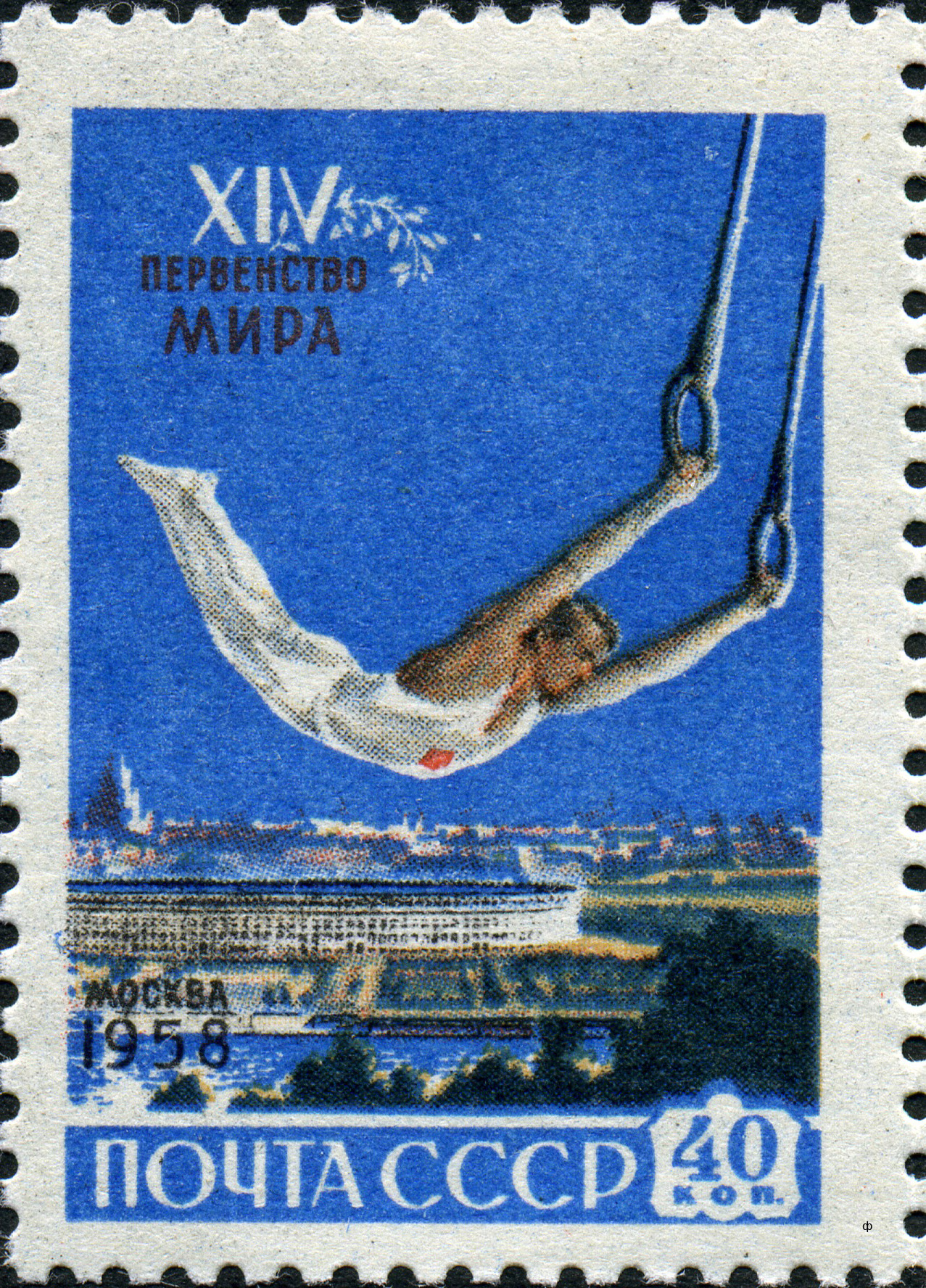
Valentin Muratov: four-time Olympic champion, absolute world champion, absolute champion of the USSR. (Coach in a blue sports suit).

== Critical reception ==
Anna Diakonitsina compares two paintings by Zhilinsky that were created at the same time: By the Sea. Family (painting) and USSR Athletes (1964–1965). She says the first one has an intimate composition, showing the artist's family, while the second one is a spectacular group portrait. She says they have a few things in common. For example, the space in both paintings has no depth, the plans are layered on top of each other, and the academic drawing doesn't show the human body's volume as strongly as Zhilinsky's previous works. She also says that the silhouettes and local color are important in both paintings. She says that on both, scarlet and blue-green, white and brown, red and black colors are put together in contrast, which makes the impact stronger and highlights different parts of the painting. Color is all about materiality, which is typical of iconography.

=== Zhilinsky's artistic references ===
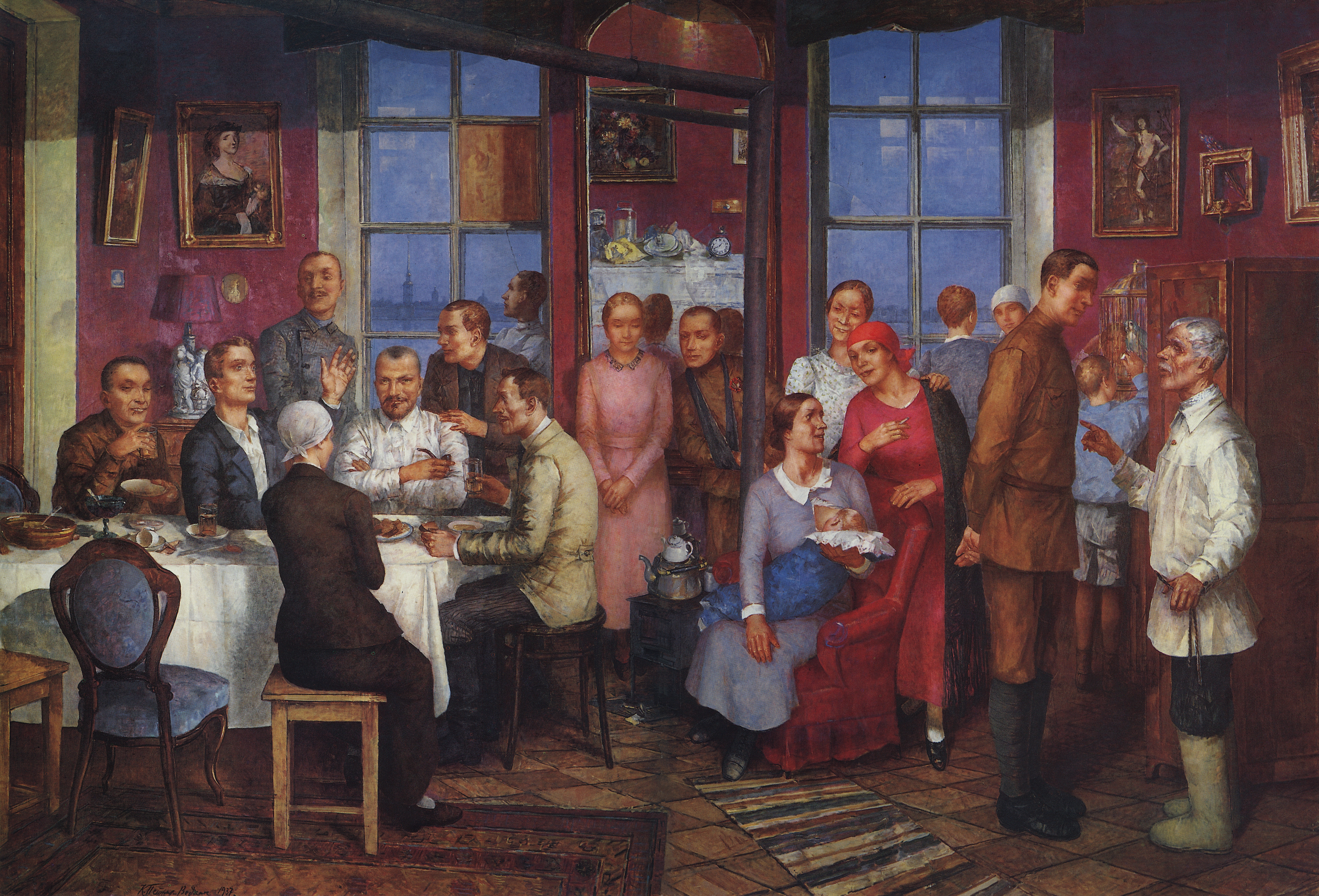
Kuzma Petrov-Vodkin. Housewarming, 1937

Maria Shashkina thought Zhilinsky deliberately chose gymnastics for its artistic side. Artistic gymnastics is a sport that's full of beauty and complexity. It requires total dedication and a lot of thought. The artist saw his heroes as the ideal of the ancient athlete, whose beauty combines physical perfection with strength of spirit. This idea reminded the Soviet art historian of the Renaissance master concept. She said that Zhilinsky created an ideal to be imitated, a standard of human virtues, encapsulated in a specific model. This kind of idealized, heroic treatment of the human form was all the rage at the time, but from the art historian's perspective, it's a whole different ball game. She says the painting stands out from other works from that era on the topic of sports because of its classical style and genre-specific details.

Mike O'Mahony thought that the style of USSR Athletes was full of cultural allusions. The way the painting is done is similar to the style of early Renaissance masters like Jan van Eyck, Lucas Cranach the Elder, and Paolo Uccello, as well as the influence of Andrei Rublev. You can see this in the use of tempera and wood, and in the big difference in size between the athletes in the front and the background. The little guys in the back are tiny, like the little figures on icons. He also thought that the artist used motifs from the 1920s and 1930s works of Kuzma Petrov-Vodkin, Alexander Samokhvalov, and the Soviet avant-garde (Kazimir Malevich, Vladimir Tatlin, Lyubov Popova, Varvara Stepanova), an interest that grew in the 1960s. He thought that the geometric shapes in the background of "athletes..." were inspired by Suprematism and Constructivism. He saw the dotted red line in the foreground as a nod to constructivist fabrics, like Popova's Spatial Constructions (1920). (Note: For details about constructivism in the fabrics of Lyubov Popova and Varvara Stepanova, see: Tulovskaya Y. Popova's and Stepanova's textile sketches. Comparison. Tatlin. (24 October 2016).)

Ivan Gorin called USSR Athletes a portrait-painting, and compared it to the Renaissance traditions: clear composition, sharp lines, expressive silhouettes, and harmony of white, red, and black. He also mentioned the unique perspective and how the artist really admired the beauty of the human body.

Kronid Ceskidov wrote about how the elements in the painting combine strength, artistry, and man's connection to the world.

Zinaida Arsenyeva saw an antique idealism in the painting's heroes, denying the severe style and finding similarities with classicism and empire. Eugenia Petrova mentioned minimalism, the influence of 1960s architecture, prints, and iconography.

=== Athlete representation ===
As for the depiction of the athletes, there are a few different takes on it. Some see it as a criticism of the Soviet discourse, while others see it as support for that discourse, with the artist using visual means to reinforce it.

- For example, Vitaly Manin thought the painting had a Spartan spirit, while Zhilinsky's focus was on the will and concentration of athletes getting ready for competition. Maria Shashkina pointed out that the artist painted an athlete who was physically perfect and morally uplifted.
- Mike O'Mahony wrote that athletes look like pale shadows, their poses are static, and coaches play a key role, personifying state control. He says the painting's monotony and alienation come from the changing view of sports in the USSR in the 1960s. In the USSR, athletic achievement became a tool of international politics instead of a way to build communism.
- Viktoria Lebedeva saw the painting as giving up on showing the characters' inner feelings to focus on creating a sense of tension and readiness for action. She said the colors and graphics made her feel anxious and like something was about to happen.
- Platon Pavlov said the painting shows how sports can make you stronger, physically and spiritually. He saw concentration and clarity in the athletes, and he called the painting itself a "laboratory of records".
- Sergei Aldonin and Arseny Zamostyanov talked about how the painting is a symbol of personal development and how talent and discipline go together. They also said that it's an example of the Soviet spirit of its heroes.

=== Composition ===
Platon Pavlov said that the painting's composition is based on an irregular spiral that groups the athletes loosely but tightly together. The spiral starts with the main figures (a white athlete, a red character, and a coach with a notebook), goes up and down and to the right, hits a dotted line on the floor, and then picks up again, ending with a gymnast holding onto the bars. There's no symmetry, but there's a rhythmic alternation of movements and poses, revealing centrifugal and centripetal forces. The viewer's gaze is taken outside the group but always brought back to the center, creating a harmonious mix of stillness and movement, freedom and rhythm, tension and rest. Pavlov said that this composition didn't just pop up out of nowhere. Zhilinsky originally had a different plan.

The first sketches for the painting showed two groups of figures randomly arranged, with an athlete with a notebook in the middle. Later on, the artist drew him standing up with his arms out, using a mat, a gymnastic horse, and bars to make the verticals and horizontals stand out. Then, the idea of a composition in the form of the Latin letter N with the left side curved outward came about. This form is traced in pencil and color sketches. In the first version of the painting (80 cm high), shown at the art lottery exhibition, the letter N was already blurred. The composition sort of included elements of circular movement, which was emphasized by a large circle on the floor. In the final version, though, the circle went away and the spiral arrangement of the figures got stronger. Zhilinsky started out wanting a static scheme, shown by the letter N, but eventually settled on a more dynamic composition. The spiral came about on its own, which the artist himself noticed. Pavlov thought the final piece mixed constructive statics and lively dynamics.

=== Space ===
The space of the painting is very important. However, Pavlov believes that the author's high point of view and the characters' parallel silhouettes (not considering the high point of view) make the figures look tiered. This makes the figures look flat and decorative. It also makes the female figures look much smaller than the male figures. The red carpet in the background is much lighter and more colorful than the carpet in the foreground. This makes the space where the men are separate from the space where the women are. The overall flat and decorative look is made even stronger by a detail — a drawer on legs with powder for rubbing hands. The lack of perspective in the painting makes it seem less realistic, which makes the decorative elements on the canvas stand out more.

Vitaly Manin also noted that the painting is painted flatly, and the volumes are outlined with a faint shade of white. Olga Baldina also noted that the space in the painting is conventional, and "the figures form a kind of sign, unfolded on a flat surface with a high horizon".

=== Color solution ===
Platon Pavlov noticed that the artist only used a few shades of color to paint the faces, shoulders, and arms of his characters when they were naked. He painted the floor surfaces, carpets, and clothes as decorative, colorful spots with no shading or light and shadow.

Kronid Ceskidov wrote about the painting:

"The colors in the painting are lively and spontaneous. The floor of the sport hall, shown from above, serves as the background. The floor is covered in a precise pattern of red, cherry-red, and crimson squares. These squares contrast with the figures of the athletes in white uniforms and those in dark tights. The blue uniforms of the coaches add to the intensity of the colors".

The artist placed great importance on color in the painting. He wrote, "In paintings like By the Sea, Family and USSR Athletes, I wanted to show not a specific moment, but the essence of what I'm painting, its color, which exists independently of the lighting. He wanted to make the figures and the way they move look real, so he kept the colors bright and clear, and he avoided shadows, especially falling shadows.

Viktoria Lebedeva identified three main colors in the painting: red, brown, and white.The men in white suits stand out against the bright background of carpets.The shapes of the figures, or silhouettes, create a sense of anxiety, expectation, and tension in the painting. The red at the top of the canvas highlights the arms, shoulders, and heads of the athletes. The red color of one of the costumes extends to the bottom of the painting.

Vitaly Manin noticed that the painting's visual style was new and different. The colors are applied in thick, flat layers. The lines create the shapes of the figures, and the figures aren't fully three-dimensional. The painting style is called "semitonal," and it's enough to suggest the volume of heads" and the red color is used to "fill in" spaces. According to the art historian, the space is created by "activating the color" and "making the figures smaller as they are removed".

== Bibliography ==
- Andreeva, E. Yu. (2008). XX век в Русском музее: живопись, скульптура 1900—2000 годов: к 110-летию Русского музея [XX century in the Russian Museum: painting, sculpture 1900-2000: to the 110th anniversary of the Russian Museum]. Государственный Русский музей: альманах (in Russian). СПб.: Graficart-Palace Editions. p. 391. ISBN 978-5-93332-287-0.
- Baldina, O. D. (2012). Дмитрий Жилинский — человек и художник: к юбилею мастера [Dmitry Zhilinsky - man and artist: to the anniversary of the master] (in Russian). журнал: Культура и искусство. pp. 69–82.
- Gorin, I. P. (1969). Героическое в портрете, станковой скульптуре, графике // Образ современника в советской жанровой живописи [Heroic in portraits, easel sculpture, graphics // The image of the contemporary in Soviet genre painting] (in Russian). М.: Советский художник. pp. 58–66.
- Diyakonitsyna, A. A. (2017a). Дмитрий Жилинский. Ближний круг [Dmitry Zhilinsky. Close Circle] (in Russian). журнал: Третьяковская галерея.
- Diyakonitsyna, A. A. (2017b). Дмитрий Жилинский [Dmitry Zhilinsky]. Художник в Третьяковской галерее (in Russian). М.: Третьяковская галерея. p. 46. ISBN 978-5-89580-165-9.
- Дмитрий Жилинский. Ближний круг. Каталог выставки (13 апреля — 5 июля 2017 года) [Dmitry Zhilinsky. The Middle Circle. Exhibition catalog (April 13 - July 5, 2017)] (in Russian). М.: Третьяковская галерея. 2017. p. 116. ISBN 978-5-9500133-0-0.
- Zhilinsky D. D., Arseniyeva Z. V. (2015). Датская королева и гимнасты СССР. Интервью с художником [The Danish Queen and the USSR gymnasts. Interview with the artist] (in Russian). газета: Вечерний Петербург. Archived from the original on 18 November 2019.
- Zhilinsky D. D., Kozyrev A. (2011). Дмитрий Жилинский: "Я удивляюсь красоте людей". С народным художником России Дмитрием Жилинским беседовал Алексей Козырев [Dmitry Zhilinsky: “I am surprised by the beauty of people”. Alexei Kozyrev spoke to People's Artist of Russia Dmitry Zhilinsky] (in Russian). Vol. 3. Сократ: журнал. Онлайн-версия. pp. 184–190.
- Zhilinsky, D. D. (2015). О том, как сливал дизельное топливо у немцев, рисовал орнамент из кошек и учился пониманию пространства у Фаворского. С народным художником России Дмитрием Жилинским беседовала Отдельнова В. А. [About how he drained diesel fuel from the Germans, drew ornaments from cats and learned to understand space from Favorsky. People's Artist of Russia Dmitry Zhilinsky was interviewed by V.A. Otdelnova.] (in Russian). Устная история: веб-сайт архива «Устная история».
- Zhilinsky D. D., Solodovnikova E. (2014). Пространство Дмитрия Жилинского. Интервью с художником [Dmitry Zhilinsky's Space. Interview with the artist] (in Russian). газета: Аргументы Недели.
- Konchin, E. V. (2004). Время задуматься о смысле жизни…Дмитрий Жилинский // Моё поколение. Рассказы о художниках [Time to think about the meaning of life...Dmitry Zhilinsky // My Generation. Stories about artists] (in Russian). М.: Российская академия художеств. pp. 39–50.
- Lebedeva, V. (2008). Дмитрий Жилинский. // Мои современники [Dmitry Zhilinsky. // My contemporaries] (in Russian). М.: Галарт. pp. 55–87. ISBN 978-5-269-01074-8.
- Lebedeva, V. (2001). Жилинский [Zhilinsky] (in Russian). М.: Белый город, Государственный институт искусствоведения. p. 344. ISBN 5-7793-0396-7.
- Manin, V. S. (2006). Дмитрий Жилинский [Dmitry Zhilinsky]. Современные русские живописцы (in Russian). СПб.: Аврора. p. 96.
- Manin, V. S. (2007). 3. Параллели (1960–1990-е годы). 01. Жилинский Дмитрий Дмитриевич // Русская живопись XX века [3. Parallels (1960s-1990s). 01. Dmitry Dmitriyevich Zhilinsky. Russian painting of the XX century] (in Russian). Vol. 3. СПб.: Аврора. p. 552. ISBN 978-5-7300-0848-9.
- Nazarenko, E. (1992). Художник, подводный охотник // Спортсмен-подводник: Сборник [Artist, underwater hunter // Sportsman-submariner: Collection] (PDF) (in Russian). pp. 53–55.
- O'Mahony, M. (2010). Спорт в СССР. Физическая культура визуальная культура [Sport in the USSR: Physical Culture] (in Russian). М.: Новое литературное обозрение. p. 304. ISBN 978-5-8679-3815-4.
- Pavlov, P. A. (1980). Картина Д. Жилинского "Гимнасты СССР" [Painting by D. Zhilinsky USSR Athletes] (in Russian). Vol. 6. журнал: Искусство. pp. 20–22.
- Pavlov, P. A. (1974). Дмитрий Жилинский [Dmitry Zhilinsky] (in Russian). Л.: Художник РСФСР.
- Pavlov, P. A. (1989). Развитие образно-пластической структуры современной советской живописи: конец 1950-х — 1970-е годы [Figurative and plastic structure of modern Soviet painting development: late 1950s - 1970s] (in Russian). М.: Наука. pp. 102–189.
- Спорт в искусстве / Ред. А. Лакс [Sport in art / Ed. A. Lux.]. Государственный Русский музей: альманах (in Russian). СПб.: Palace Editions. 2009. p. 391. ISBN 978-5-93332-341-9.
- Cheskidov, K. G. (1984). Художник и олимпийская Москва [The artist and Olympic Moscow] (in Russian). М.: Советский художник. p. 159.
- Shashkina, M. V. (1989). Д. Жилинский [D. Zhilinsky]. Мастера советского искусства (in Russian). М.: Советский художник. p. 144. ISBN 5-269-00010-5.
