= Katame-waza ura-no-kata =

Judo form/technique

- Classification: Kata
- Sub classification: Non-Kodokan kata
- Kodokan: No

Technique name
- Rōmaji: Katame-waza ura-no-kata
- Japanese: 固め技裏の形

The Katame-waza ura-no-kata (固め技裏の形, Katame-waza ura-no-kata, "forms of reversing controlling techniques") is a judo kata that can be considered as a complement to Mifune Kyūzō's Nage-waza ura-no-kata, but that instead focuses on counter-attacks to controlling techniques rather than throwing techniques. It was compiled by Itō Kazuo from techniques developed by other Japanese newaza experts, and is not an officially recognized Kodokan kata.

== Video of Katame-waza ura-no-kata ==
- "Katame-waza ura-no-kata" on YouTube
