= Seiryoku Zen'yo Kokumin Taiiku no Kata =

Martial arts forms/techniques

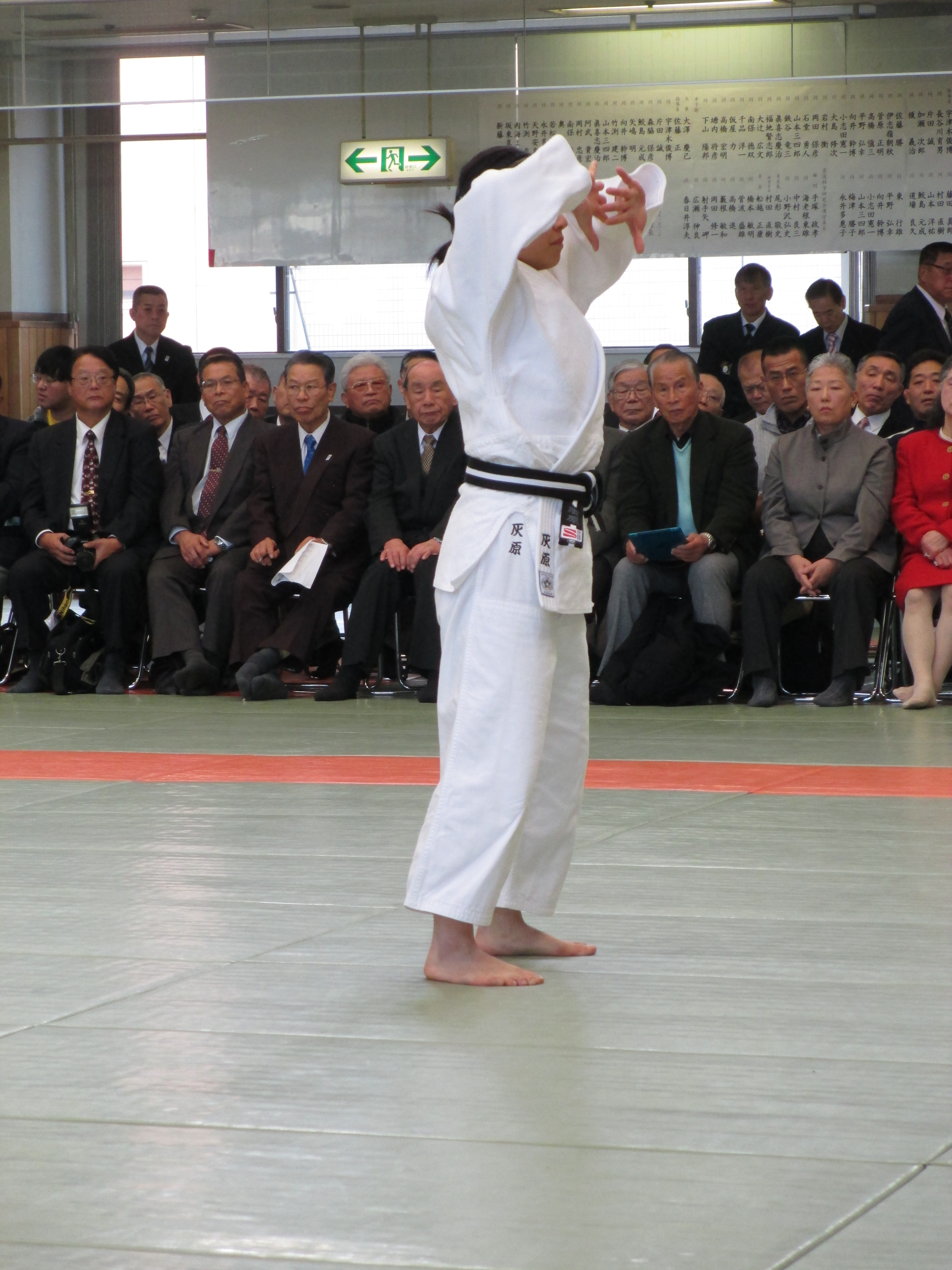
- Classification: Kata
- Sub classification: Kodokan kata
- Kodokan: Yes

Technique name
- Rōmaji: Seiryoku Zen'yo Kokumin Taiiku no Kata
- Japanese: 精力善用国民体育の形
- English: Maximum-Efficiency National Physical Education Kata

Seiryoku Zen'yo Kokumin Taiiku no Kata (精力善用国民体育の形, Maximum-Efficiency National Physical Education Kata) is a set of physical exercises that are part of judo.

Its purpose is to promote the development of strong, healthy minds and bodies in an interesting and useful way. It consists of two groups of exercises, one to be practiced alone, the other with a partner.
