= Judo =

Japanese modern martial art

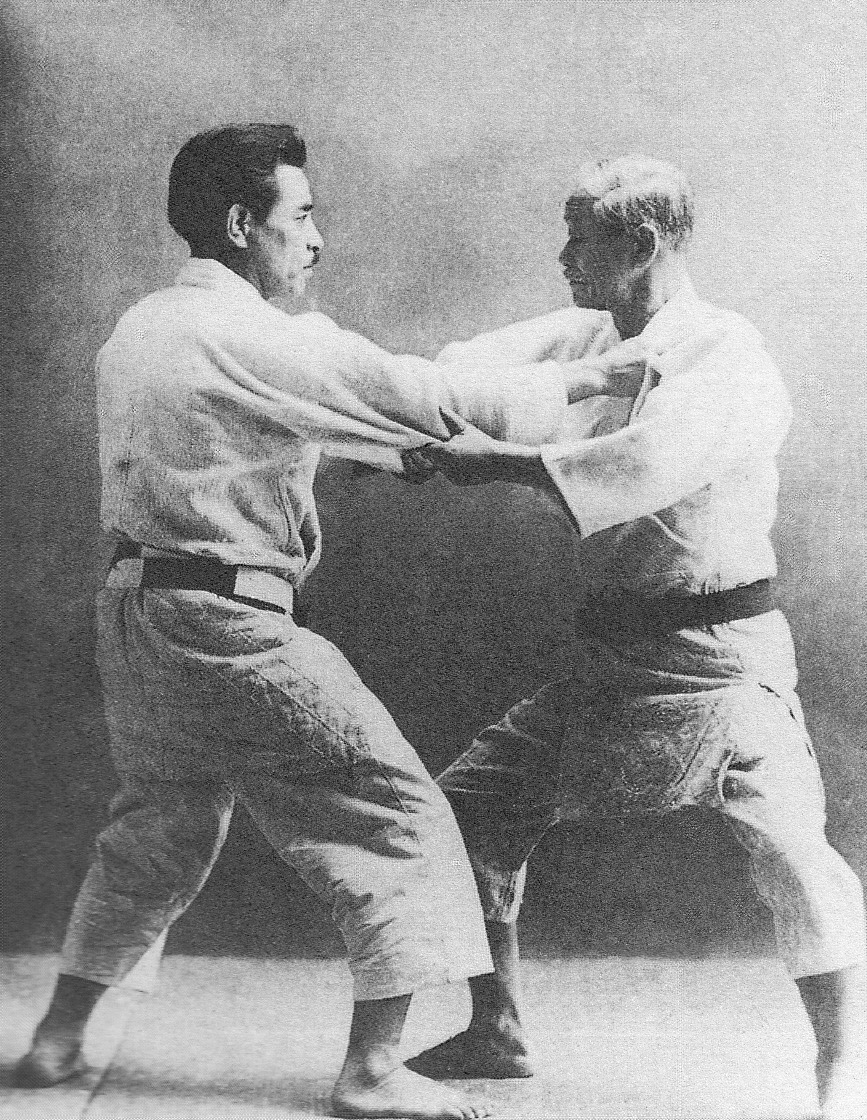
- Kyuzo Mifune (left) and Kanō Jigorō (right)
- Focus: Grappling, ground fighting
- Hardness: Full contact
- Country of origin: Japan
- Creator: Kanō Jigorō
- Famous practitioners: See: List of judoka
- Parenthood: Various koryū Jujutsu schools, principally Tenjin Shin'yō-ryū, Kitō-ryū,
- Ancestor arts: Tenjin Shin'yō-ryū; Yoshin ryu; Shiten ryu; Sekiguchi Ryu; Sosuishi Ryu; Fusen Ryu; Kito Ryu; Takenouchi Ryu; Miura Ryu; Kyushin Ryu; Ryōi Shintō-ryū; Tsutsumi Hozan Ryu
- Descendant arts: Kosen judo, Bartitsu, Yoseikan Budō, Brazilian jiu-jitsu, Sambo, ARB, CQC, Gongkwon Yusul, Hapkido, Krav Maga, Kapap, Kūdō, Kyukgido, MMA, modern Arnis, Gracie Jiu-Jitsu, Luta Livre, shoot wrestling, submission grappling, Vale Tudo, Yongmudo
- Olympic sport: Accepted as an Olympic sport in 1960 (see below); Contested since 1964 (men) and 1992 (women)
- Official website: International Judo Federation (IJF); The Kodokan

Judo
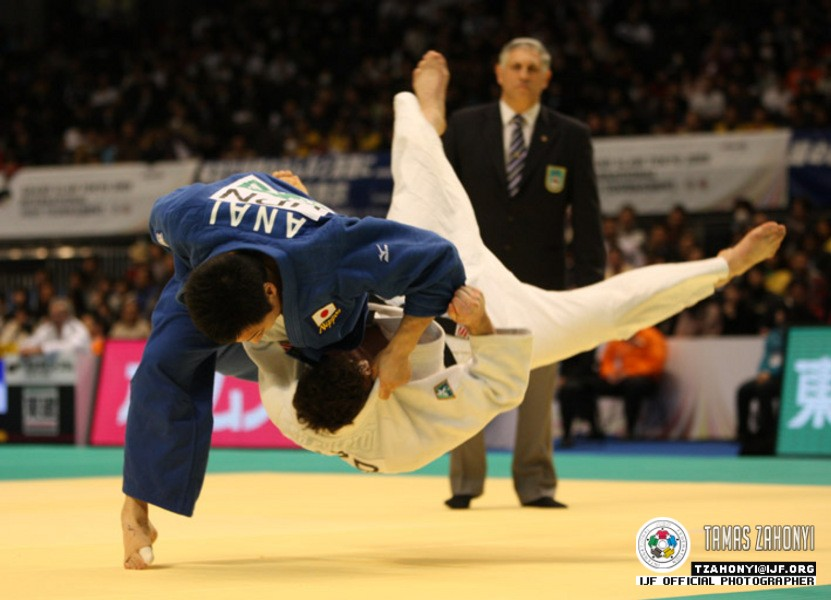
- Takamasa Anai takes down his opponent during the Grand Slam Tokyo.
- Highest governing body: International Judo Federation

Characteristics
- Contact: Yes
- Mixed-sex: No
- Type: Martial art

Presence
- Country or region: Worldwide
- Olympic: Debuted in 1964

Judo (Japanese: 柔道, Hepburn: Jūdō; lit. 'gentle way') is an unarmed modern Japanese martial art, combat sport, Olympic sport (since 1964), Paralympic sport (since 1988) and Commonwealth Games sport (since 1990). Judo is the most prominent form of Samurai throws and self-defense competed internationally. Judo was created in 1882 by Kanō Jigorō (嘉納 治五郎) as an eclectic martial art, distinguishing itself from its predecessors (primarily Tenjin Shinyo-ryu jujutsu and Kitō-ryū jujutsu) due to an emphasis on "randori" (乱取り, lit. 'free sparring') instead of kata (形, kata; pre-arranged forms) alongside its removal of striking and weapon training elements. Judo rose to prominence for its dominance over established jujutsu schools in tournaments hosted by the Tokyo Metropolitan Police Department (警視庁武術大会, Keishicho Bujutsu Taikai), resulting in its adoption as the department's primary martial art. A judo practitioner is called a "judoka" (柔道家, jūdōka), and the judo uniform is called "judogi" (柔道着, jūdōgi; "judo attire").

The objective of competitive judo is to throw an opponent forcefully onto their backs, immobilize them with a pin, or force an opponent to submit with a joint lock or a choke. While strikes and use of weapons are included in some pre-arranged forms (kata), they are not frequently trained and are illegal in judo competition or free practice. Judo's international governing body is the International Judo Federation, and competitors compete in the international IJF professional circuit.

Judo's philosophy revolves around two primary principles: "Seiryoku-Zenyo" (精力善用; lit. 'maximum efficient use of energy') and "Jita-Kyoei" (自他共栄; lit. 'mutual welfare and benefit'). The philosophy and subsequent pedagogy developed for judo became the model for other modern Japanese martial arts that developed from Ko-ryū. Judo has also spawned a number of derivative martial arts around the world, such as Brazilian jiu-jitsu, Krav Maga, sambo, and ARB. Judo also influenced the formation of other combat styles such as close-quarters combat (CQC), mixed martial arts (MMA), shoot wrestling, and other styles of submission wrestling.

== History and philosophy ==
=== Early life of its founder ===
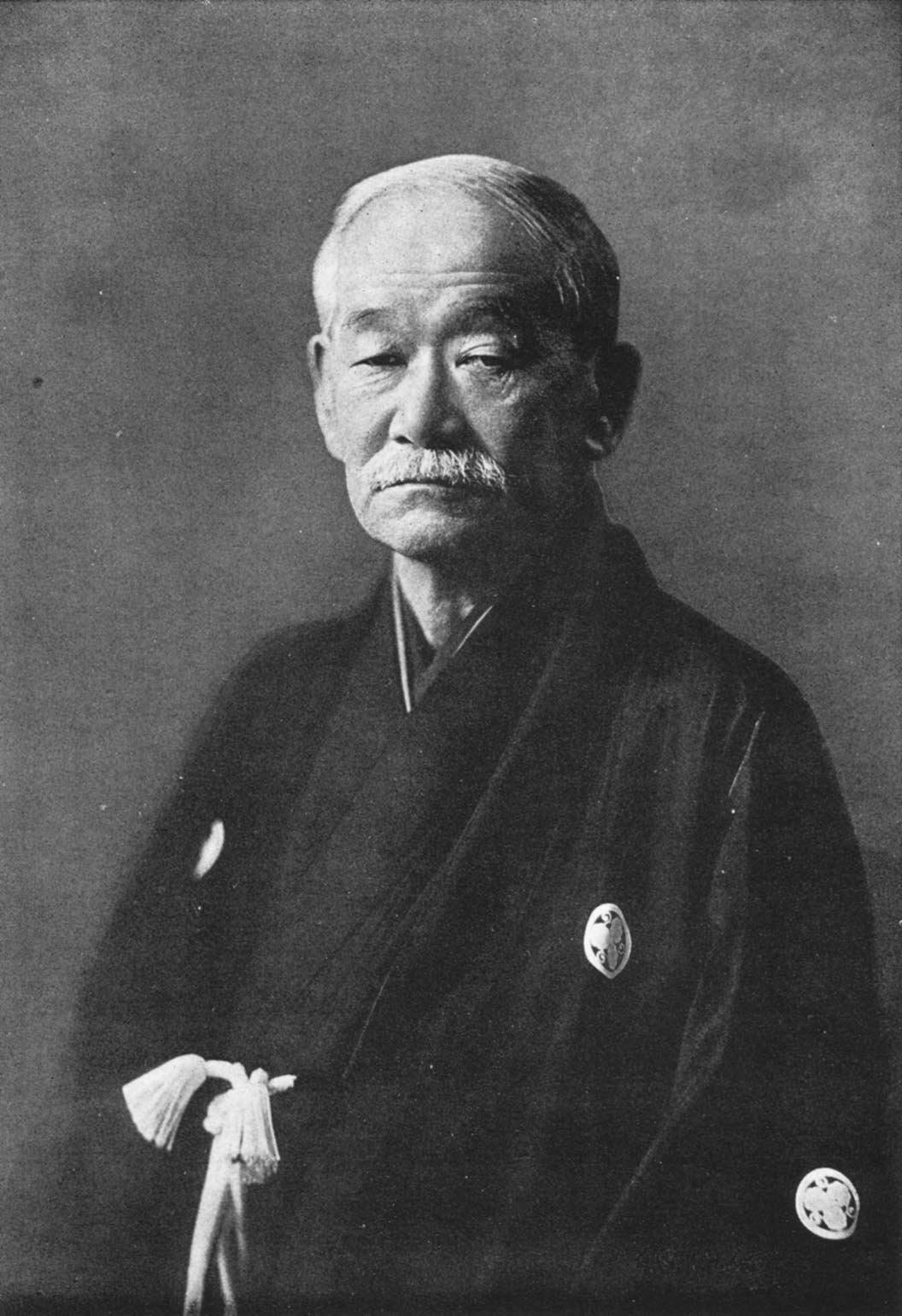
Jigoro Kano, founder of judo

The early history of judo is inseparable from its founder, Japanese polymath and educator Kanō Jigorō (嘉納 治五郎, Jigoro Kano; 1860–1938), born Shinnosuke Jigorō (新之助 治五郎, Jigorō Shinnosuke). Kano was born into a relatively affluent family. His father, Jirosaku, was the second son of the head priest of the Shinto Hiyoshi shrine in Shiga Prefecture. He married Sadako Kano, daughter of the owner of Kiku-Masamune sake brewing company and was adopted by the family, changing his name to Kano. He ultimately became an official in the Shogunate government.

Jigoro Kano had an academic upbringing and, from the age of seven, he studied English, shodō (書道, Japanese calligraphy) and the Four Confucian Texts (四書, Shisho) under a number of tutors. When he was fourteen, Kano began boarding at an English-medium school, Ikuei-Gijuku in Shiba, Tokyo. The culture of bullying endemic at this school was the catalyst that caused Kano to seek out a Jūjutsu (柔術, Jujutsu) dōjō (道場, dōjō; training place) at which to train.

Early attempts to find a jujutsu teacher who was willing to take him on met with little success. Jujutsu had become unfashionable in an increasingly westernized Japan. Many of those who had once taught the art had been forced out of teaching or become so disillusioned with it that they had simply given up. Nakai Umenari, an acquaintance of Kanō's father and a former soldier, agreed to show him kata, but not to teach him. The caretaker of Jirosaku's second house, Katagiri Ryuji, also knew jujutsu, but would not teach it as he believed it was no longer of practical use. Another frequent visitor, Imai Genshiro of Kyushin-ryū school of jujutsu, also refused. Several years passed before he finally found a willing teacher.

In 1877, as a student at the University of Tokyo, Kano learned that many jujutsu teachers had been forced to pursue alternative careers, frequently opening Seikotsu-in (整骨院; traditional osteopathy practices). After inquiring at a number of these, Kano was referred to Fukuda Hachinosuke (c. 1828–1880), a teacher of the Tenjin Shin'yō-ryū of jujutsu, who had a small nine mat dōjō where he taught five students. Fukuda is said to have emphasized technique over formal exercise, sowing the seeds of Kano's emphasis on randori (乱取り, randori; free practice) in judo.

On Fukuda's death in 1880, Kano, who had become his keenest and most able student in both randori and kata, was given the densho (伝書; scrolls) of the Fukuda dōjō. Kano chose to continue his studies at another Tenjin Shin'yō-ryū school, that of Iso Masatomo (c. 1820–1881). Iso placed more emphasis on the practice of "kata", and entrusted randori instruction to assistants, increasingly to Kano. Iso died in June 1881 and Kano went on to study at the dōjō of Iikubo Tsunetoshi (1835–1889) of Kitō-ryū (起倒流). Like Fukuda, Iikubo placed much emphasis on randori, with Kitō-ryū having a greater focus on nage-waza (投げ技; throwing techniques).

=== Founding of the Kodokan ===
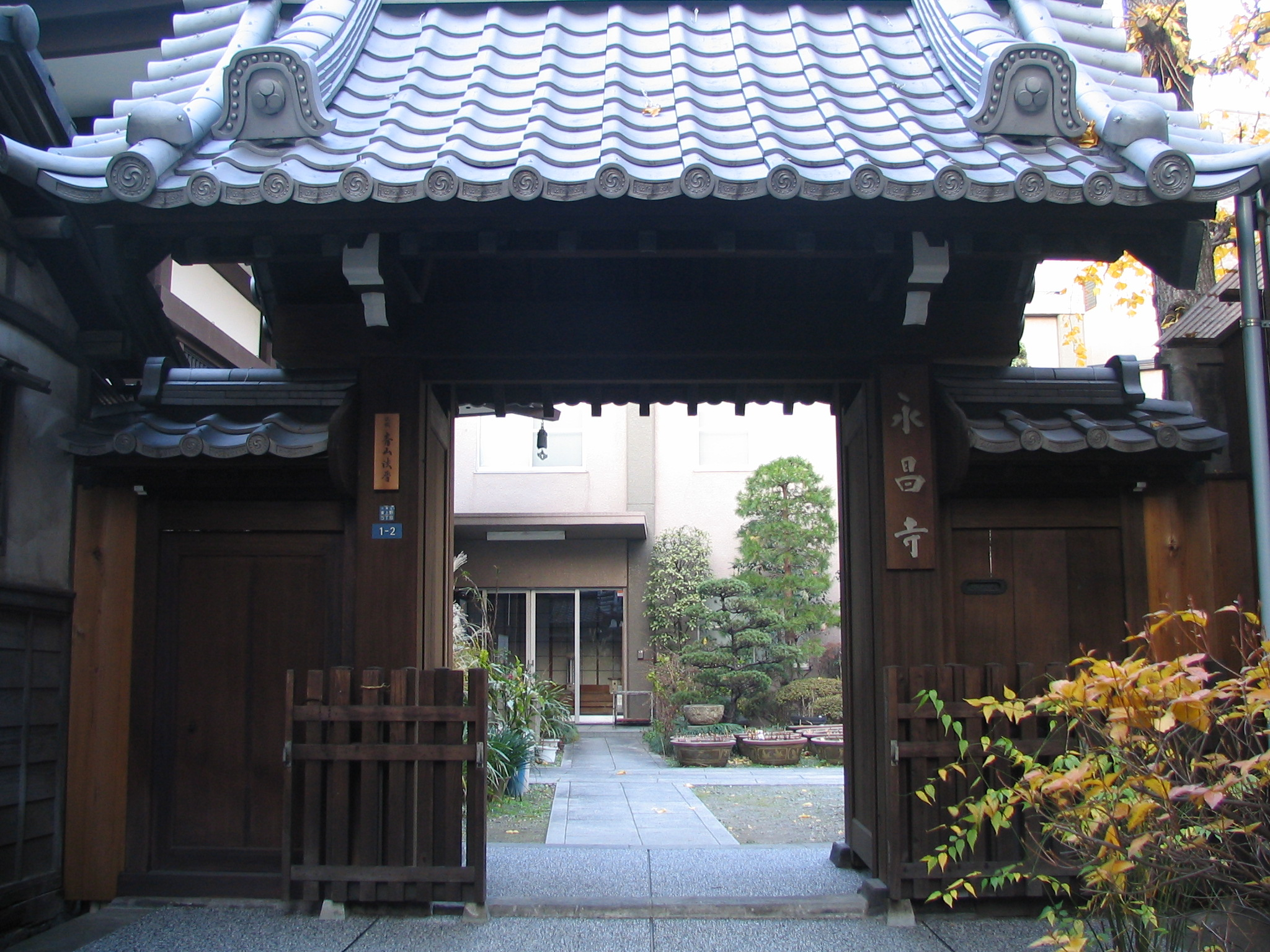
Eisho-ji temple, Tokyo

In February 1882, Kano founded a school and dōjō at the Eisho-ji (永昌寺), a Buddhist temple in what was then the Shitaya ward of Tokyo (now the Higashi Ueno district of Taitō ward). Iikubo, Kano's Kitō-ryū instructor, attended the dōjō three days a week to help teach and, although two years would pass before the temple would be called by the name Kōdōkan (講道館, Kodokan; "place for expounding the way"), and Kano had not yet received his Menkyo (免許; certificate of mastery) in Kitō-ryū, this is now regarded as the Kodokan founding.

The Eisho-ji dōjō was originally shoin. It was a relatively small affair, consisting of a 12 jo (214 sq ft) training area. Kano took in resident and non-resident students, the first two being Tomita Tsunejirō and Shiro Saigo. In August, the following year, the pair were granted shodan (初段; first rank) grades, the first that had been awarded in any martial art.

=== Judo versus jujutsu ===
Central to Kano's vision for judo were the principles of seiryoku zen'yō (精力善用; maximal efficiency, minimal effort) and jita kyōei (自他共栄; mutual welfare and benefit). He illustrated the application of seiryoku zen'yō with the concept of jū yoku gō o seisu (柔能く剛を制す - 柔能剛制; softness controls hardness):

jūdō (柔道, "Judo"), written in kanji

In short, resisting a more powerful opponent will result in your defeat, whilst adjusting to and evading your opponent's attack will cause him to lose his balance, his power will be reduced, and you will defeat him. This can apply whatever the relative values of power, thus making it possible for weaker opponents to beat significantly stronger ones. This is the theory of ju yoku go o seisu.

Kano realised that seiryoku zen'yō, initially conceived as a jujutsu concept, had a wider philosophical application. Coupled with the Neo-Confucianist-influenced jita kyōei, the wider application shaped the development of judo from a bujutsu (武術, martial art) to a budō (武道, martial way). Kano rejected techniques that did not conform to these principles and emphasized the importance of efficiency in the execution of techniques. He was convinced that practice of jujutsu while conforming to these ideals was a route to self-improvement and the betterment of society in general. He was, however, acutely conscious of the Japanese public's negative perception of jujutsu:

At the time a few bujitsu (martial arts) experts still existed but bujitsu was almost abandoned by the nation at large. Even if I wanted to teach jujitsu most people had now stopped thinking about it. So I thought it better to teach under a different name principally because my objectives were much wider than jujitsu.

Kano believed that "jūjutsu" was insufficient to describe his art: although jutsu (術) means "art" or "means", it implies a method consisting of a collection of physical techniques. Accordingly, he changed the second character to dō (道), meaning "way", "road" or "path", which implies a more philosophical context than jutsu and shares its conceptual origin with Chinese tao, also its etymological cognate written using the same character. Thus Kano renamed it Jūdō (柔道, judo).

Kano also spoke in 1927 about the need of integrate striking into the judo ruleset, as striking had been a fundamental part of most jujutsu schools. However, this change was never implemented due to its difficulty.

== Judo waza (techniques) ==
There are three basic categories of waza (技; techniques) in judo: nage-waza (投げ技; throwing techniques), katame-waza (固技; grappling techniques) and atemi-waza (当て身技; striking techniques). Judo is mostly known for nage-waza and katame-waza, because striking techniques of any kind are restricted in the competitive judo.

Judo practitioners typically devote a portion of each practice session to ukemi (受け身; break-falls), in order that nage-waza can be practiced without significant risk of injury. Several distinct types of ukemi exist, including ushiro ukemi (後ろ受身; rear breakfalls); yoko ukemi (横受け身; side breakfalls); mae ukemi (前受け身; front breakfalls); and zenpo kaiten ukemi (前方回転受身; rolling breakfalls)

The person who performs a waza is known as tori (取り; literally "taker") and the person to whom it is performed is known as uke (受け; "receiver").

=== Nage-waza (throwing techniques) ===
Nage-waza include all techniques in which tori attempts to throw or trip uke, usually with the aim of placing uke on their back. Each technique has three distinct stages:

- Kuzushi (崩し): the opponent becoming off balanced;
- Tsukuri (作り): turning in and fitting into the throw;
- Kake (掛け): execution and completion of the throw.

Nage-waza are typically drilled by the use of uchi-komi (内込), repeated turning-in, taking the throw up to the point of kake.

Traditionally, nage-waza are further categorised into tachi-waza (立ち技; standing techniques), throws that are performed with tori maintaining an upright position, and sutemi-waza (捨身技; sacrifice techniques), throws in which tori sacrifices his upright position in order to throw uke.

Tachi-waza are further subdivided into te-waza (手技; hand techniques), in which tori predominantly uses their arms to throw uke; koshi-waza (腰技; hip techniques) throws that predominantly use a lifting motion from the hips; and ashi-waza (足技; foot and leg techniques), throws in which tori predominantly utilises their legs.

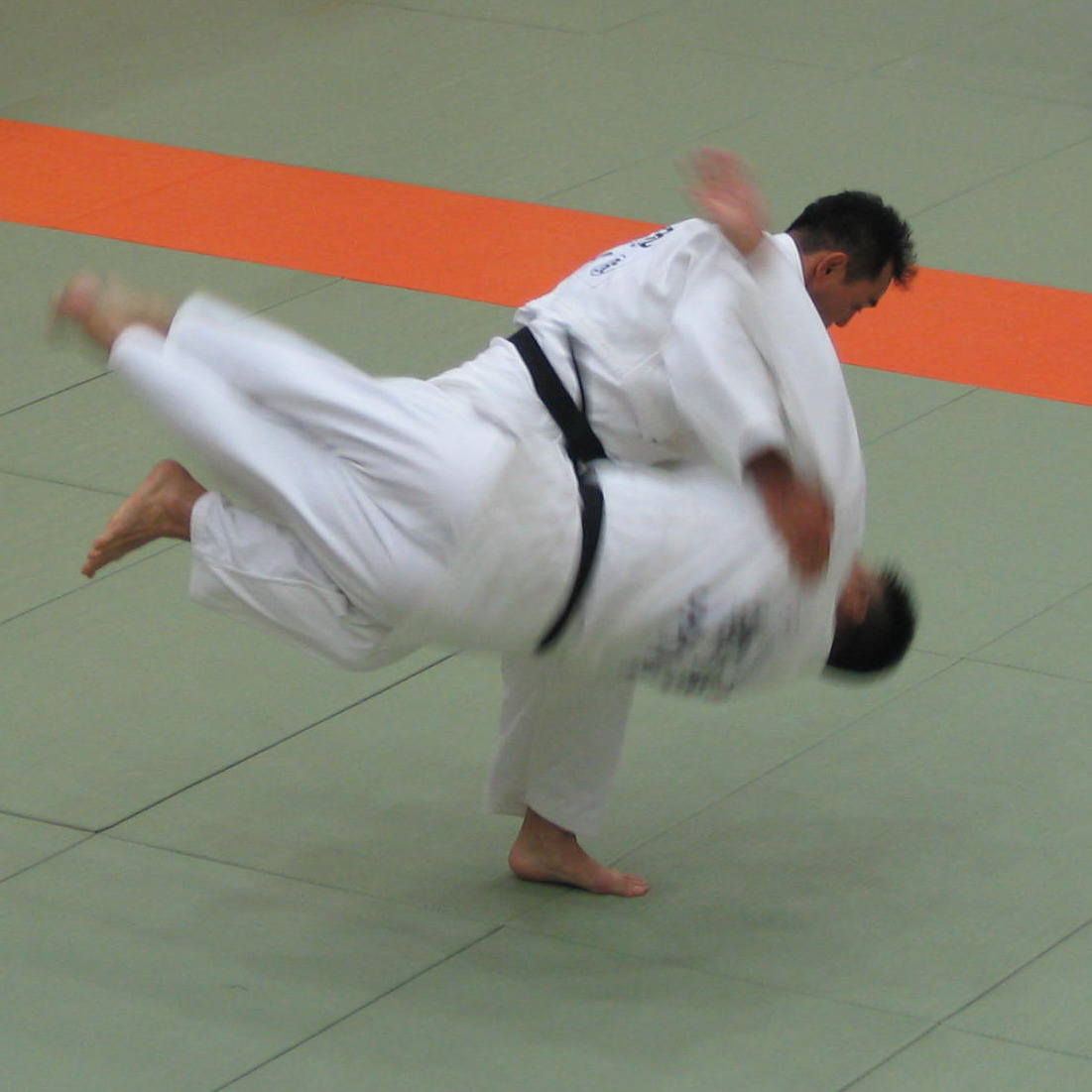
Harai goshi (払腰; sweeping hip), a koshi-waza

| Nage-waza (投げ技) throwing techniques | Tachi-waza (立ち技) standing techniques | Te-waza (手技) hand techniques |
| Nage-waza (投げ技) throwing techniques | Tachi-waza (立ち技) standing techniques | Koshi-waza (腰技) hip techniques |
| Nage-waza (投げ技) throwing techniques | Tachi-waza (立ち技) standing techniques | Ashi-waza (足技) foot and leg techniques |
| Nage-waza (投げ技) throwing techniques | Sutemi-waza (捨身技) sacrifice techniques | Ma-sutemi-waza (真捨身技) rear sacrifice techniques |
| Nage-waza (投げ技) throwing techniques | Sutemi-waza (捨身技) sacrifice techniques | Yoko-sutemi-waza (橫捨身技) side sacrifice techniques |

=== Katame-waza (grappling techniques) ===
Katame-waza is further categorised into osaekomi-waza (抑込技; holding techniques), in which tori traps and pins uke on their back on the floor; shime-waza (絞技; strangulation techniques), in which tori attempts to force a submission by choking or strangling uke; and kansetsu-waza (関節技; joint techniques), in which tori attempts to submit uke by painful manipulation of their joints.

A related concept is that of ne-waza (寝技; prone techniques), in which waza are applied from a non-standing position.

In competitive judo, Kansetsu-waza is currently limited to elbow joint manipulation. Manipulation and locking of other joints can be found in various kata, such as Katame-no-kata and Kodokan goshin jutsu.

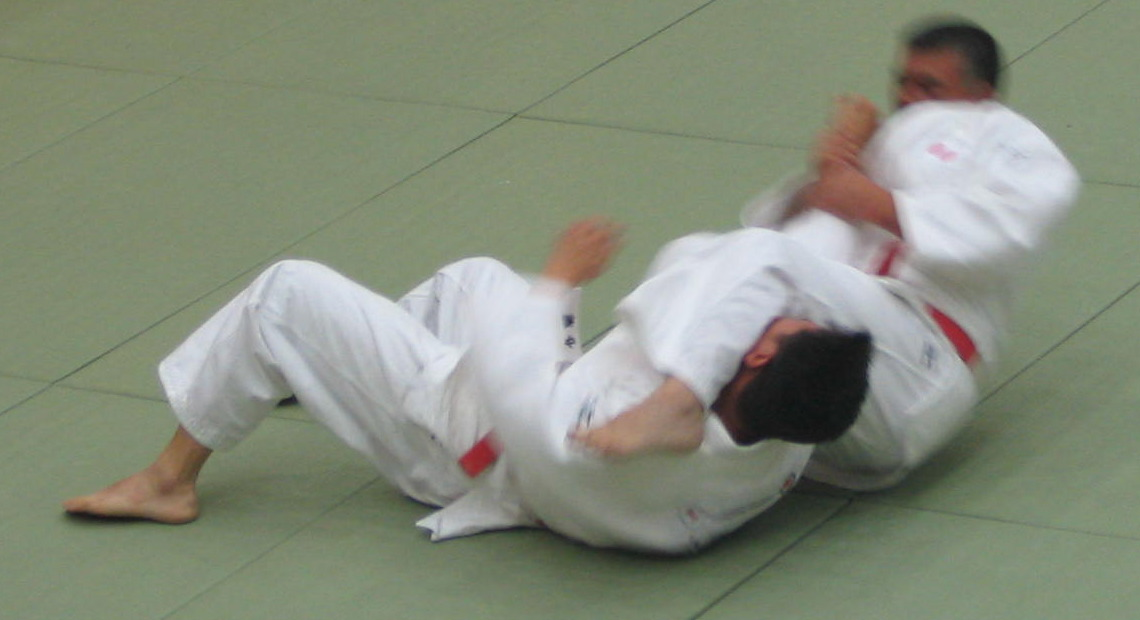
Juji gatame (十字固; cross lock)(armbar), a kansetsu-waza

| Katame-waza (固技) grappling techniques | Osaekomi-waza (抑込技) holding or pinning techniques |
| Katame-waza (固技) grappling techniques | Shime-waza (絞技) strangulation techniques |
| Katame-waza (固技) grappling techniques | Kansetsu-waza (関節技); Joint techniques (locks) |

=== Atemi-waza (striking techniques) ===
Atemi-waza are techniques in which tori disables uke with a strike to a vital point. Atemi-waza are not permitted outside of kata.

== Pedagogy ==
Children practicing judo in Tokyo

=== Randori (free practice) ===
Judo pedagogy emphasizes randori (乱取り; literally "taking chaos", but meaning "free practice"). This term covers a variety of forms of practice, and the intensity at which it is carried out varies depending on intent and the level of expertise of the participants. At one extreme, is a compliant style of randori, known as Yakusoku geiko (約束稽古; prearranged practice), in which neither participant offers resistance to their partner's attempts to throw. A related concept is that of Sute geiko (捨稽古; throw-away practice), in which an experienced judoka allows himself to be thrown by his less-experienced partner. At the opposite extreme from yakusoku geiko is the hard style of randori that seeks to emulate the style of judo seen in competition. While hard randori is the cornerstone of judo, over-emphasis of the competitive aspect is seen as undesirable by traditionalists if the intent of the randori is to "win" rather than to learn.

=== Kata (forms) ===
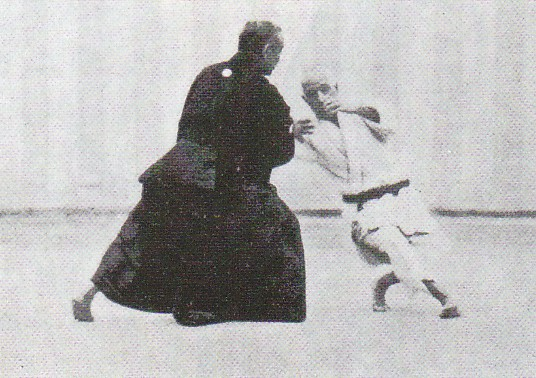
Jigoro Kano and Yamashita Yoshitsugu performing Koshiki-no-kata

Kata (形, kata; forms) are pre-arranged patterns of techniques and in judo, with the exception of elements of the Seiryoku-Zen'yō Kokumin-Taiiku, they are all practised with a partner. Their purposes include illustrating the basic principles of judo, demonstrating the correct execution of a technique, teaching the philosophical tenets upon which judo is based, allowing for the practice of techniques that are not allowed in randori, and to preserve ancient techniques that are historically important but are no longer used in contemporary judo.

There are ten kata that are recognized by the Kodokan today:

- Randori-no-kata (乱取りの形; Free practice forms), comprising two kata:
  - Nage-no-kata (投の形; Forms of throwing) Fifteen throws, practiced both left- and right-handed, three each from the five categories of nage waza: te waza, koshi waza, ashi waza, ma sutemi waza and yoko sutemi waza.
  - Katame-no-kata (固の形; Forms of grappling or holding). Fifteen techniques in three sets of five, illustrating the three categories of katame waza: osaekomi waza, shime waza and kansetsu waza.
- Kime-no-kata (極の形; Forms of decisiveness). Twenty techniques, illustrating the principles of defence in a combat situation, performed from kneeling and standing positions. Attacks are made unarmed and armed with a dagger and a sword. This kata utilises atemi waza, striking techniques, that are forbidden in randori.
- Kōdōkan goshinjutsu (講道館護身術; Kodokan skills of self-defence). The most recent recognised kata, comprising twenty-one techniques of defence against attack from an unarmed assailant and one armed with a knife, stick and pistol. This kata incorporates various jujutsu techniques such as wrist locks and atemi waza.
- Jū-no-kata (柔の形; Forms of gentleness & flexibility). Fifteen techniques, arranged in three sets of five, demonstrating the principle of Jū and its correct use in offence and defence.
- Gō-no-kata (剛の形; Forms of force). One of the oldest kata, comprising ten forms that illustrate the efficient use of force and resistance. Now rarely practiced.
- Itsutsu-no-kata (五の形; The five forms). An advanced kata, illustrating the principle of seiryoku zen'yō and the movements of the universe. The kata predates the creation of Kodokan and originated in Tenjin Shinyō-ryū.
- Koshiki-no-kata (古式の形; Traditional forms). Derived from Kitō-ryū Jujutsu, this kata was originally intended to be performed wearing armour. Kano chose to preserve it as it embodied the principles of judo.
- Seiryoku Zen'yō Kokumin Taiiku (精力善用国家体育; Maximum-efficiency national physical education). A series of exercises designed to develop the physique for judo.
- Joshi-goshinhō (女子護身法; Methods of self-defence for women). An exercise completed in 1943, and of which the development was ordered by Jirō Nangō, the second Kodokan president.

In addition, there are a number of commonly practiced kata that are not recognised by the Kodokan. Some of the more common kata include:

- Go-no-sen-no-kata (後の先の形) A "kata" of pre-emptive counter techniques that some claim has a heritage from Waseda University in Tokyo. The form is little more than standard counters, bookended by some protocol. Moreover, there is no universal standard nor accepted reference text. The exercise is unknown of in Japan, and was popularised in the West by Mikinosuke Kawaishi.
- Nage-waza-ura-no-kata (投げ技裏の形) A much more elegant and coherent kata of counter techniques, created by Kyuzo Mifune.
- Katame-waza ura-no-kata (固め技裏の形; Forms of reversing controlling techniques) a kata of counter-attacks to controlling techniques, attributed to Kazuo Itō

=== Tandoku-renshu (practice by oneself) ===
- Personal work.

== Competitive judo ==
=== History ===
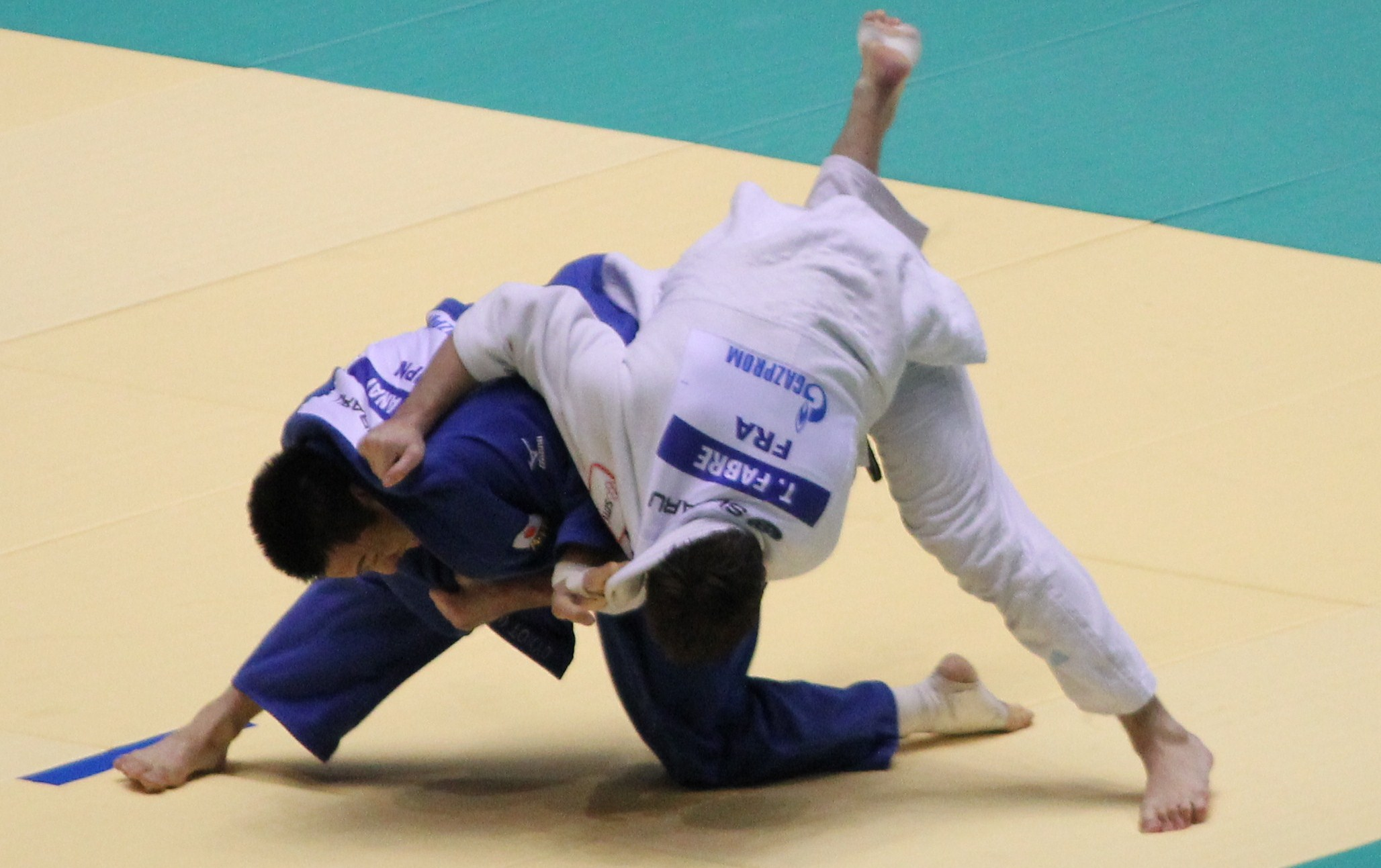
Japanese judoka Takamasa Anai Vs French judoka Thierry Fabre during the 2010 World Judo Championships held in Tokyo

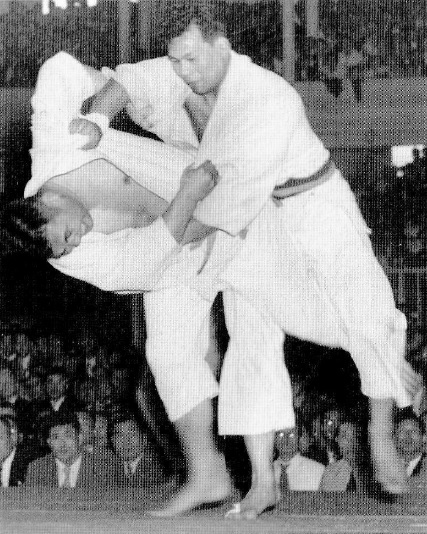
Yoshihiko Yoshimatsu attempting to throw Toshiro Daigo with an uchi mata in the final of the 1951 All-Japan Judo Championships

Contest (試合, shiai) is a vitally important aspect of judo. In 1899, Kano was asked to chair a committee of the Dai Nippon Butoku Kai to draw up the first formal set of contest rules for jujutsu. These rules were intended to cover contests between different various traditional schools of jujutsu as well as practitioners of Kodokan judo. Contests were 15 minutes long and were judged on the basis of nage waza and katame waza, excluding atemi waza. Wins were by two ippons, awarded in every four-main different path of winning alternatives, by "Throwing", where the opponent's back strikes flat onto the mat with sufficient force, by "Pinning" them on their back for a "sufficient" amount of time, or by "Submission", which could be achieved via Shime-waza or Kansetsu-waza, in which the opponent was forced to give himself or herself up or summon a referee's or corner-judge's stoppage. Finger, toe and ankle locks were prohibited. In 1900, these rules were adopted by the Kodokan with amendments made to prohibit all joint locks for kyu grades and added wrist locks to the prohibited kansetsu-waza for dan grades. It was also stated that the ratio of tachi-waza to ne-waza should be between 70% and 80% for kyu grades and between 60% and 70% for dan grades.

In 1916, additional rulings were brought in to further limit kansetsu waza with the prohibition of ashi garami and neck locks, as well as do jime. These were further added to in 1925.

Jigoro Kano for a long time wished to see judo as an Olympic discipline. The first time judo was seen in the Olympic Games was in an informal demonstration hosted by Kano at the 1932 Games. However, Kano was ambivalent about judo's potential inclusion as an Olympic sport:

I have been asked by people of various sections as to the wisdom and possibility of judo being introduced with other games and sports at the Olympic Games. My view on the matter, at present, is rather passive. If it be the desire of other member countries, I have no objection. But I do not feel inclined to take any initiative. For one thing, judo in reality is not a mere sport or game. I regard it as a principle of life, art and science. In fact, it is a means for personal cultural attainment. Only one of the forms of judo training, so-called randori or free practice can be classed as a form of sport. Certainly, to some extent, the same may be said of boxing and fencing, but today they are practiced and conducted as sports. Then the Olympic Games are so strongly flavored with nationalism that it is possible to be influenced by it and to develop "Contest Judo", a retrograde form as ju-jitsu was before the Kodokan was founded. Judo should be free as art and science from any external influences, political, national, racial, and financial or any other organized interest. And all things connected with it should be directed to its ultimate object, the "Benefit of Humanity". Human sacrifice is a matter of ancient history.

=== Use of judo at the Summer Olympic Games ===
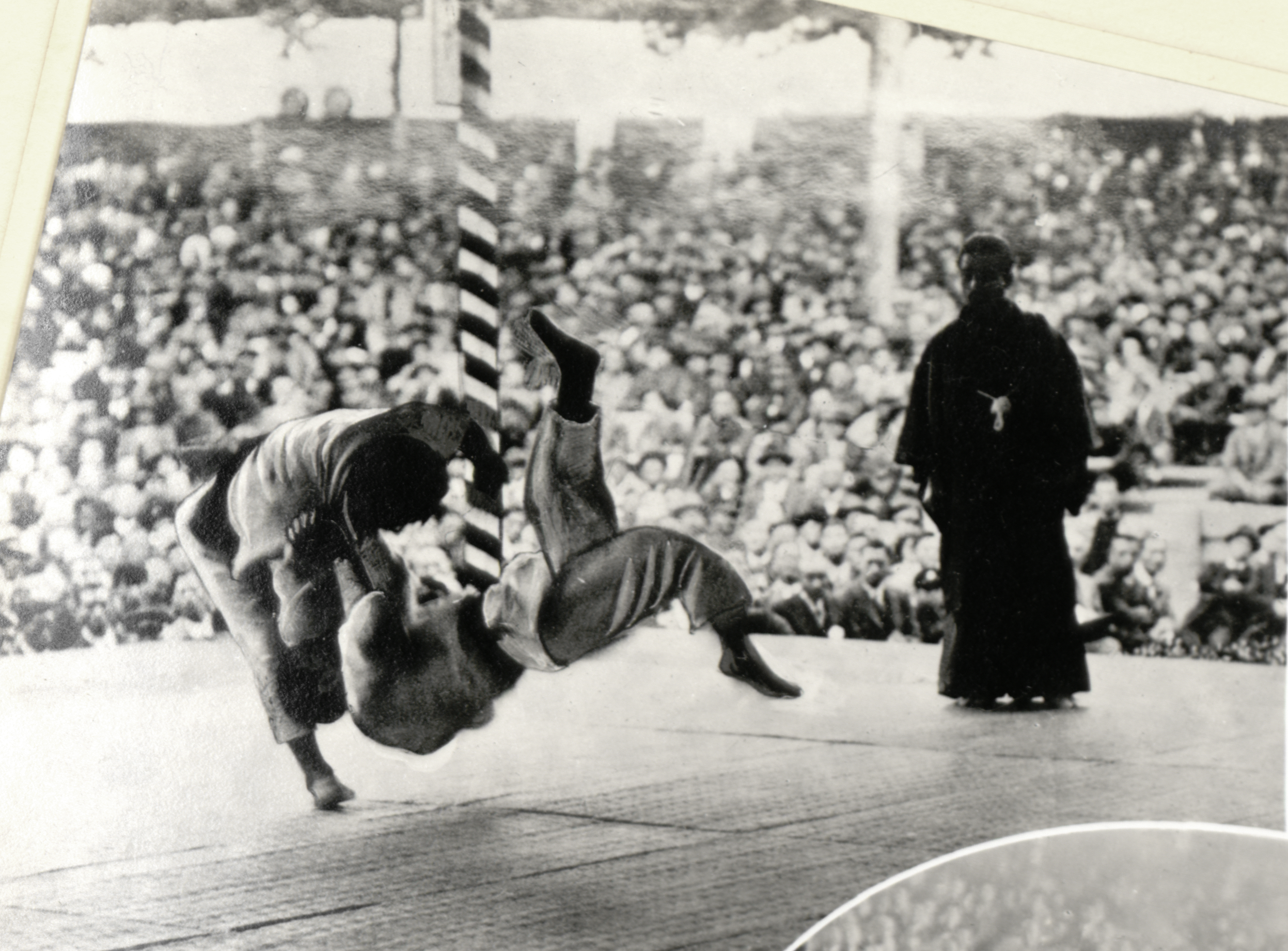
Judo (1935)

Olympic Judo pictogram

At the 57th general session of the International Olympic Committee, held in Rome on 22 August 1960, the IOC members formally decided to include judo among the events to be contested at the Olympic Games. The proposal, which was placed before the session by the Japanese delegation, was welcomed by all participants. The few who opposed had nothing against judo itself but against increasing the number of Olympic events as a whole. There were only two dissenting votes in the final poll. For the first time in history a traditional Japanese sport has been included in the Olympic competition.

Finally, judo was first contested as an Olympic sport for men in the 1964 Games in Tokyo. The Olympic Committee initially dropped judo for the 1968 Olympics, meeting protests. Dutchman Anton Geesink won the first Olympic gold medal in the open division of judo by defeating Akio Kaminaga of Japan. The women's event was introduced at the Olympics in 1988 as a demonstration event, and an official medal event in 1992.

In 2010, judo was introduced in the Youth Olympic Games starting with the 2010 Summer Youth Olympics in Singapore.

=== Use of judo at the Summer Paralympic Games ===
Judo was introduced as a Paralympic sport at the 1988 Summer Paralympics in Seoul, with women's events contested for the first time at 2004 Summer Paralympics.

=== Use of judo at the Commonwealth Games ===
Judo was an optional sport included in the three editions of the Commonwealth Games: 1990 Commonwealth Games in Auckland, 2002 Commonwealth Games in Manchester and 2014 Commonwealth Games in Glasgow. From 2022, judo will become a core sport in the 22nd edition of the Commonwealth Games, in Birmingham and also the 23rd edition of the Commonwealth Games in Glasgow.

In 2017, judo was introduced in the Commonwealth Youth Games starting with the 2017 Commonwealth Youth Games in Nassau.

=== Current international contest rules ===
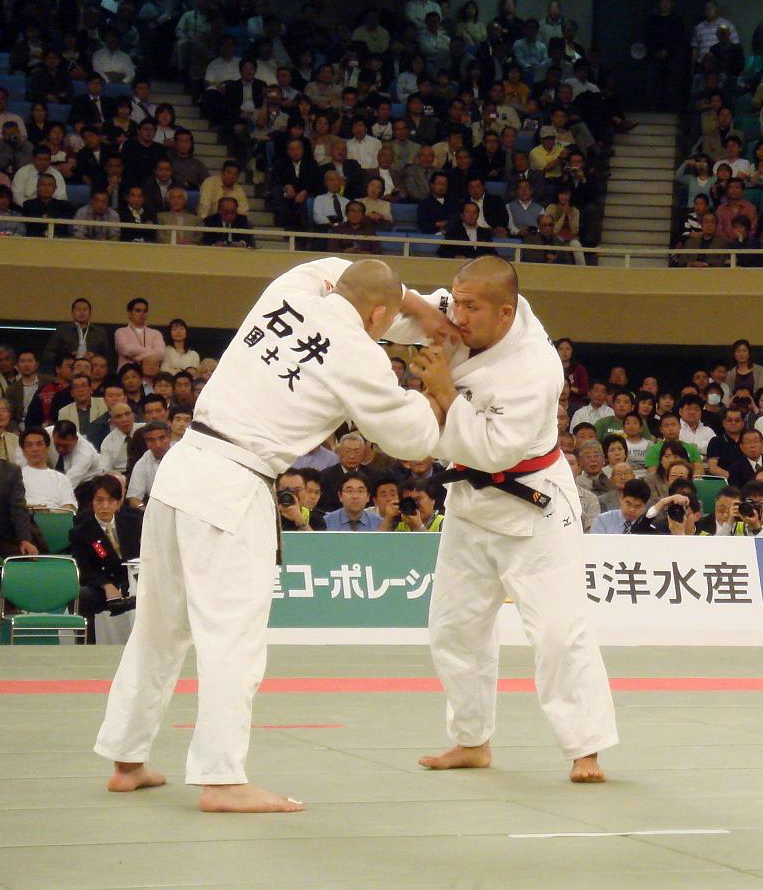
All-Japan Judo Championships, 2007 men's final

Penalties may be given for: passivity or preventing progress in the match; for safety infringements (for example by using prohibited techniques), or for behavior that is deemed to be against the spirit of judo. Fighting must be stopped if a participant is outside the designated area on the mat.

==== Weight divisions ====
There are currently seven weight divisions, subject to change by governing bodies, and may be modified based on the age of the competitors:

Weight divisions
| | Extra Lightweight | Half Lightweight | Lightweight | Half Middleweight | Middleweight | Half Heavyweight | Heavyweight |
|---|---|---|---|---|---|---|---|
| Men | Under 60 kg (130 lb; 9.4 st) | 60–66 kg (132–146 lb; 9.4–10.4 st) | 66–73 kg (146–161 lb; 10.4–11.5 st) | 73–81 kg (161–179 lb; 11.5–12.8 st) | 81–90 kg (179–198 lb; 12.8–14.2 st) | 90–100 kg (200–220 lb; 14–16 st) | Over 100 kg (220 lb; 16 st) |
| Women | Under 48 kg (106 lb; 7.6 st) | 48–52 kg (106–115 lb; 7.6–8.2 st) | 52–57 kg (115–126 lb; 8.2–9.0 st) | 57–63 kg (126–139 lb; 9.0–9.9 st) | 63–70 kg (139–154 lb; 9.9–11.0 st) | 70–78 kg (154–172 lb; 11.0–12.3 st) | Over 78 kg (172 lb; 12.3 st) |

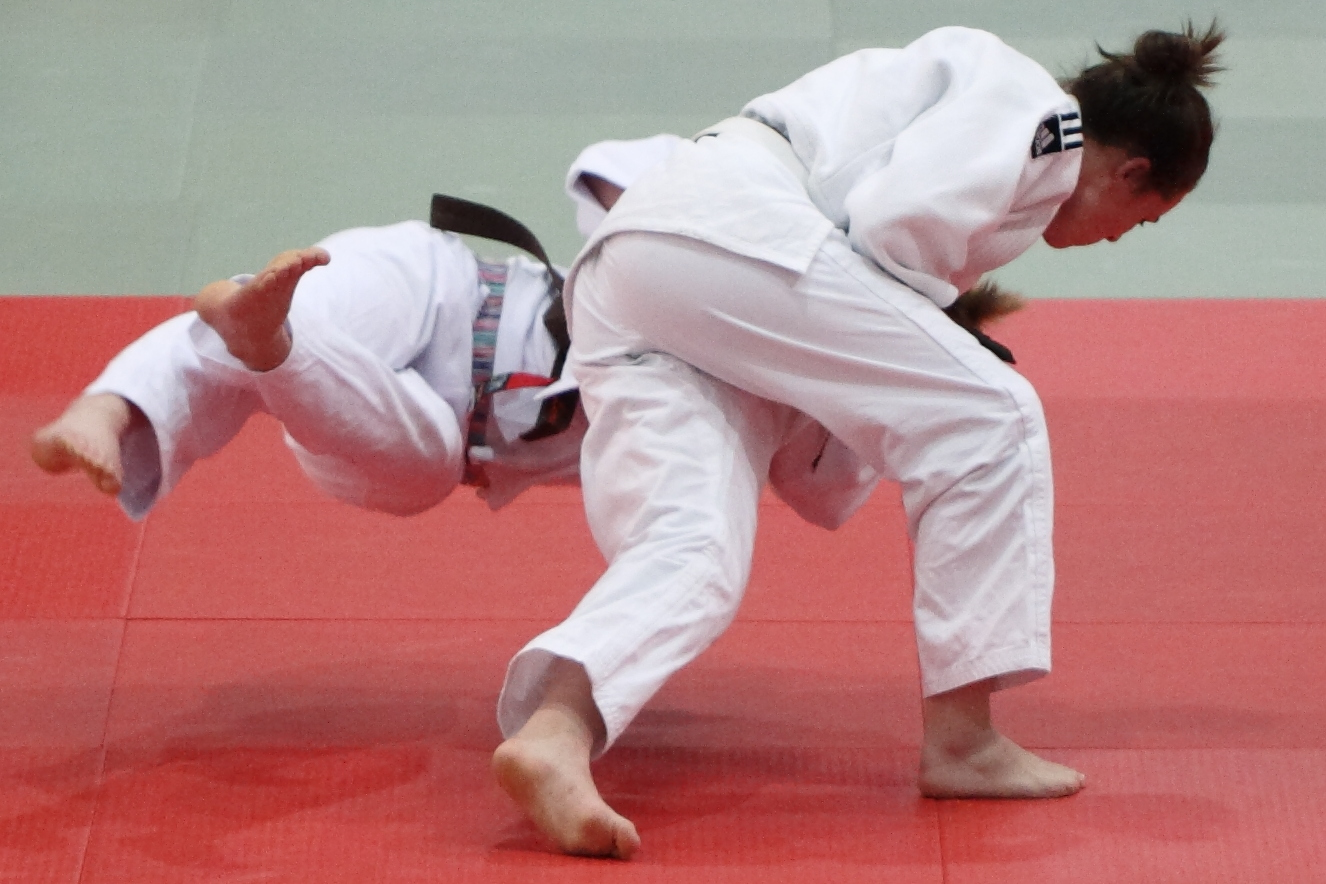
Throw during competition, leads to an ippon

==== Competition scoring ====
A throw that places the opponent on their back with impetus and control scores an ippon (一本), winning the contest. A lesser throw, where the opponent is thrown onto his back, but with insufficient force to merit an ippon, scores a waza-ari (技あり). Two scores of waza-ari equal an ippon waza-ari awasete ippon (技あり合わせて一本, ). This rule was cancelled in 2017, but it was resumed in 2018. Formerly, a throw that places the opponent onto his side scores a yuko (有効).

In 2017, the International Judo Federation announced changes in evaluation of points. There will only be ippon and waza-ari scores given during a match with yuko scores now included within waza-ari.

Ippon is scored in ne-waza for pinning an opponent on his back with a recognised osaekomi-waza for 20 seconds or by forcing a submission through shime-waza or kansetsu-waza. A submission is signalled by tapping the mat or the opponent at least twice with the hand or foot, or by saying maitta (まいった; I surrender). A pin lasting for less than 20 seconds, but more than 10 seconds scores waza-ari (formerly waza-ari was awarded for holds of longer than 15 seconds and yuko for holds of longer than 10 seconds).

Formerly, there was an additional score that was lesser to yuko, that of koka (効果). This has since been removed.

If the scores are identical at the end of the match, the contest is resolved by the Golden Score rule. Golden Score is a sudden death situation where the clock is reset to match-time, and the first contestant to achieve any score wins. If there is no score during this period, then the winner is decided by hantei (判定), the majority opinion of the referee and the two corner judges.

There have been changes to the scoring. In January 2013, the hantei was removed and the "Golden Score" no longer has a time limit. The match would continue until a judoka scored through a technique or if the opponent is penalised (hansoku-make).

==== Penalties ====
Two types of penalties may be awarded. A shido (指導 – literally "guidance") is awarded for minor rule infringements. A shido can also be awarded for a prolonged period of non-aggression. Recent rule changes allow for the first shidos to result in only warnings. If there is a tie, then and only then, will the number of shidos (if less than three) be used to determine the winner. After three shidos are given, the victory is given to the opponent, constituting an indirect hansoku-make (反則負け – literally "foul-play defeat"), but does not result in expulsion from the tournament. Note: Prior to 2017, the 4th shido was hansoku-make. If hansoku-make is awarded for a major rule infringement, it results not just in loss of the match, but in the expulsion from the tournament of the penalized player.

== In mixed martial arts ==
A number of judo practitioners have made an impact in mixed martial arts. Notable judo-trained MMA fighters include Olympic medalists Hidehiko Yoshida (Gold, 1992), Naoya Ogawa (Silver, 1992), Paweł Nastula (Gold, 1996), Makoto Takimoto (Gold, 2000), Satoshi Ishii (Gold, 2008), Ronda Rousey (Bronze, 2008), and Kayla Harrison (Gold, 2012 and 2016), former Russian national judo championship bronze medalist Fedor Emelianenko, Yoshihiro Akiyama, Don Frye, Rick Hawn, Daniel Kelly, Hector Lombard, Karo Parisyan, Ayaka Hamasaki, Antônio Silva, Oleg Taktarov, Rhadi Ferguson, Dong-Sik Yoon, Islam Makhachev and Khabib Nurmagomedov.

== Alternative styles and derivative martial arts ==
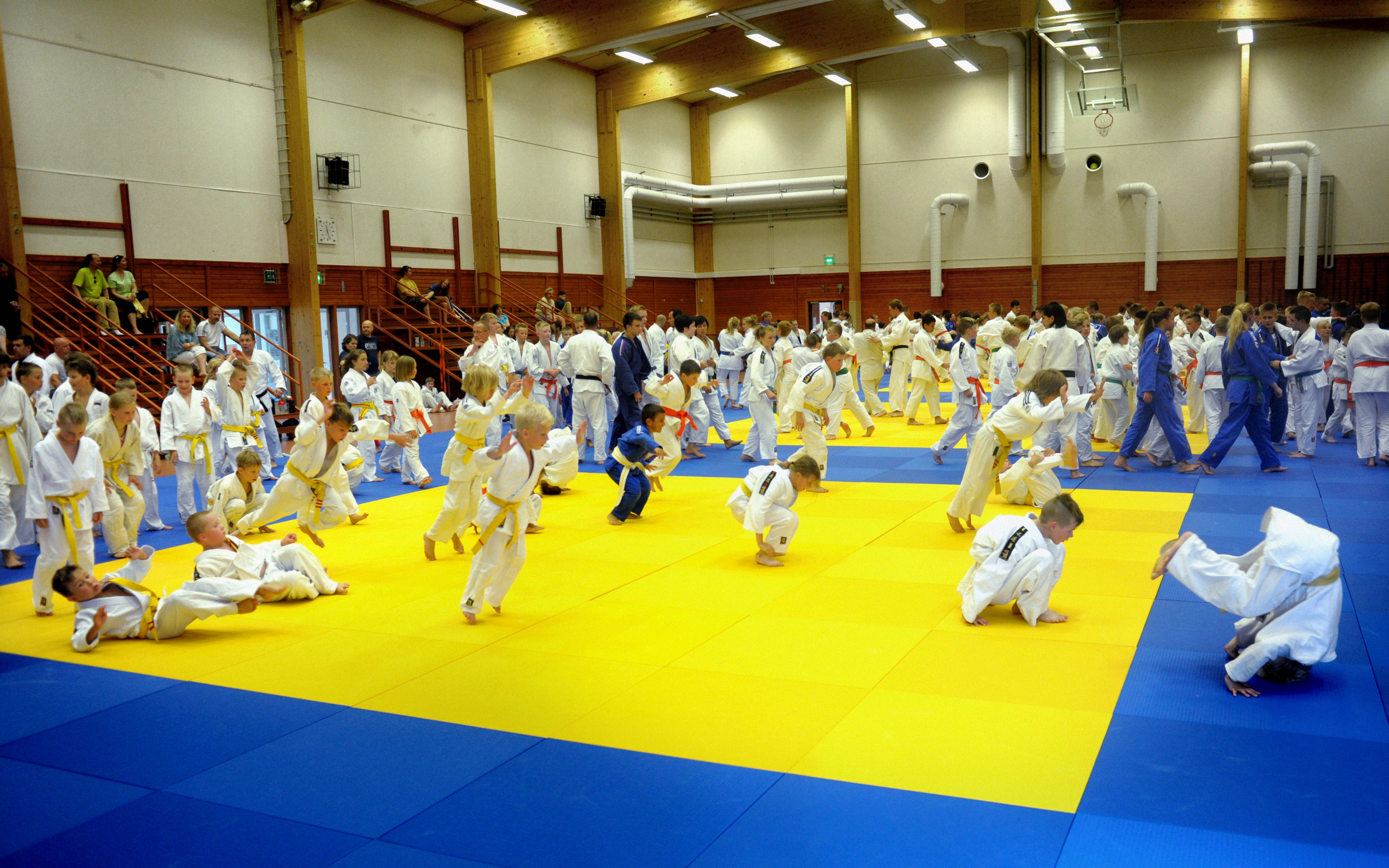
International judo camp in Artjärvi, Orimattila, Finland

Kano Jigoro's Kodokan judo is the most popular and well-known style of judo, but is not the only one. The terms judo and jujutsu were quite interchangeable in the early years, so some of these forms of judo are still known as jujutsu or jiu-jitsu either for that reason, or simply to differentiate them from mainstream judo. From Kano's original style of judo, several related forms have evolved—some now widely considered to be distinct arts.

=== Kosen judo ===
Commonly described as a separate style of Judo, Kosen judo is a competition rules set of Kodokan judo that was popularized in the early 20th century for use in Japanese Special High Schools Championships held at Kyoto Imperial University. The word "Kosen" is an acronym of Koto Senmon Gakko (高等専門学校; literally "Higher Professional School"). Currently, competitions are organized between Japan's seven former Imperial Universities and referred to as Nanatei Judo (ja:七帝柔道, literally "Seven Emperors Judo"). Kosen judo's focus on newaza has drawn comparisons with Brazilian jiu-jitsu.

=== Freestyle Judo ===
Freestyle Judo is a form of competitive judo practiced primarily in the United States that retains techniques that have been removed from mainstream IJF rules. Freestyle Judo is currently backed by the International Freestyle Judo Alliance (IFJA). The Amateur Athletic Union (AAU) officially sanctions Freestyle Judo in the United States of America.

=== Georgian Judo ===
Georgian Judo is influenced by Chidaoba (Georgian cultural jacket wrestling). Chidaoba's major influence on the Georgian style of judo is in its unorthodox grips as well as its throws and takedowns. Georgian Judo is also known for its countering techniques through the use of power moves such as bear hugs and double underhooks into throws and takedowns. It is represented by various olympic winners and World Champions, such as Lasha Bekauri, Lukhumi Chkhvimiani, Shota Chochishvili, Tato Grigalashvili, Zaza Kedelashvili, David Khakhaleishvili, Luka Maisuradze, Lasha Shavdatuashvili and others.

=== Russian Judo ===
This distinctive style of judo was influenced by the Soviet martial art of Sambo. It is represented by well-known coaches such as Alexander Retuinskih and Igor Yakimov, and mixed martial arts fighters such as Fedor Emelianenko, Oleg Taktarov, Khabib Nurmagomedov, and Karo Parisyan. In turn, Russian judo has influenced mainstream judo, with techniques such as the flying armbar being accepted into Kodokan judo.

=== Mongolian Judo ===
Unlike other Far East styles of Judo, Mongolian Judo focuses much more on power rather than technique. The influence of Bokh on Mongolian Judo can be seen in its grips and body positioning. Judo grips such as the over under, double underhooks and the heavy use of grips on the belt. It is represented by various world champions, such as Khaliuny Boldbaatar, Tsendiin Damdin, Boldyn Gankhaich, Naidangiin Tüvshinbayar, Mönkhbatyn Urantsetseg, Ganbatyn Boldbaatar.

=== Korean Judo ===
Korean Judo is also very technical but what really separates it from other styles is the speed at which its techniques are performed. Korean Judo it is not powerful in terms of using strength but instead, the practitioners use speed, movement and technique in order to create fast and powerful snaps. This styles produced various olympic champions, like Ahn Byeong-keun, Cho Min-sun, Choi Min-ho, Ha Hyung-joo, Jeon Ki-young, Kim Jae-bum, Kim Jae-yup, Lee Kyung-keun, Lee Won-hee, Song Dae-nam and others.

=== French Judo ===
French Judo is based on tactical Kumi Kata and focuses on breaking the posture of the opponent as well as preventing opponents from attaining a proper grip. This style does not use a huge amount of power; it prefers to use technique, tactics and timing. Many French judo practitioners have become World and Olympic champions, like Clarisse Agbegnenou, Émilie Andéol, Marc Alexandre, Djamel Bouras, Amandine Buchard, Guillaume Chaine, Axel Clerget, Sarah-Léonie Cysique, Lucie Décosse, Romane Dicko, David Douillet, Catherine Fleury-Vachon, Alexandre Iddir and many others.

=== Cuban Judo ===
Cuban Judo is characterized by an explosive and high athletic style that puts an emphasis on body conditioning and calculated planning mixed with raw power. In terms of training the athletes use a particularly methodical and intellectual approach to the sport.

=== Azerbaijani Judo ===
Judo in Azerbaijan has developed over the years and has become deep rooted and considered a top sport in the country. It's very similar to Georgian Judo, as its mostly focused on the practitioner's strength during throws. It's a hybrid of the original Kodokan Judo and the traditional Azerbaijan style of wrestling called Azeri, whose techniques consist of unorthodox grips and positioning during counter-attacks.

=== Israeli Judo ===
Judo has become a top sport in Israel only recently. Israeli judo is characterized by a particular emphasis on hip throws, which are executed with a mix of technique and speed, with the practitioner having to adjust his sleeves before powerfully gripping and throwing the opponent away. Israeli judo took its first baby steps to prominence in 1986, when Moshe Ponte won a silver medal at the Belgian Open. Six years later, Yael Arad became the first Israeli Olympic medallist by winning a silver in Barcelona while Oren Smadja brought home a bronze. Arad also won a world silver and a European gold the following year. By 1995, when Smadja picked up a world silver, judo had become a national craze. Gil Ofer won the British Open in 1998 and two world cup titles two years later.

=== Sambo ===
Sambo is influenced by judo combined with wrestling techniques, and striking in case of combat sambo. Vasili Oshchepkov was one of the first European judo black belts under Kano. Oshchepkov went on to contribute his knowledge of judo as one of the three founders of Sambo, which also integrated various international and Soviet bloc wrestling styles and other combative techniques. Oshchepkov was executed during the political purges of 1937 and judo was banned for decades until its inclusion in the 1964 Olympics, where sambists won 4 bronze medals. In their History of Sambo, Brett Jacques and Scott Anderson wrote that in Russia "judo and SOMBO were considered to be the same thing"—albeit with a different uniform and some differences in the rules.

=== Brazilian jiu-jitsu ===
An adoption of Kano jiu jitsu (a common name for judo at the time) in Brazil attributed to Mitsuyo Maeda's students, most notably the Gracie family. 10th Planet Jiu Jitsu and other wrestling-influenced systems without the gi have also become popular.

=== Other styles ===
Judo also influenced other combat styles such as close-quarters combat (CQC), mixed martial arts (MMA), shoot wrestling and submission wrestling.

== Safety ==
Kano's vision for judo was one of a martial way that could be practiced realistically. Randori (free practice) was a central part of judo pedagogy and shiai (competition) a crucial test of a judoka's understanding of judo. Safety necessitated some basic innovations that shaped judo's development. Atemi waza (striking techniques) were entirely limited to kata (prearranged forms) early in judo's history. Kansetsu waza (joint manipulation techniques) were limited to techniques that focused on the elbow joint. Various throwing techniques that were judged to be too dangerous to practice safely at full force, such as all joint-locking throws from Jujutsu, were also prohibited in shiai. To maximise safety in nage waza (throwing techniques), judoka trained in ukemi (break falls) and practiced on tatami (rice straw mats).

=== Kansetsu and shime waza ===
The application of joint manipulation and strangulation/choking techniques is generally safe under controlled conditions typical of judo dōjō and in competition. It is usual for there to be age restrictions on the practice and application of these types of techniques, but the exact nature of these restrictions will vary from country to country and from organization to organization.

=== Nage waza ===
Safety in the practice of throwing techniques depends on the skill level of both tori and uke. Inexpertly applied throws have the potential to injure both tori and uke, for instance when tori compensates for poor technique by powering through the throw. Similarly, poor ukemi can result in injury, particularly from more powerful throws that uke lacks the skill to breakfall from. For these reasons, throws are normally taught in order of difficulty for both tori and uke. This is exemplified in the Gokyo (五教; literally "five teachings"), a traditional grouping of throws arranged in order of difficulty of ukemi. Those grouped in Dai ikkyo (第一教; literally "first teaching") are relatively simple to breakfall from whereas those grouped in dai gokyo (第五教; literally "fifth teaching") are difficult to breakfall from.

== Mental training ==
Mental training is an emerging modality of training in judo that aims to improve the performance of high-performance athletes in training and competition and also to promote health and well-being in the daily life of athletes and their entourage through the learning and application of psychological skills. The first publication of a judo-specific practical mental training approach based on sports training principles was in 2005 with the work of Boris Blumenstein, Ronnie Lidor and Gershon Tenenbaum. In 2022, Caio Gabriel published the first article on mental training that appeared in the scientific journal of the International Judo Federation, "The Arts and Sciences of Judo".

== Judoka (practitioner) ==
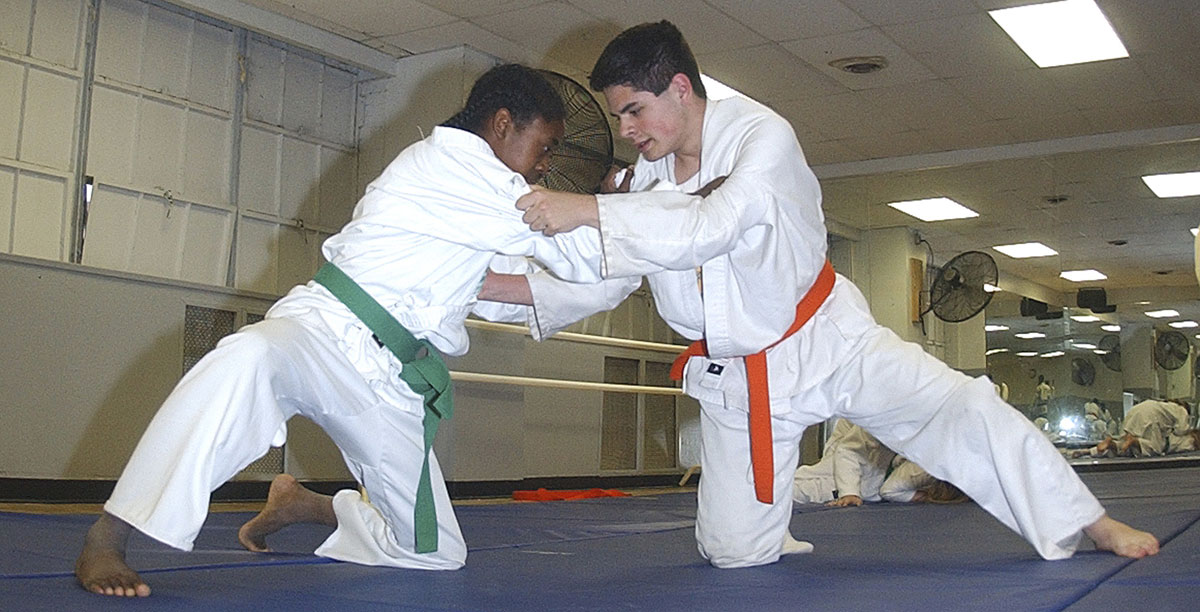
Two judoka wearing judogi

A practitioner of judo is known as a judoka (柔道家). The modern meaning of "judoka" in English is a judo practitioner of any level of expertise, but traditionally those below the rank of 4th dan were called kenkyu-sei (研究生; trainees); and only those of 4th dan or higher were called judoka. (The suffix -ka (家), when added to a noun, means a person with expertise or special knowledge on that subject).

A judo teacher is called sensei (先生). Traditionally, that title was reserved for instructors of 4th dan and above.

== Judogi (uniform) ==
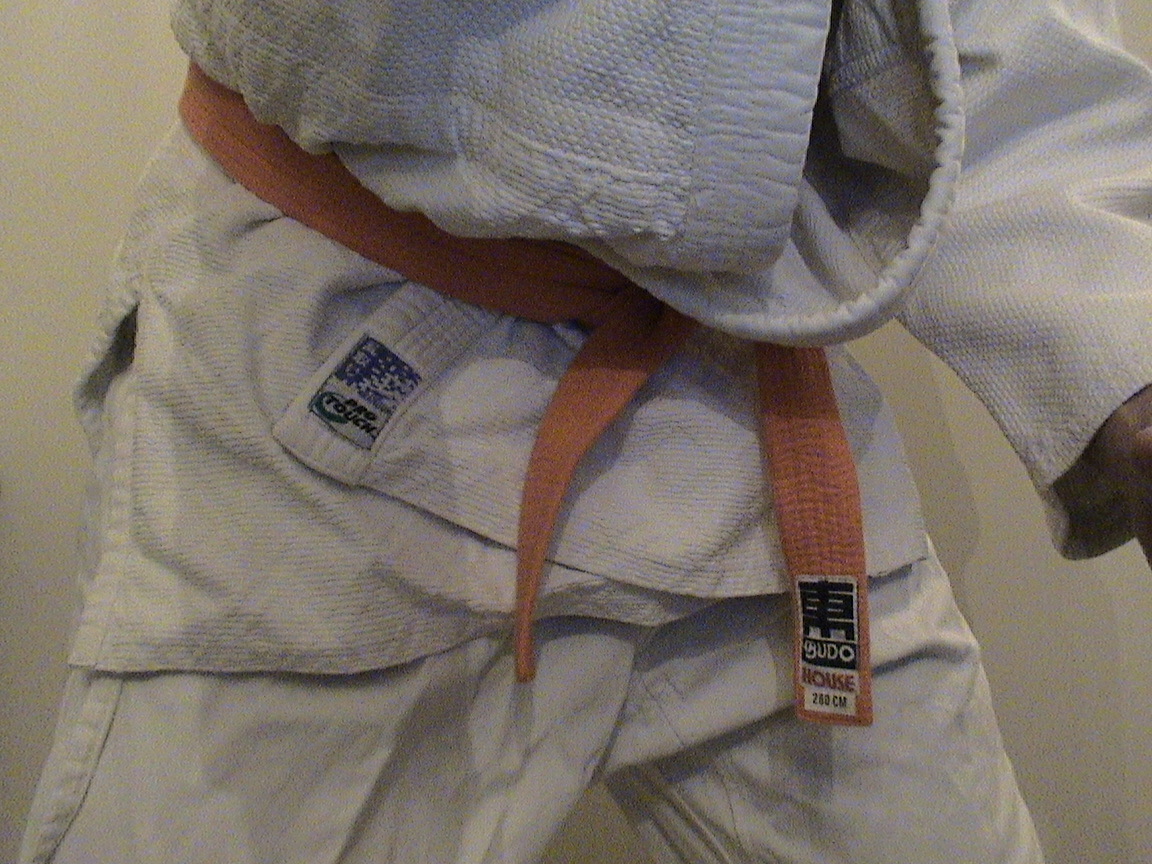
The judogi is made from a heavy weave to withstand the stress of throwing and grappling.

Judo practitioners traditionally wear white uniforms called keikogi (稽古着, keikogi; practice clothing) or jūdōgi (柔道着, judogi; judo clothing) sometimes abbreviated in the west as "gi". It comprises a heavy cotton kimono-like jacket called an uwagi (上衣; jacket), similar to traditional hanten (半纏; workers' jackets) fastened by an obi (帯, obi; belt), coloured to indicate rank, and cotton draw-string zubon (ズボン; trousers). Early examples of keikogi had short sleeves and trouser legs and the modern long-sleeved judogi was adopted in 1906.

The modern use of the blue judogi for high level competition was first suggested by Anton Geesink at the 1986 Maastricht IJF DC Meeting. For competition, a blue judogi is worn by one of the two competitors for ease of distinction by judges, referees, and spectators. In Japan, both judoka use a white judogi and the traditional red obi (based on the colors of the Japanese flag) is affixed to the belt of one competitor. Outside Japan, a colored obi may also be used for convenience in minor competitions, the blue judogi only being mandatory at the regional or higher levels, depending on organization. Japanese practitioners and traditionalists tend to look down on the use of blue because judo is considered a pure sport, and replacing the pure white judogi with the impure blue is an offense.

For events organized under the auspices of the International judo Federation (IJF), judogi have to bear the IJF Official Logo Mark Label. This label demonstrates that the judogi has passed a number of quality control tests to ensure it conforms to construction regulations ensuring it is not too stiff, flexible, rigid or slippery to allow the opponent to grip or to perform techniques.

== Organizations ==
The international governing body for judo is the International Judo Federation (IJF), founded in 1951. Members of the IJF include the African Judo Union (AJU), the Pan-American Judo Confederation (PJC), the Judo Union of Asia (JUA), the European Judo Union (EJU) and the Oceania Judo Union (OJU), each comprising a number of national judo associations. The IJF is responsible for organising international competition and hosts the World Judo Championships and is involved in running the Olympic Judo events.

== Rank and grading ==
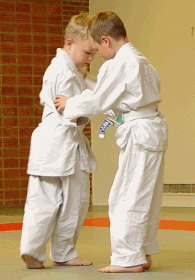
Two children training in judo techniques

Judo is a hierarchical art, where seniority of judoka is designated by what is known as the kyū (級, kyū) -dan (段, dan) ranking system. This system was developed by Jigoro Kano and was based on the ranking system in the board game Go.

Beginning students progress through kyu grades towards dan grades.

A judoka's position within the kyu-dan ranking system is displayed by the color of their belt. Beginning students typically wear a white belt, progressing through descending numerical order kyu ranks until they are deemed to have achieved a level of competence sufficient to be a dan grade, at which point they wear the kuro obi (黒帯; black belt). The kyu-dan ranking system has since been widely adopted by modern martial arts.

The highest black belt ranks have no formal requirements and are decided by the president of the Kodokan. Kano Jigoro's grandson Kano Yukimitsu served as the fourth president from 1980 until 2009. As an educator by profession, Kanō believed that there should be no end to an individual's learning, and therefore no limit to the number of dan ranks. As of 2011, fifteen Japanese men have been promoted to jūdan (十段; 10th dan) by the Kodokan; the IJF and Western and Asian national federations have promoted another eleven who are not recognized at that level of rank by the Kodokan. On 28 July 2011, the promotion board of USA Judo awarded Keiko Fukuda the rank of 10th dan, who was the first woman to be promoted to judo's highest level, albeit not a Kodokan-recognized rank.

Although dan ranks tend to be consistent between national organizations there is more variation in the kyū grades, with some countries having more kyū grades. Although initially kyū grade belt colours were uniformly white, today a variety of colours are used. The first black belts to denote a dan rank in the 1880s, initially the wide obi was used; as practitioners trained in kimono, only white and black obi were used. It was not until the early 1900s, after the introduction of the judogi, that an expanded colored belt system of awarding rank was created. Written accounts from the archives of London's Budokwai judo club, founded in 1918, record the use of coloured judo belts at the 1926 9th annual Budokwai Display, and a list of ranked colored judokas appears in the Budokwai Committee Minutes of June 1927. Kawaishi visited London and the Budokwai in 1928, and was probably inspired to bring the coloured belt system to France.

== World Judo Day ==
On October 28 of every year, the judo community celebrates the World Judo Day in the honor of the birth of Judo's founder, Jigoro Kano. The theme of the World Judo Day changes from year to year, but the goal is always to highlight the moral values of Judo. The first celebration was held in 2011. Past themes for the celebration have included:

- Peace (2025)
- Wellbeing (2024)
- Bring a Friend (2023)
- Inclusion (2022)
- Solidarity (2021)
- Stronger Together (2020)
- Plant a Tree (2019)
- Friendship (2018)
- Courage (2017)

== In popular culture ==
=== Films ===
- Akira Kurosawa, Sanshiro Sugata (姿三四郎, Sugata Sanshirō; a.k.a. Judo Saga), 1943.
- Akira Kurosawa, Sanshiro Sugata Part II (續姿三四郎, Zoku Sugata Sanshirō; a.k.a. Judo Saga II), 1945.
- Johnnie To, Throw Down (柔道龍虎榜, Yau doh lung fu bong), 2004.

=== Manga & Anime ===
- Naoki Urasawa award winning manga Yawara! (1986-1993) sold over 30 million copies. Featuring a fashion obsessed teenage girl named Yawara whom is exceptionally talented Judoka who longs to live a normal life, despite her grandfather, a master Judoka continuous push for Yawara to win the gold medal at Barcelona 1992 and the People's Honour Award. The manga was adapted into 124 episode anime by Madhouse Studio, airing from 1989 to 1992, and saw one live action movie and one animated movie released in its name. Ryoko Tani (谷 亮子, Tani Ryōko) a real-life Judoka who participated in the Olympics of Barcelona 1992 was famously nicknamed "Yawara-chan" for her skilled display of Judo at the summer Olympics.

== See also ==
- Judo by country
- List of celebrity judoka
- List of judo techniques, partial list of judo techniques
- List of judoka
- List of World Champions in Judo
- Jacket wrestling

== Bibliography ==
- Adams, Neil (1991), Armlocks, Judo Masterclass Techniques, London: Ippon Books
- Cachia, Jeffrey (2009), Effective Judo, Sarasota, FL: Elite Publishing
- Daigo, Toshiro (2005), Kodokan Judo Throwing Techniques, Tokyo, Japan: Kodansha International
- De Crée, Carl (2015), "Kōdōkan jūdō's three orphaned forms of counter techniques – Part 3: The Katame-waza ura-no-kata ―"Forms of reversing controlling techniques"", Archives of Budo, 11: 155–174
- De Crée, Carl (2012), The origin, inner essence, biomechanical fundamentals, and current teaching and performance anomalies of Kōdōkan jūdō's esoteric sixth kata: The Itsutsu-no-kata ―"Forms of five", Rome, Italy: University of Rome
- De Crée, Carl; Jones, Llyr C. (2009a), "Kōdōkan Jūdō's Elusive Tenth Kata: The Gō-no-kata - "Forms of Proper Use of Force" - Part 1", Archives of Budo, 5: 55–73
- De Crée, Carl; Jones, Llyr C. (2009b), "Kōdōkan Jūdō's Elusive Tenth Kata: The Gō-no-kata - "Forms of Proper Use of Force" - Part 2", Archives of Budo, 5: 74–82
- De Crée, Carl; Jones, Llyr C. (2009c), "Kōdōkan Jūdō's Elusive Tenth Kata: The Gō-no-kata - "Forms of Proper Use of Force" - Part 3", Archives of Budo, 5: 83–95
- De Crée, Carl; Jones, Llyr C. (2011a), "Kōdōkan Jūdō's Inauspicious Ninth Kata: The Joshi goshinhō - "Self-defense methods for females" - Part 1", Archives of Budo, 7: 105–123
- De Crée, Carl; Jones, Llyr C. (2011b), "Kōdōkan Jūdō's Inauspicious Ninth Kata: The Joshi goshinhō - "Self-defense methods for females" - Part 2", Archives of Budo, 7: 125–137
- De Crée, Carl; Jones, Llyr C. (2011c), "Kōdōkan Jūdō's Inauspicious Ninth Kata: The Joshi goshinhō - "Self-defense methods for females" - Part 3", Archives of Budo, 7: 137–139
- Fromm, Alan; Soames, Nicolas (1982), Judo - The Gentle Way, London: Routledge & Kegan Paul
- Fukuda, Keiko (2004), Ju-No-Kata, Berkeley, California: North Atlantic Books
- Harrison, E. J. (1952), Manual of Judo, London: Foulsham
- Hoare, Syd (2005), "Development of judo competition rules" (PDF), sydhoare.com, archived from the original (PDF) on July 1, 2019
- Hoare, Syd (2009), A History of Judo, London: Yamagi Books
- Inman, Roy (2005), The Judo Handbook, UK: Silverdale Books
- Inokuma, Isao; Sato, Noboyuki (1987), Best Judo, Tokyo, Japan: Kodansha International
- Ishikawa, Takahiko; Draeger, Donn F. (1999), Judo Training Methods, Boston, Massachusetts: Tuttle Publishing
- Itō, Kazuo (1970), Jūdō no nage- to katame-no-ura-waza, Tōkyō: Seibunkan Shoten
- Jones, Llyr C.; Hanon, Michael J. (2010), "The way of kata in Kodokan Judo", Journal of Asian Martial Arts, 19: 8–37
- Kano, Jigoro (1994), Kodokan Judo, Tokyo, Japan: Kodansha
- Kano, Jigoro (2005), Naoki, Murata (ed.), Mind Over Muscle: Writings from the founder of Judo, Tokyo, Japan: Kodansha
- Kano, Jigoro (2008), Watson, Brian N. (ed.), Judo Memoirs of Jigoro Kano, Victoria, BC: Trafford Publishing
- Kashiwazaki, Katsuhiko (1992), Shimewaza, Judo Masterclass Techniques, London: Ippon Books
- Kashiwazaki, Katsuhiko (1997), Osaekomi, Judo Masterclass Techniques, London: Ippon Books
- Koizumi, Gunji (April 1947), "1936 Conversation with Jigoro Kano", Budokwai Bulletin
- Law, Mark (2007), The Pyjama Game, A Journey Into Judo, London, UK: Aurum Press
- Lowry, Dave (2006), In the dojo. A guide to the rituals and etiquette of the Japanese martial arts, Boston, MA: Weatherhill
- Mifune, Kyuzo (2004), The Canon of Judo: Classic teachings on principles and techniques, Tokyo, Japan: Kodansha
- Ohlenkamp, Neil (2006), Judo Unleashed: Essential Throwing & Grappling Techniques for Intermediate to Advanced Martial Artists, Maidenhead: McGraw-Hill
- Otaki, Tadao; Draeger, Donn F. (1997), Judo Formal Techniques: Complete guide to Kodokan randori no kata (reprint ed.), Clarendon, Vermont: Tuttle Publishing
- Takahashi, Masao (2005), Mastering Judo, Champaign, Illinois: Human Kinetics
